= Kengkou station (Guangzhou Metro) =

Guangzhou Metro station

Kengkou 坑口
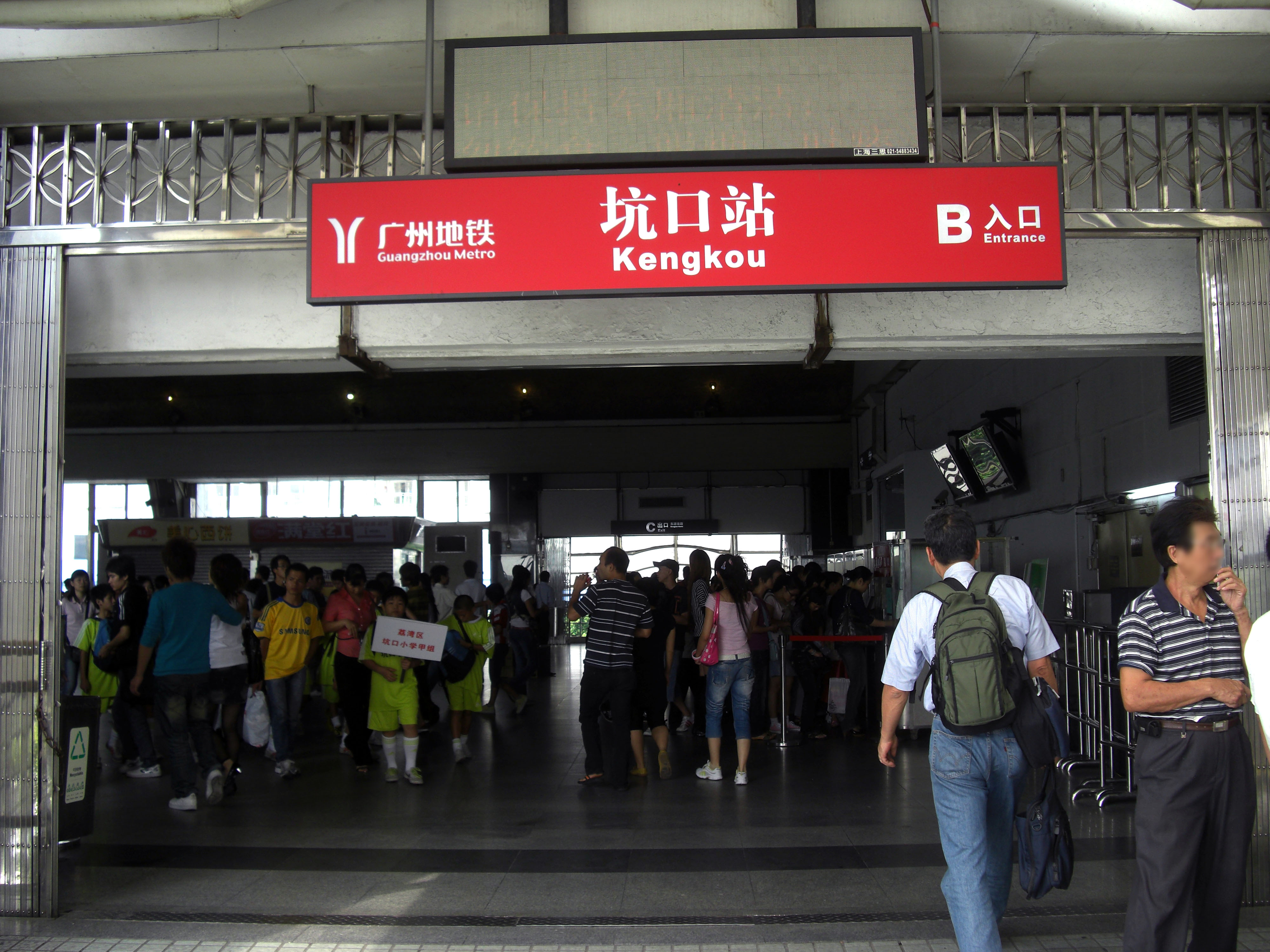

Chinese name
- Traditional Chinese: 坑口站
Transcriptions
Standard Mandarin
- Hanyu Pinyin: Kēngkǒu Zhàn
Yue: Cantonese
- Jyutping: haang^{1}hau^{2}zaam^{6}
- Hong Kong Romanization: Hang Hau station

General information
- Location: Huadi Avenue Middle (花地大道中) and Longxi Avenue (龙溪大道); Liwan District, Guangzhou, Guangdong; China
- Coordinates: 23.078878°N 113.232498°E
- Operated by: Guangzhou Metro Co. Ltd.
- Line: Line 1
- Platforms: 2 (1 island platform)

Construction
- Structure type: At-grade

Other information
- Station code: 102

History
- Opened: June 28, 1997; 28 years ago

Services
Preceding station	Guangzhou Metro	Following station
Xilang Terminus	Line 1	Huadiwan towards Guangzhou East Railway Station
Location

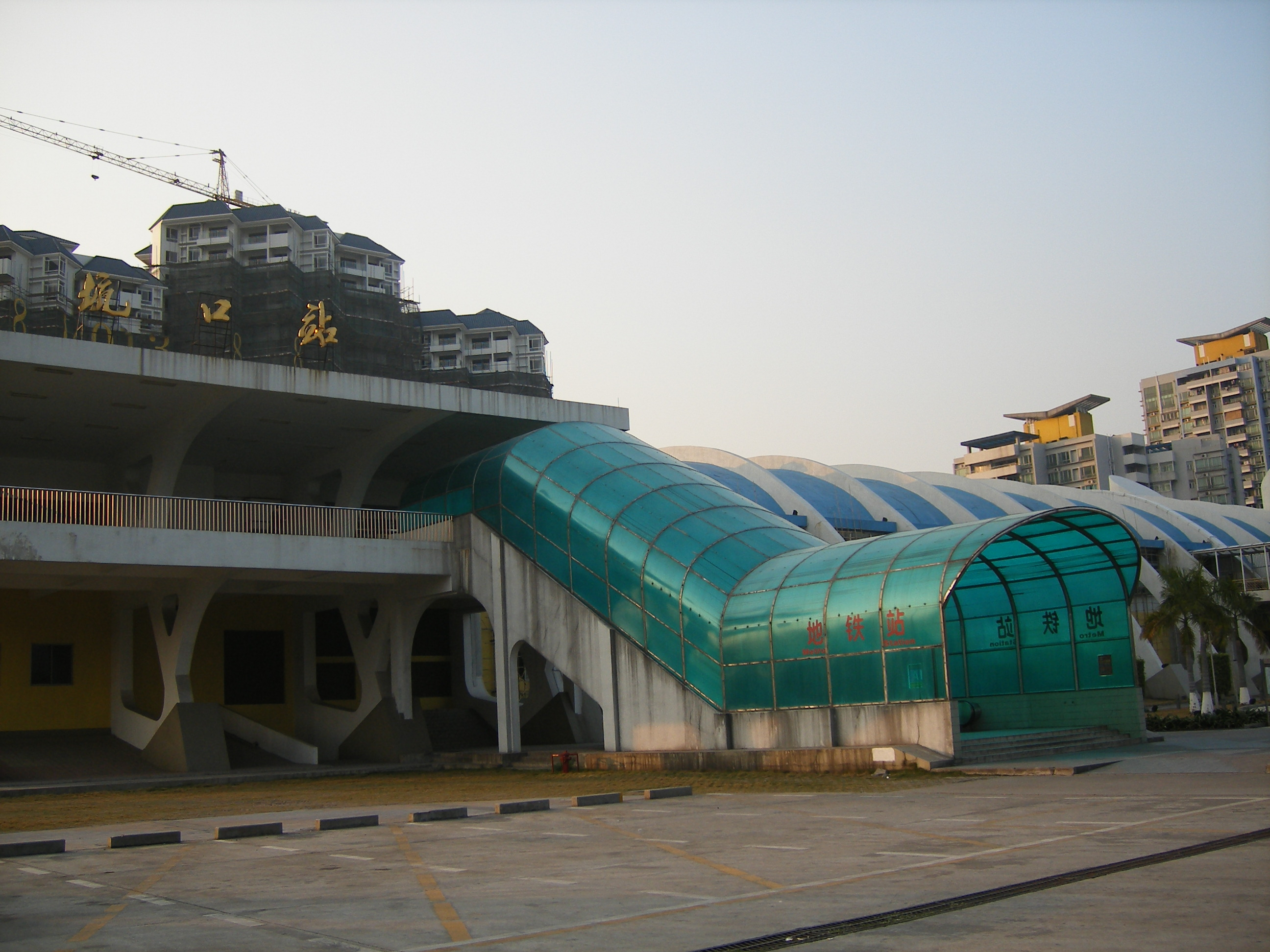
View outside Kengkou Station

Kengkou station (Chinese: 坑口站; Jyutping: haang^{1}hau^{2} zaam^{6}; Cantonese Yale: Hāangháu Jaahm) is a station of Line 1 of the Guangzhou Metro. It started operations on 28 June 1997. It was located at the ground level of the junction of Huadi Avenue Middle and Longxi Avenue in Fangcun, Liwan District. It is adjacent to Fangcun Coach Station (Chinese: 芳村客运站), the transportation hub for the western area of the Pearl River Delta.

== Station layout ==
F2; Concourse	Lobby	Customer Service, Shops, Vending machines, ATMs
G Platforms	Side platform, doors will open on the right
G Platforms	Platform 2	1 towards Xilang (Terminus)
G Platforms	Platform 1	1 towards Guangzhou East Railway Station (Huadiwan)
G Platforms	Side platform, doors will open on the right

== Exits ==
Exit number	Exit location
Exit A	Huadi Daodaozhong
Exit B	Huadi Daodaozhong
Exit C	Dongjiao Nanlu
Exit D	Dongjiao Nanlu
