= Huadiwan station =

Guangzhou Metro station

Coordinates: 23.08711°N 113.23401°E

Huadiwan 花地湾
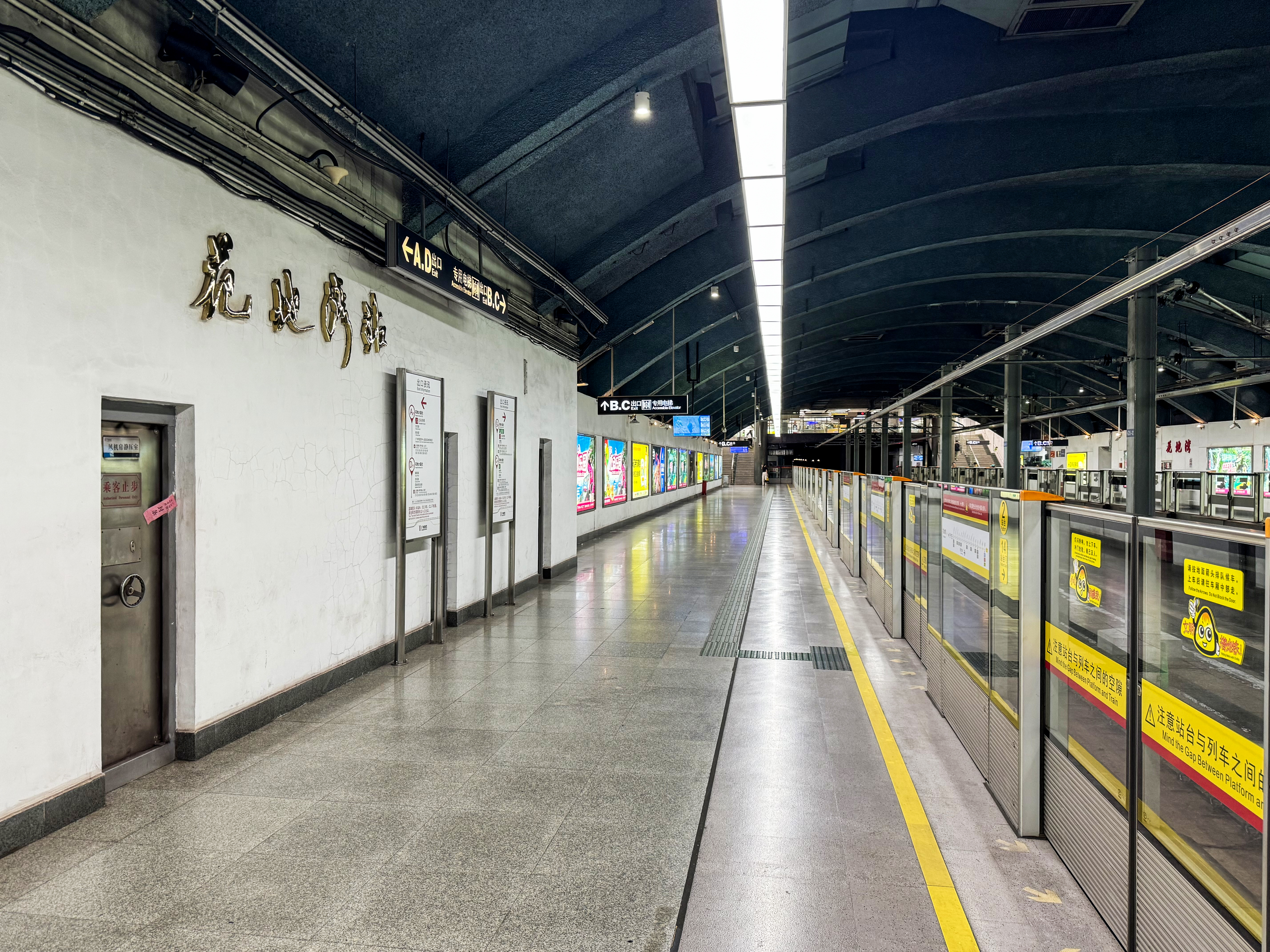

Chinese name
- Simplified Chinese: 花地湾站
- Traditional Chinese: 花地灣站
Transcriptions
Standard Mandarin
- Hanyu Pinyin: Huādìwān Zhàn
Yue: Cantonese
- Jyutping: faa^{1}dei^{2}waan^{1} zaam^{6}
- Hong Kong Romanization: Fa Tei Wan station

General information
- Location: Huadi Avenue North (花地大道北); Liwan District, Guangzhou, Guangdong; China
- Operated by: Guangzhou Metro Co. Ltd.
- Line: Line 1
- Platforms: 2 (2 side platforms)

Construction
- Structure type: Underground

Other information
- Station code: 103

History
- Opened: June 28, 1997; 29 years ago

Services
Preceding station	Guangzhou Metro	Following station
Kengkou towards Xilang	Line 1	Fangcun towards Guangzhou East Railway Station
Location

Huadiwan station (simplified Chinese: 花地湾站; traditional Chinese: 花地灣站; Jyutping: faa^{1} dei^{2} waan^{1} zaam^{6}; Cantonese Yale: Fādéiwāan Jaahm) is a metro station on Line 1 of the Guangzhou Metro that started operations on 28 June 1997. It is situated under Huadi Avenue North (花地大道北) in the Liwan District of Guangzhou City, Guangdong Province, China. It is near the Huadi Bird Fish & Insect Market (花地花鸟虫鱼市场).

The station is unique in being the only station on the Guangzhou Metro to use 'cut and cover' construction. The station is located in a large single-vault tunnel with two side platforms and two mezzanine-style concourses –one at each end of the platform. Half-height platform-edge-doors are used.

== Station layout ==
G	-	Exit
B1; Concourse	North Lobby	Customer Service, Shops, Vending machines, ATMs
B1; Concourse	South Lobby	Customer Service, Shops, Vending machines, ATMs
B2; Platforms	Side platform, doors will open on the right
B2; Platforms	Platform 2	1 towards Xilang (Kengkou)
B2; Platforms	Platform 1	1 towards Guangzhou East Railway Station (Fangcun)
B2; Platforms	Side platform, doors will open on the right

== Exits ==
Exit number	Exit location
Exit A	Huadi Dadaobei
Exit B	Huadi Dadaobei
Exit C	Huadi Dadaobei
Exit D	Huadi Dadaobei
