= Shiweitang station =

Guangzhou Metro Line 11 station

Shiweitang 石围塘
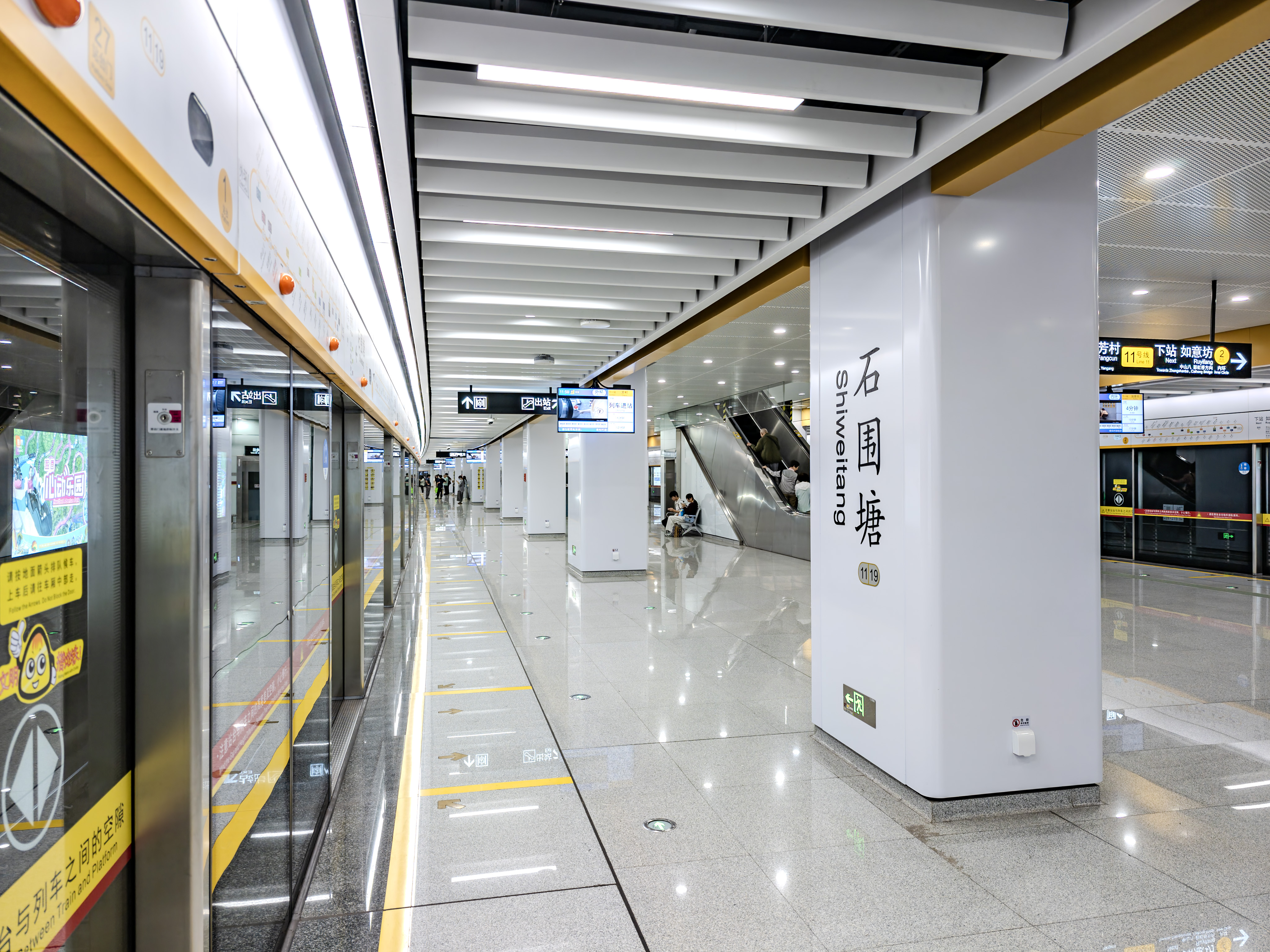
- Platform

Chinese name
- Simplified Chinese: 石围塘站
- Traditional Chinese: 石圍塘站
Transcriptions
Standard Mandarin
- Hanyu Pinyin: Shíwéitáng Zhàn
Yue: Cantonese
- Yale Romanization: Sekwàitòhng Jaahm
- Jyutping: Sek^{6}wai^{4}tong^{4} Zaam^{6}

General information
- Location: West of the intersection of Fangcun Avenue (芳村大道) and Shancun Road (山村路), Shiweitang Subdistrict; Liwan District, Guangzhou, Guangdong; China
- Coordinates: 23°6′22.46″N 113°13′12.36″E
- Operator: Guangzhou Metro Co. Ltd.
- Line: Line 11
- Platforms: 2 (1 island platform)
- Tracks: 2

Construction
- Structure type: Underground
- Accessible: Yes

Other information
- Station code: 1119

History
- Opened: 28 December 2024 (19 months ago)

Services
Preceding station	Guangzhou Metro	Following station
Fangcun Outer Circle	Line 11	Ruyifang Inner Circle
Location

Shiweitang Station (simplified Chinese: 石围塘站; traditional Chinese: 石圍塘站; pinyin: Shíwéitáng Zhàn; Cantonese Yale: Sekwàitòhng Jaahm) is a station on Line 11 of the Guangzhou Metro. It started operations on 28 December 2024. It is located underground at the west of the intersection of Fangcun Avenue and Shancun Road in Liwan District.

There is a set of double storage lines on the east side of the station which facilitate as train sidings.

== Station layout ==
G	-	Exits C & D
L1	Lobby	Ticket Machines, Customer Service, Shops, Police Station, Security Facilities
L2	Mezzanine	Station Equipment
L3; Platforms	Platform 2	11 Inner Circle (Ruyifang)
L3; Platforms	Island platform, doors will open on the left (Toilets, Nursery)
L3; Platforms	Platform 1	11 Outer Circle (Fangcun)

=== Entrances/exits ===
The station has 2 points of entry/exit. Exit C is equipped with an elevator.

- C: Fangcun Avenue Middle
- D: Fangcun Avenue Middle
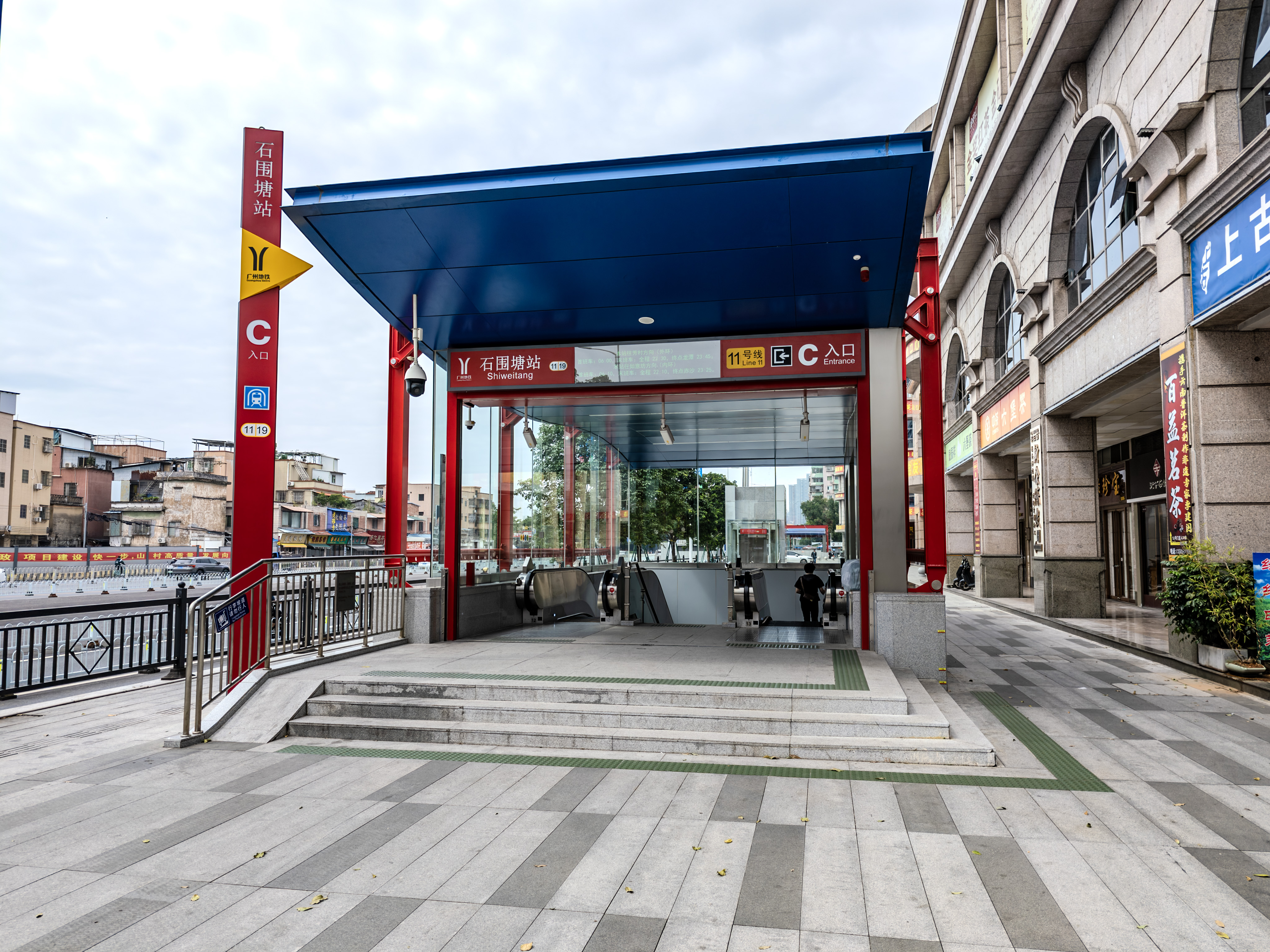
Entrance C

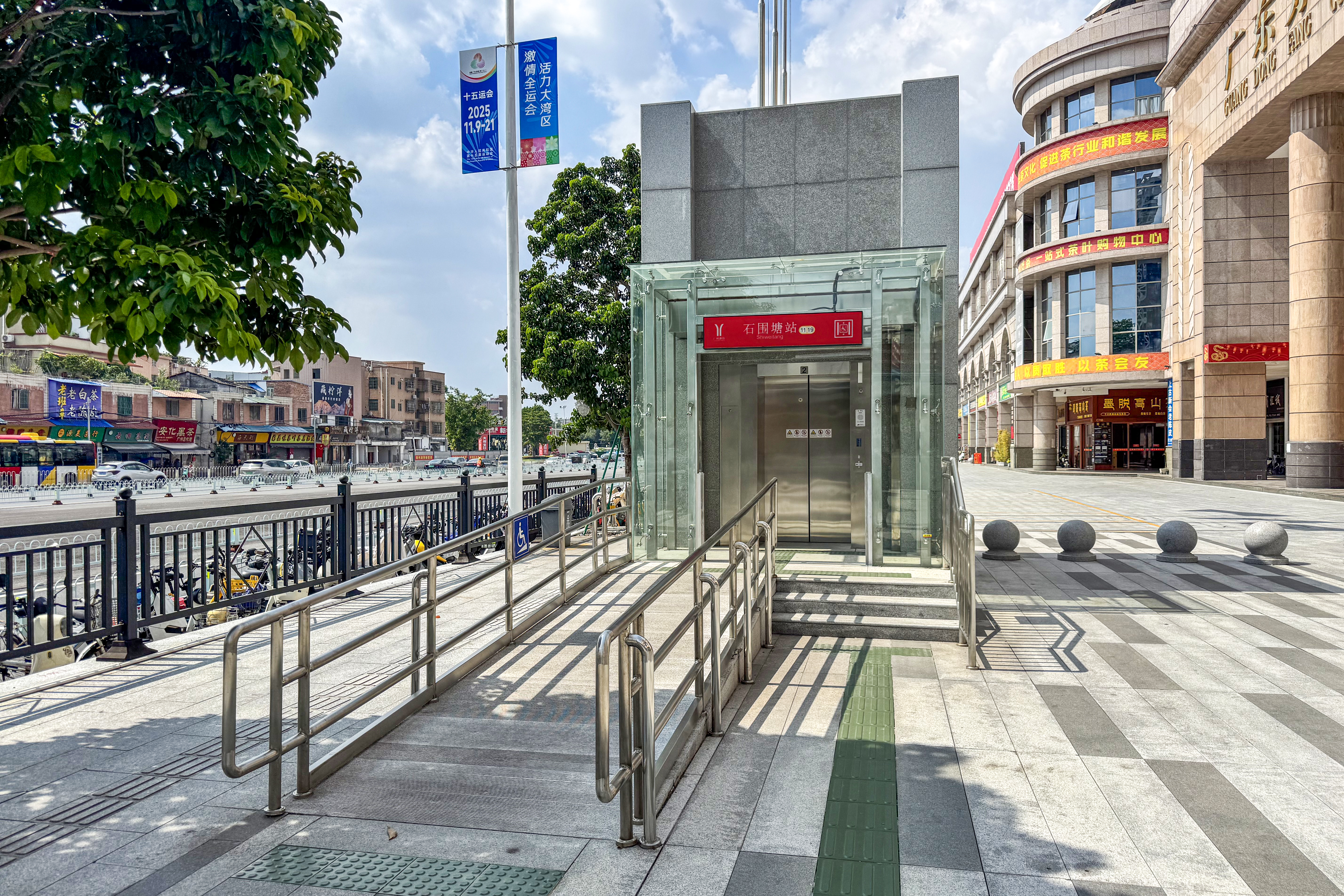
Elevator of Entrance C

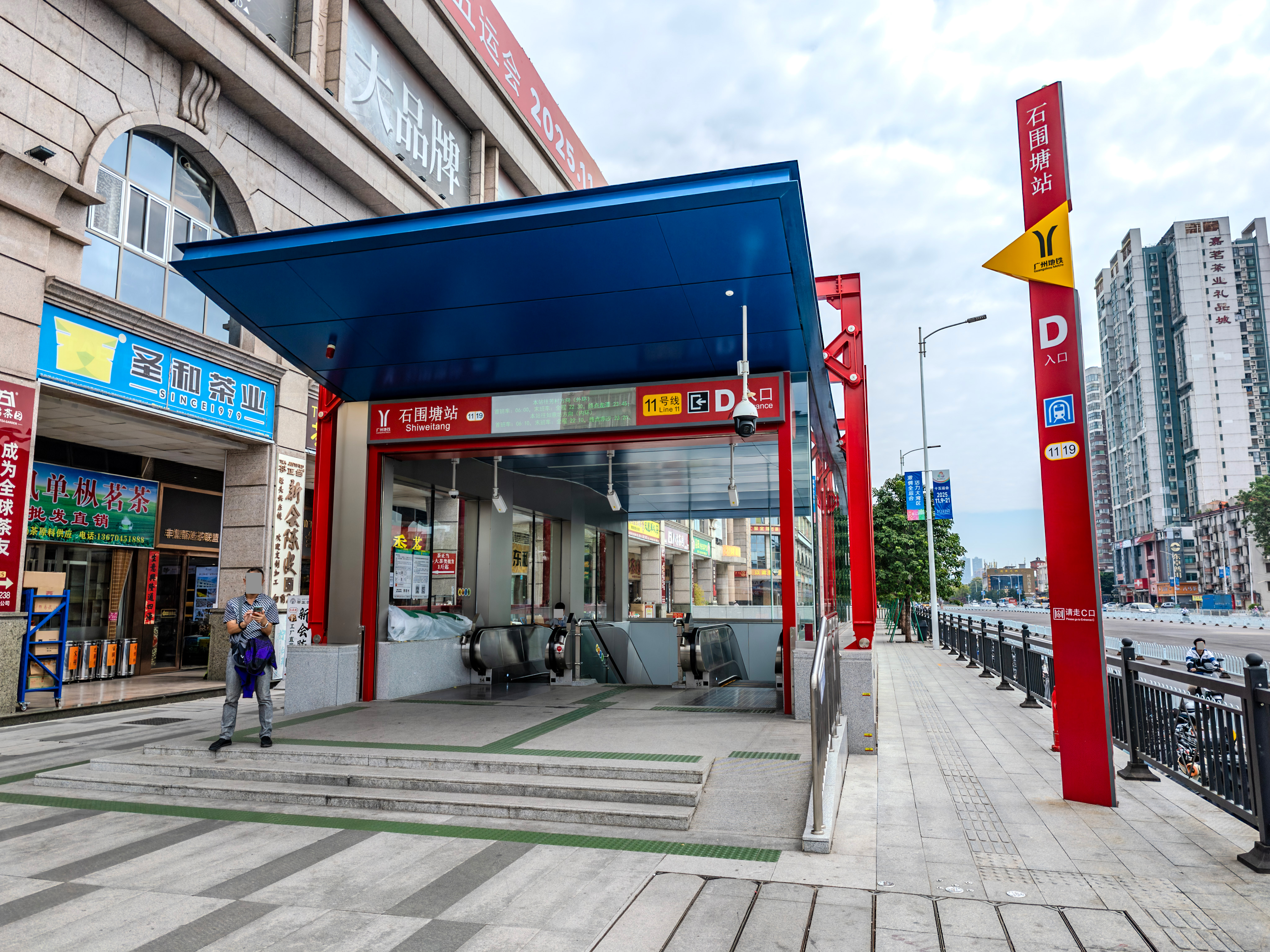
Entrance D

== Gallery ==
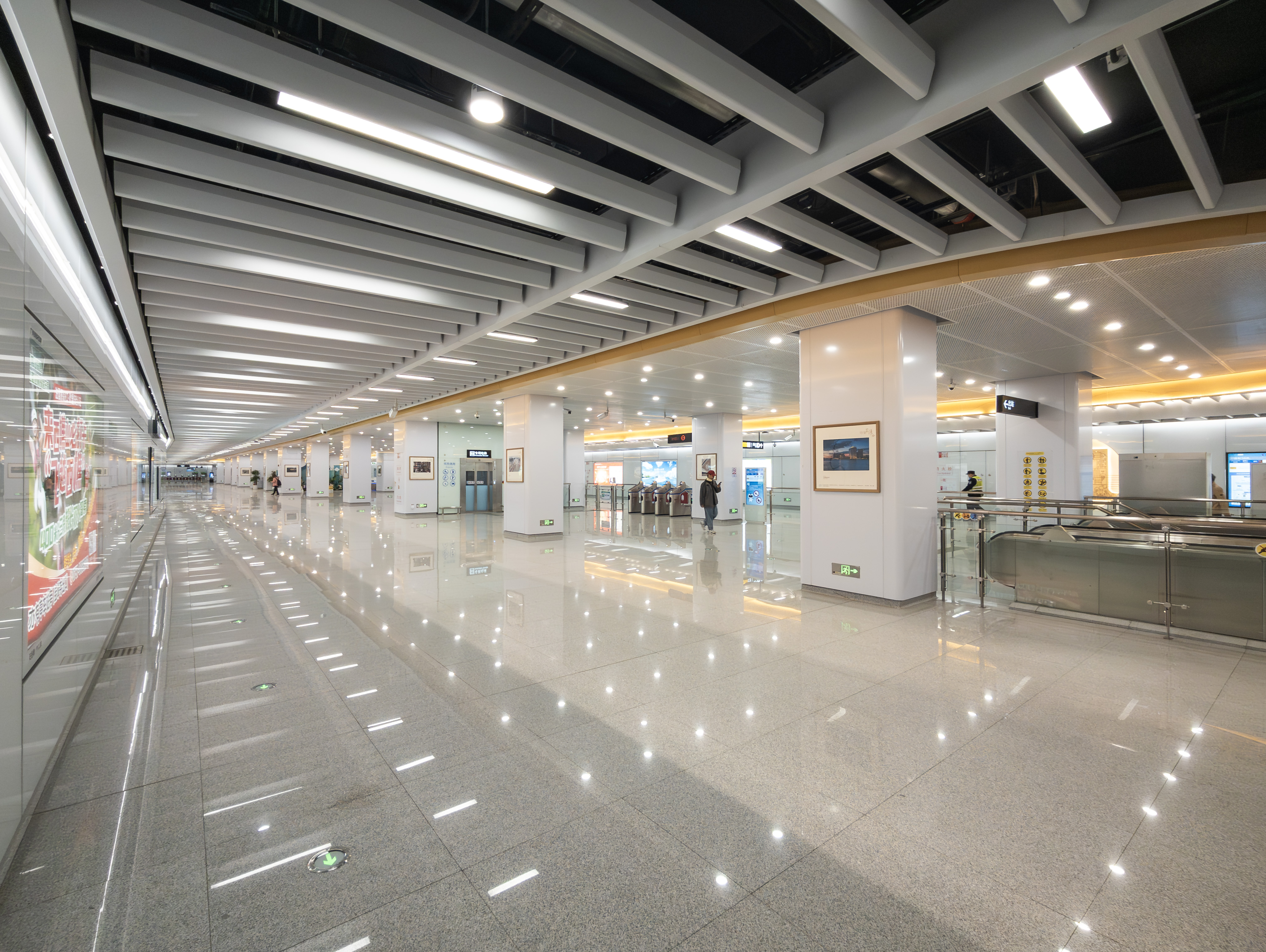
Concourse

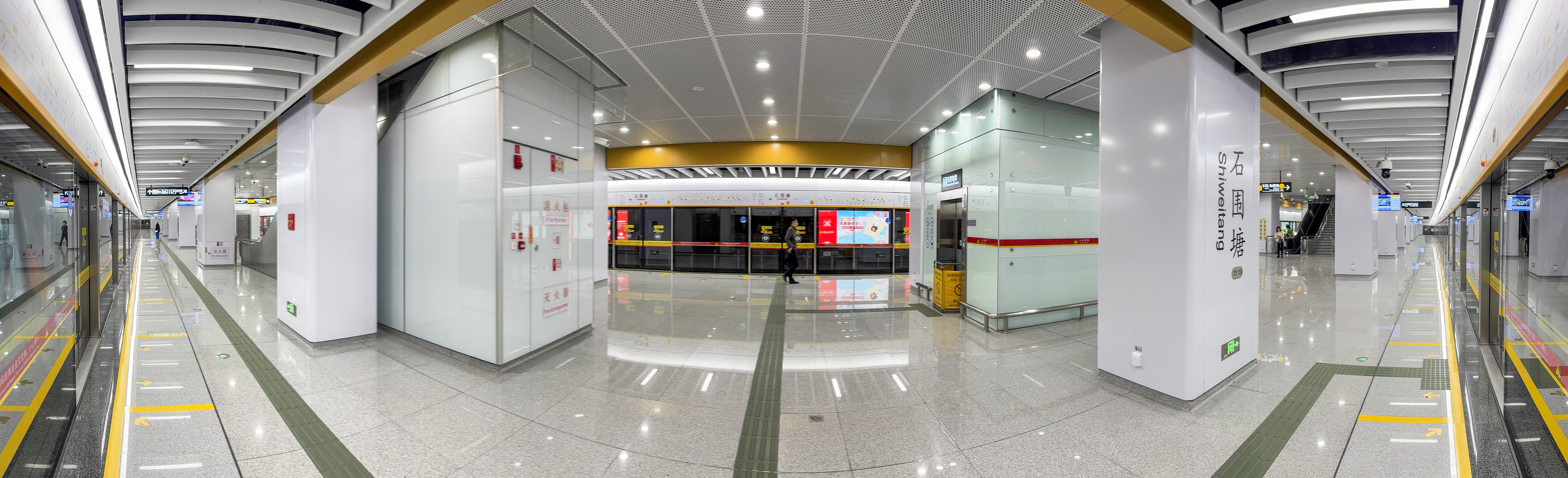
Platform 2 panorama

== History ==
Due to the impact of the early expropriation and demolition and the adjustment of the line planning, the station was postponed until 2019 to start the engineering work of the cross-line bridge section from Huadi River to Shiweitang on Fangcun Avenue, and on 28 March 2020, the Shiweitang railway cross-line bridge was enclosed and demolished again. It is the latest station for Line 11 to start construction.

On 10 April 2022, the construction of the underground diaphragm wall was completed, and the main structure was topped out on 18 March 2023.

On 28 December 2024, the station was put into use with the opening of Line 11.
