= Fangcun station =

Guangzhou Metro Lines 1, 11 and 22 station

Fangcun 芳村
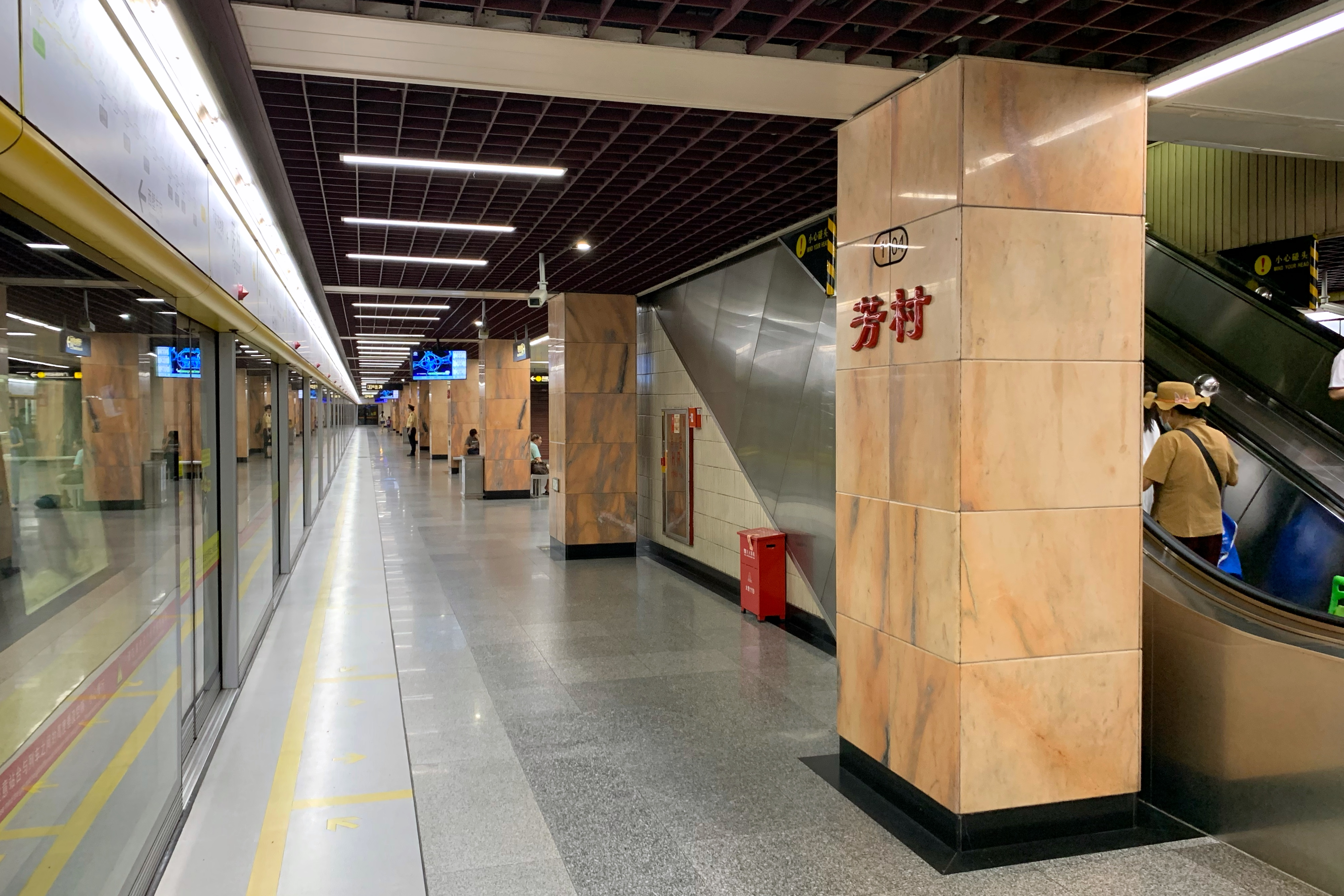
- Line 1 platform 2 (towards Xilang)

Chinese name
- Chinese: 芳村站
Transcriptions
Standard Mandarin
- Hanyu Pinyin: Fāngcūn Zhàn
Yue: Cantonese
- Yale Romanization: Fōngchyūn Jaahm
- Jyutping: Fong^{1}cyun^{1} Zaam^{6}
- Hong Kong Romanization: Fong Tsuen station

General information
- Location: Intersection of Huadi Avenue North (花地大道北) and Fangcun Avenue Middle (芳村大道中), Huadi Subdistrict; Liwan District, Guangzhou, Guangdong; China
- Coordinates: 23°6′4.59″N 113°13′50.07″E
- Operator: Guangzhou Metro Co. Ltd. Guangdong Intercity Railway Operation Co., Ltd. (Line 22)
- Lines: Line 1; Line 11; Line 22
- Platforms: 6 (3 island platforms)
- Tracks: 6

Construction
- Structure type: Underground
- Accessible: Yes

Other information
- Station code: 104 1120 2208

History
- Opened: Line 1: 28 June 1997 (29 years ago); Line 11: 28 December 2024 (22 months ago); Line 22: 29 December 2025 (10 months ago)

Services
Preceding station	Guangzhou Metro	Following station
Huadiwan towards Xilang	Line 1	Huangsha towards Guangzhou East Railway Station
Dachongkou Outer Circle	Line 11	Shiweitang Inner Circle
Terminus	Line 22	Xilang towards Panyu Square
Location

Fangcun station (Chinese: 芳村站; Jyutping: fong^{1} cyun^{1} zaam^{6}; Cantonese Yale: Fōngchyūn Jaahm) is an interchange station between Line 1, Line 11 and Line 22 of the Guangzhou Metro. Line 1 started operations on 28 June 1997, Line 11 started operations on 28 December 2024 and Line 22 started operations on 29 December 2025. It is the current northern terminus of Line 22.

It is situated under the junction of Huadi Avenue North (花地大道北) and Fangcun Avenue Middle (芳村大道中) in Fangcun in the Liwan District. The station has six main exits (lettered from A-E) at each of the four corners of the concourse. The station is popular with revellers visiting the popular Bai'etan riverside bar street on Changdi Street approx 10 minutes walk from the station, as well as shoppers going to the large superstore located nearby.

== Transport connections ==
There are several bus stops nearby including the Fangcun Interchange station on Huadi Dadao at the southern entrance to the Zhujiang Tunnel, which is a major hub for cross-river buses. The Fangcun-Huangsha foot/cycle ferry runs from nearby Changdi Road. There is a staffed bicycle park outside Exit B of the station.

== Station layout ==
The station has 3 parts: Line 1 and Line 22, which are located under Huadi Avenue North and Line 11 located at the middle and lower part of Fangcun Avenue, the three stations forming a T-shape via a counterclockwise rotation of 45 degrees. It is surrounded by Huadi Avenue North, Fangcun Avenue Central, Luju Road, Bai'etan Greater Bay Area Art Center, The Affiliated Brain Hospital of Guangzhou Medical University and Bai'etan International Financial Center.

For Line 11, toilets and a nursery room are located at the eastern end of the Line 11 platform towards Dachongkou, and for Line 22, they are located near Exit G in the non-paid area of the station and at the north end of the platforms.

=== Line 1 ===
Line 1 has two underground floors, with the ground level being the entrance/exit, the first floor being the concourse and the second floor being the platform. With a total length of 689 meters, the Line 1 station was the longest underground station in Asia when it was completed, including the underground shopping street and the turnback line below.

G	-	Exits A1, A2, B1
L1; Concourse	1 Lobby	Ticket Machines, Customer Service, Shops, Police Station, Security Facilities, Transfer to Lines 11 and 22
L2; Platforms	Platform 2	1 towards Xilang (Huadiwan)
L2; Platforms	Island platform, doors will open on the left
L2; Platforms	Platform 1	1 towards Guangzhou East Railway Station (Huangsha)

=== Line 11 ===
Line 11 has 3 underground floors, with the ground level being the entrance/exit, the first floor being the concourse, the second floor being the equipment level and the third floor being the platform.

G	-	Exits C-E
L1; Concourse	11 Lobby	Ticket Machines, Customer Service, Shops, Police Station, Security Facilities, Transfer to Lines 1 and 22
L2	-	Station Equipment
L3; Platforms	Platform 4	11 Inner Circle (Shiweitang)
L3; Platforms	Island platform, doors will open on the left (Toilets, Nursery)
L3; Platforms	Platform 3	11 Outer Circle (Dachongkou)

=== Line 22 ===
Line 22 has 4 underground floors totaling 392 meters in length, with the ground level being the entrance/exit, the first floor being the concourse, in which the upper mezzanine is the overhead passage to the interface and paid area of Line 1. The second floor is the equipment level and the transfer mezzanine toward Line 11 awaiting construction, the third floor is the mezzanine between the concourse and the Line 22 platforms, and the fourth floor is the Line 22 platform.

G	-	Exits F-H
Mezzanine	Overhead passage	Towards Exits F-H and Line 22 concourse, Security Facilities, Towards Lines 1 and 11 (L1)
L1; Concourse	22 Lobby	Ticket Machines, Customer Service, Shops, Police Station, Security Facilities, Toilets, Nursery, Transfer to Lines 1 and 11
L2	Transfer Mezzanine	Towards Line 11 (U/C)
L2	-	Station Equipment
L3	Mezzanine	Towards Concourse and Platforms
	-	Reserved transfer mezzanine
L4; Platforms	Platform 5	22 reserved platform
L4; Platforms	Island platform, doors will open on the right (Toilets, Nursery)
L4; Platforms	Platform 6	22 towards Panyu Square (Xilang)

=== Concourses ===
There are 3 concourse sections each for Line 1, Line 11 and Line 22. The Line 1 and Line 11 concourses are located on the first floor, and the Line 22 concourse is located on the second floor. The east side of the Line 1 concourse, the middle of the Line 11 concourse and the east side and the overhead passageways of the Line 22 concourse are separated into fare-paid areas, and the Line 11 fare-paid area is extended to the interface with the Line 1 concourse to cooperate with transfers. Due to the height difference between the two concourses, there is a staircase and a ramp.

Line 22 is connected to the Line 1 concourse through the station body to transfer between the two lines. Due to the different floors of the concourses of the two lines, there are elevators, stairs and 2 escalators to connect them. In order to reduce the impact of station construction on surface traffic, only the escalators on the north side are installed in the early stage to connect the two lines, and construction of the 4 escalators in the south is suspended for the time being.

All concourses have elevators, escalators and stairs for passengers to reach the platforms. The concourses also have automatic ticket vending machines and intelligent customer service centers. There is also a 7-Eleven, convenience stores, bakeries and other vending machines.

The station is a intangible cultural heritage characteristic station on Line 11.

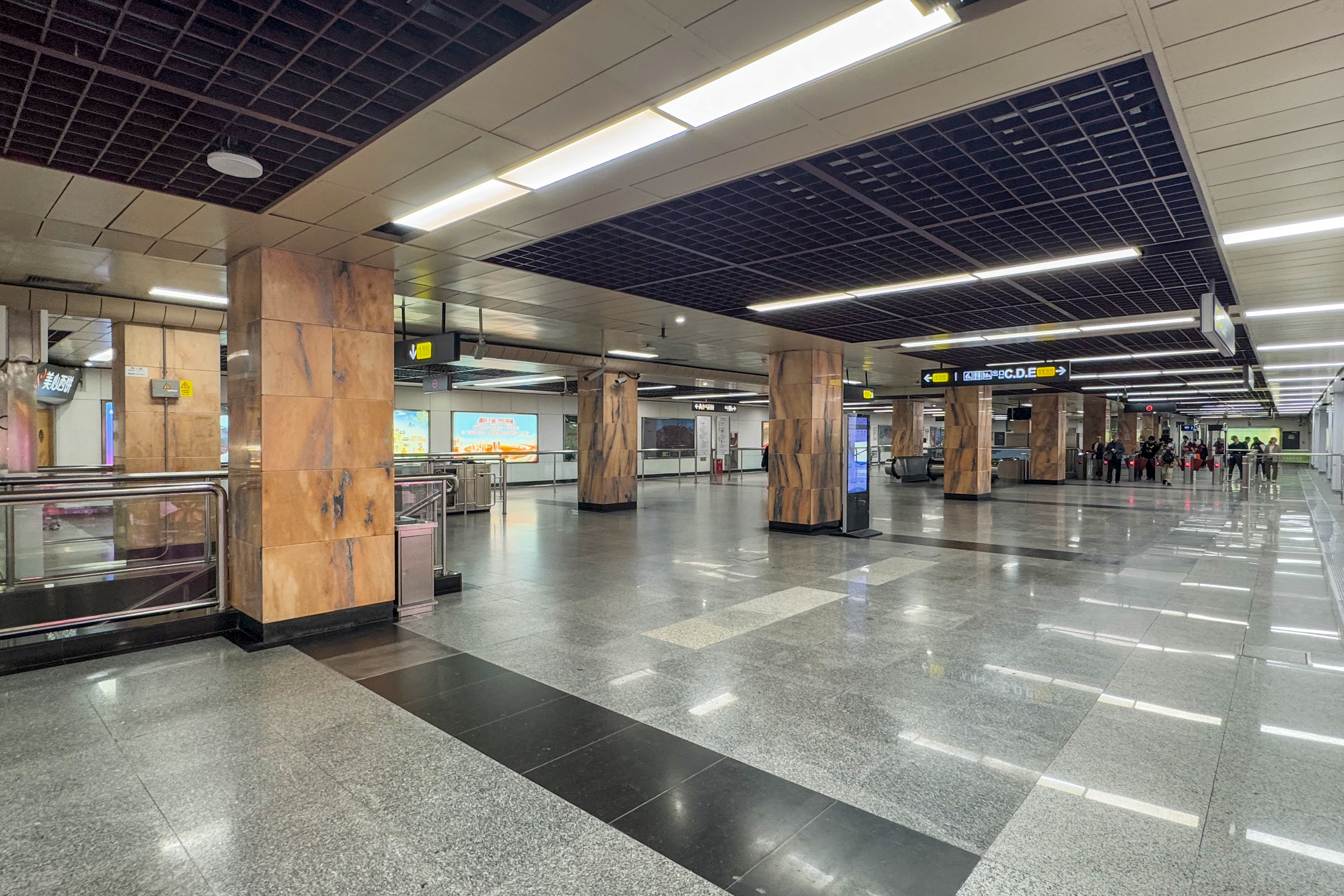
Line 1 concourse

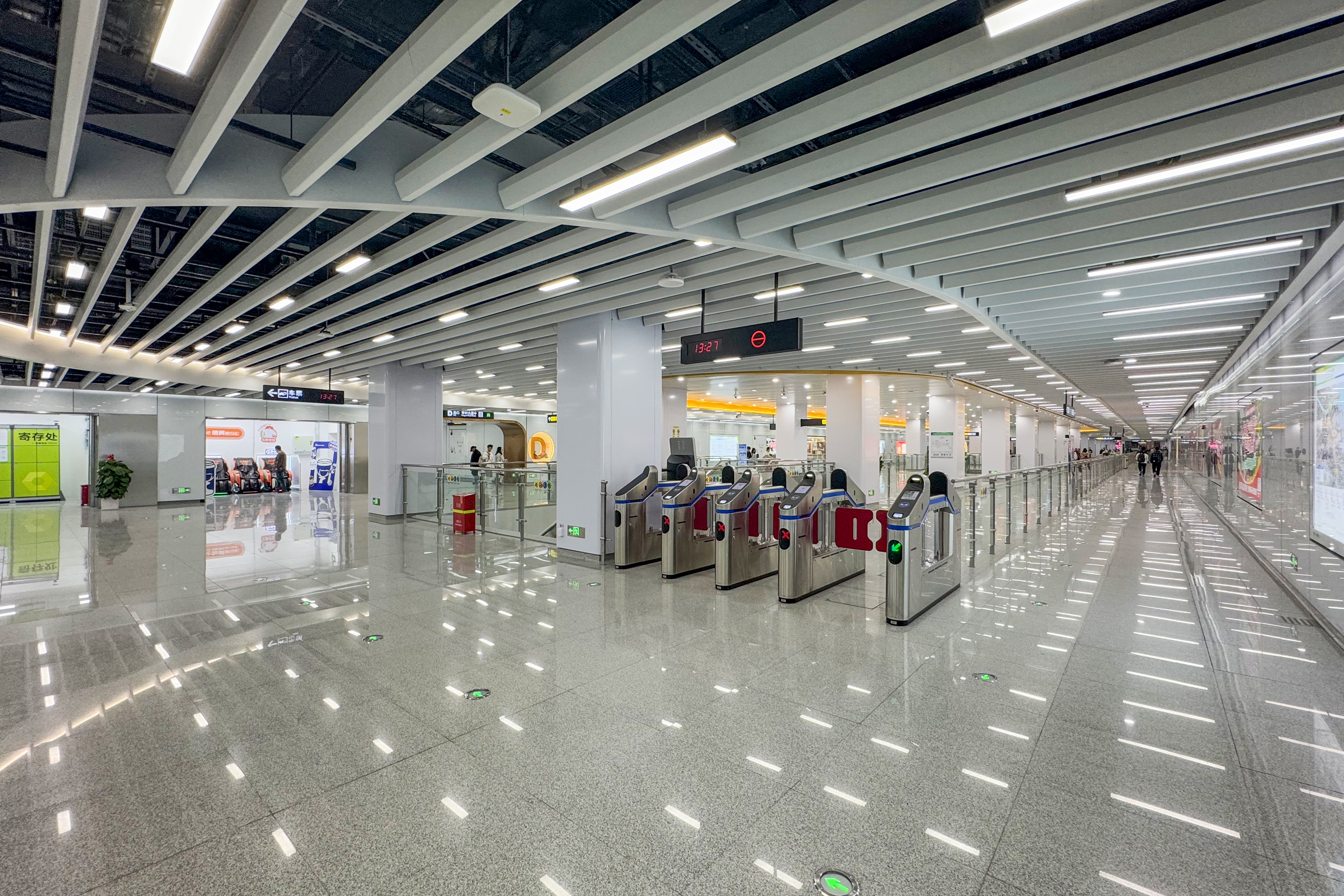
Line 11 concourse (from west facing east)

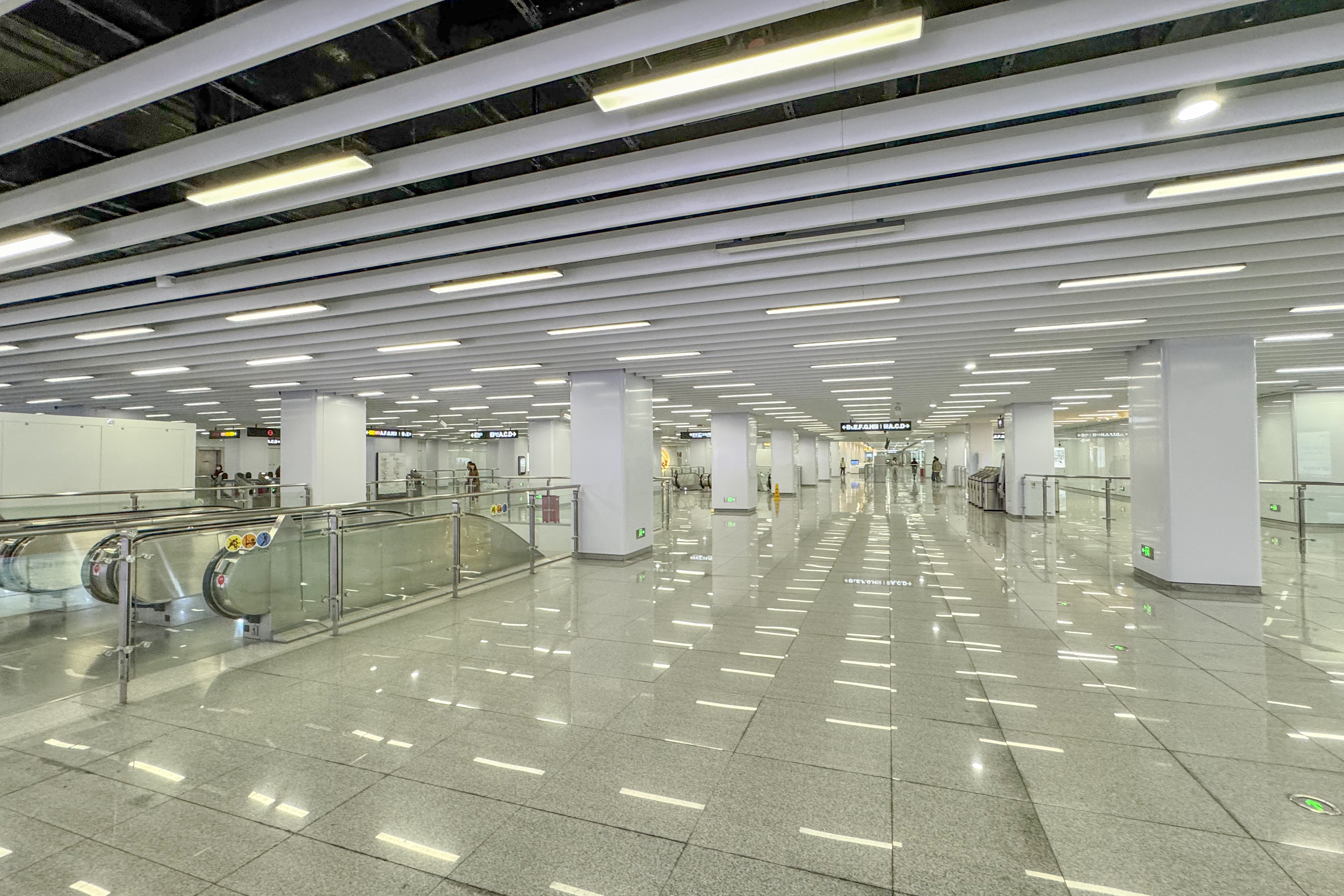
Line 11 concourse (from east facing west)

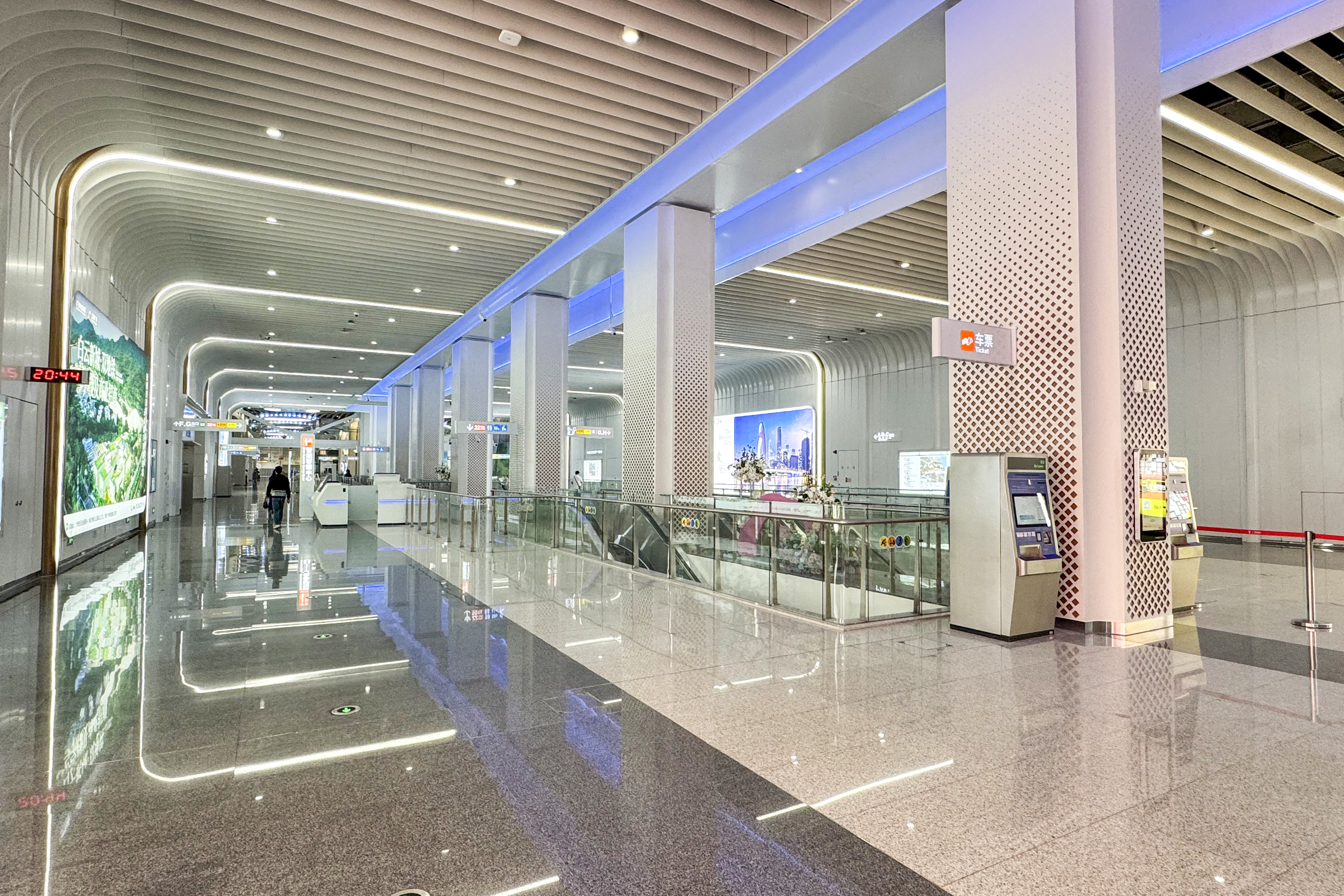
Line 22 concourse (south portion)

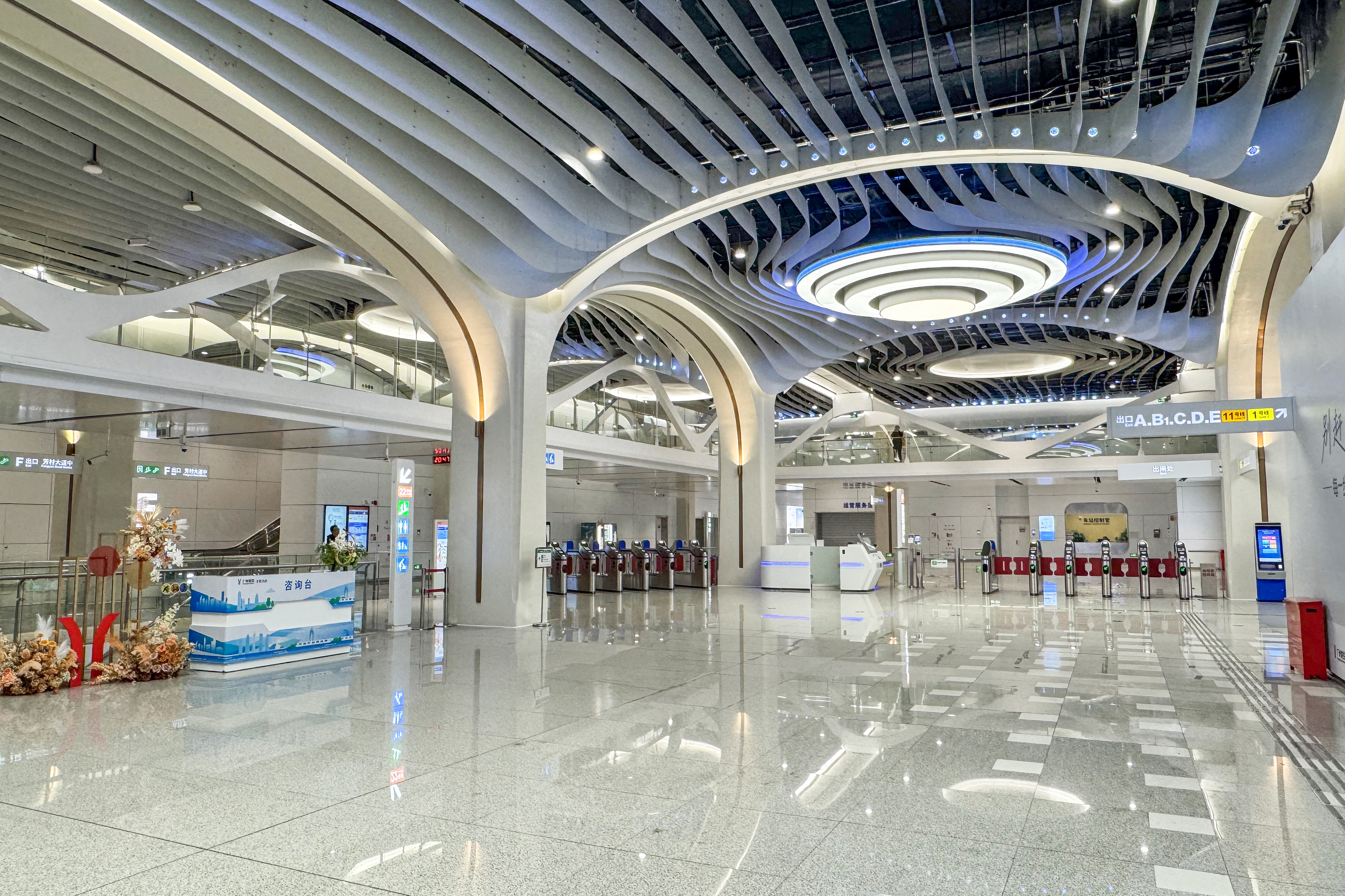
Line 22 concourse (north portion)

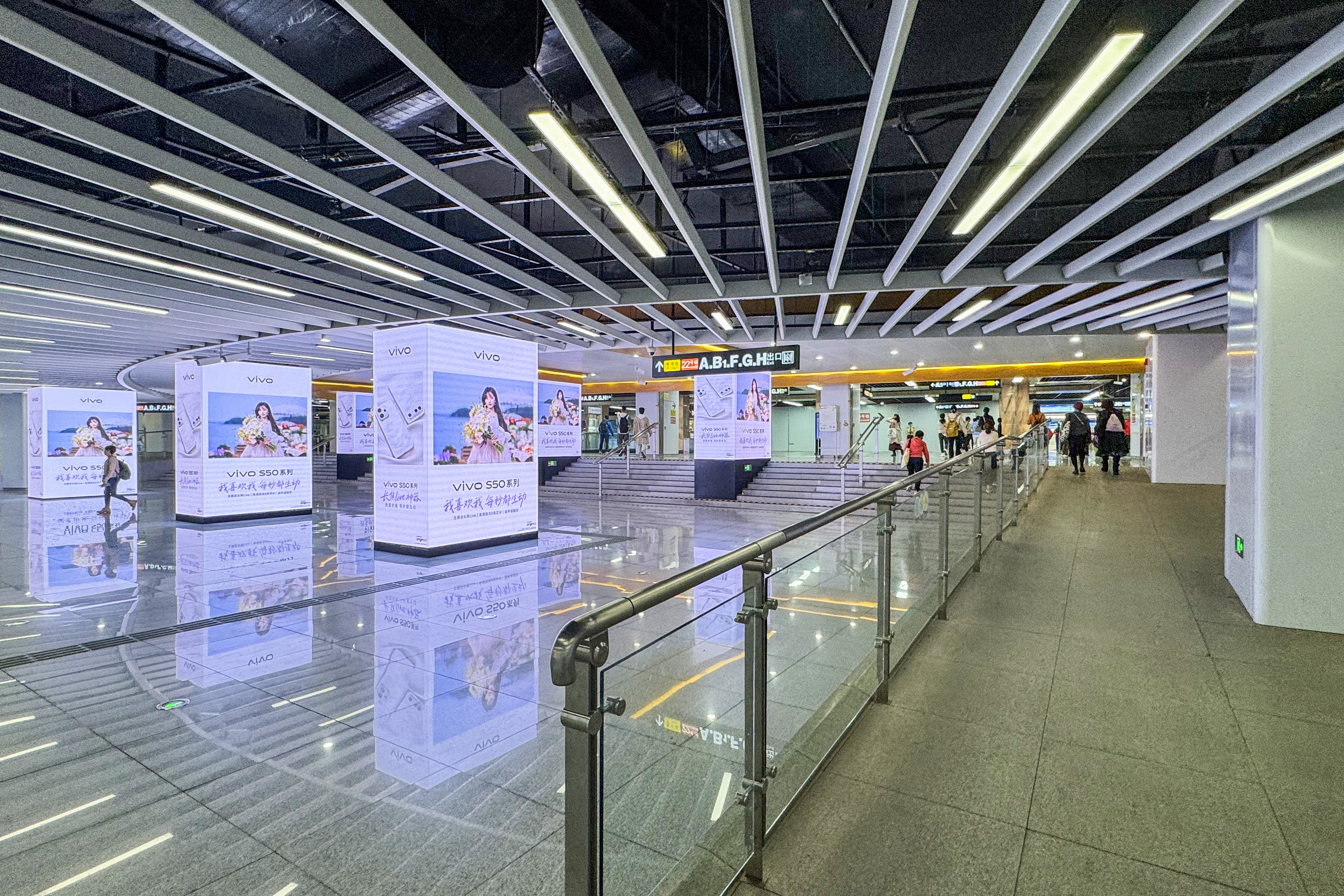
Transfer staircase and ramp between Lines 1 and 11

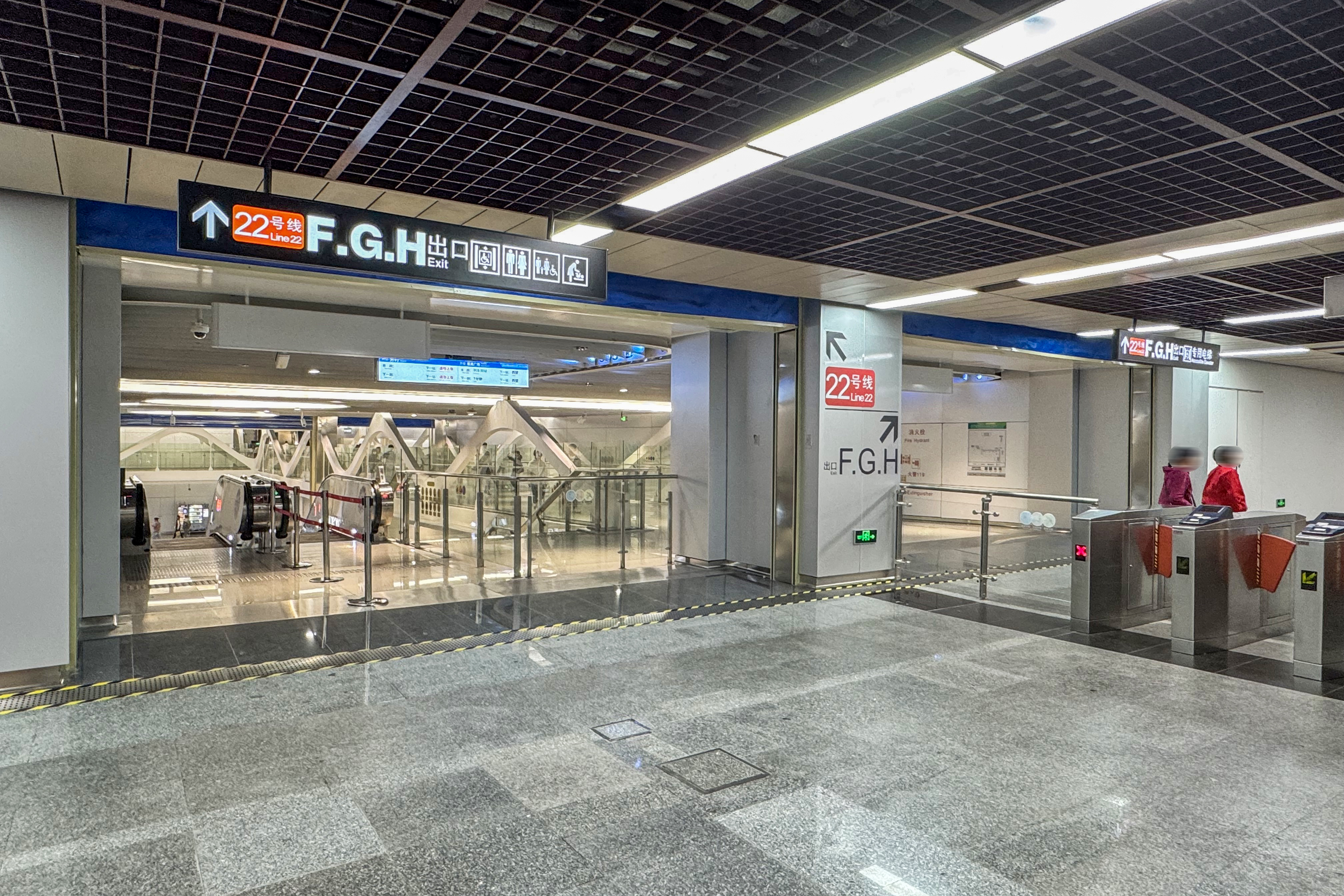
Transfer interface between Lines 1 and 22, with escalators installed in the paid area

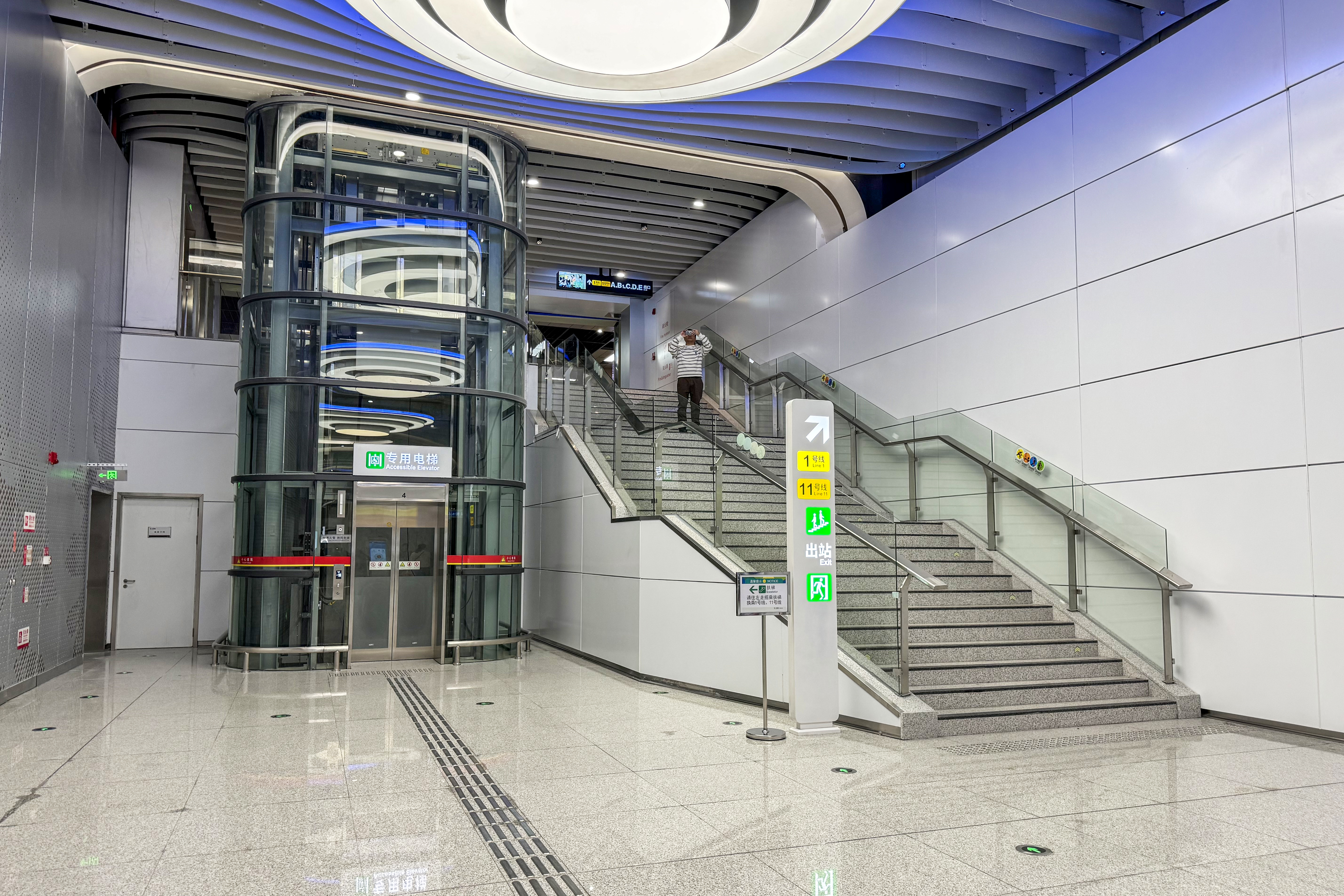
Transfer elevator and stairs between Lines 1 and 22

=== Platforms ===
Line 1, Line 11 and Line 22 each have an underground island platform, of which the Line 1 and Line 22 platforms are located under Huadi Avenue and the Line 11 platform is located under Fangcun Avenue. Line 1 is on the upper level, Line 11 is on the middle level and Line 22 is in the lower level.

In addition, the west end of the Line 11 platforms and the middle and north side of the Line 22 platforms have reserved interfaces to the transfer level, which is left for the second phase of the upgrade project, and can be used to transfer between the two lines and Line 28 after completion.

There is a set of double storage lines between the south side of the Line 1 station. When the southern section of Line 1 is disrupted or a typhoon strikes and the at-grade section needs to be suspended, trains to Xilang will turn back through these storage lines, using this station as the temporary terminus.

There is also a storage line at the north end of the Line 22 station, where the north end of the main line is reserved for the Fangbai Intercity extension, and the south end of the platform is equipped with a single crossing line. In addition, there is a connecting line connecting Line 22 and Line 28 (Fosuiguan Intercity) at the southbound track toward Panyu Square. During the construction of Line 22, the turn-out location and related civil structures of the connecting line have been reserved for Line 28 construction.

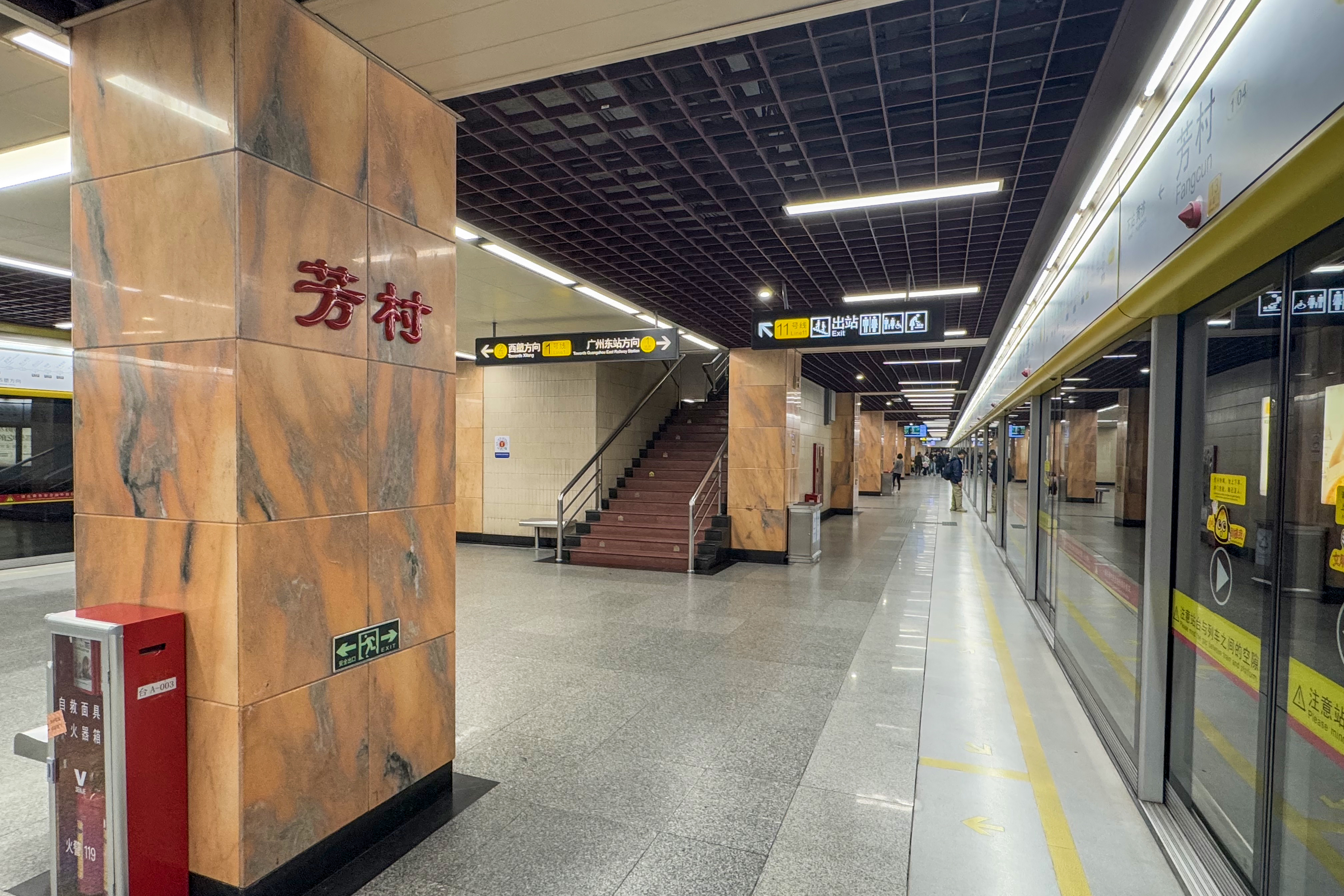
Line 1 platform

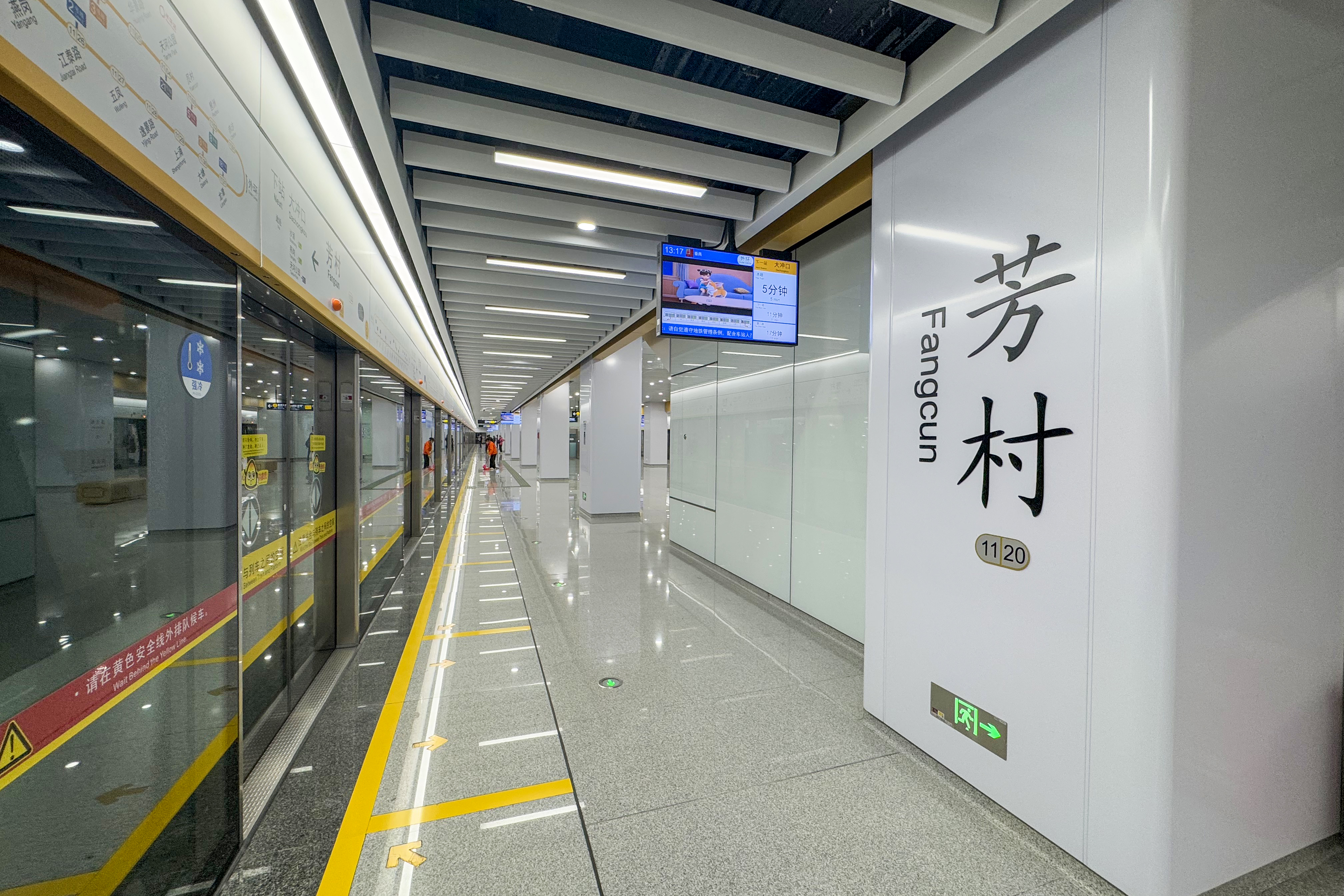
Line 11 platform 3 (Outer Circle platform)

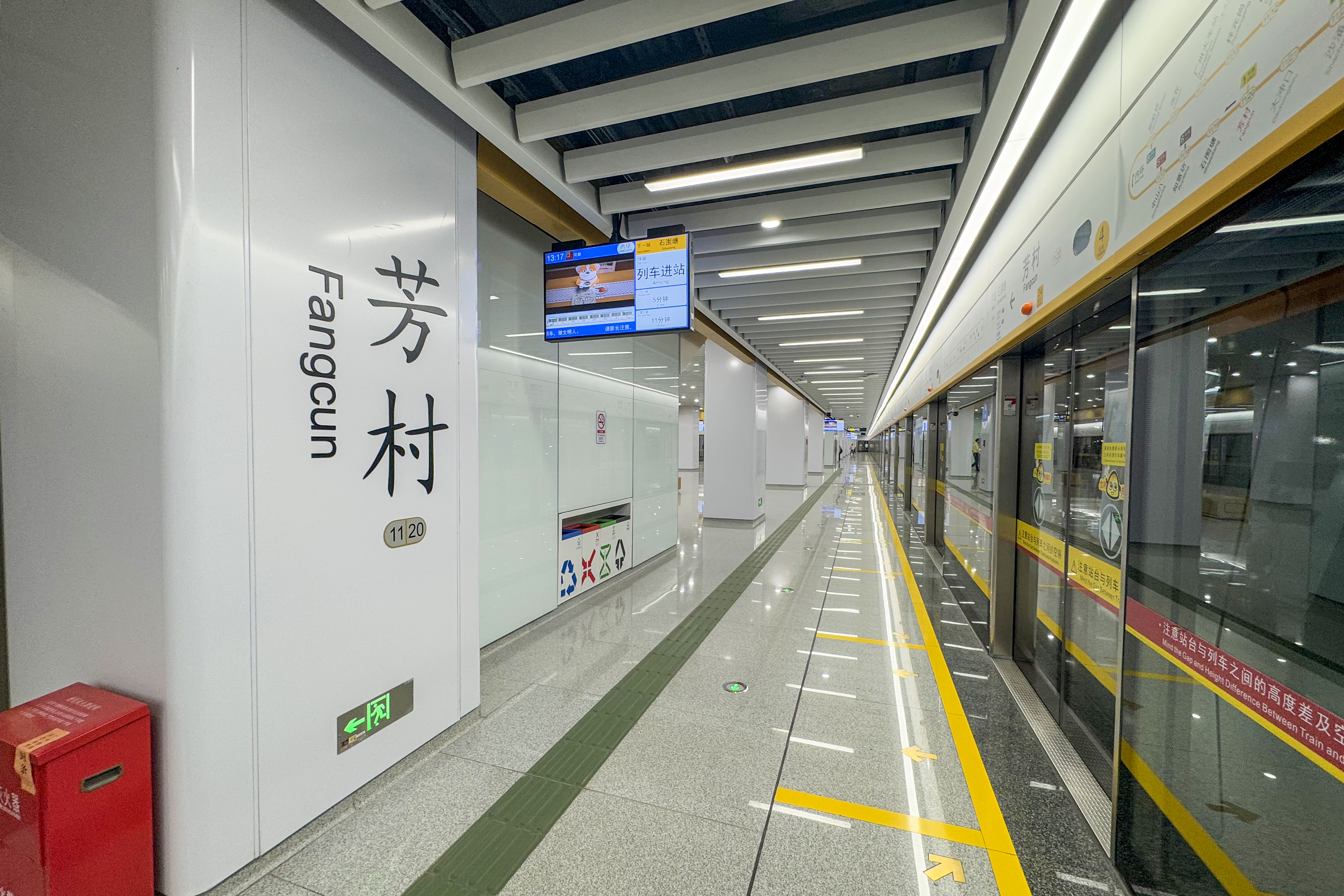
Line 11 platform 4 (Inner Circle platform)

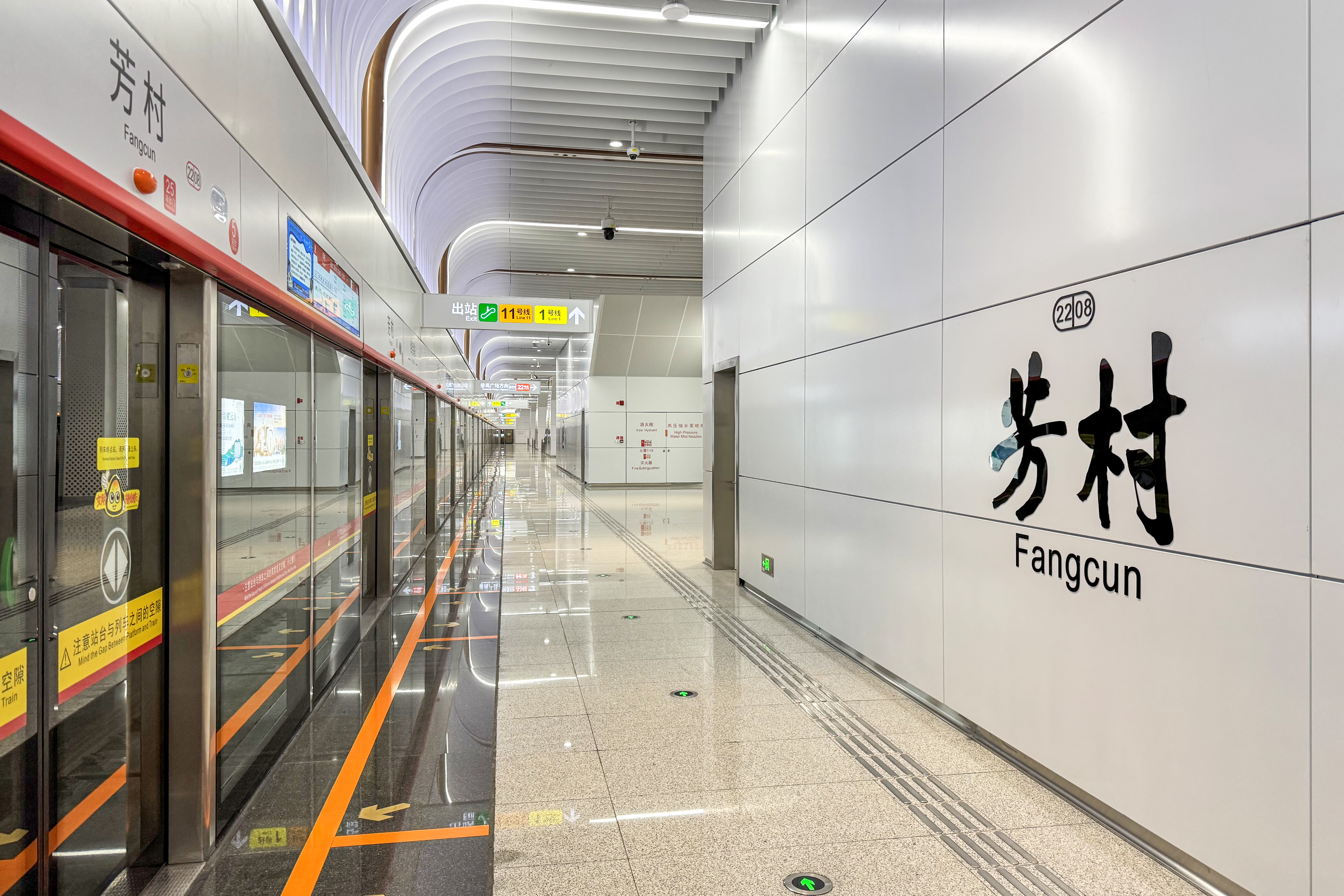
Line 22 platform 5 (reserved platform)

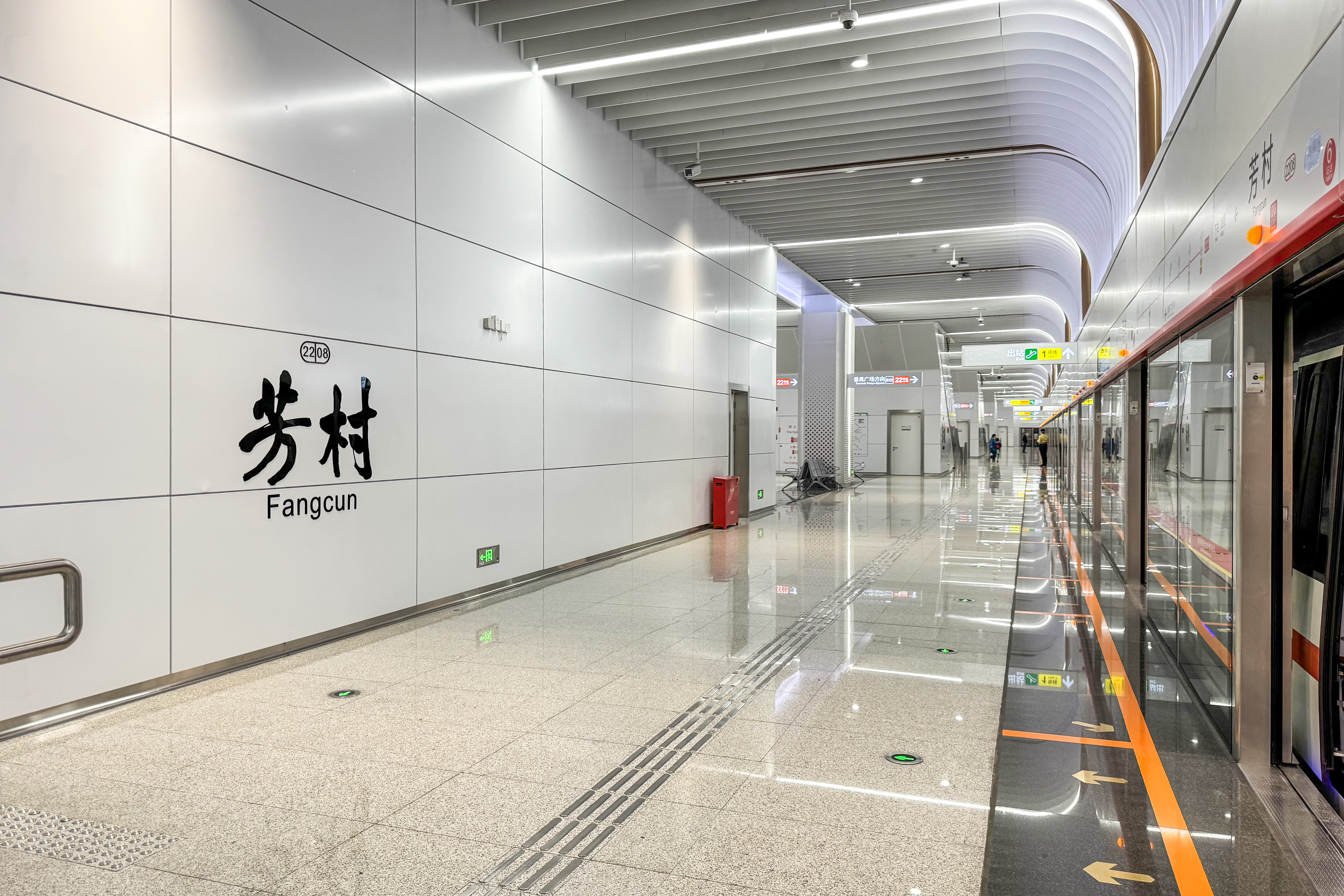
Line 22 platform 6 (toward Panyu Square)
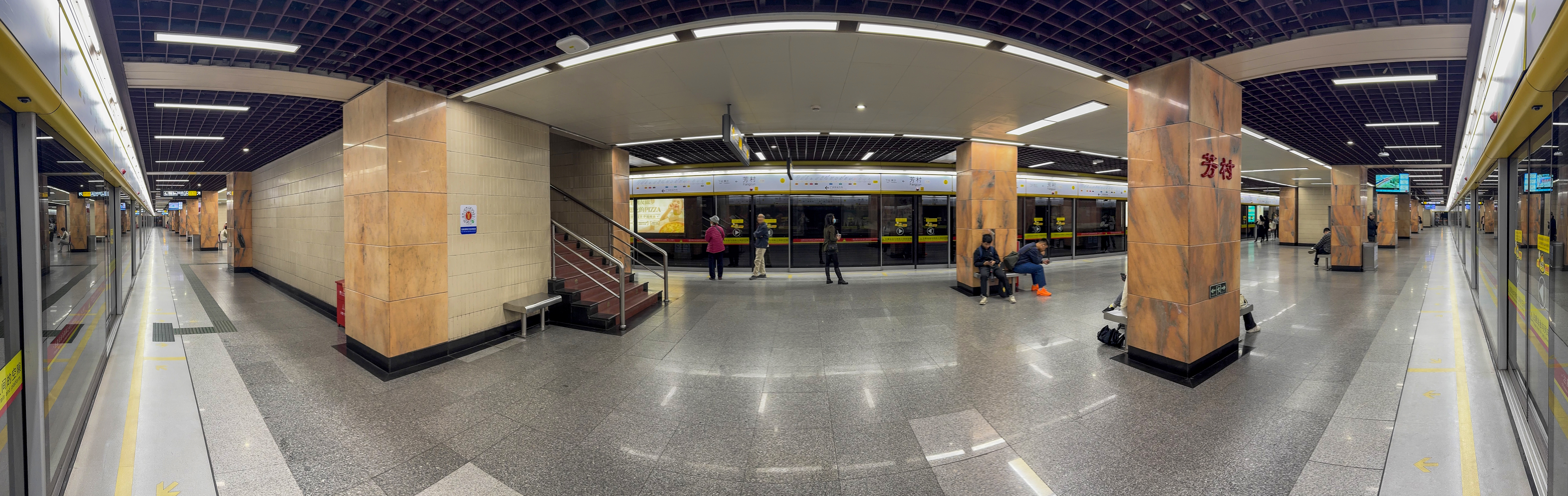
Line 1 platform panorama
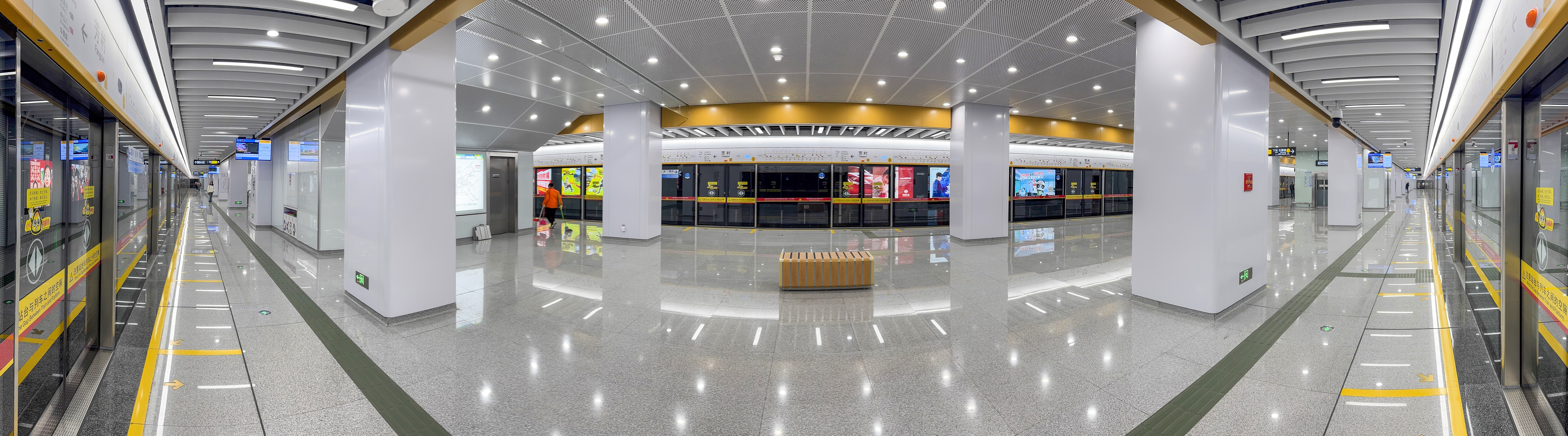
Line 11 platform panorama
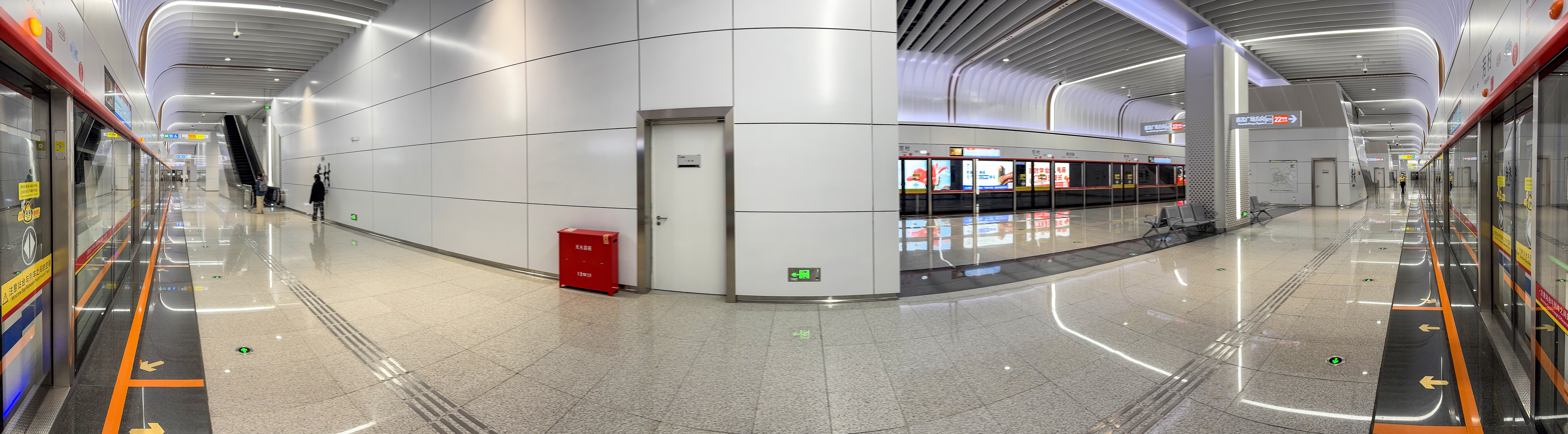
Line 22 platform panorama

=== Entrances/exits ===
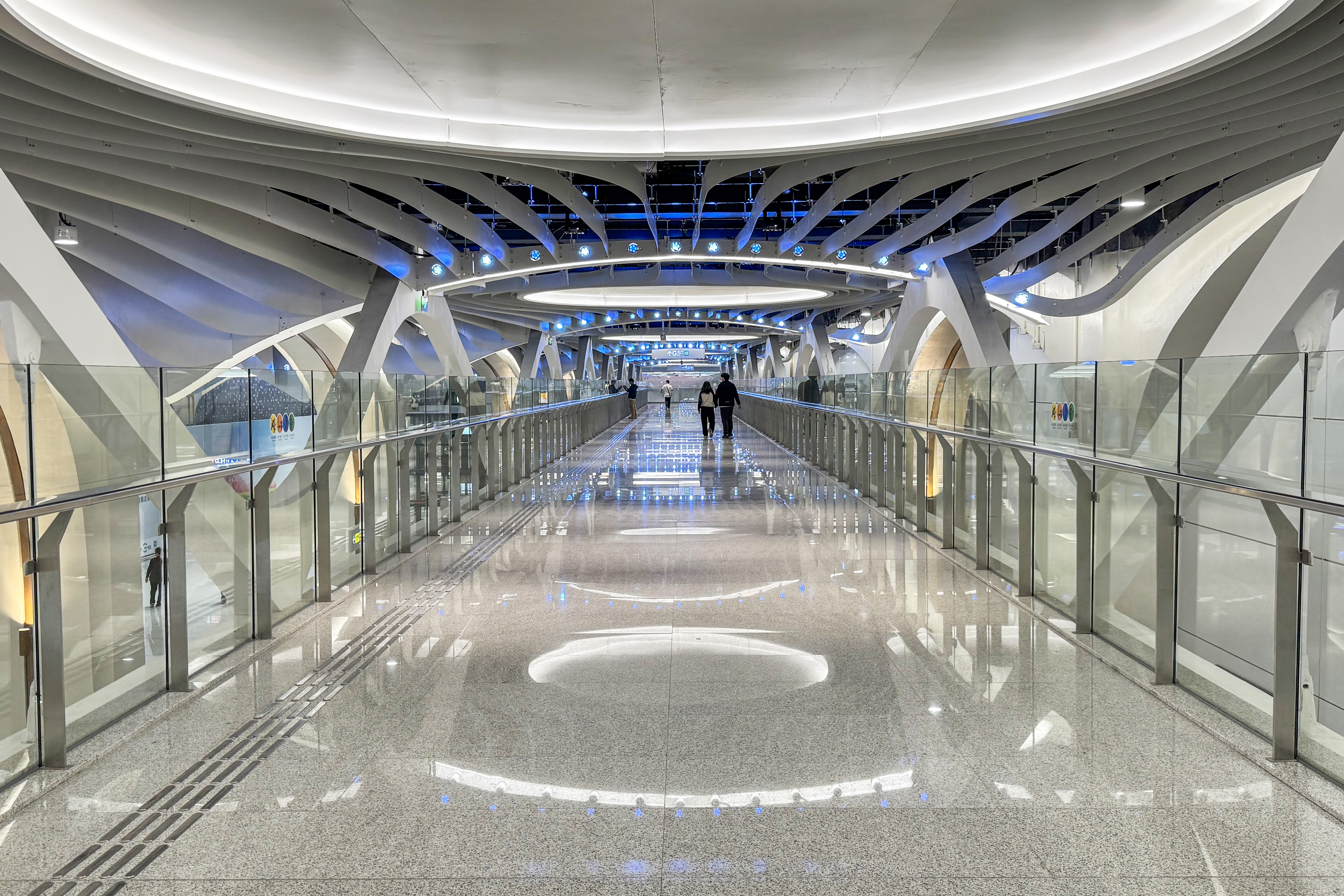
Line 22 unpaid area overhead passage

The station has 9 points of entry/exit, with each line concourse having 3 each. There are two overhead passageways on each side of the Line 22 concourse for pedestrians to cross underground between Exits F and G during operating hours. In addition, the Line 1 south concourse is connected to the Wanxiang underground commercial street, which provides access to Hualei Road, Hongmian Garden, Huadi City and other places.

In 2010, Exit A2 had to be renovated with escalators and the installation of a "flying roof" canopy, so the exit was temporarily closed during the renovation period. In addition, the station used to have Exits C and D at the time of its opening, but now they have been closed due to the construction of Line 22 station and Exit C has been demolished. Exit B2 was also closed due to construction of Line 11 since 9 March 2021 and subsequently demolished. After the Line 11 station opened, three new exits on both sides of Fangcun Avenue were added, which were lettered as C, D and E respectively, of which the new Exit C is located next to Exit A1, and Exit E is newly built at the original place of Exit B2. After the Line 22 station opened, three new exits were added, which were lettered as F, G and H.

==== Line 1 concourse ====
- A1: Fangcun Avenue Middle
- A2: Huadi Avenue North
- B1: Huadi Avenue North, Bai'etan Greater Bay Area Art Center, Guangdong Art Museum, Guangdong Provincial Intangible Cultural Heritage Museum, Guangdong Literature Museum)

==== Line 11 concourse ====
- C: Fangcun Avenue Middle
- D: Fangcun Avenue Middle
- E: Fangcun Avenue Middle

==== Line 22 concourse ====
- F: Huadi Avenue North
- G: Huadi Avenue North
- H: Huadi Avenue North

Exit A1 is equipped with a stairlift and Exits D and G are equipped with elevators.

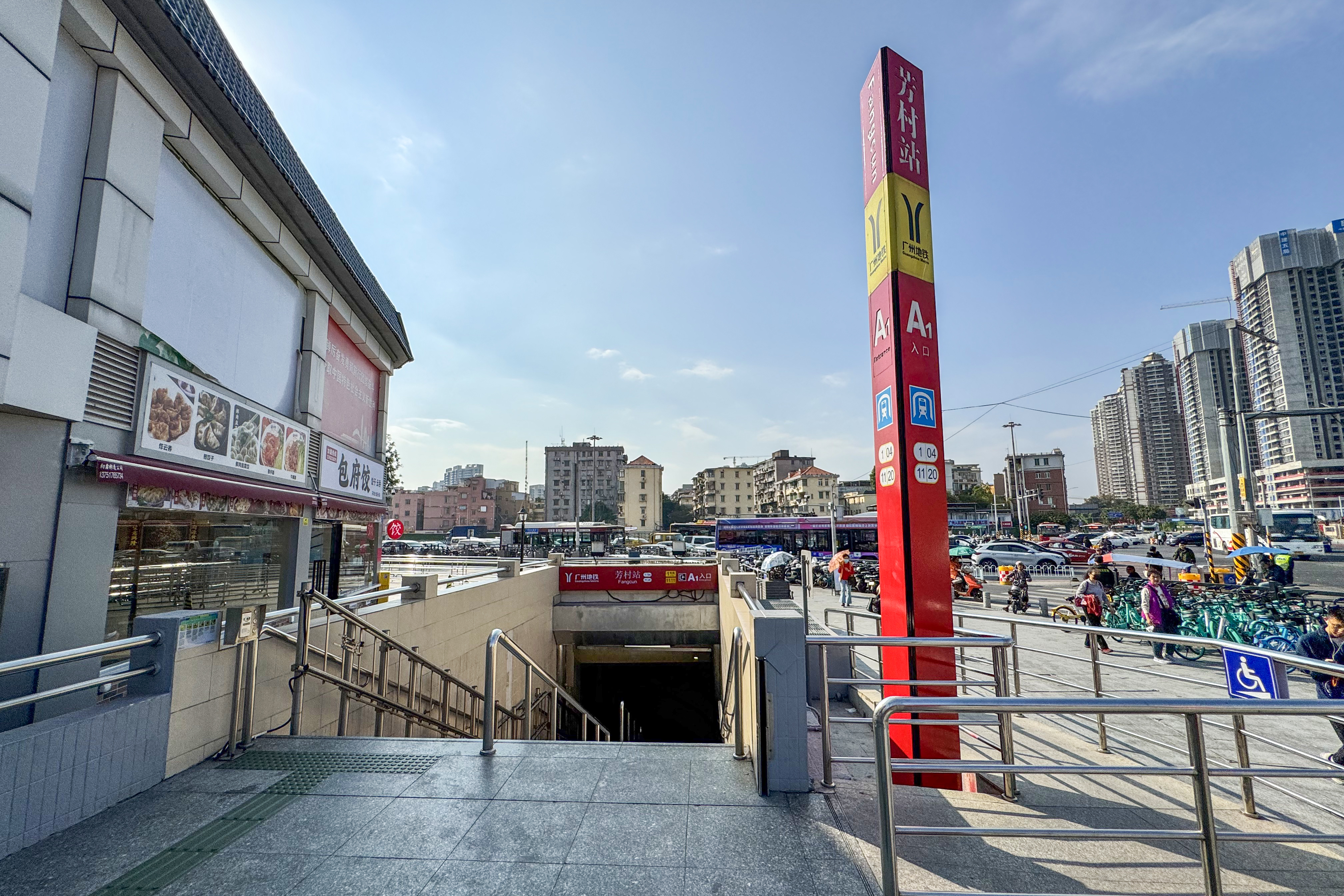
Entrance A1

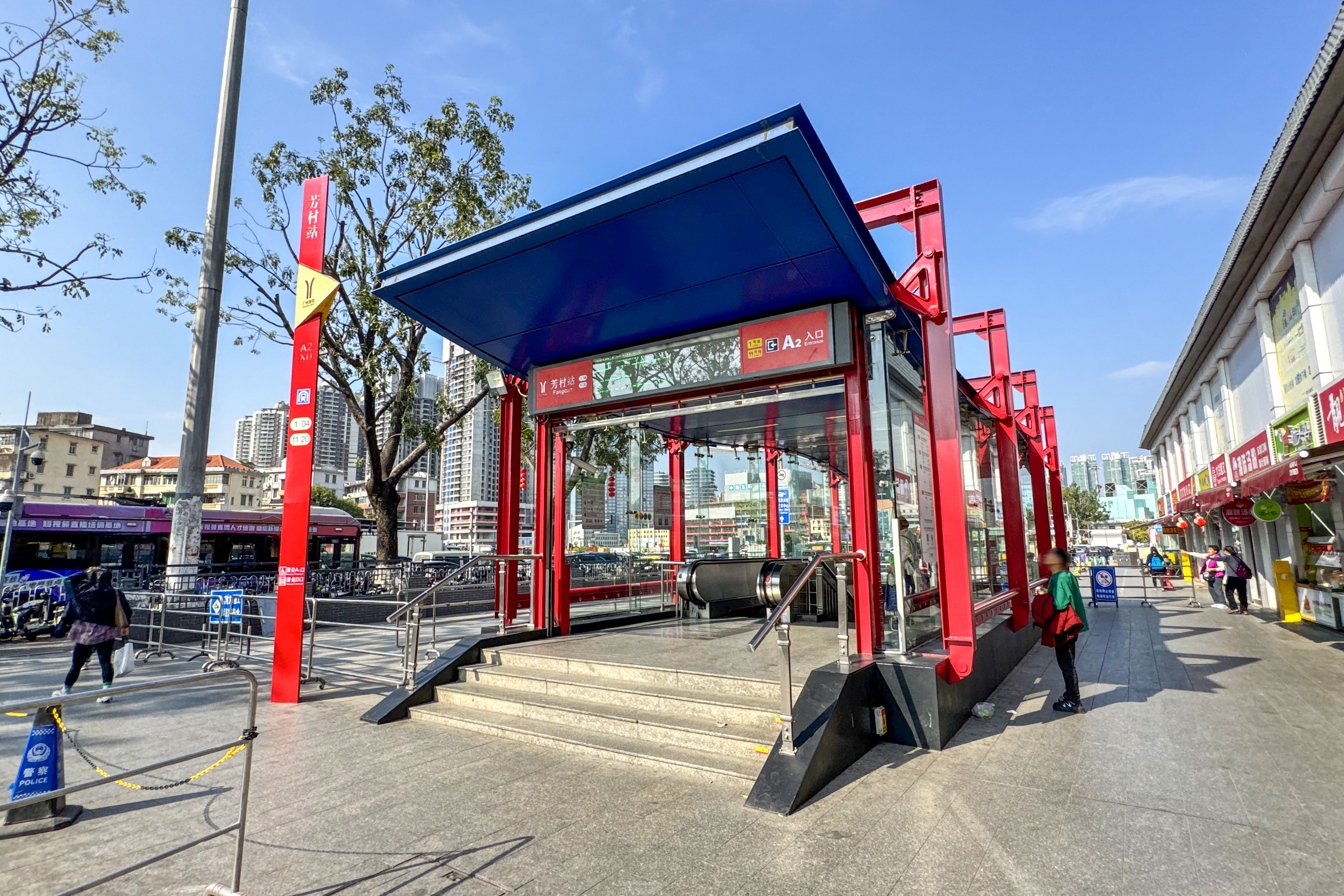
Entrance A2

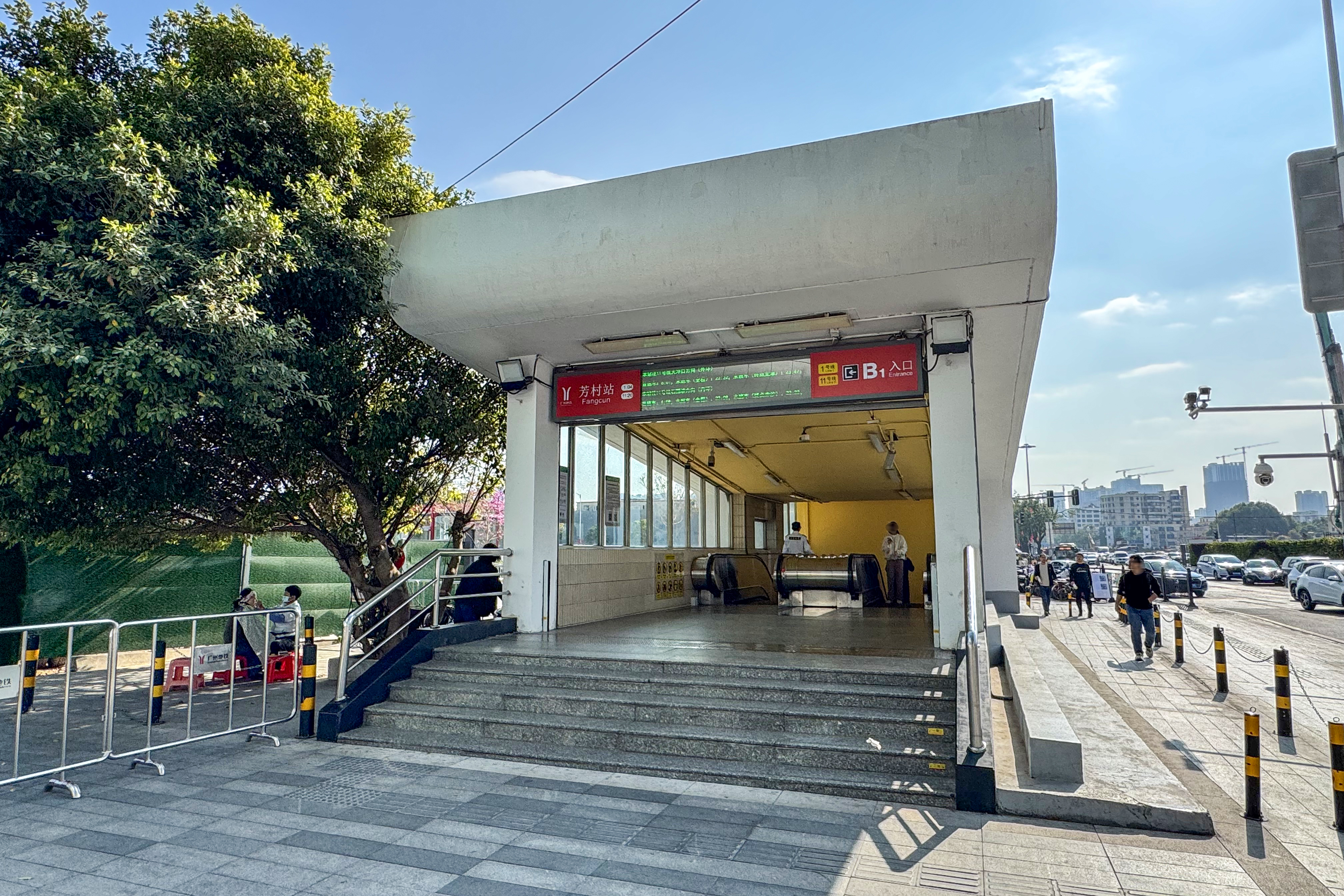
Entrance B1

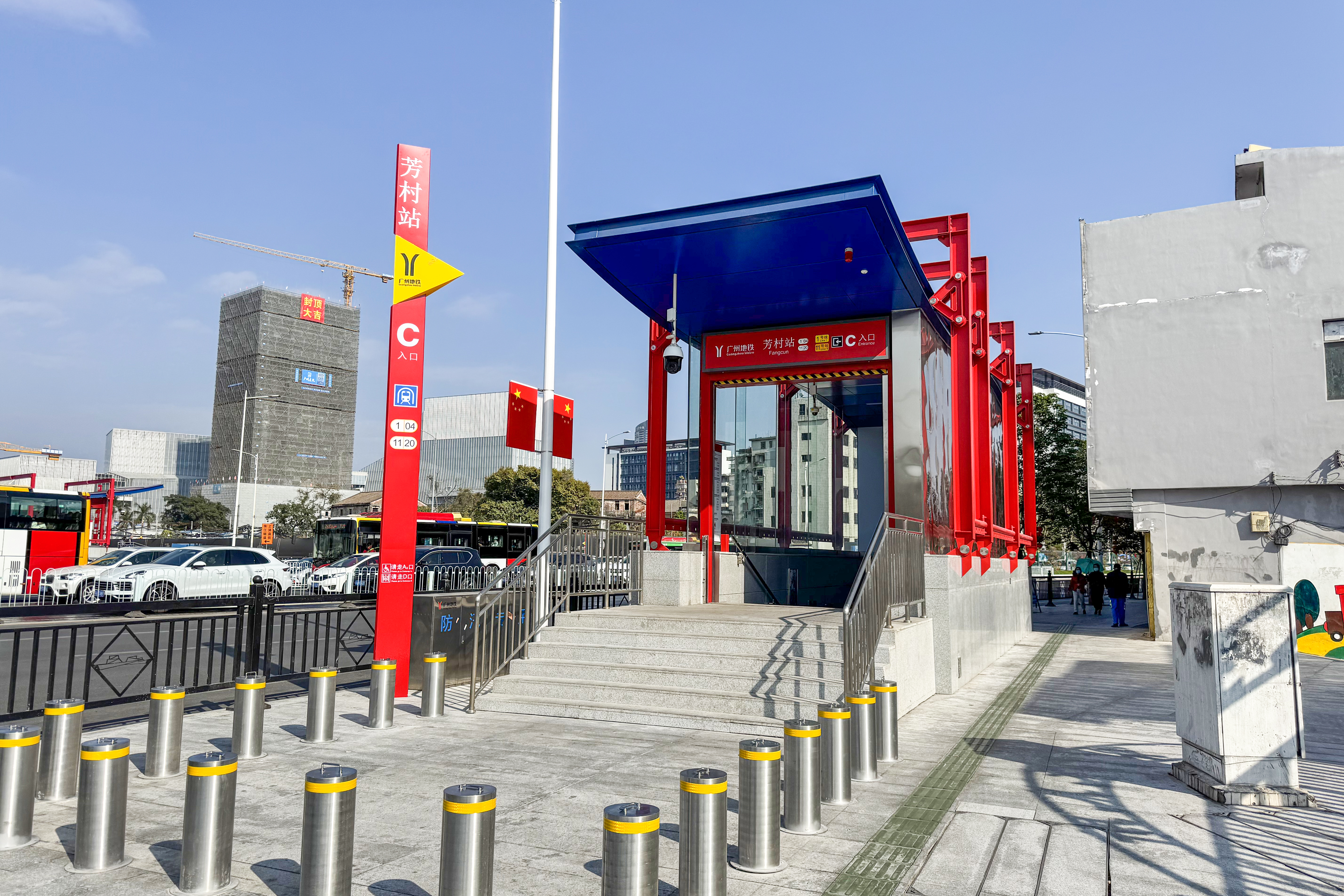
Entrance C

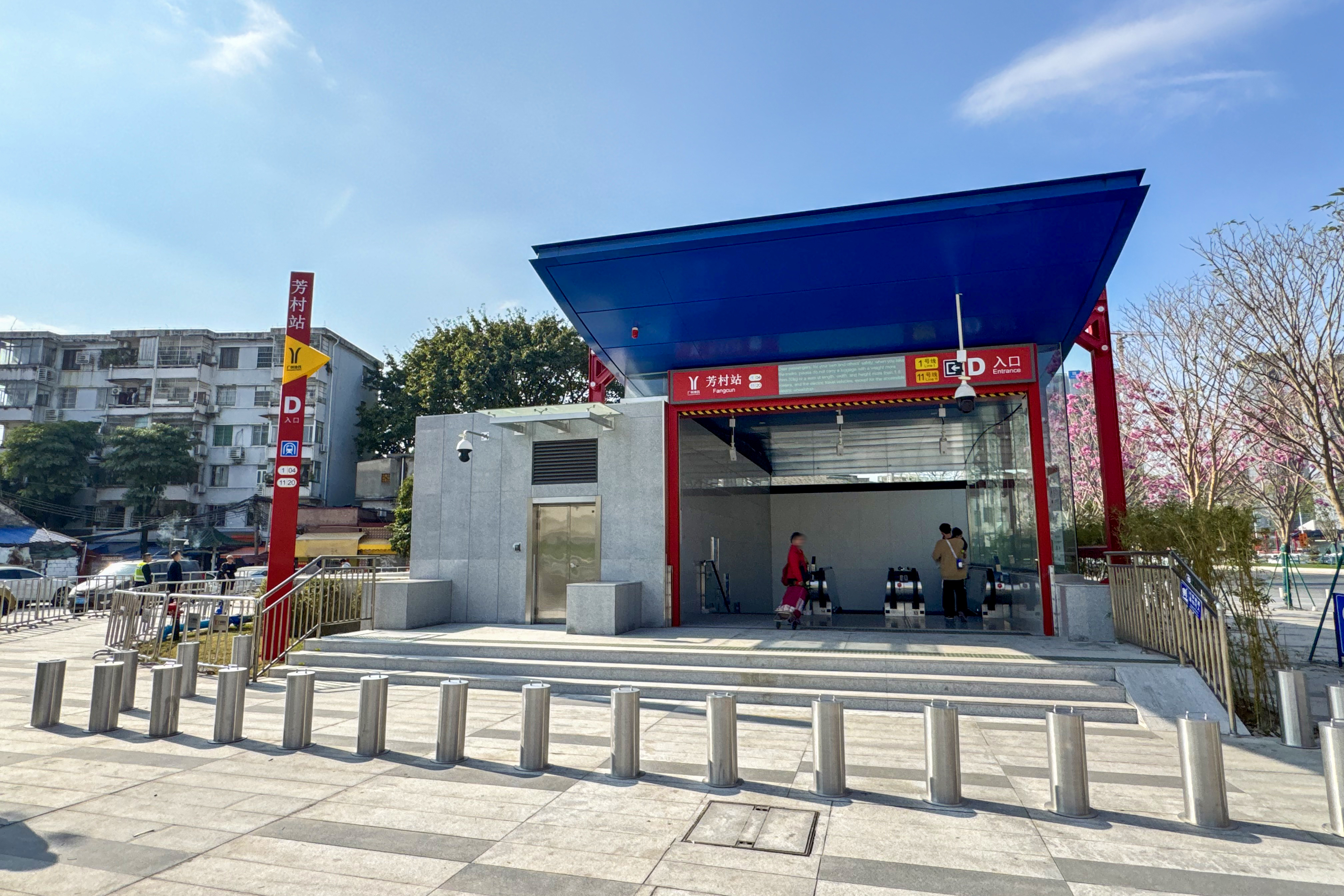
Entrance D

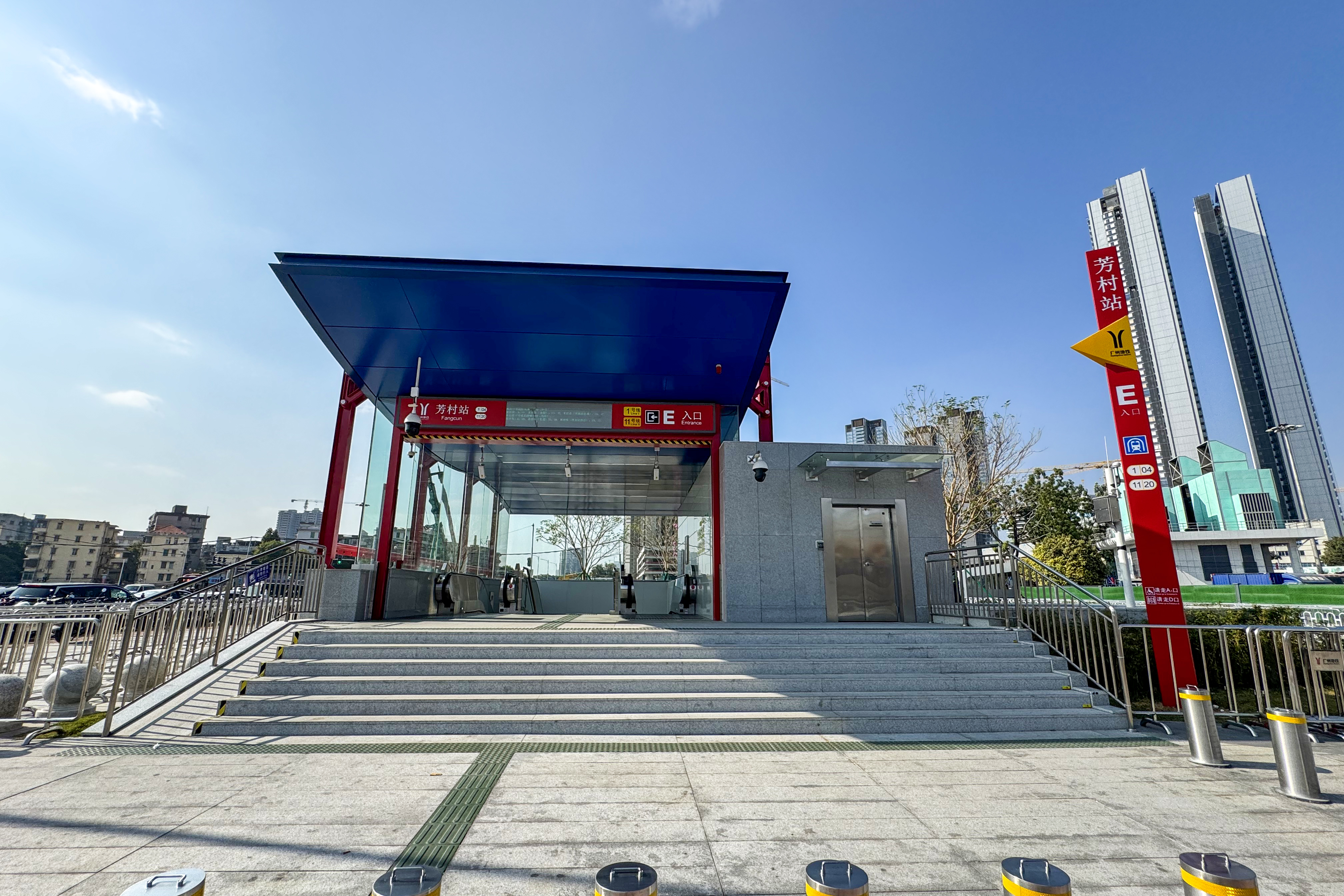
Entrance E

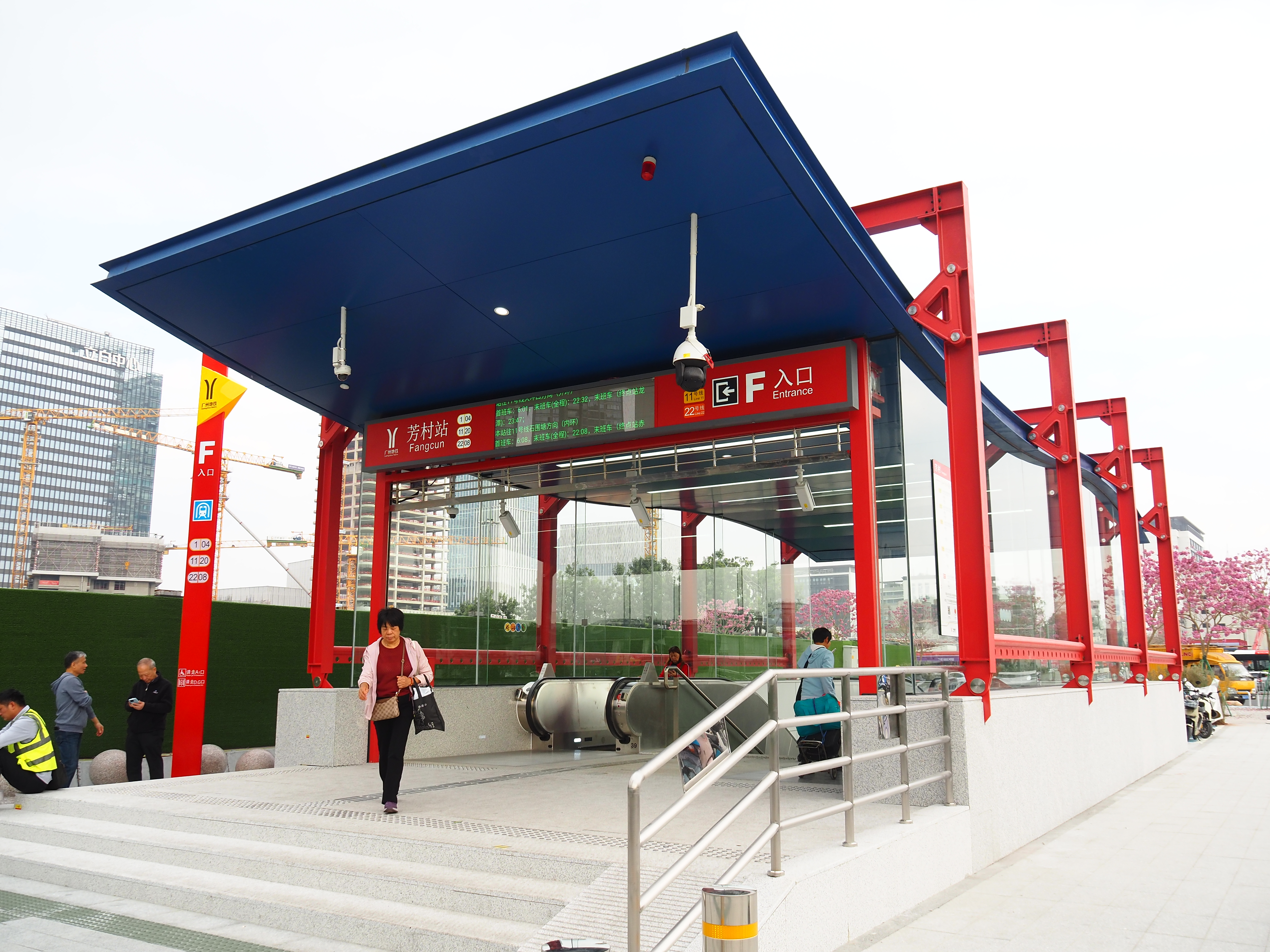
Entrance F

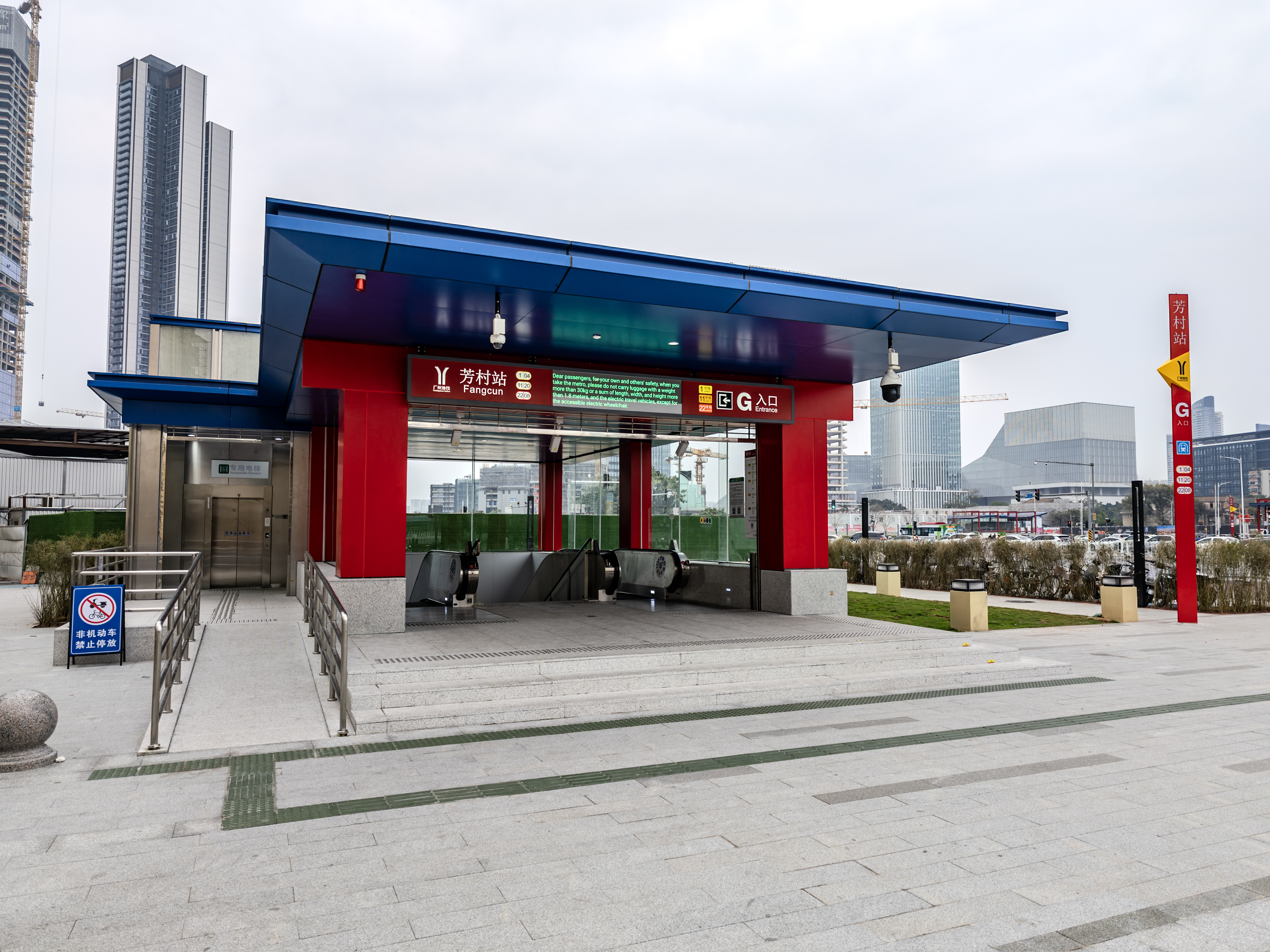
Entrance G

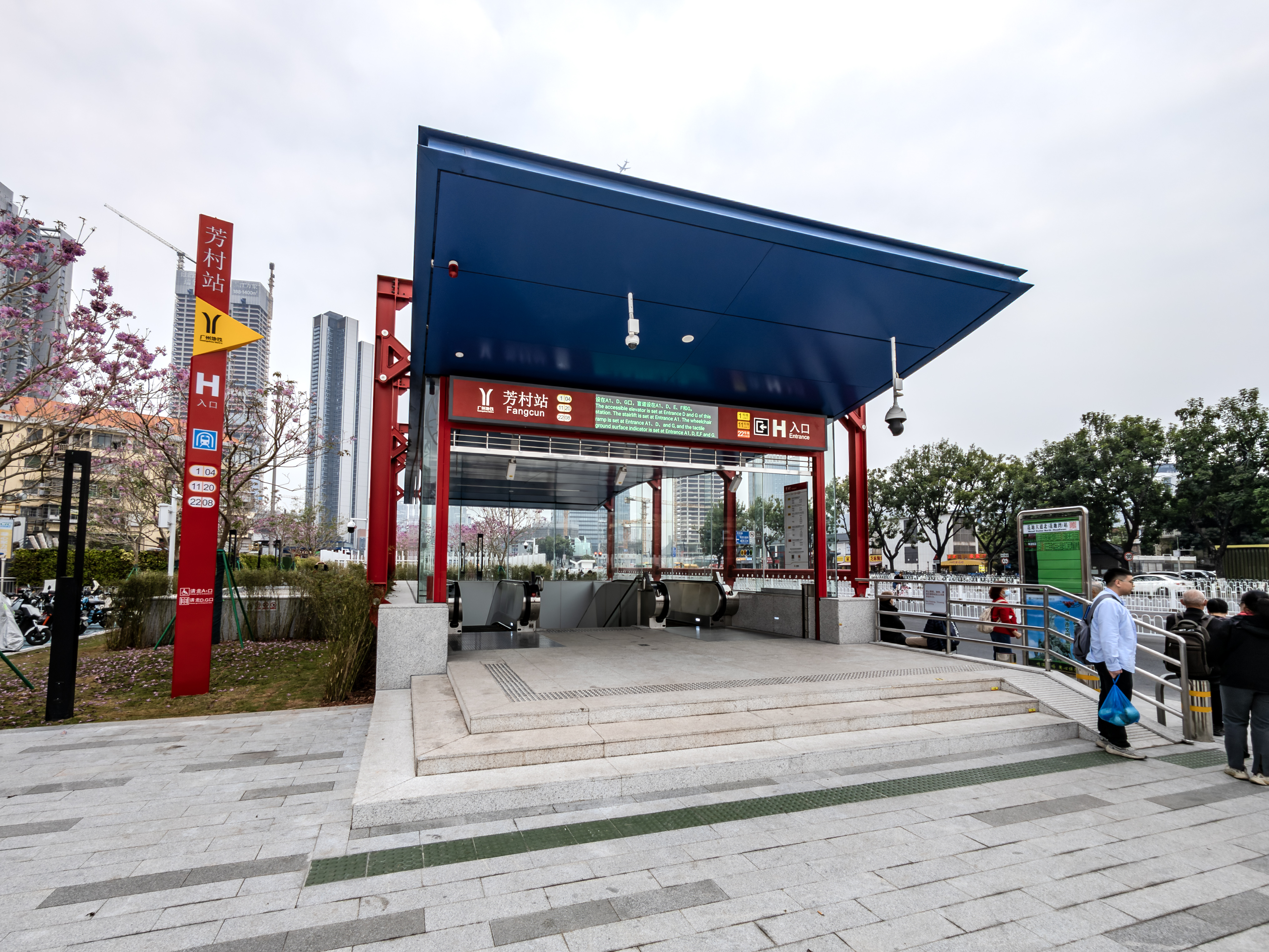
Entrance H

== History ==
=== Line 1 ===
In the 1988 network plan, the station was named Fangcun Huadi, which was the halfway station of Line 1 of the first phase of construction at that time, and is consistent with the current location of the station. On 28 December 1993, Line 1 officially began construction. On 28 June 28 1997, 5 stations from Xilang to Huangsha, including this station, were officially opened with the opening of the first section of Line 1.

In 2004, in consideration of the safety of platform passengers and energy conservation, the metro company decided to install platform screen doors and half-height screen doors on all lines of Line 1 in operation, and to carry out the renovation of platform windways and pipelines. In December 2008, the screen doors at this station were officially put into use, and the station is the last station to install screen doors in the underground section of Line 1.

=== Incidents ===
Before the screen doors of this station were put into use, there were incidents of passengers jumping off the rails and attempting to commit suicide by being hit by incoming trains.

On May 8, 2008, a ceiling of about 10 square meters in the concourse suddenly fell off and smashed to the ground, but fortunately there were no casualties.

==== Station closure due to COVID restrictions ====
During COVID-19 pandemic control rules from 29 May to 24 June 2021, the station's services had been largely restricted, as from 3 June the station only allowed exiting, and from 7 June the station suspended service. It reopened in the afternoon of 24 June.

=== Line 11 ===
The current Line 11 station was originally selected in the 1997 "Guangzhou Urban Rapid Rail Traffic Line Network Planning Study (Final Report)" for Route 5 of Scheme B and the "Super Ring" scheme for the 2008 Rail Transit Network Planning. In 2009, when the initial specification plan was made, it was planned to have a station at Fangcun to intersect with Line 1. In 2012, Line 11 was included in the 12th Five-Year Plan for Rail Transportation in Guangzhou and was approved, and Fangcun Station was also established.

In order to cooperate with the construction of the station of Line 11, from 16 March 2019 till the line opening, the second phase of the construction enclosure was implemented on the section from Huadi Avenue North to Mingxin Road on Fangcun Avenue Middle, in which the pipeline will be relocated, the main structure of the station will be constructed in the enclosed area and some bus lines will be rerouted. The construction of the main structure of the station began on 28 April 2019, the foundation pit was fully excavated on 27 May 2020, the main structure was topped out on 15 November 2020. The "three rights" transfer was completed on 30 July 2024.

In addition, Line 11 was originally planned to have a transfer node with Line 19, as well as part of the structure of Line 19 station on the fourth basement level. However, the reservation plan has been cancelled since the reserved line originally for Line 19 of this station was transferred to Line 28, and since then the current station of Line 28 has been changed to the west of the existing station. At the same time, during construction of Line 11, a transfer node to Lines 22 and 28 has been set up at the western end of the platforms, but it was not implemented due to the high construction risk and the need to pass underneath the Line 1 station body.

On 28 December 2024, Line 11 was opened and put into use, and the station became an interchange station.

=== Line 22 ===
Line 22 originally appeared as the "Bai'etan Connection Express" in the 2010 network plan, and this station served as the terminus of the line until Line 22 and the original Line 18 plan exchanged numbers. The alignment was extended from Guangzhou South Railway Station to Bai'etan before construction was implemented under the name of Line 22.

The Line 22 station site was enclosed on 12 July 2019. In order to cooperate with the project, the original Exit C of the station was closed on 31 August 2020. The main structure of the station laid the base slab in February 2024 and topped out in August of the same year. At the end of October 2025, the Line 22 station completed the "three rights" transfer. On 29 December 2025, the Line 22 station officially opened.

Since the interchange with either Shiweitang Station or Fangcun Station was not confirmed in the early planning of Line 22, it was called Bai'etan station during the planning and construction period, and the station was later determined to be located at the current location. In June 2020, the Guangzhou Metro Group applied to the Geographical Names Committee of the Guangzhou Civil Affairs Bureau for the names of the stations along the stations of Line 18 and Line 22, and the station was unified due to the interchange with Fangcun Station of Line 1, and Fangcun station was used as the official name of the station of Line 22.

== Future development ==
Line 28 (Foshan-Guangzhou-Dongguan Intercity) will have a station on the west side of the Line 22 station, making the station a major hub of the Guangzhou Metro. The station will have 3 underground floors with 3 points of entry/exit, and transfer is available via a newly constructed concourse. In addition, a single crossing line is set up at the western end of the Line 28 platform for trains to turnback when there are intermediate station terminating trains. There is also a connection line to Line 22.

In addition, the Line 22 northern extension (Fangbai Intercity) is under construction, and the station will become an intermediate station when it is opened.
