= Xilang station =

Guangzhou Metro Lines 1, 10, 22 and GF line station

Xilang 西塱
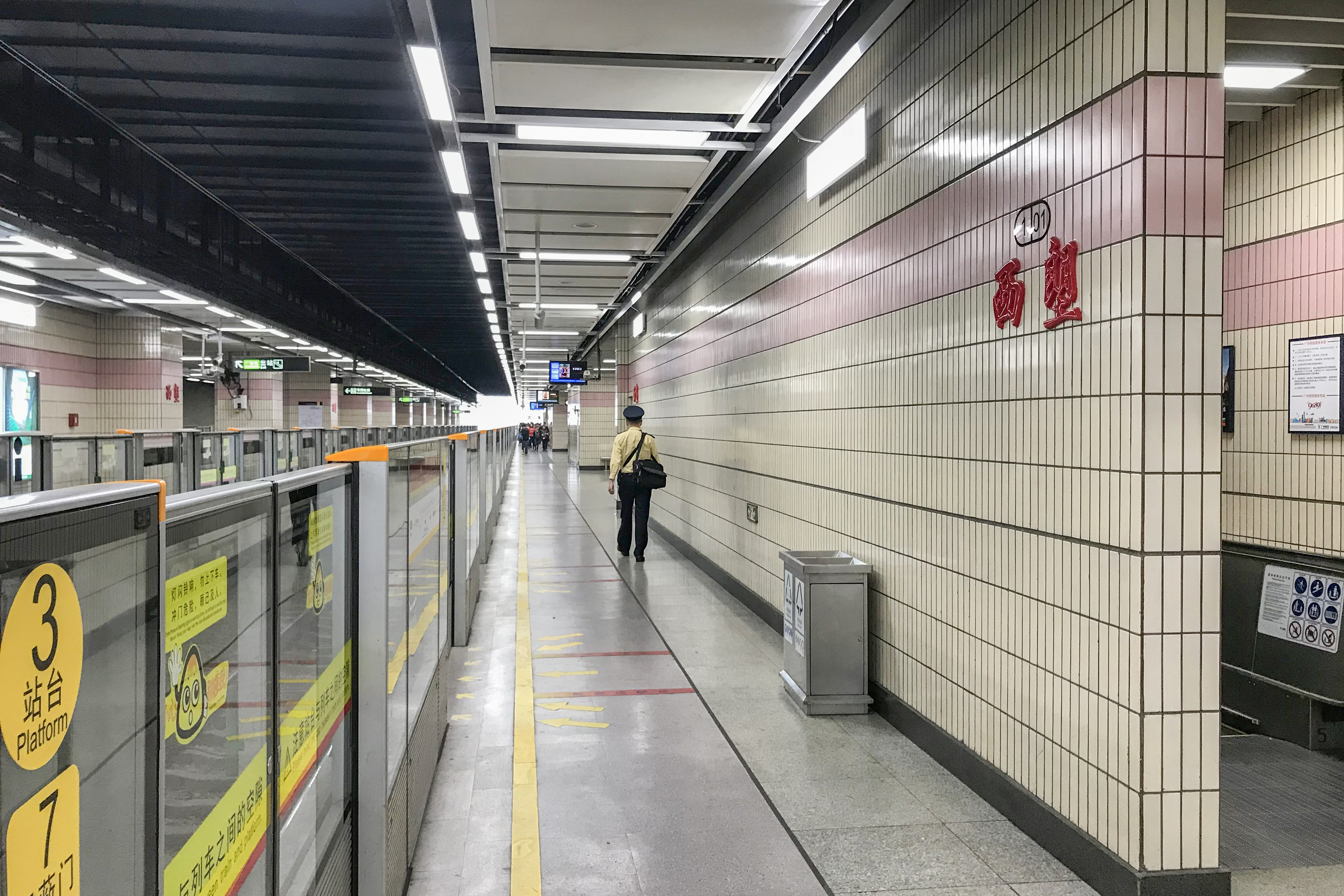
- Platform 3 (Line 1 boarding platform)

Chinese name
- Chinese: 西塱站
Transcriptions
Standard Mandarin
- Hanyu Pinyin: Xīlǎng Zhàn
Yue: Cantonese
- Yale Romanization: Sāilóhng Jaahm
- Jyutping: Sai^{1}long^{5} Zaam^{6}
- Hong Kong Romanization: Sai Long station

General information
- Location: West side of the intersection of Huadi Avenue South (花地大道南) and Hedong Road, southeast of Xilang Depot; Chongkou Subdistrict, Liwan District, Guangzhou, Guangdong; China
- Coordinates: 23°4′17″N 113°13′43″E
- Operator: Guangzhou Metro Co. Ltd. Foshan Railway Investment Construction Group Co. Ltd. Guangdong Intercity Railway Operation Co., Ltd. (Line 22)
- Lines: Line 1; Line 10; Line 22; Guangfo line
- Platforms: 11 (4 island platforms and 3 side platforms)
- Tracks: 9

Construction
- Structure type: At-grade (Guangzhou Line 1); Underground (Guangfo Line/Foshan Line 1, Guangzhou Line 10, Guangzhou Line 22)
- Accessible: Yes

Other information
- Station code: 101 1001 2207 GF18

History
- Opened: Line 1: 28 June 1997 (29 years ago); Line 10: 29 June 2025 (15 months ago); Line 22: 29 December 2025 (9 months ago); Guangfo line: 3 November 2010 (15 years ago)

Services
Preceding station	Guangzhou Metro	Following station
Terminus	Line 1	Kengkou towards Guangzhou East Railway Station
Terminus	Line 10	Huawei towards Yangji East
Fangcun Terminus	Line 22	Nanjiao towards Panyu Square
Jushu towards Xincheng Dong	Guangfo line	Hedong towards Lijiao
Location

Xilang station (Chinese: 西塱站 (Note: Its Chinese name was 西朗站 before September 2018, due to lack of Unicode CJK Unified Ideographs support in early ticket system and signal system, where the 塱 is coded U+5871 in the block); Jyutping: sai^{1}long^{5} zaam^{6}; Cantonese Yale: Sāilóhng Jaahm), formerly Guanggang station because of nearby Guangzhou Iron and Steel's headquarters when planning, is an interchange station between Line 1, Line 10, Line 22 and the Guangfo line of the Guangzhou Metro. It is the southern terminus of Line 1 and the western terminus of Line 10. It started operations on 28 June 1997. It is situated under Huadi Avenue South in Fangcun, Liwan District. The Guangfo line station started operations on 3 November 2010, the Line 10 station started operations on 29 June 2025 and the Line 22 station started operations on 29 December 2025, and Xilang became a four-line interchange station.

The station was the eastern terminus of Guangfo line before the extension to Yangang opened on 28 December 2015.

During COVID-19 pandemic control rules from 29 May to 24 June 2021, services of Xilang station had been largely restricted, as all entrances and exits are closed, passengers can't embark or disembark at this station, and while the trains on both lines can still stop here, passengers can only transfer between both lines within the fare zone. All entrances have been reopened in the afternoon of 24 June.

The now opened remaining section of Phase 1 of Line 22 has served the station since 29 December 2025, becoming the first four-line interchange station completely within Guangzhou Metro. North of the station, Line 1 is connected to Xilang Depot and south of the station, Line 10 is connected to Guanggang New Town Depot.

== Station layout ==
The station consists of three sections, the Line 1 station on ground level, and the underground Line 10 and Guangfo line stations. The station as a whole is roughly in an inverted "L" shape, of which the station of Line 1 and the station of Line 10 are roughly parallel, and the three lines are connected by a paid area transfer passage. The station is surrounded by Huadi Avenue South, Xilang Depot, Xilang-Fangcun Bus Terminus and other nearby buildings.

Toilets and nursery rooms are located in the paid area of the Line 10 concourse and the southern end of the Line 22 platforms towards Nanjiao.

=== Line 1 ===
The Line 1 station is a three-storey station, the ground level are the platforms, the second floor is the concourse, and the third floor are offices.

In addition, the third floor of the station building was reserved for the use of the Guangfo Tram planned at the time, and the planned Guangfo line decided to build its concourse and platforms underground, therefore the pre-reserved structure of the above-ground third floor was converted into offices.

F3		Offices
F2	West Transfer Building Upper Level	Towards Line 22 (U/C)
F2	Concourse	Ticket Machines, Customer Service, Shops, Police Station, Security Facilities
F2	East Transfer Building Upper Level	Towards Lines 10 22 and Guangfo line
G Line 1 Platforms		1 termination platform (back to Xilang Depot)
G Line 1 Platforms	Platform 5 Platform 4	Island platform, alighting passengers only
G Line 1 Platforms		1 towards Guangzhou East Railway Station (Kengkou)
G Line 1 Platforms	Platform 3 Platform 2	Island platform, boarding passengers only
G Line 1 Platforms		1 towards Guangzhou East Railway Station (Kengkou)
G Line 1 Platforms	Platform 1	Side platform, alighting passengers only
G Line 1 Platforms		Exits A and B

=== Line 10 ===
The Line 10 station is a four-storey underground station. The ground level is the exit and the transfer mezzanine towards Line 1, the first floor is the transfer level, the second floor is the concourse, the third floor is the equipment level, and the fourth floor are the platforms for Line 10.

This station is a cultural themed station on Line 10, and the theme is "Harmonious Life".

G	East Transfer Building Mezzanine	Towards Lines 1 and 10; Exits C and E
L1	Entrance/exit Mezzanine	Towards Line 10 and Exits C and E, Security Facilities
L1	Transfer concourse	Towards Lines 1 10 and Guangfo line
L2; Concourse	10 Lobby	Ticket Machines, Customer Service, Shops, Security Facilities, Toilets, Nursery; Transfer passageways to Line 22
L3	Mezzanine	Station Equipment
L4; Platforms	Side platform, doors will open on the right for alighting passengers only
L4; Platforms	Platform 9	10 termination Platform
L4; Platforms	Platform 8	10 towards Yangji East (Huawei)
L4; Platforms	Side platform, doors will open on the right for boarding passengers only

=== Line 22 ===
The Line 22 station is a four-storey underground station. The ground level is the exit, the second floor is the concourse and the transfer mezzanine towards Line 1, Line 10 and Guangfo line, the third floor is the equipment level, and the fourth floor are the platforms for Line 22.

During construction of the Line 22 station, a two island-one side station was simultaneously built on the first floor for the future underground conversion of Line 1. The second floor and the third floors reserve conditions for access to future new buildings.

The Line 22 station has the theme of "Window of Guangfo at the Intersection of Two Cities", which highlights the visual guidance space through orange and white colors at the transfer interface with the color scheme of other lines.

G	West Transfer Building Mezzanine	Towards Lines 1 and 22 (U/C); Exits K and L
L1; 1 Platforms (U/C)		1 reserved track
L1; 1 Platforms (U/C)	Island platform, alighting passengers only
L1; 1 Platforms (U/C)		1 reserved track
L1; 1 Platforms (U/C)	Island platform, boarding passengers only
L1; 1 Platforms (U/C)		1 reserved track
L1; 1 Platforms (U/C)	Side platform, alighting passengers only
L2; Concourse	Transfer passage	Towards Line 1 10 and Guangfo line
L2; Concourse	22 Lobby	Ticket Machines, Customer Service, Shops, Security Screening Facilities
L3	Mezzanine	Station Equipment
L4; 22 Platforms	Platform 10	22 towards Fangcun (terminus)
L4; 22 Platforms	Island platform, doors will open on the left (Toilets, Nursery)
L4; 22 Platforms	Platform 11	22 towards Panyu Square (Nanjiao)

=== Guangfo line ===
The Guangfo line station is a two-storey underground station. The first floor is the concourse and exit passageways, and the second floor is the platform for Guangfo line.

L1; Concourse	Guangfo Lobby	Ticket Machines, Customer Service, Shops, Security Facilities, Exits D, F, G Via transfer concourse towards Lines 1 10 and 22
L2; Platforms	Platform 7	Guangfo towards Xincheng Dong (Jushu)
L2; Platforms	Island platform, doors will open on the left
L2; Platforms	Platform 6	Guangfo towards Lijiao (Hedong)

=== Concourse ===
The concourse is divided into four parts: Line 1, Line 10, Line 22 and Guangfo line. The Line 1 concourse is on the second above-ground floor, the Line 10 and Line 22 concourses are on the second underground floor, and the Guangfo line concourse is on the first underground floor. There are elevators, escalators and stairs in the fare-paid areas of the lines for passengers to access the platforms.

The station also has various convenience stores and shops, including a 7-Eleven on the Guangfo line concourse. The concourses also have self-service facilities including automatic vending machines, automatic camera booths and charging stations.

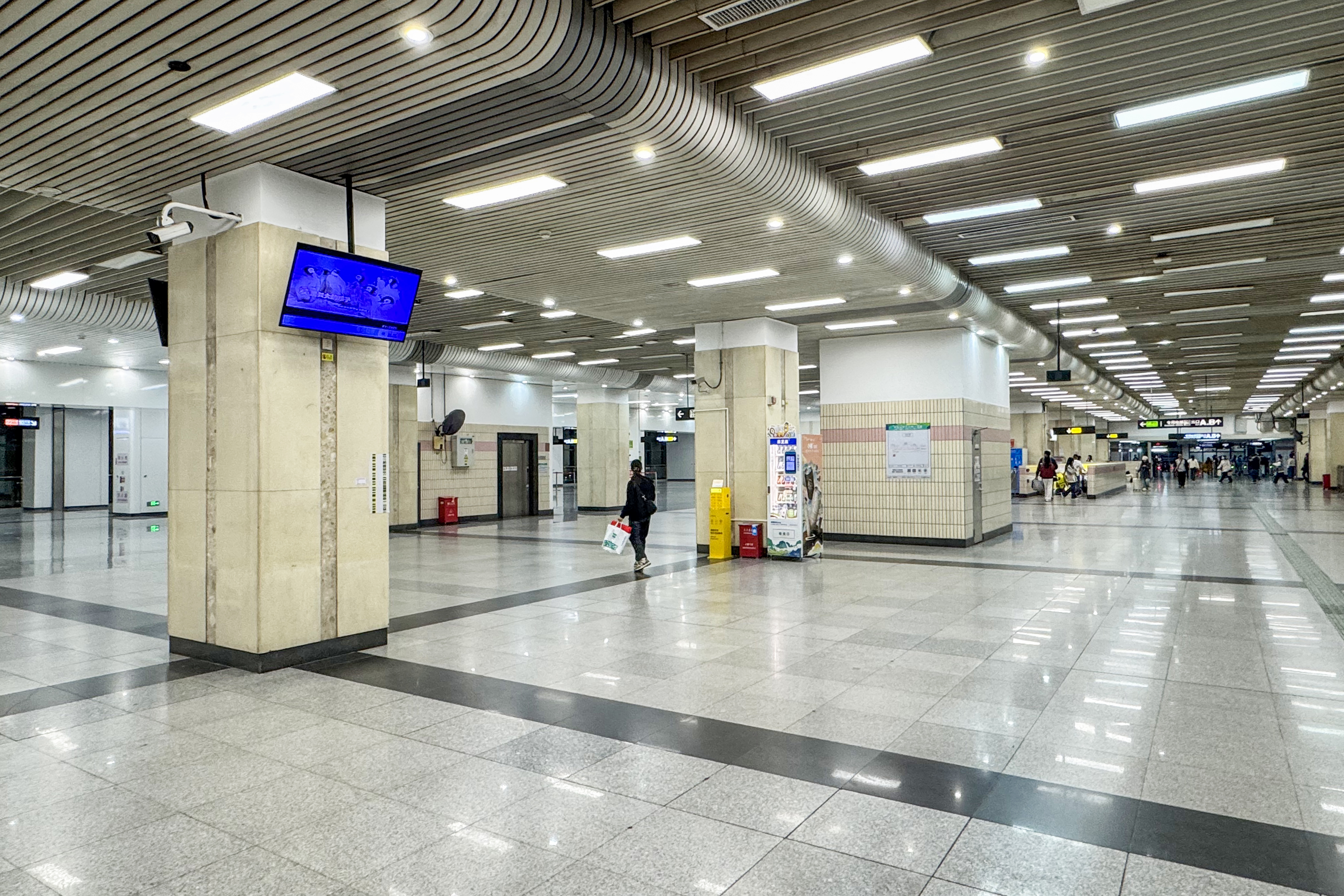
Line 1 concourse

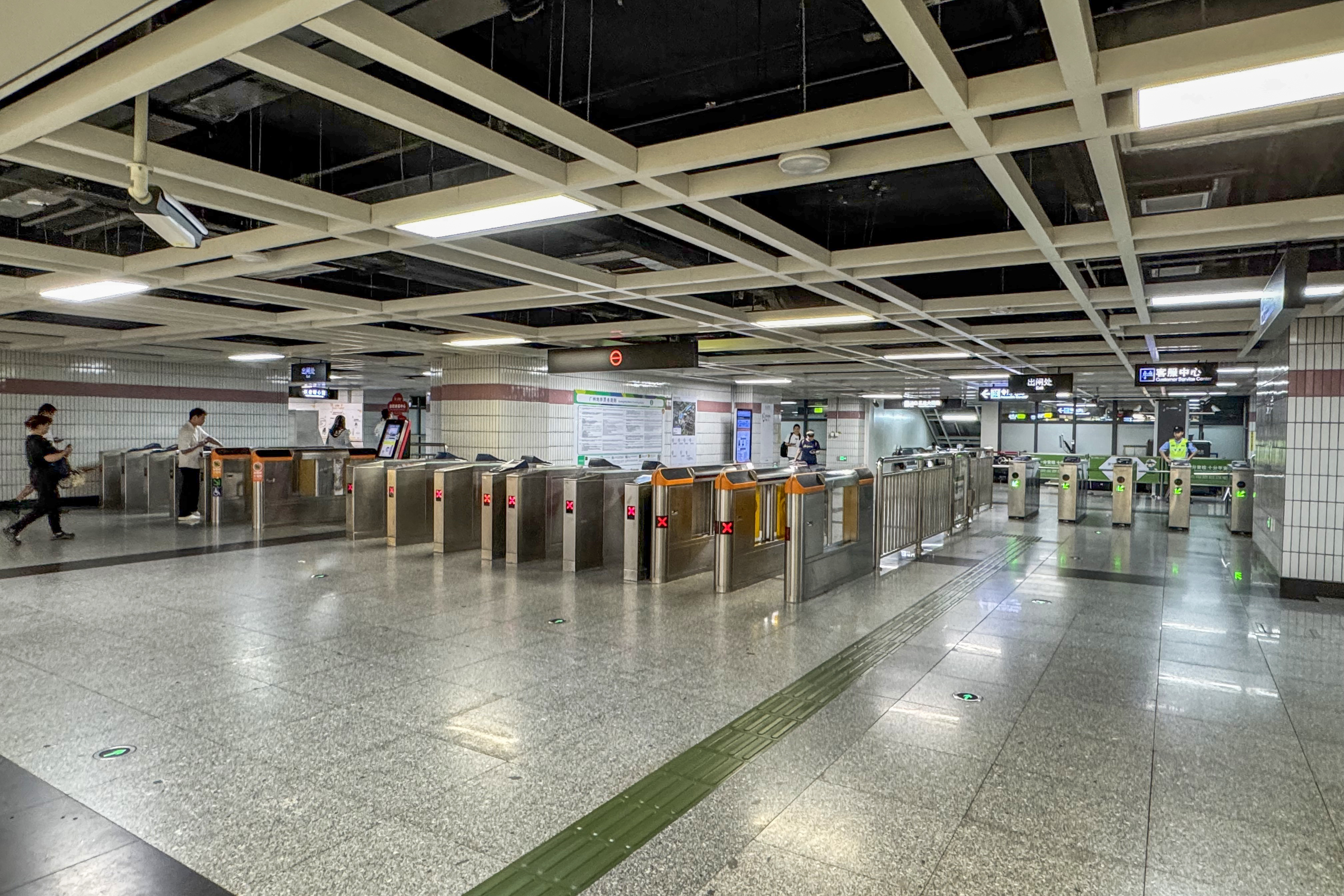
Line 1 concourse south portion

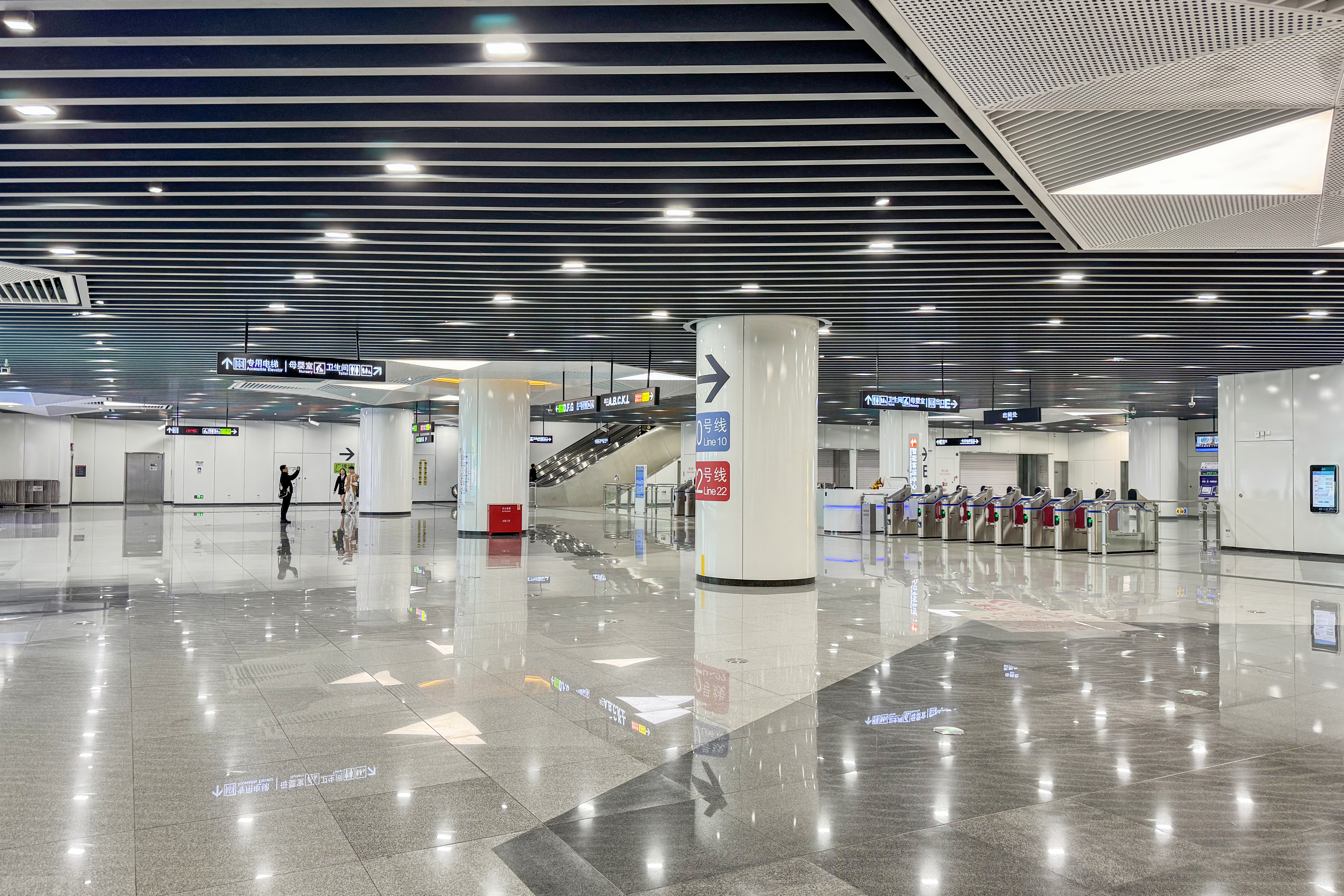
Line 10 concourse north portion

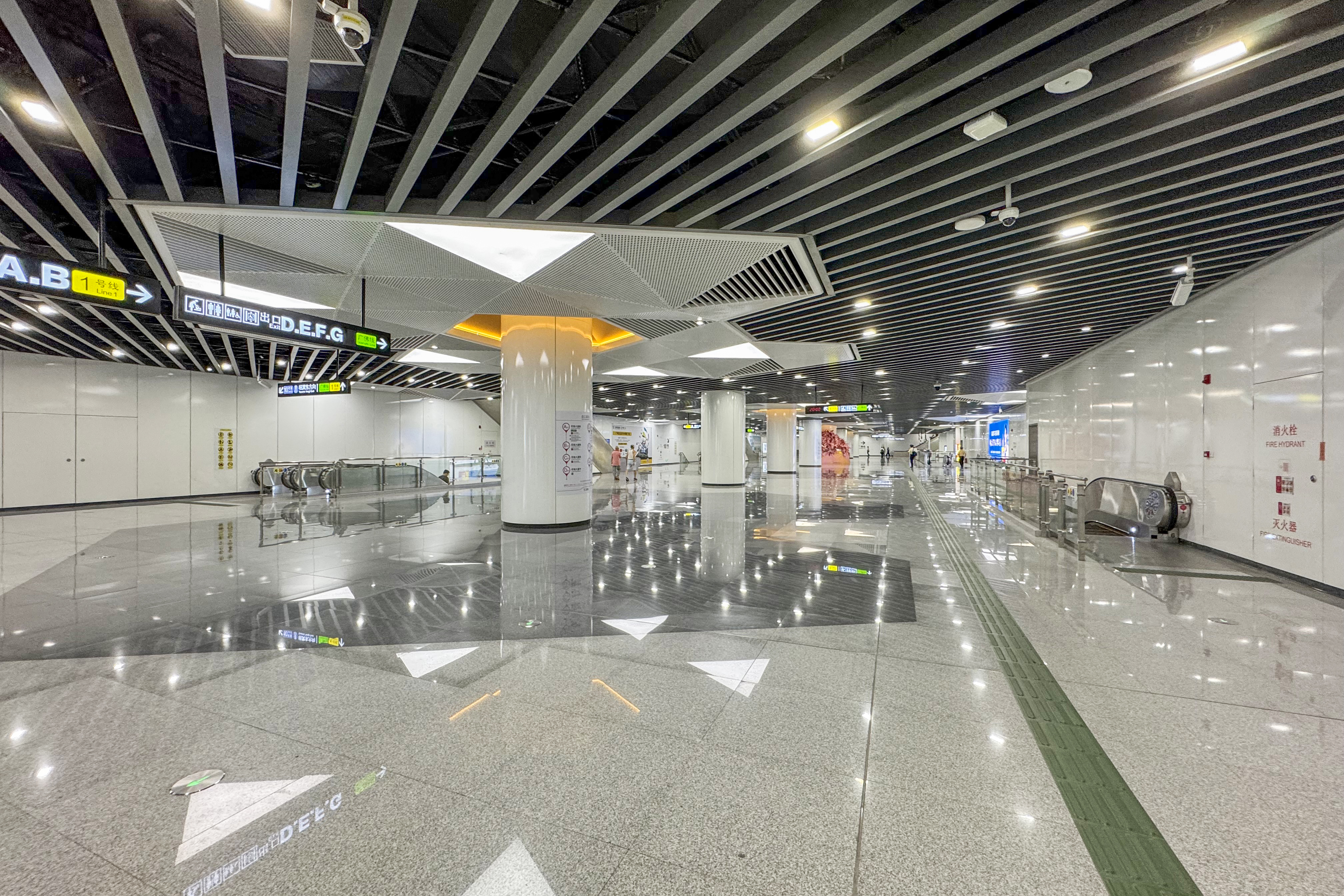
Line 10 concourse middle portion

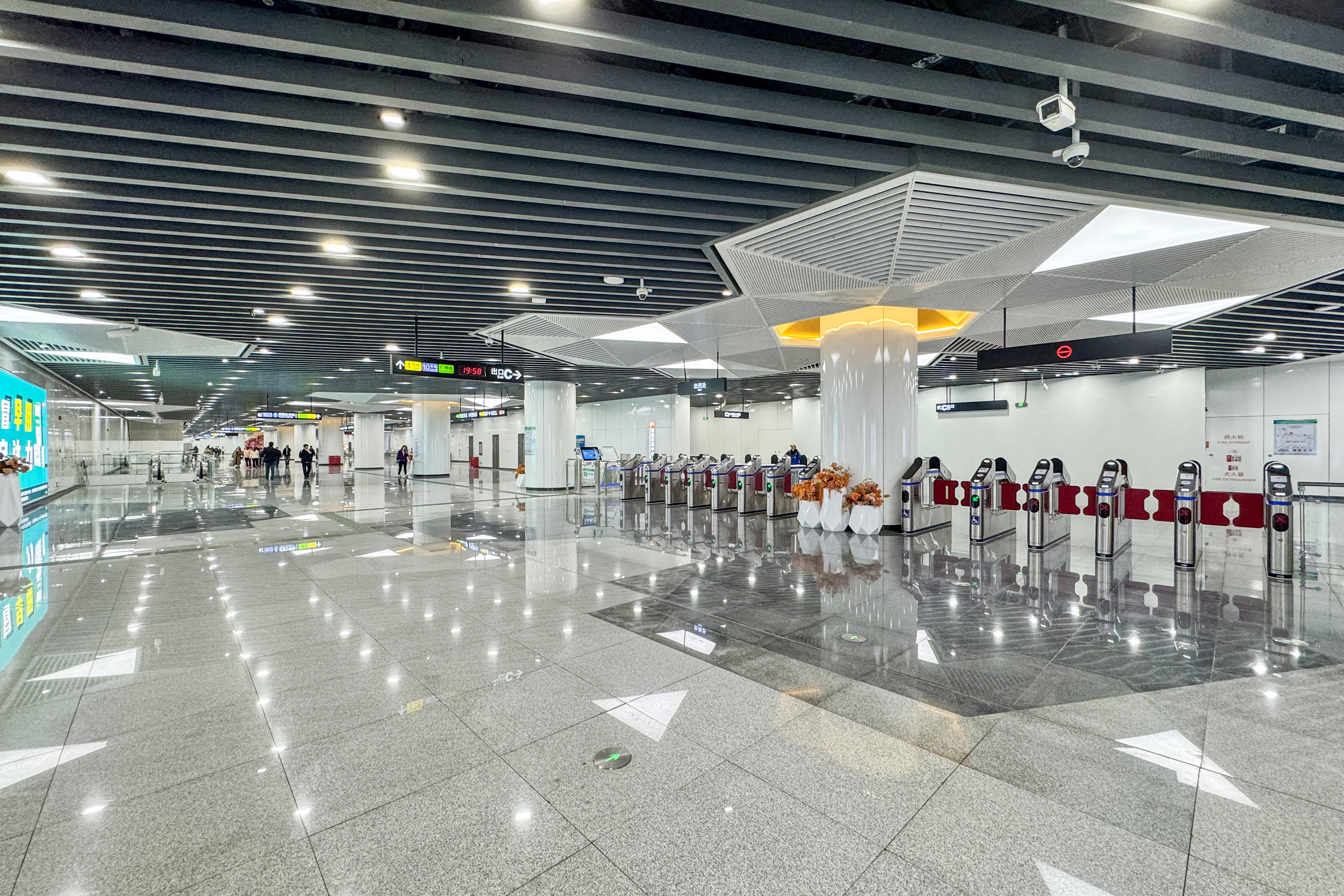
Line 10 concourse south portion

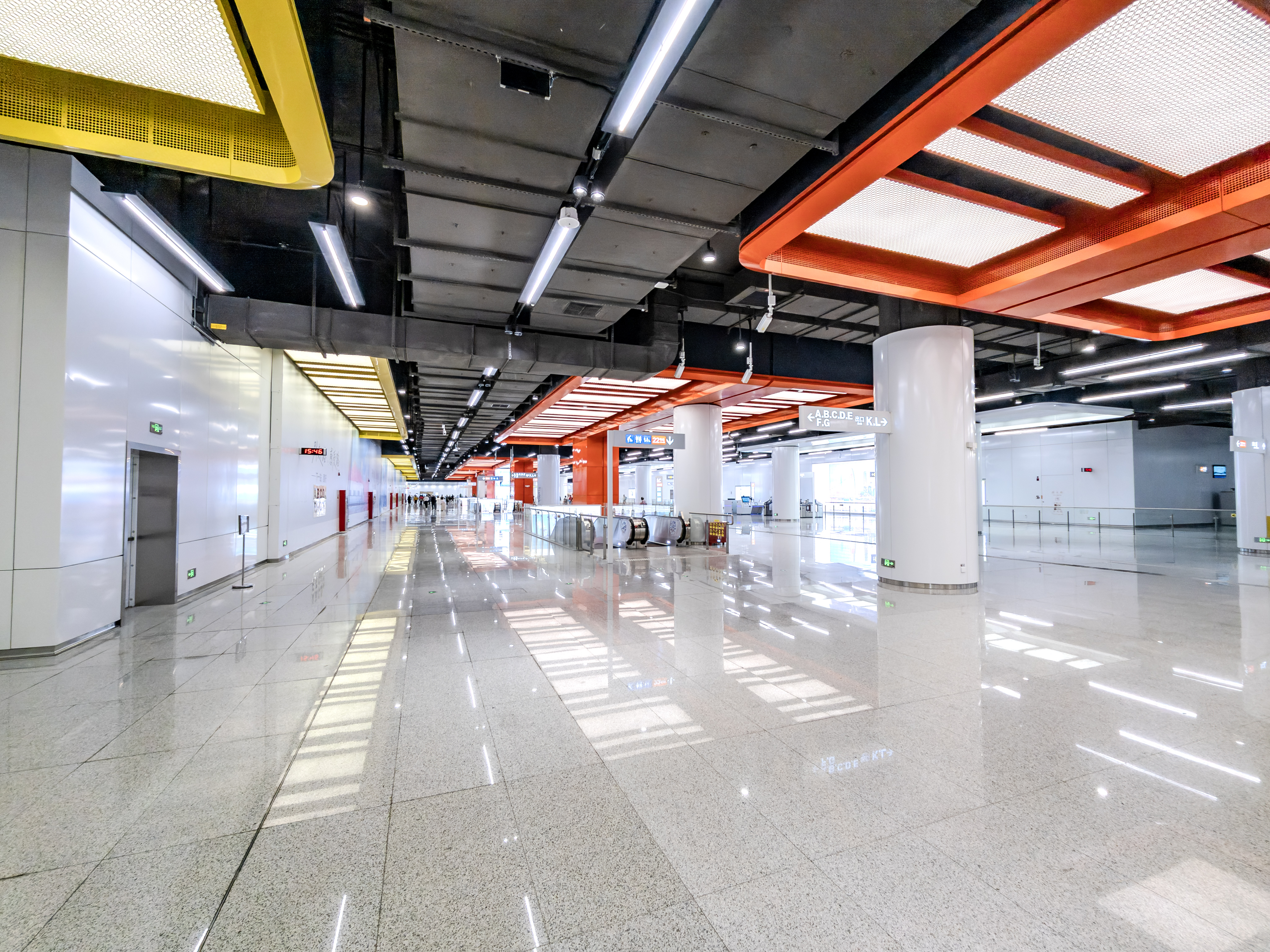
Line 22 concourse

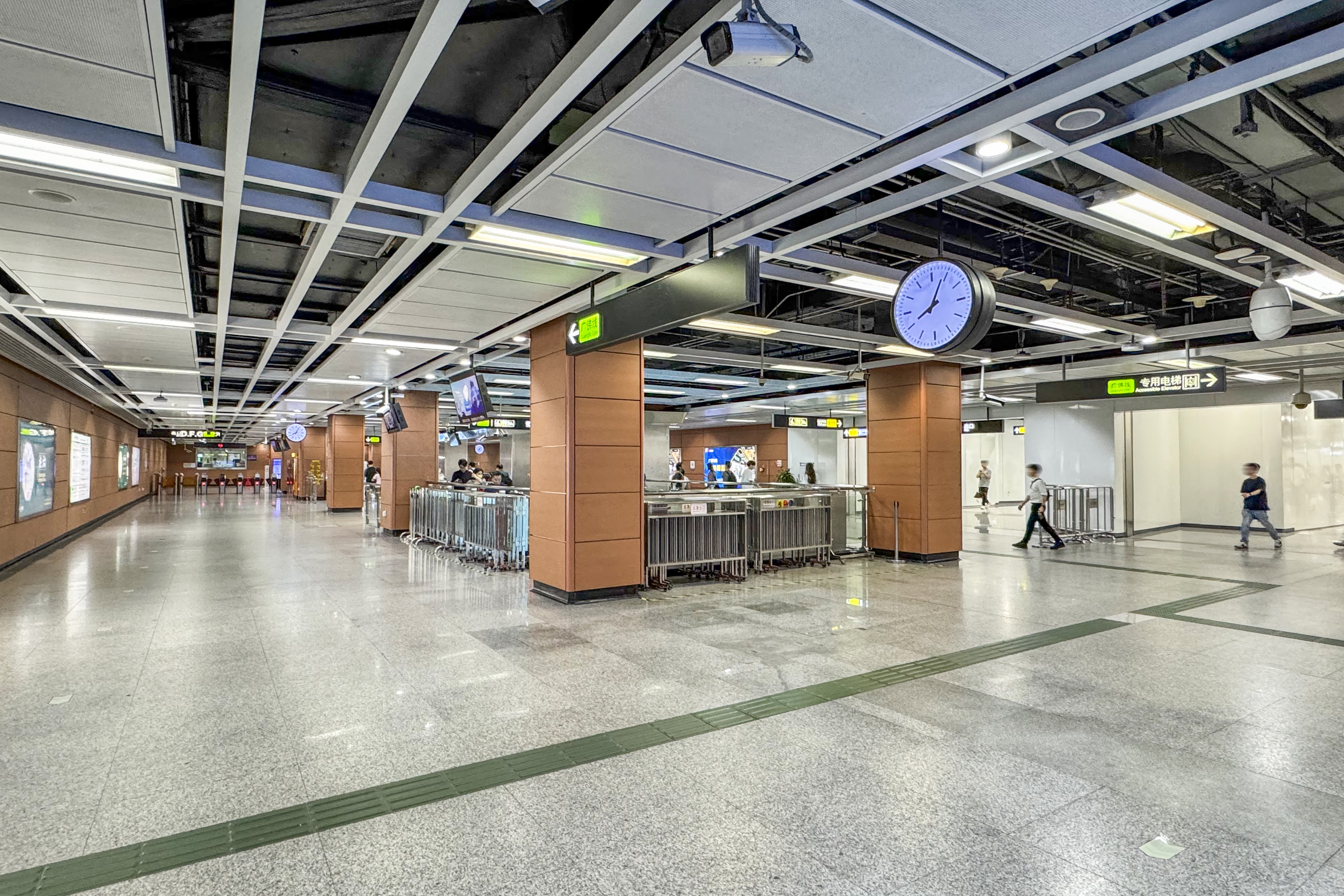
Guangfo line concourse

=== Transfer methods ===
At present, the transfer between the four lines is carried out through the transfer building built by Line 10 and the transfer concourse on the first floor, and the transfer between Line 1 and Lines 10 and 22 is carried out through the escalator connecting the ground transfer mezzanine of the transfer building to the Line 10 concourse on the second underground floor. As for the three lines transferring with the Guangfo line, they use the transfer concourse on the first floor, which connects to the south side of the Guangfo line concourse, and there are also escalators connecting the Line 1 and Line 10 concourses. In addition, passengers can also transfer between the four lines through a dedicated elevator connecting all four floors.

In addition, Line 22 also has a transfer building that is situated between Line 1 and Line 22, but construction progress of this building is lagging behind, so Line 22 will temporarily transfer to/from Line 10 and the other lines through the transfer passage toward the south of the second floor.

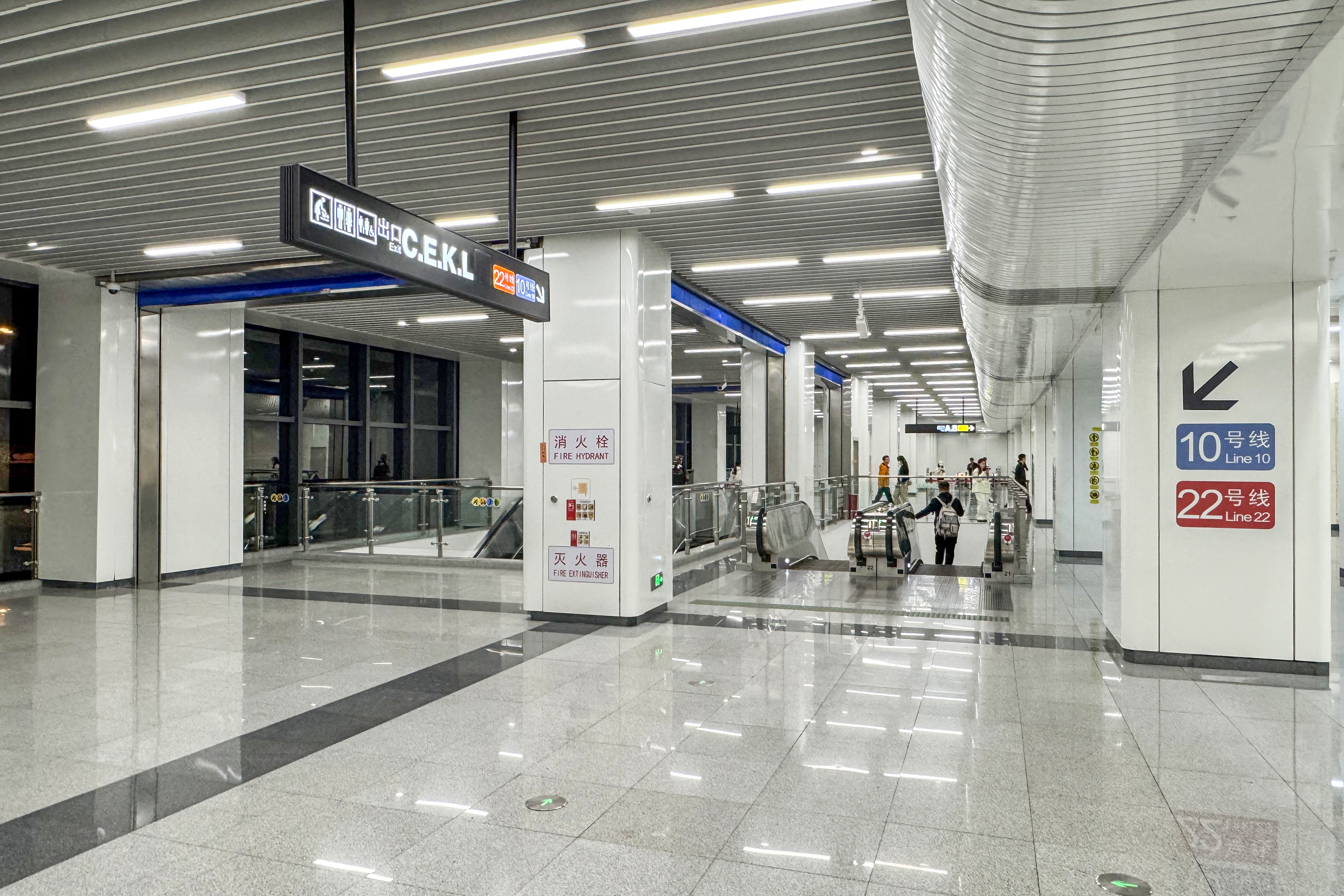
Escalator at the Line 1 eastern transfer building towards Lines 10 and 22

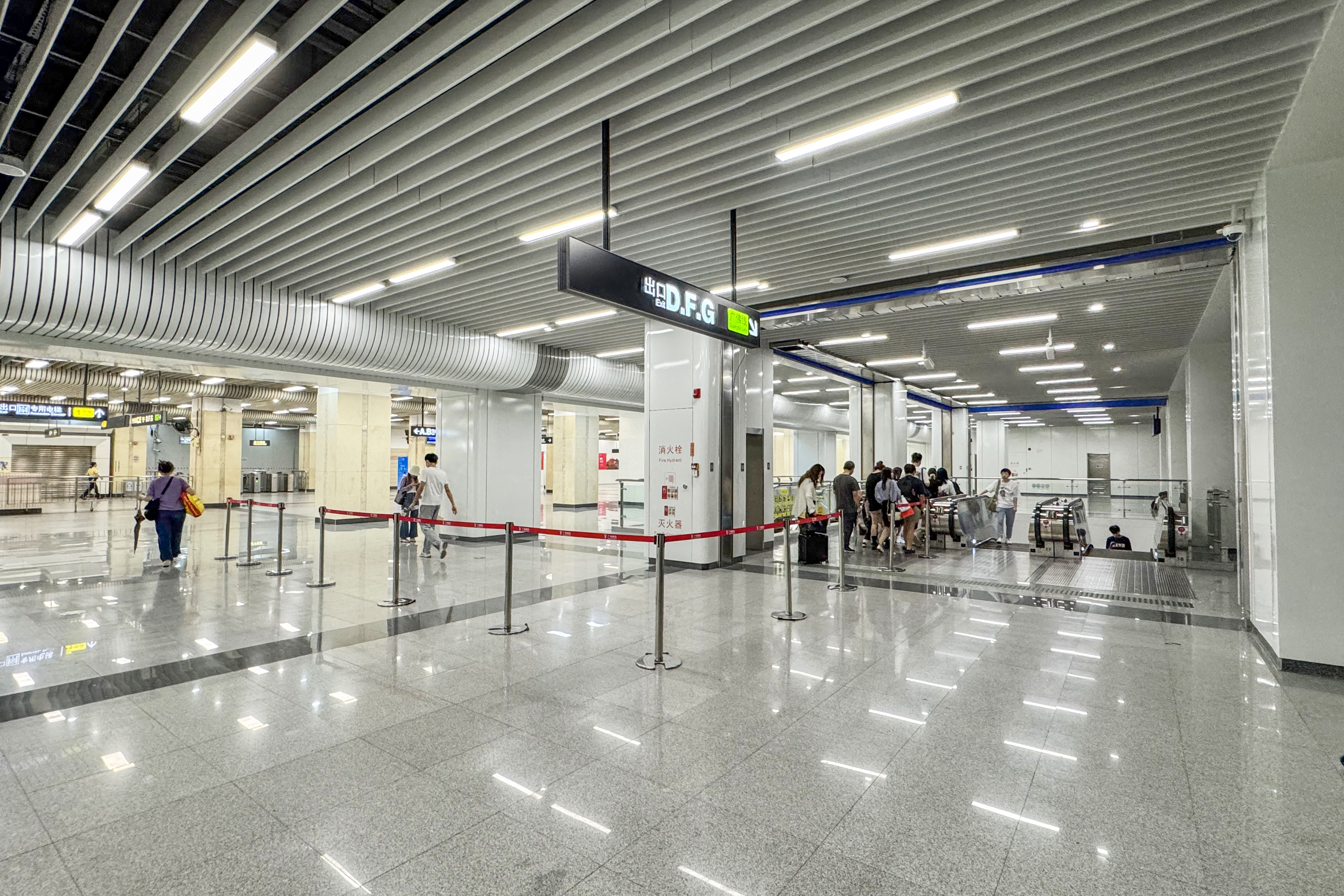
Escalator at the Line 1 eastern transfer building towards Guangfo line

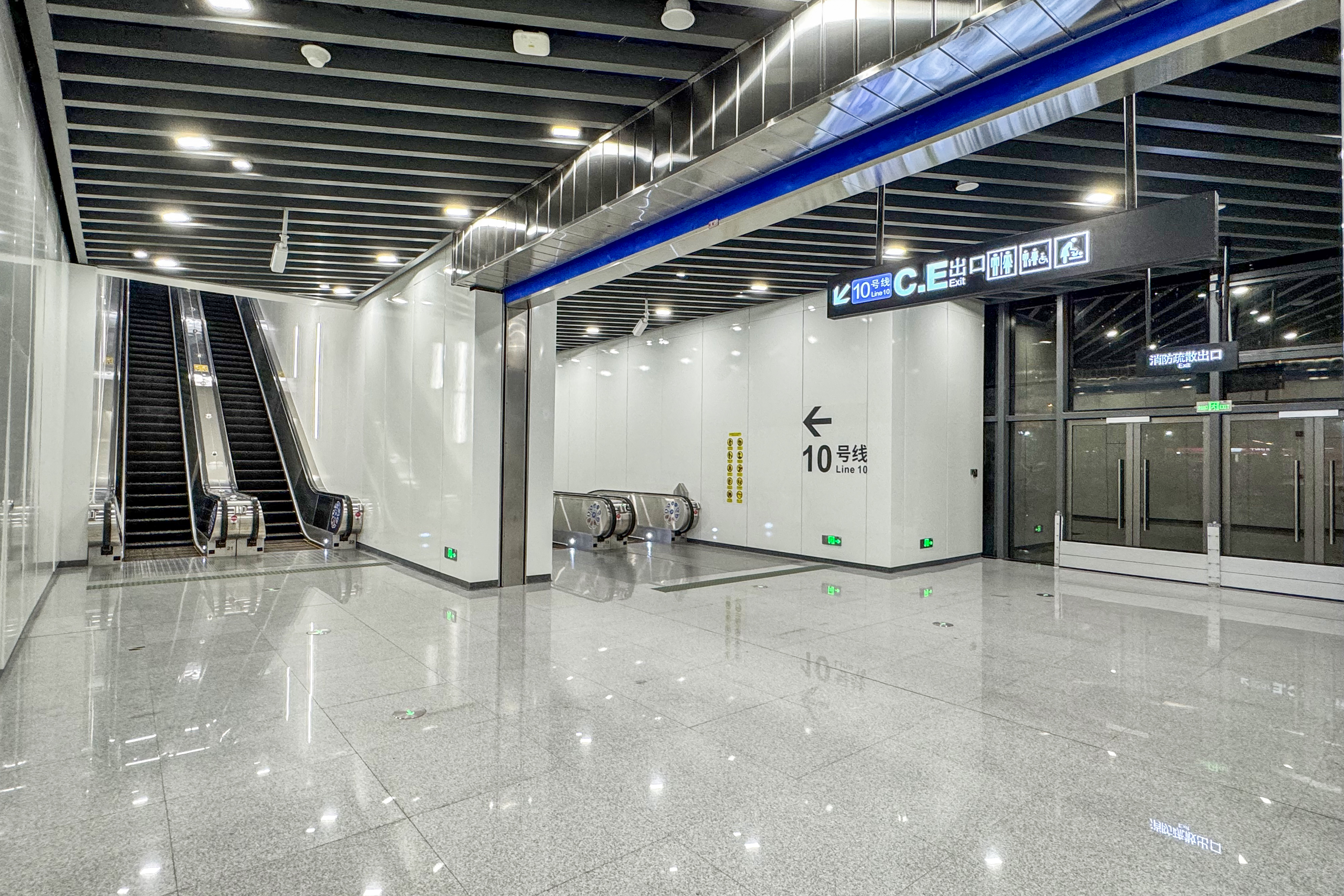
Eastern transfer building mezzanine (Line 1 towards Lines 10 and 22)

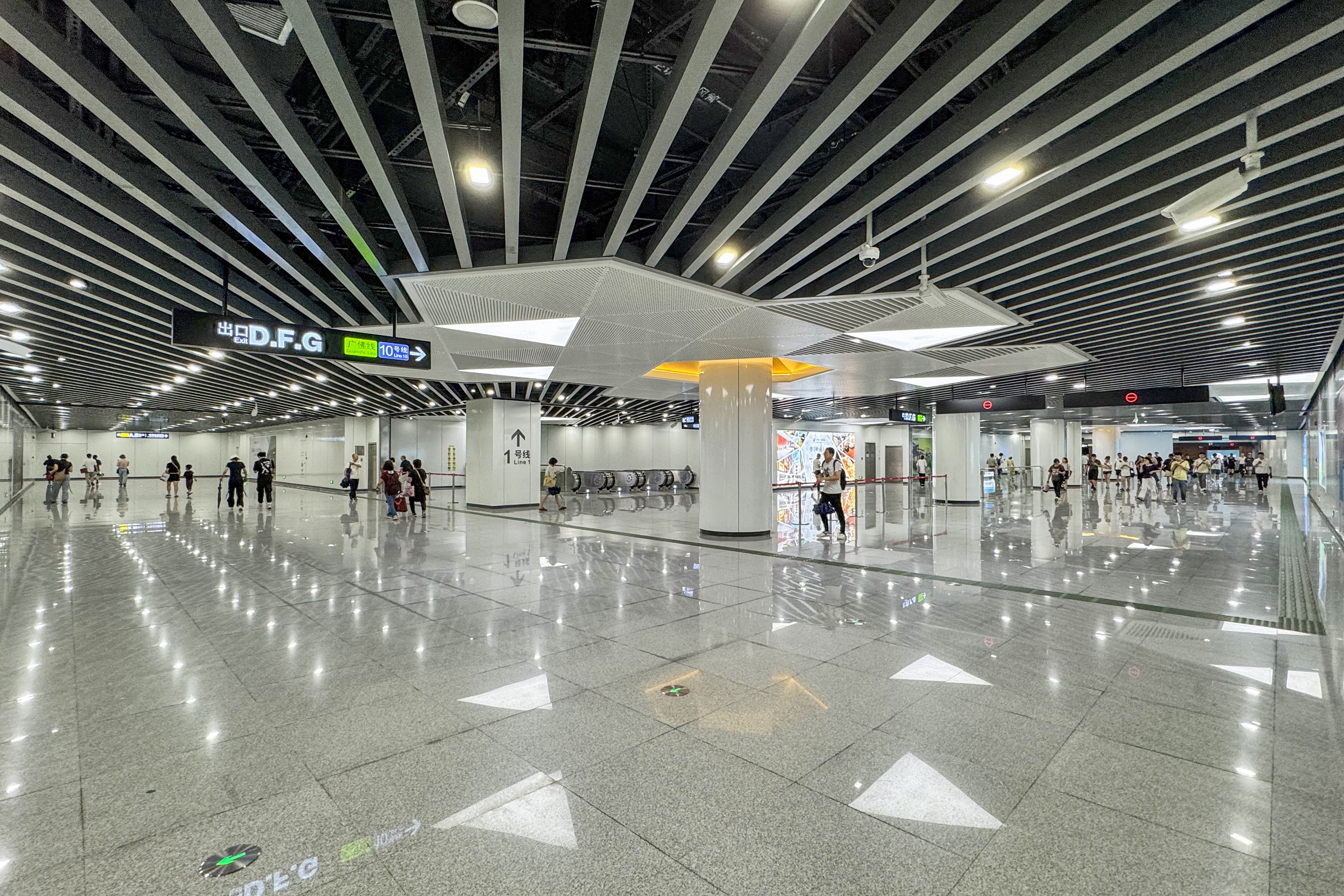
Line 10 concourse serving as a transfer concourse between all lines

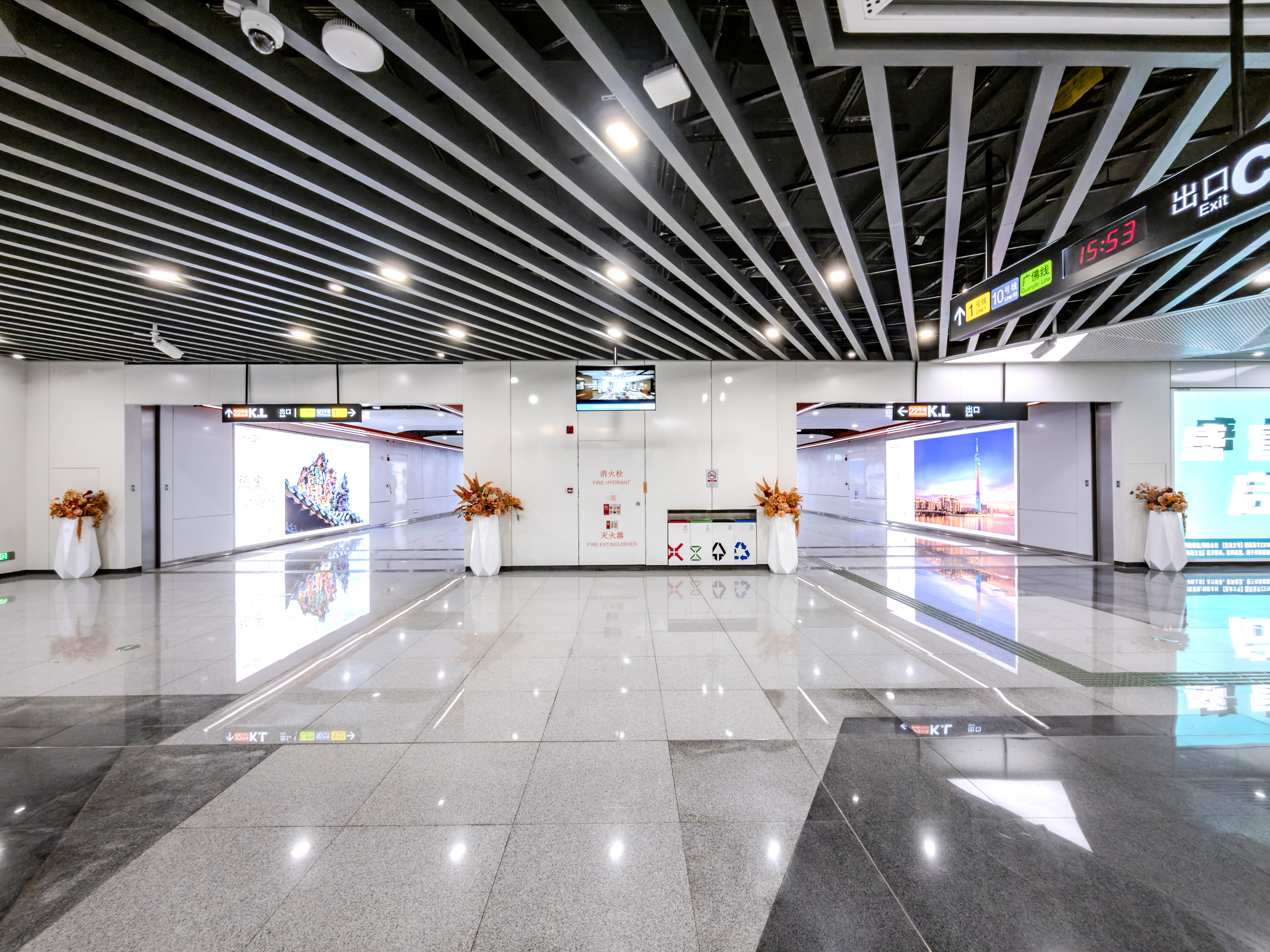
Transfer passage between Lines 10 and 22

=== Platforms ===
The Line 1 station uses two island platforms and a side platform located on ground level on the northwest side of the intersection of Huadi Avenue Middle and Huadi Avenue South. Line 1 adopts a turnback method before approach to the station, with the side platform and the westernmost island platform only for passengers to get off the train, and the island platform in the middle for passengers to get on the train. Line 10 has two side platforms located under the east side of the Line 1 station building. Line 22 has an island platform located on the west side of the Line 1 station building, underneath the southern bloc of the Line 1 depot. The Guangfo line has an island platform located on the east side of the Line 1 station building, underneath the eastern bloc of the Line 1 depot.

This station was originally equipped with the two characters "Xilang" in the Chinese SinoType computer calligraphy font on the Guangfo line platform, but after the station was renamed, because the computer font did not support the character "塱", it was replaced with the two characters "Xilang" in ordinary Ming typefaces style. The small relief calligraphy characters on the Line 1 platform maintained the same Chinese script before and after the name change, and the characters "塱" were spliced together with the characters "lang" (朗) and "soil" (土).

To the north of the platform of Line 1 of this station is the Xilang Depot, so some Line 1 trains will be withdrawn from service after arriving at this station during the morning and evening rush hours and for the last services of the day. These trains will enter the west or middle of the station to clear passengers, while the train and platform will broadcast a service broadcast to remind passengers not to stay on the train, then close the door and immediately return to the depot.

There is a set of crossover lines at both ends of the Line 10 platform for trains to turnback, and under normal circumstances, the crossover line at the north end of the station will be used for post-station turnback, and in addition, there are two other rails to the Guanggang New Town Depot on the main line in the direction of Huawei station.

There is a set of double-storage lines on the east side of the Guangfo line platform, and when there is a fault in the section east of Xilang, the Guangfo line can use the storage line to turnback, and use this station as the temporary terminus, in which passengers can use other means of transportation to each station along the way from Hedong to Lijiao. When this station was the initial terminus between 2010 and 2015, the storage lines were also used for train turnback.

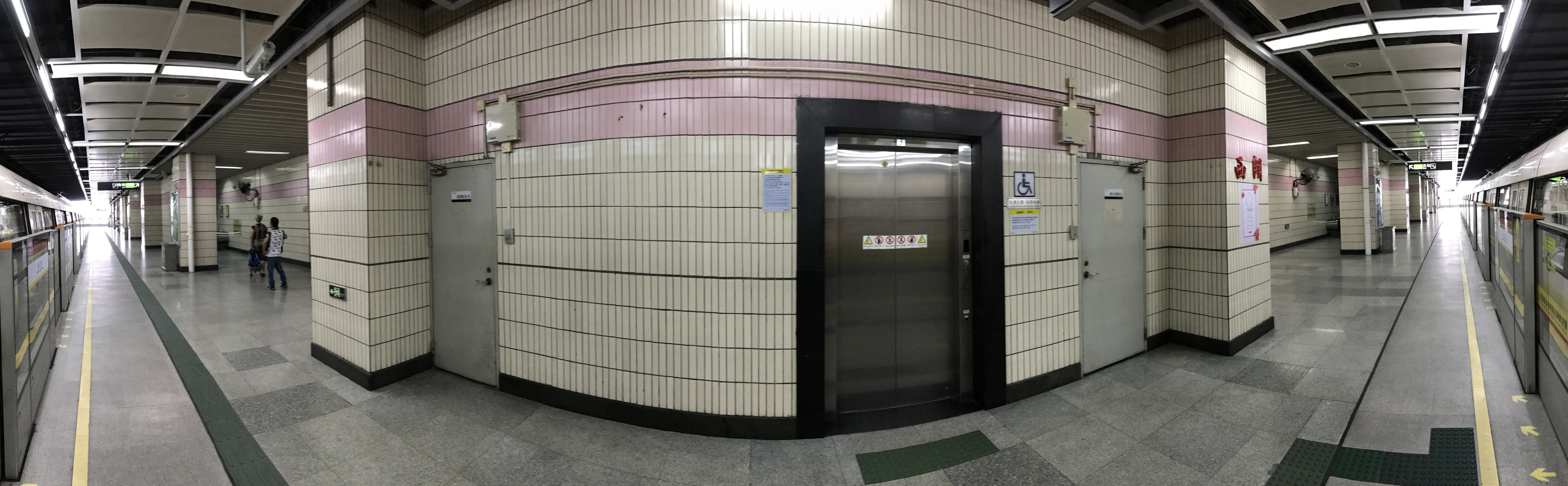
Line 1 platform 1 panorama (alighting platform)

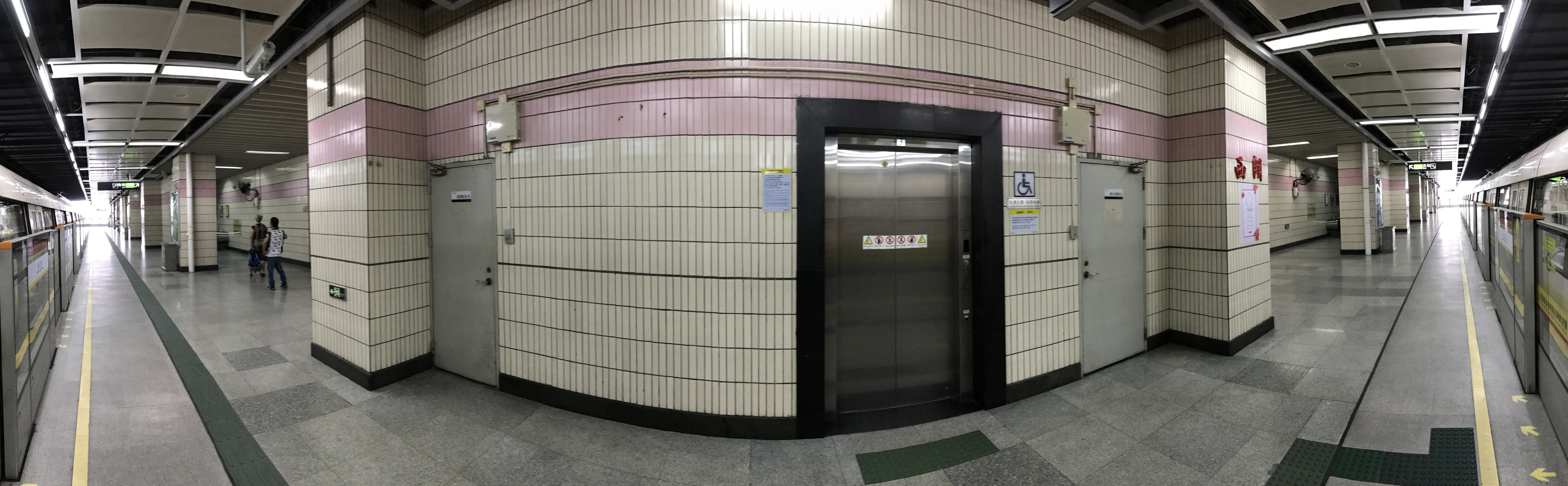
Line 1 platform 3 panorama (boarding platform)

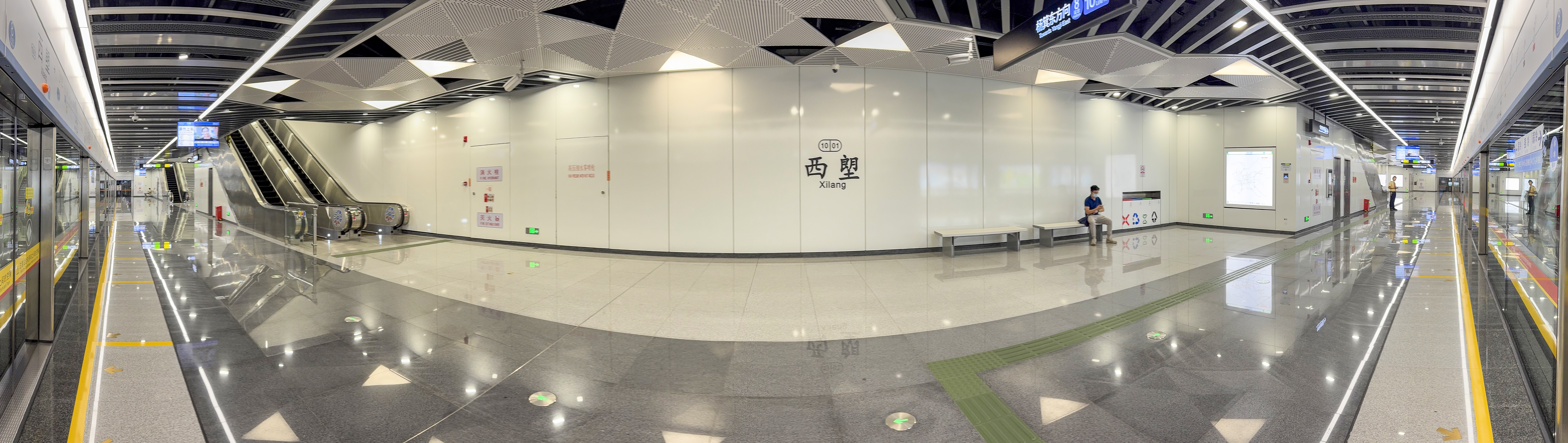
Line 10 platform 9 panorama (boarding platform)

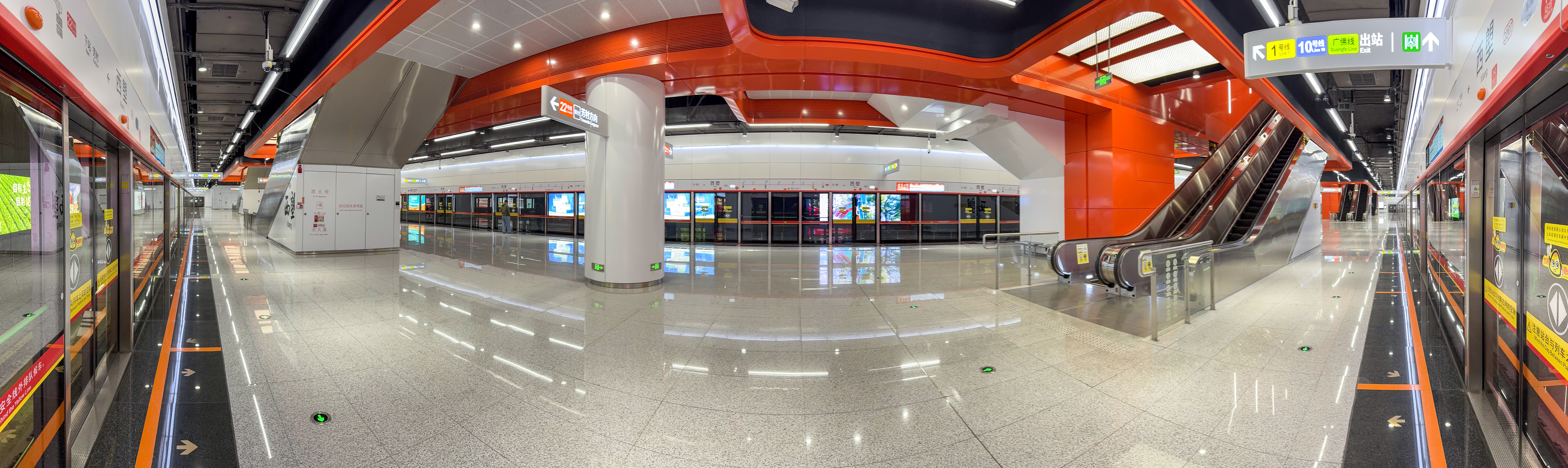
Line 22 platform panorama

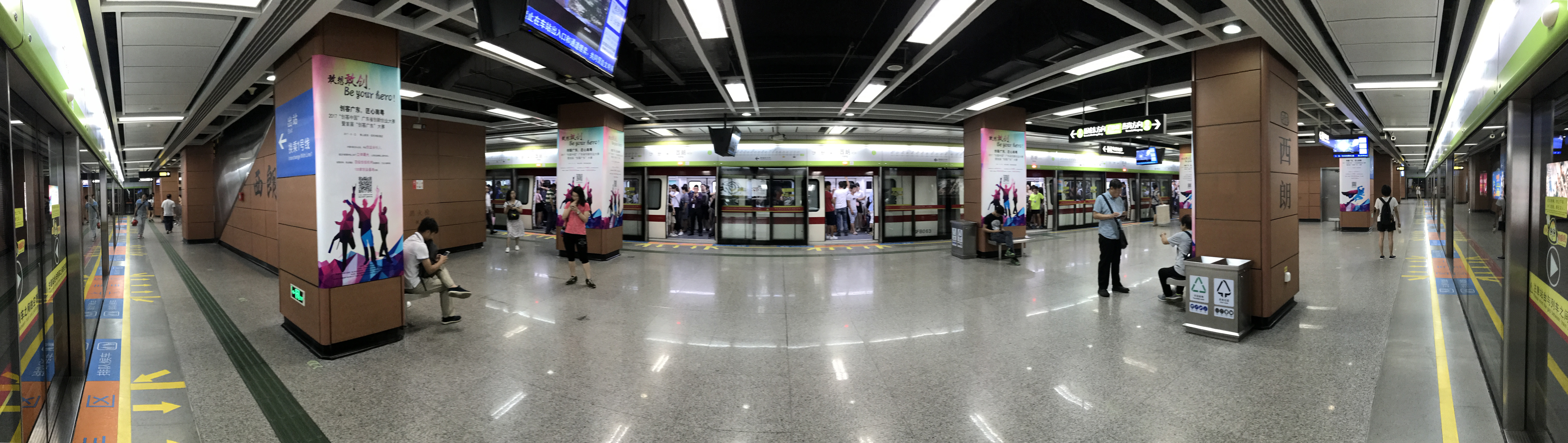
Guangfo line platform panorama

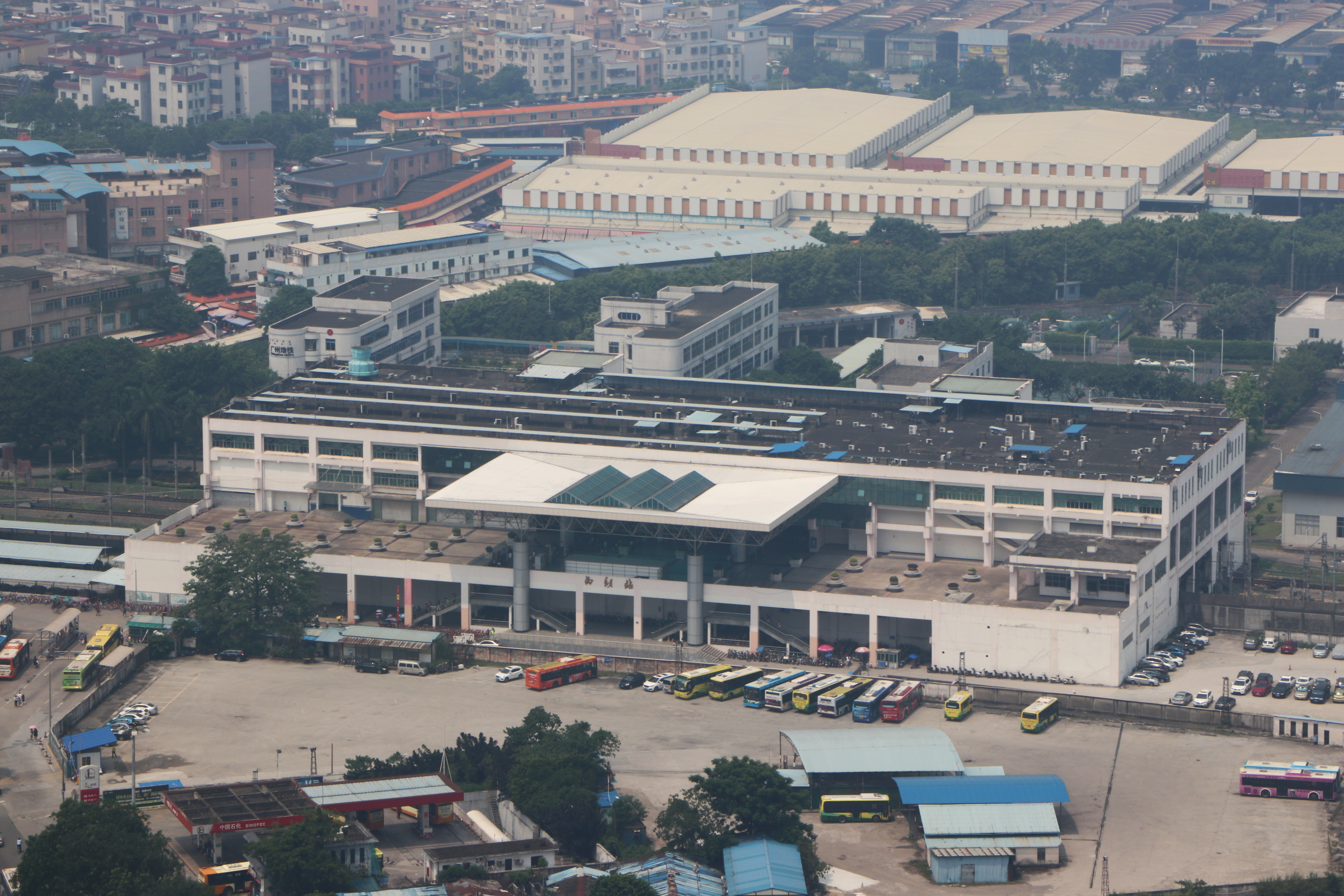
Line 1 exterior

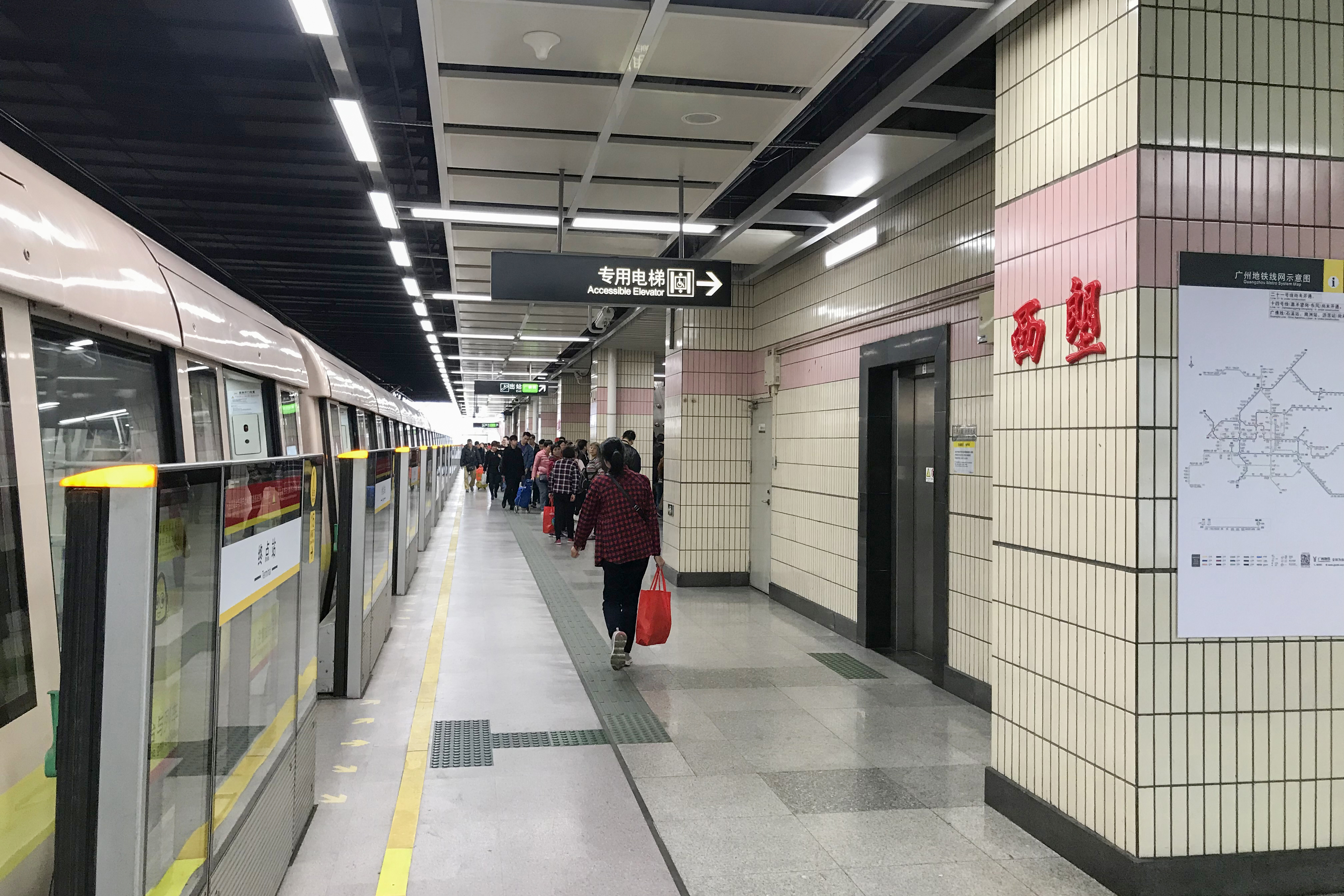
Platform 1 (Line 1 alighting platform)

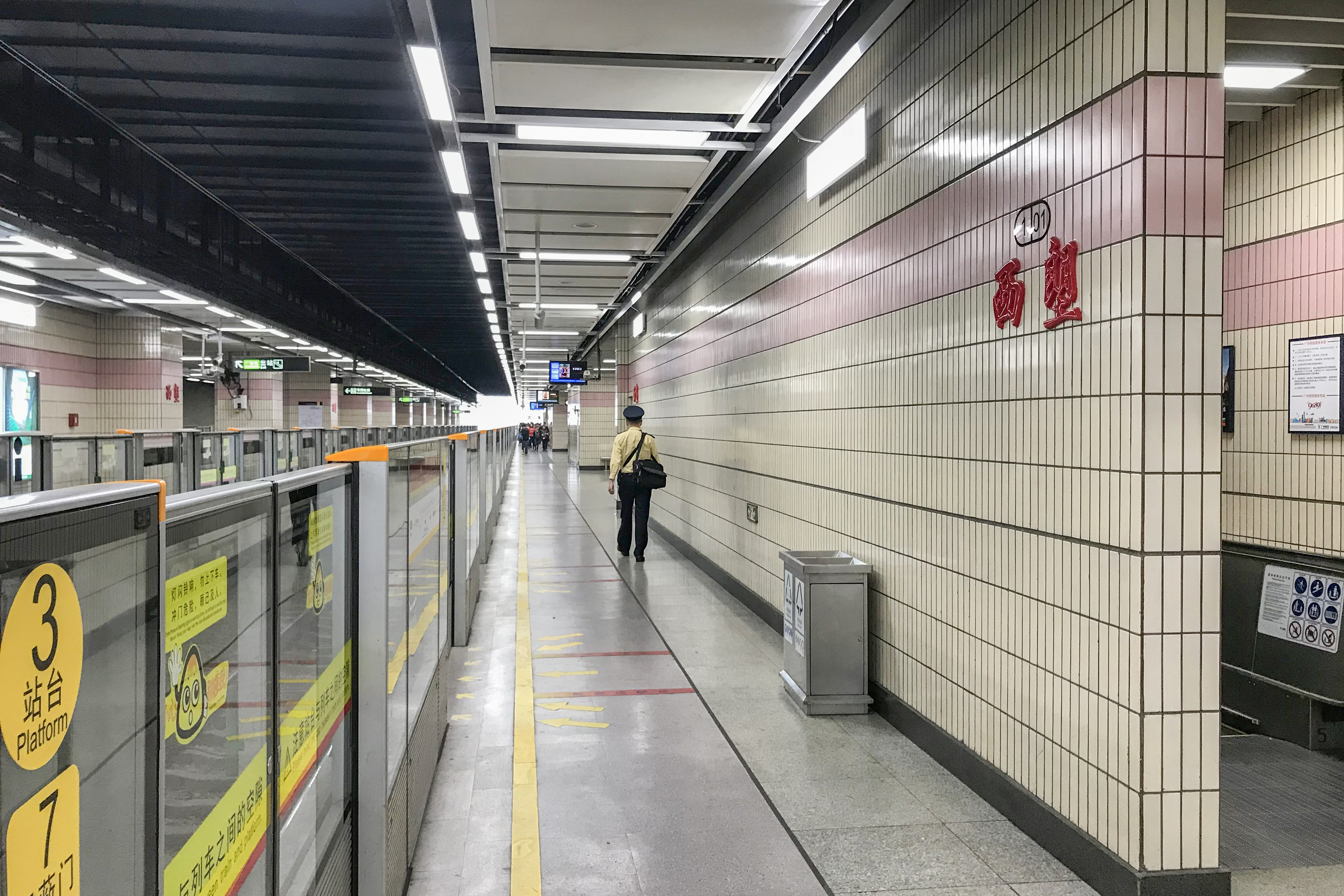
Platform 3 (Line 1 boarding platform)

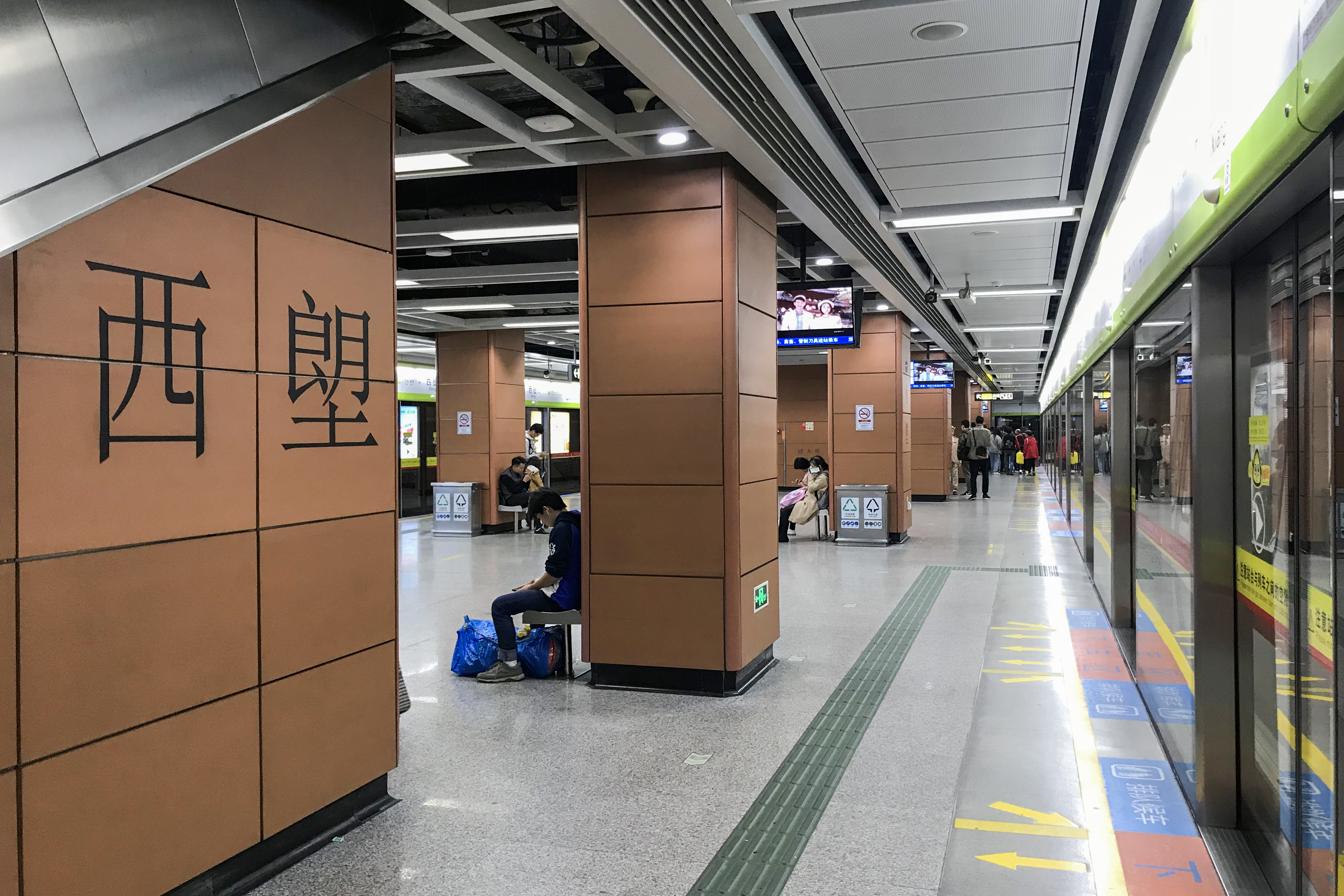
Guangfo Line platform

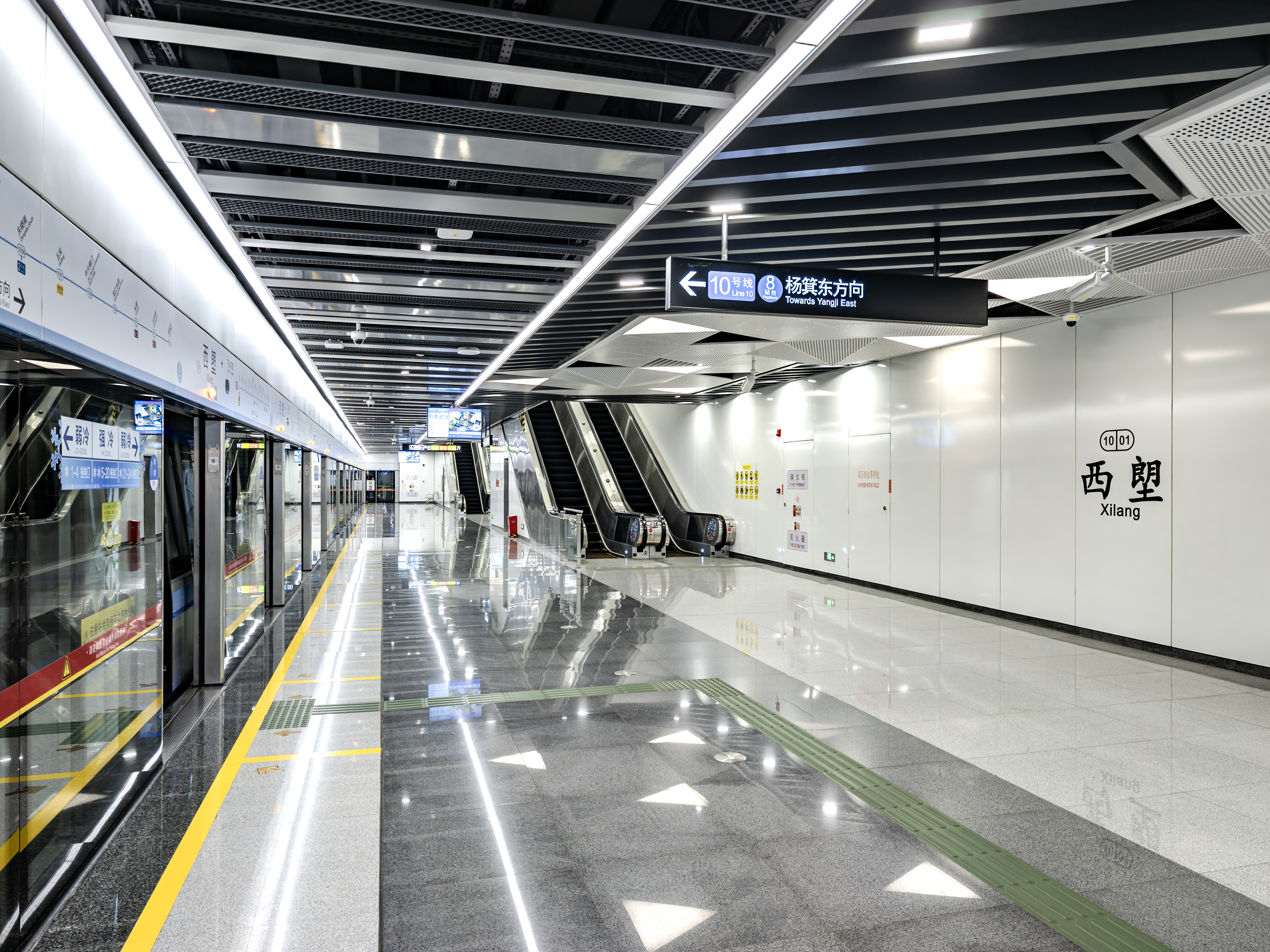
Platform 8 (Line 10 boarding platform)

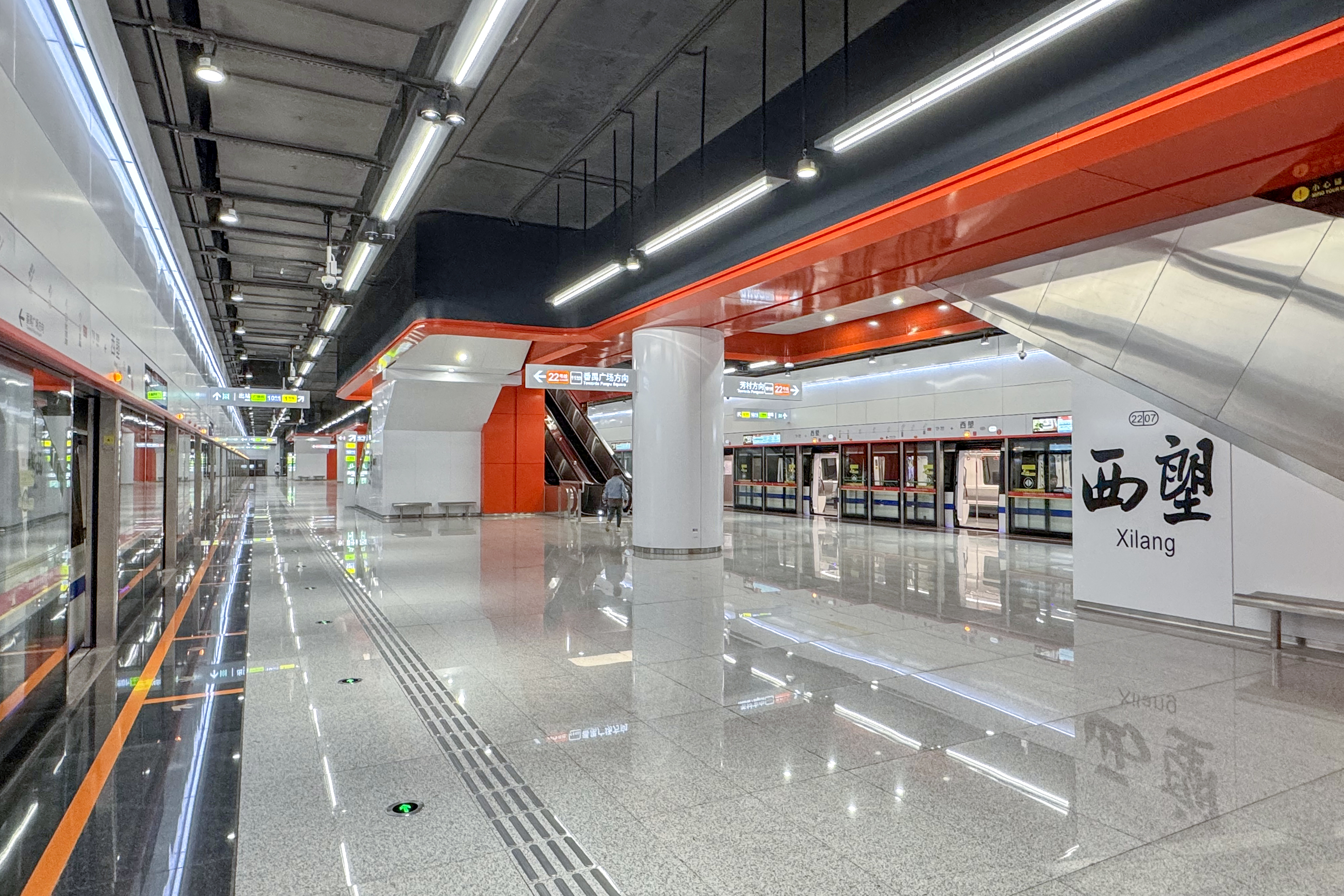
Line 22 platform

=== Entrances/exits ===
The station has 9 points of entry/exit, distributed between the Line 1, Line 10, Line 22 and Guangfo line concourses. In its initial opening, the station had Exits A and B, whilst Exits D and J were added in the Guangfo line station's initial opening. On 28 September 2016, Exit F was added, and on 1 January 2022, Exit G was added. In order to cooperate with the construction of the Line 10 station, the original Exits A and B were closed and dismantled on 14 January 2022, new Exits A and B will be constructed on the south side of the concourse, equipped with escalators and disabled elevators. Exit J was closed on 22 January the same year to facilitate construction of the temporary transfer passage. When the Line 10 station was opened, Exits C and E were added. When the Line 22 station was opened, Exits K and L were added.

In addition, there are multiple sets of turnstiles in the middle of the west side of the Line 1 concourse, which can be used by employees to travel directly between the station and the nearby Xilang Depot.

- A: Huadi Avenue South
- B: Huadi Avenue South
- C: Huadi Avenue South
- D: Huadi Avenue Middle
- E: Huadi Avenue South
- F: Huadi Avenue Middle
- G: Huadi Avenue Middle, First People's Hospital Eye Otolaryngology and Oral Center
- K: Huadi Avenue South
- L: Huadi Avenue South

Exits A, E and L are equipped with elevators.

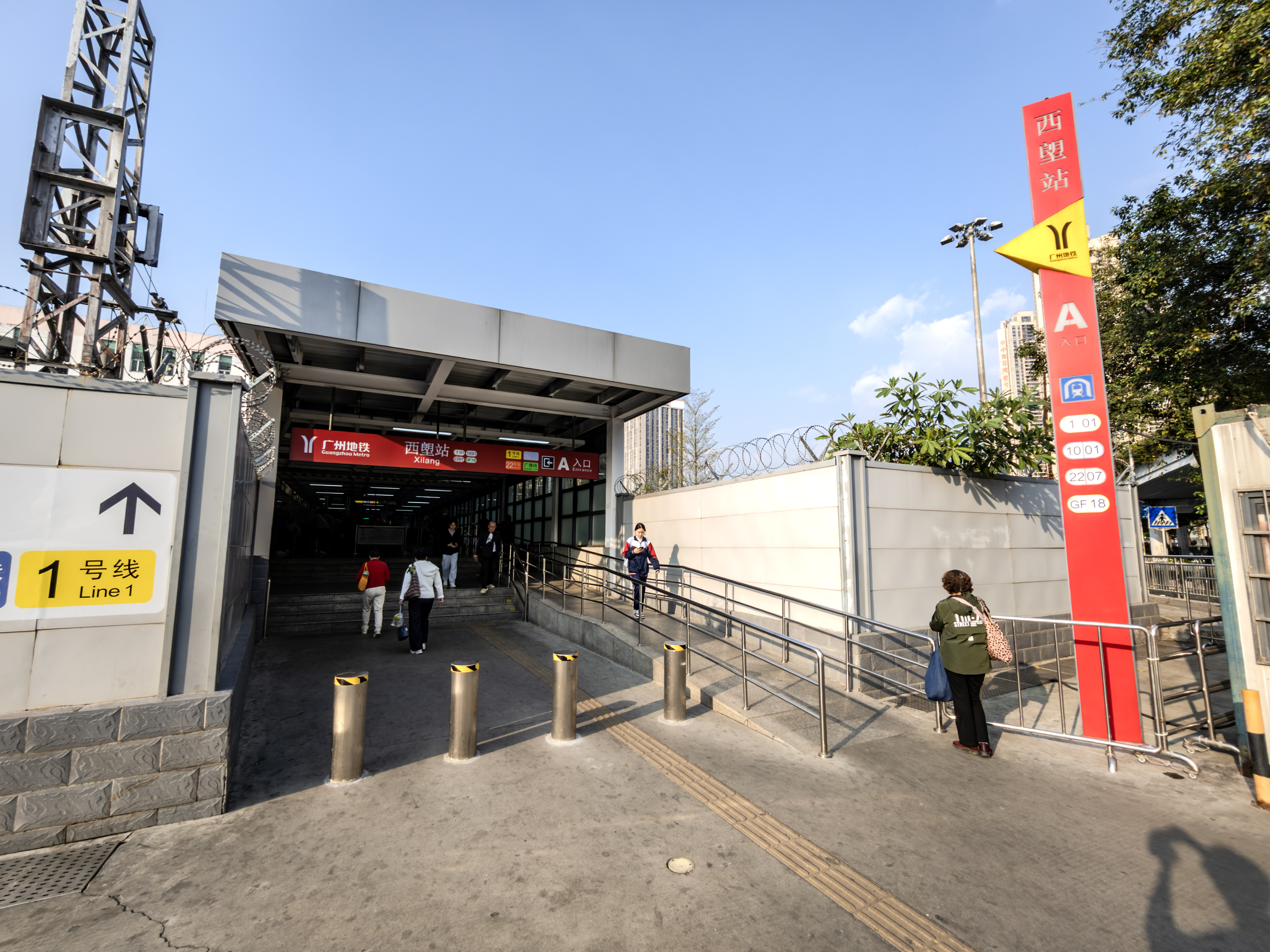
Entrance A

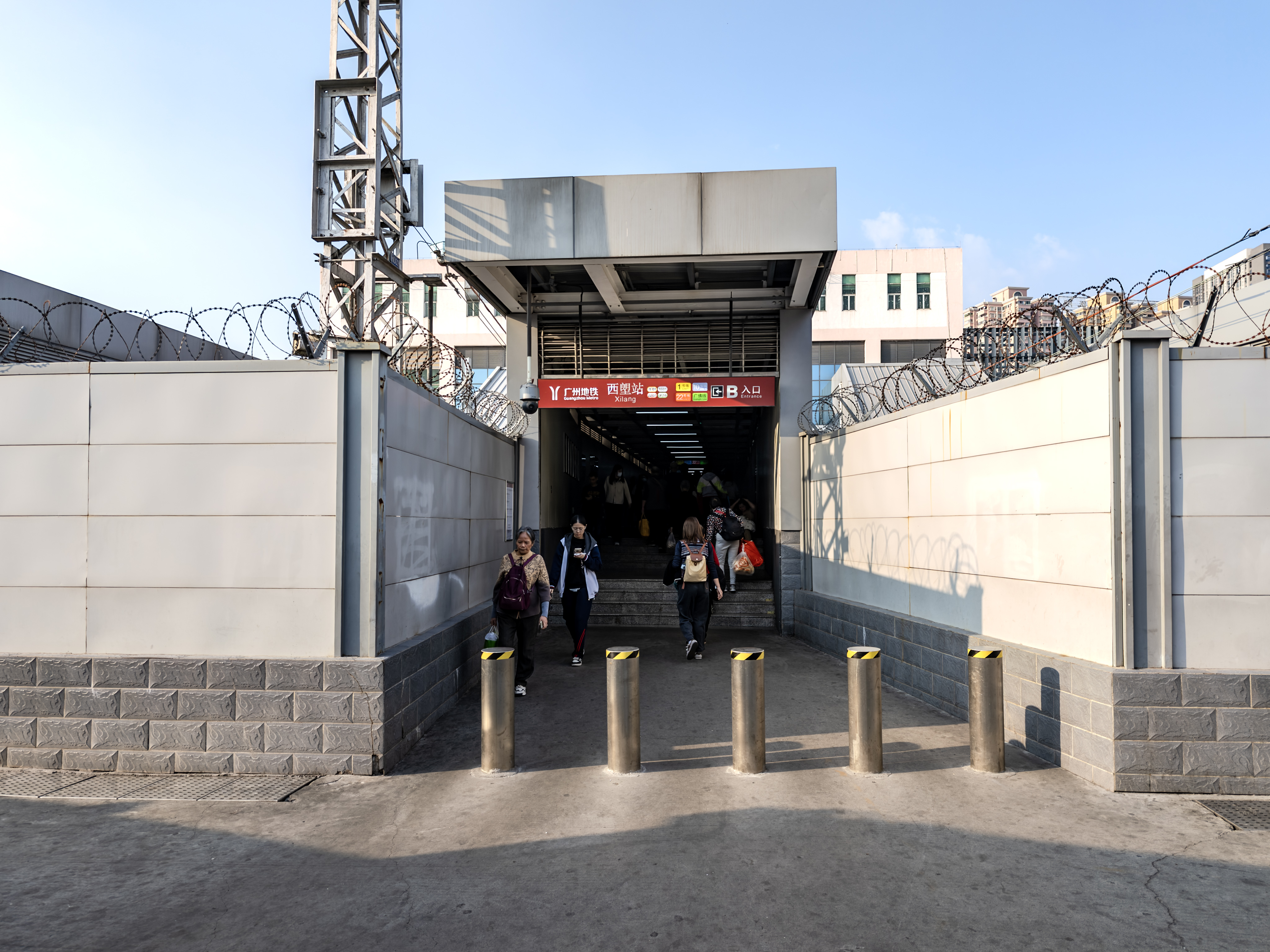
Entrance B

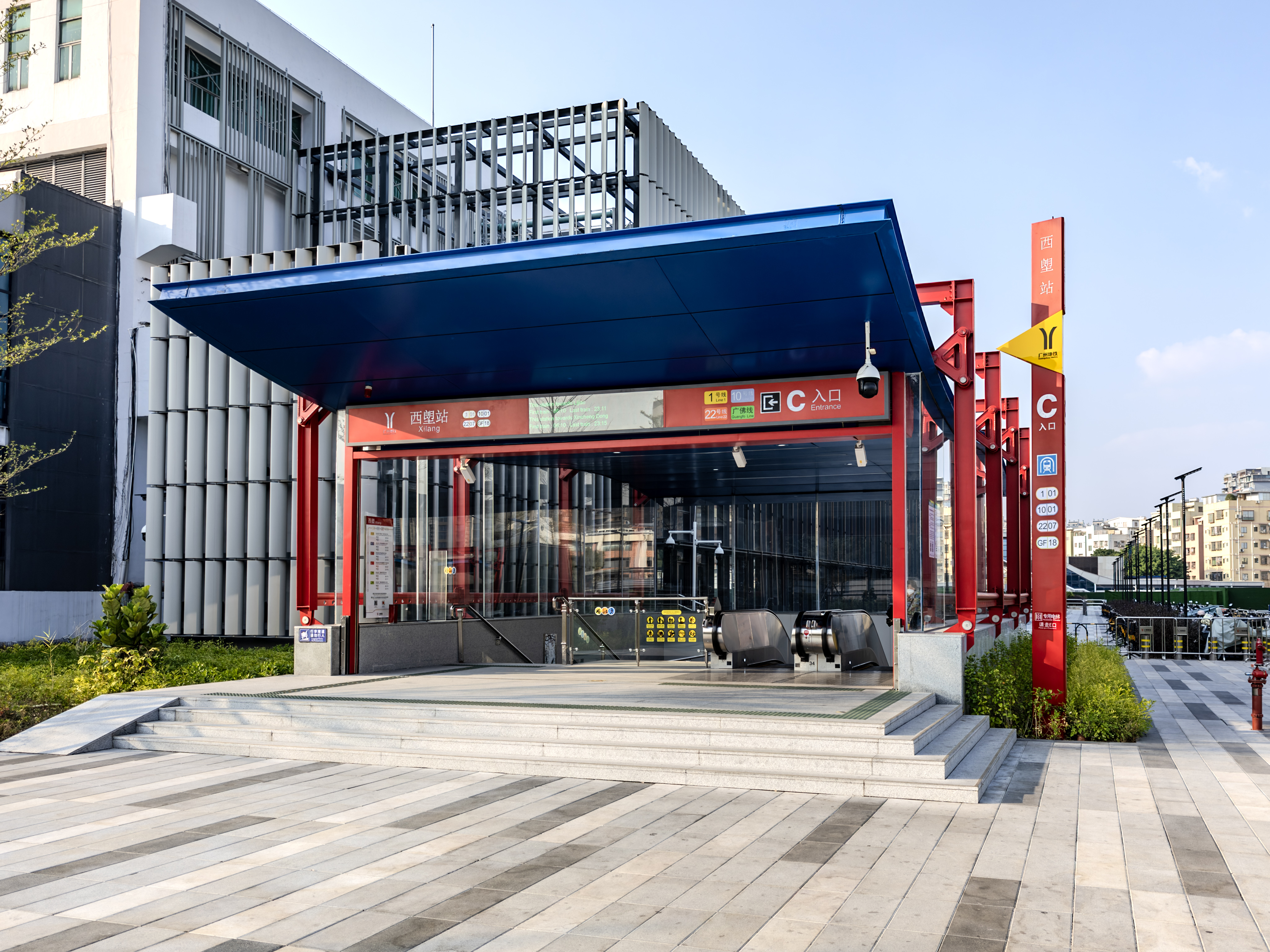
Entrance C

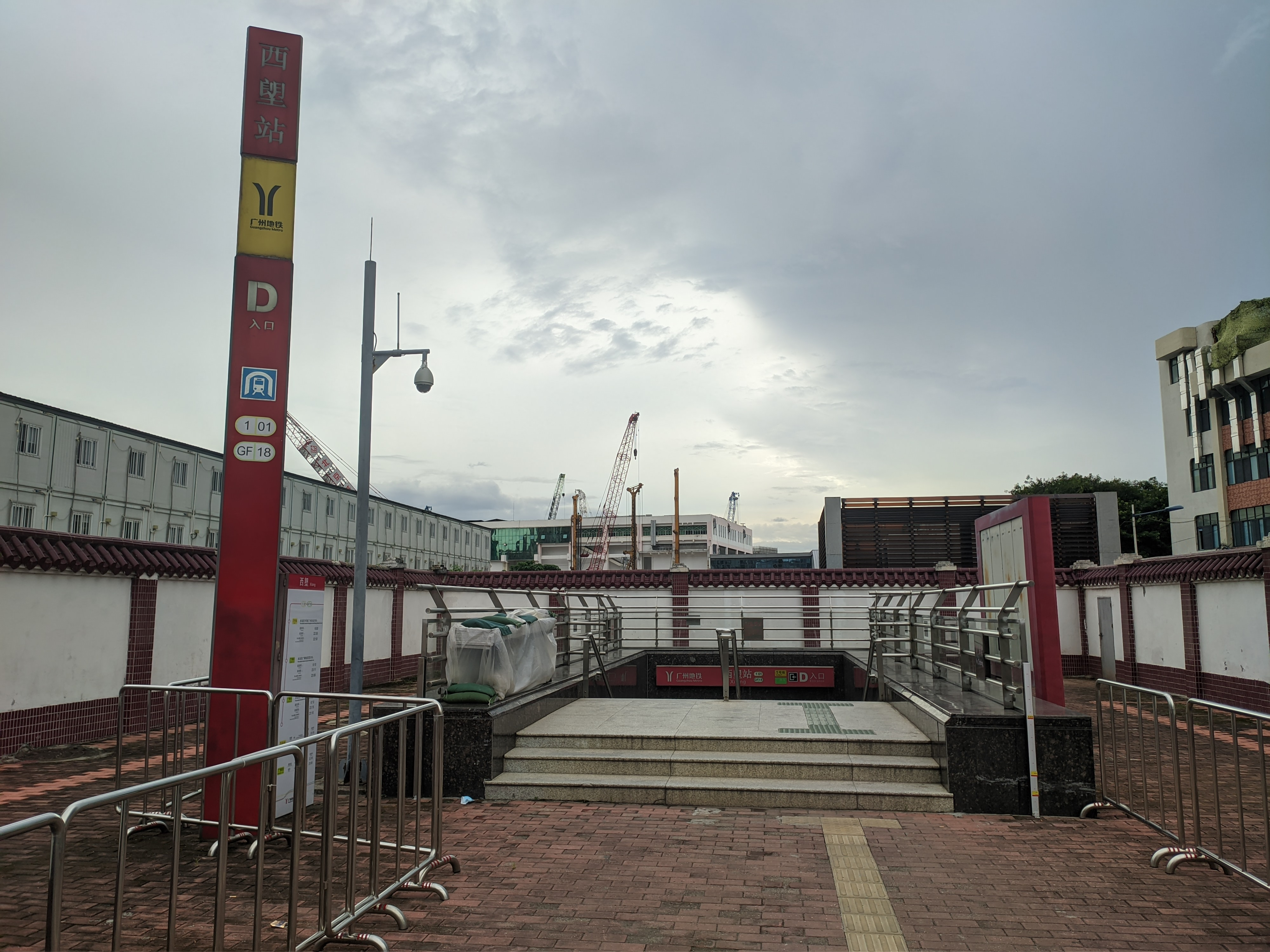
Entrance D

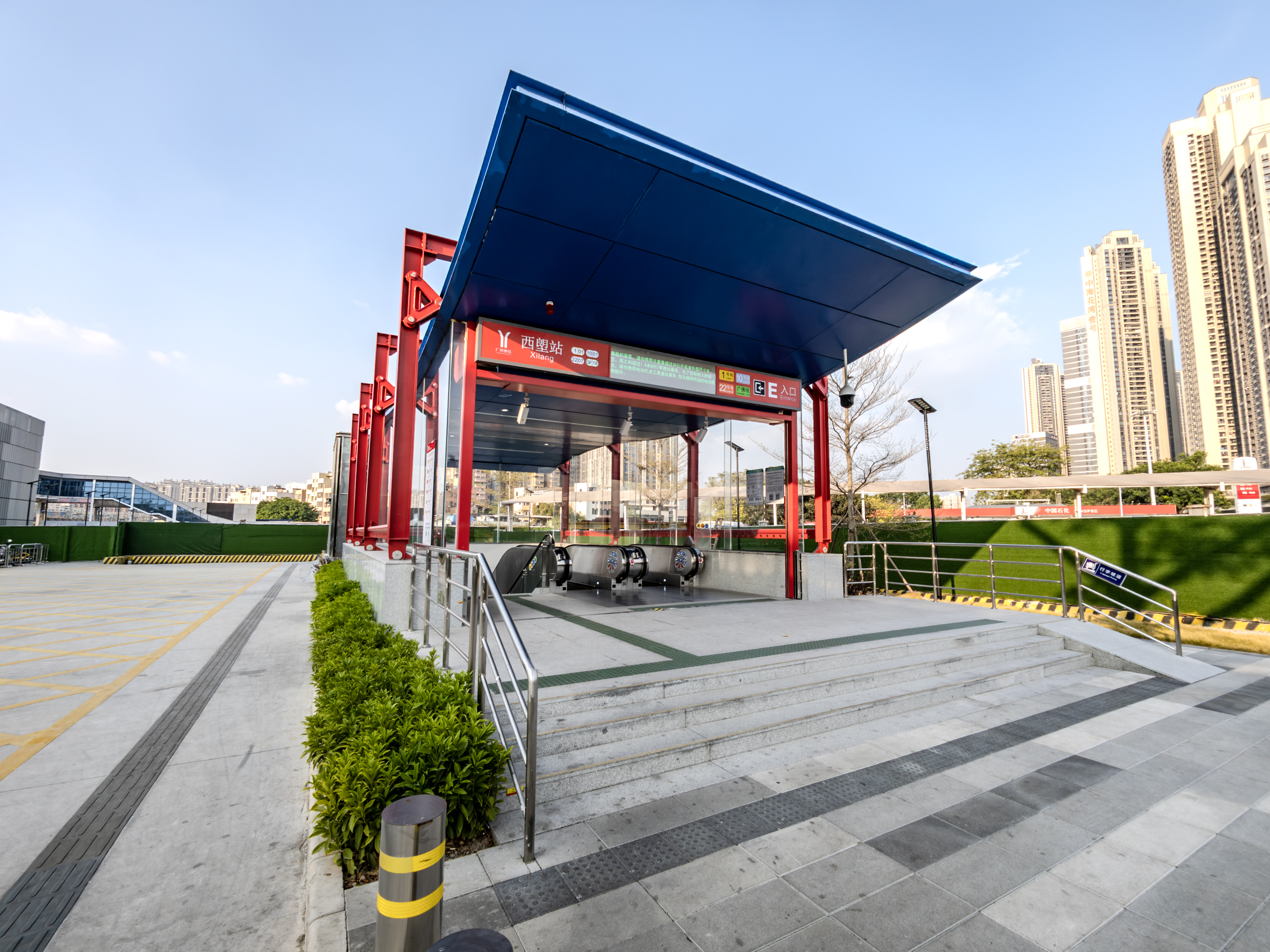
Entrance E

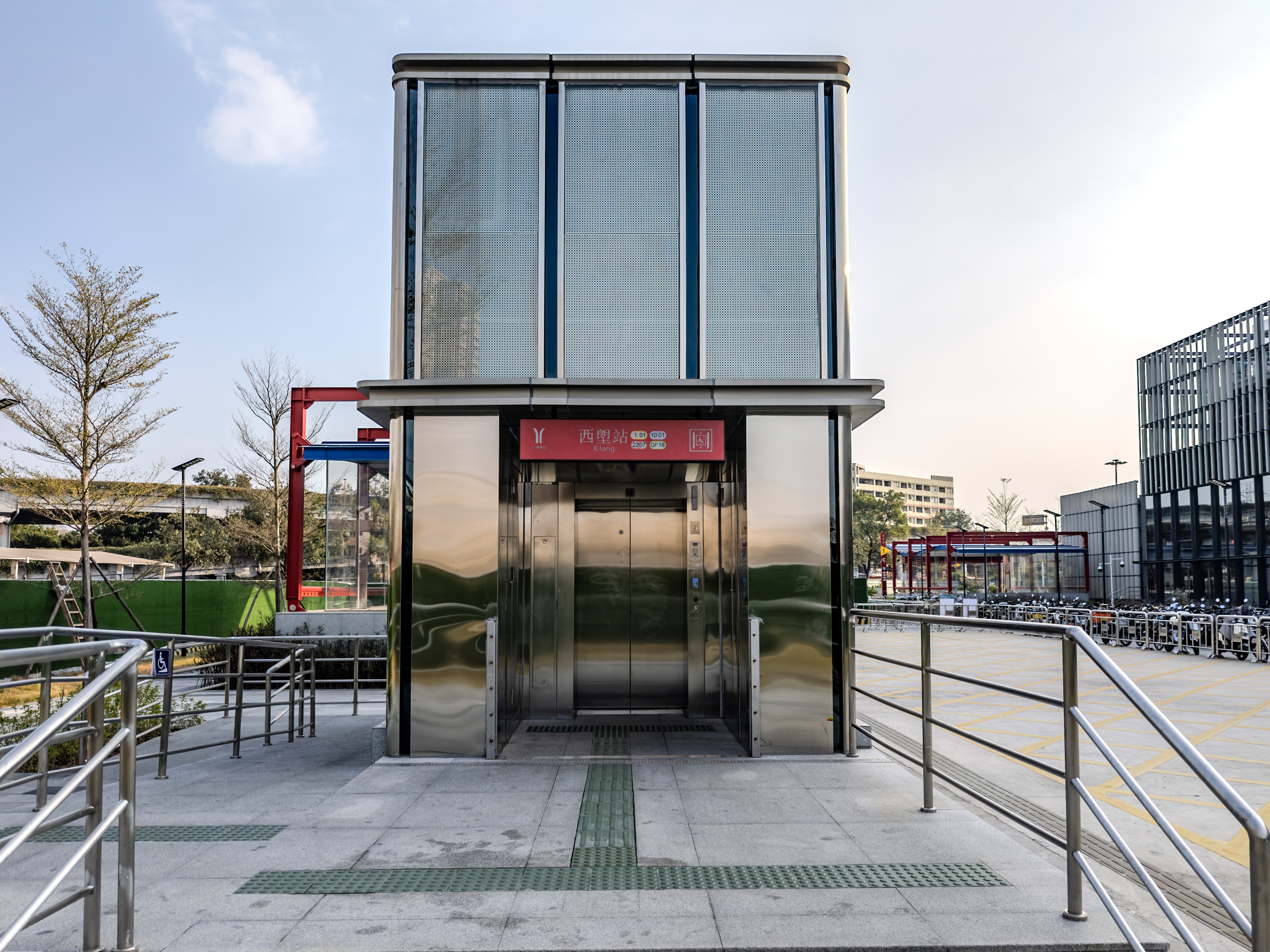
Elevator of Entrance E

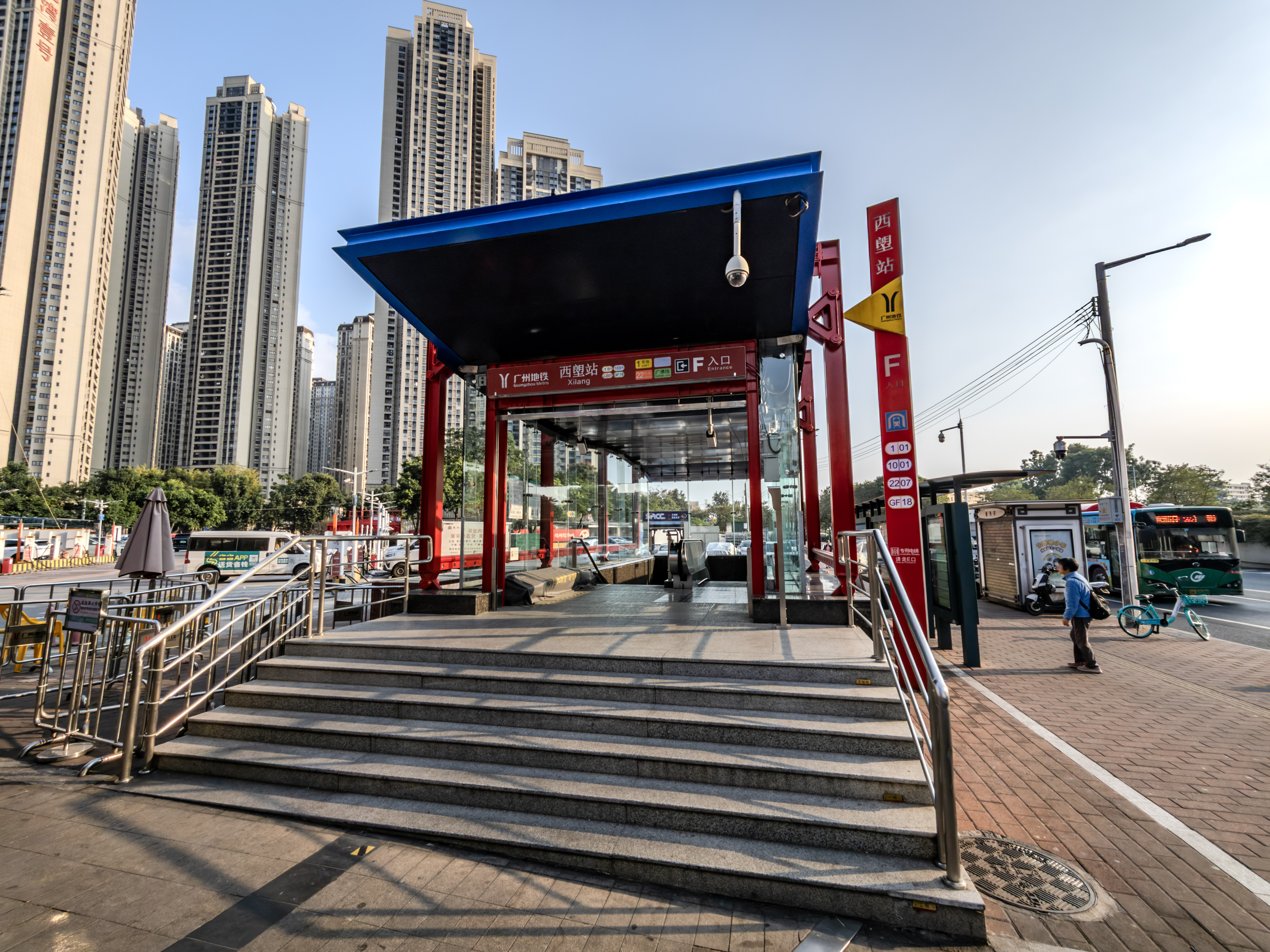
Entrance F

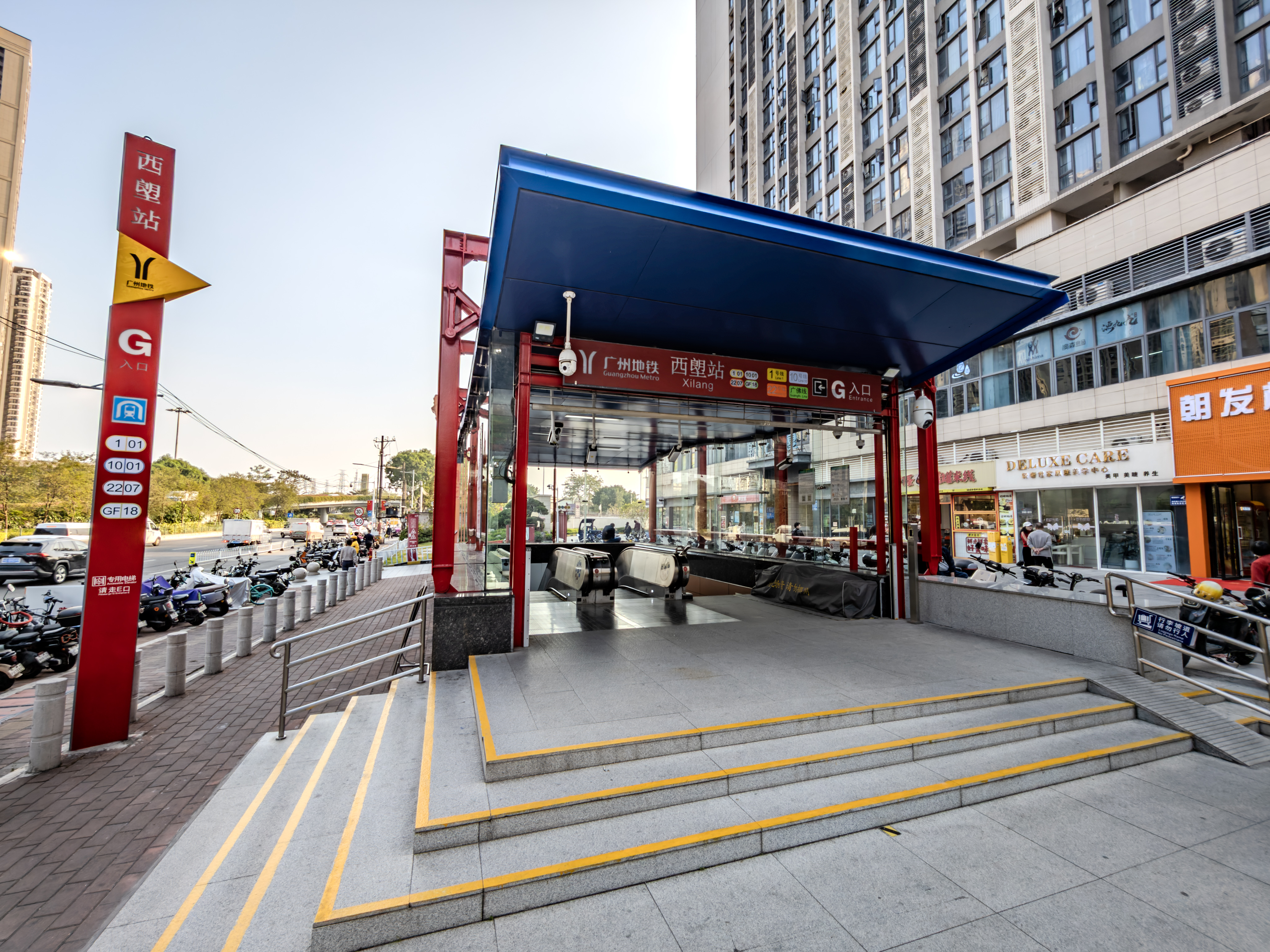
Entrance G

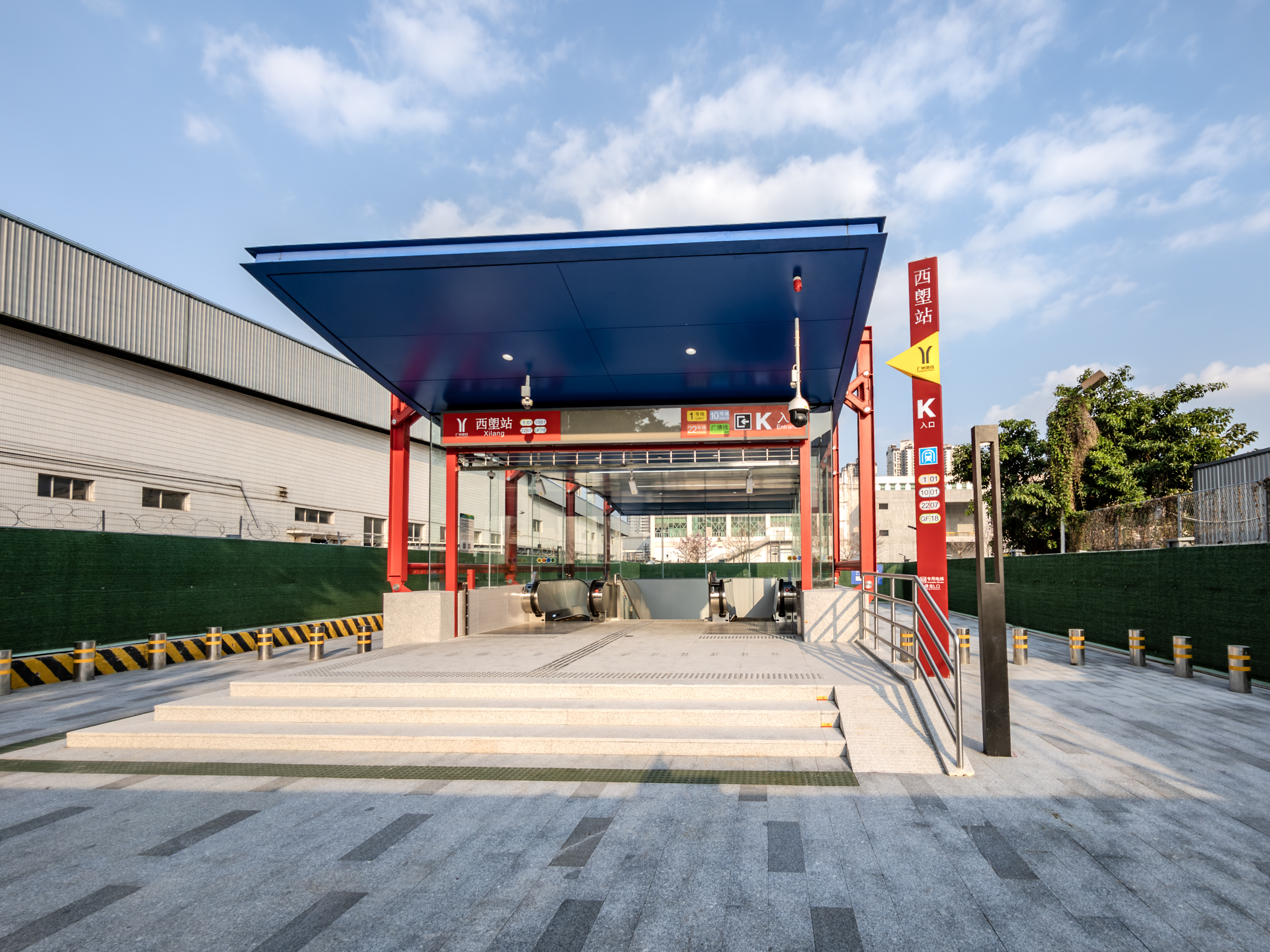
Entrance K

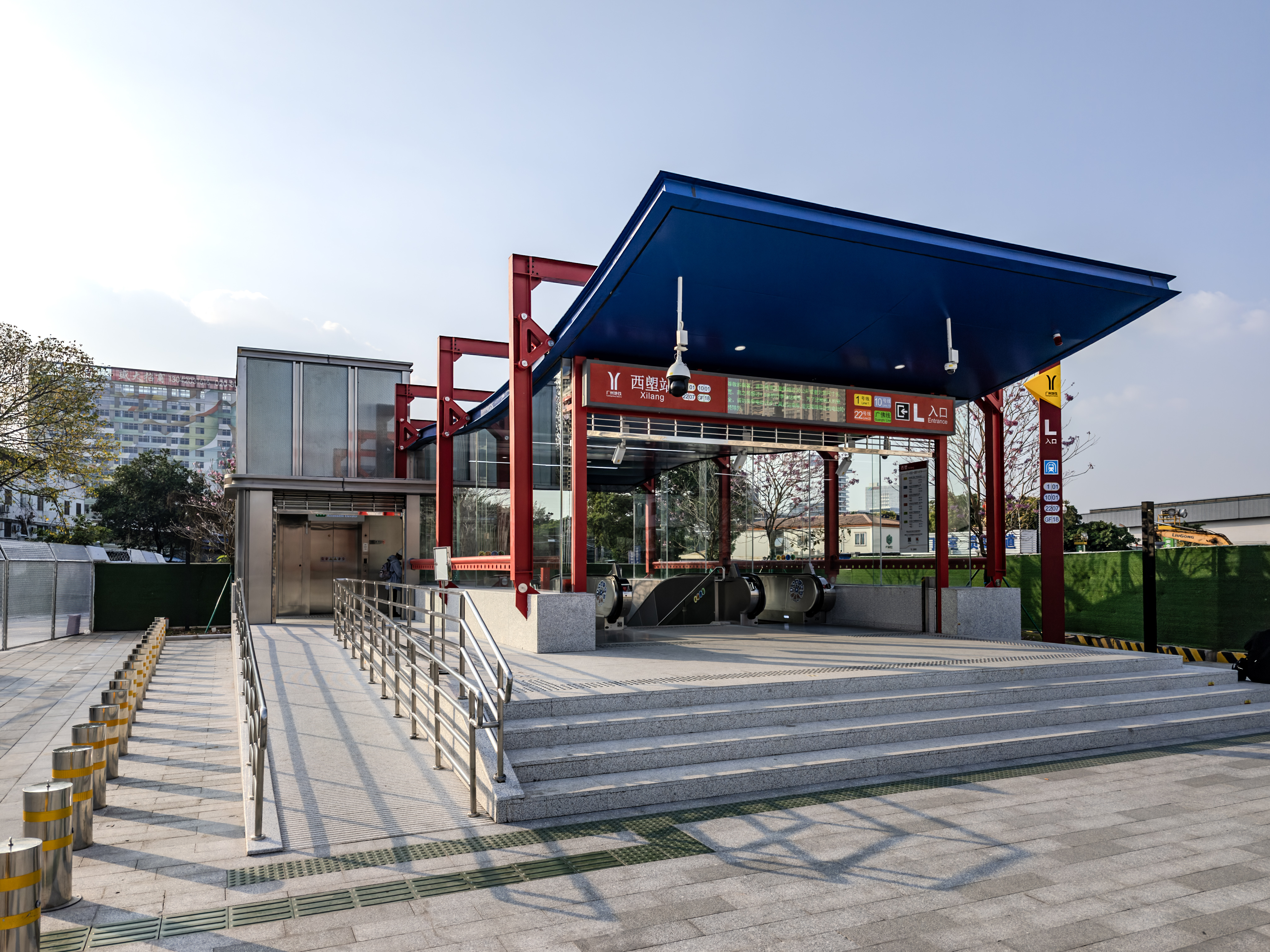
Entrance L

== Usage ==
Since the station opened in 1997, the passenger flow has been low for more than a decade, and the station is relatively large yet deserted, as there are only Guangzhou Iron and Steel's headquarters (demolished), agricultural fields and urban villages nearby, and there are no large residential areas, commercial centers or tourist attractions. This situation remained in place until 3 November 2010, when the Guangfo line opened. As it was still a free ride day for the Asian Games, a large number of passengers waiting to take the Guangfo line gathered in the Line 1 concourse before 2 p.m., which was unprecedented in the 13 years since the station opened. The excessive number of passengers who were in a hurry to "try the new" also caused chaos for a time. Passenger flow control was implemented for more than five hours at the station.

At present, as the first transfer station after the Guangfo Metro entered Guangzhou, the station has changed the deserted situation of more than ten years in the past, and many passengers between the two cities pass through this station every day, becoming an important transfer station of the Guangzhou Metro. As the Guangfo Metro continues to extend into Haizhu District, passengers travelling between Fangcun and Haizhu will also change trains at this station. At present, during the evening peak hours on weekdays and public holidays, there will be a large number of passengers waiting on platform 7 of the Guangfo line (Foshan direction), and the waiting queue will be extended to the opposite platform 6. At the same time, due to the relatively large gap in the operating capacity between Line 1 and the Guangfo line, it is necessary to implement passenger flow control measures at this station to reduce the speed at which passengers change from Line 1 to the Guangfo line to maintain the Guangfo line operation order.

== History ==
=== Planning ===
In 1987, the then Guangzhou municipal government was ready to introduce French capital for subway construction. This station appeared as a station for the first phase of the project (Line 1) and was called the Guangzhong Highway station. Later, the "Cross Line" plan was confirmed, and construction of this station was also confirmed, but the name was changed to Guanggang station, and then changed to Xilang station before it opened.

In addition, when the station was built, a structure was reserved on the third above-ground floor for the Guangzhou-Foshan Light Rail (now Guangfo Metro) to set up a station, which shows that there was already a concept of connecting Guangzhou and Foshan through rail transit at that time. Later, in the 2003 underground railway plan, construction of the Guangfo Metro was implemented, and a station was set up here. However, during the planning, it was clear that this station was an intermediate station of the Guangfo Metro, so the station chose to build a new underground station to the northeast of the station building.

Line 10 was originally planned with Dongsha as its terminus at the southwest end. In order to better connect the network and cooperate with the development of Guanggang New Town, it was extended to this station in the 2015 network plan and finally implemented.

Line 22 originally appeared as the western end of the "Fangcun-Panyu-Huangpu Line" in the 2002 alternative, but was later changed to facilitate the connection to the Guangzhou New Passenger Station (now Guangzhou South Railway Station). It was also used as an intermediate station for the "Bai'etan Liaison Express" in the 2010 network plan until Line 22 and the original planned Line 18 exchanged numbers. The alignment was then extended from Guangzhou South Railway Station to Bai'etan, in which this station was still set up in between, before construction was finally implemented under the name of Line 22.

=== Line 1 ===
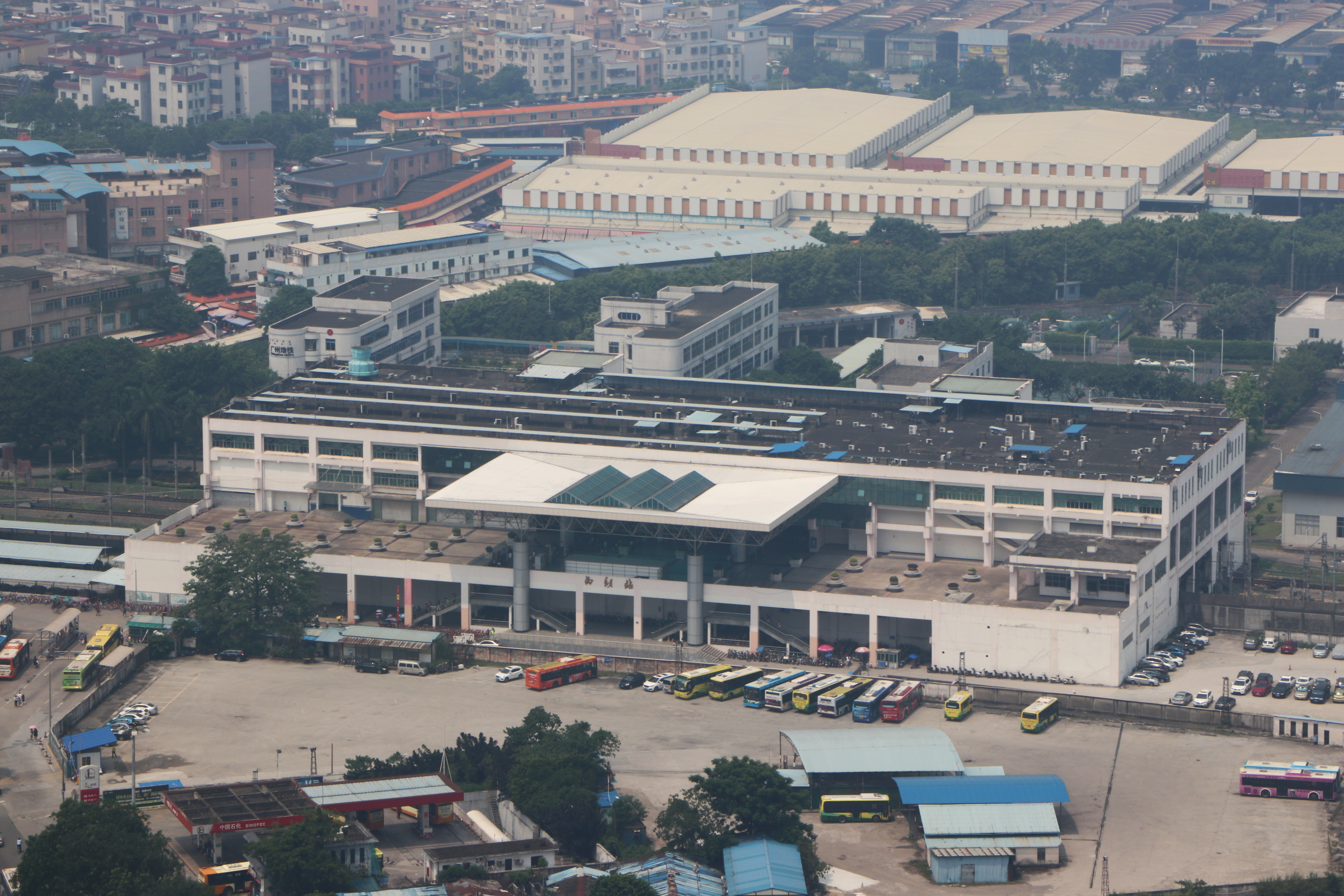
Line 1 station exterior in 2017

On 28 December 1993, construction of Line 1 officially started. This station was also being built along with its other stations. The five stations from this station to Huangsha were opened for service on 28 June 1997. The opening ceremony of the first section was held in the square in front of the station, and the first train of Line 1 also departed from the station to Huangsha Station.

In 2004, the metro company decided to install screen doors or half-height safety doors at all stations on Line 1, including this station. On 22 July 2009, the half-height safety gate of the station was put into use, which meant that all the stations of Line 1 and Guangzhou Metro are equipped with shielded doors or half-height safety doors.

In September 2014, after the first installation of spray fans at the three elevated stations of Line 6 was so effective that the metro company decided to install 207 spray fans at the existing 12 at-grade/elevated stations (including this station). At present, the spray fan located at the platform of this station has been installed in place.

=== Line 10 ===
Construction of the main structure of the Line 10 station started in April 2022. Construction of the outer main structure of the station was completed in July 2022, and the roof slab was sealed in July 2023.

During the construction of the Line 10 station, it was necessary to use the original Exits/Entrances A, B and J and the transfer passage between Line 1 and Guangfo line. On 14 January 2022, the old Exits A and B were officially closed and relocated and Exit J and the original transfer passage were also closed one after another to coincide with the construction of the Line 10 station. The temporary transfer passage between Line 1 and the Guangfo Line was opened on 22 March 2022.

On 31 March 2025, the Line 10 station completed the "three rights" transfer. On 29 June the same year, the station body of Line 10 and the new transfer passage officially opened, and at the same time, the temporary transfer passage was closed.

=== Line 22 ===
The roof slab of the Line 22 station was sealed in June 2024. In October 2025, the Line 22 station completed the "three rights" transfer. On 29 December 2025, the Line 22 station officially opened, becoming the second four-line interchange station on the Guangzhou Metro network, and the first four-line interchange station completely within Guangzhou Metro.

=== Guangfo line ===
In 2007, construction began at various stations along the Guangfo line. On 23 April 2009, during construction of the section from the station to Jushu, the ground subsidence occurred near the Science and Technology Museum of the Pearl River Fisheries Research Institute on Xingyu Road, Xilang. On 28 and 29 October 2010, it was opened to some citizens of the two cities for trial rides. At 14:00 on 3 November of the same year, the Guangfo line section of the station was opened together with the entire Guangfo Metro, and the station officially became an interchange station.

In the early days of the initial opening of the Guangfo line, there were three escalators and a set of stairs and wheelchair lifts between the Line 1 station and the Guangfo line station, and there were ramps and stairs in the underground passage to connect to the southwest corner of the Guangfo line concourse. Due to the construction needs of Line 10, the old transfer passage was closed on 22 March 2022 and a temporary transfer passage was opened, which connects the northeast corner of the Line 1 concourse on the second above ground floor and the northwest corner of the Guangfo line concourse on the first underground floor. The above ground to underground Guangfo line transfer makes use of the original existing stairs and elevators at Exit J, and a set of stairs are added to separate the two-way passenger flow. After the opening of the Line 10 station, the new transfer passage was put into service, and the original temporary transfer passage was deactivated.

=== Station name change ===
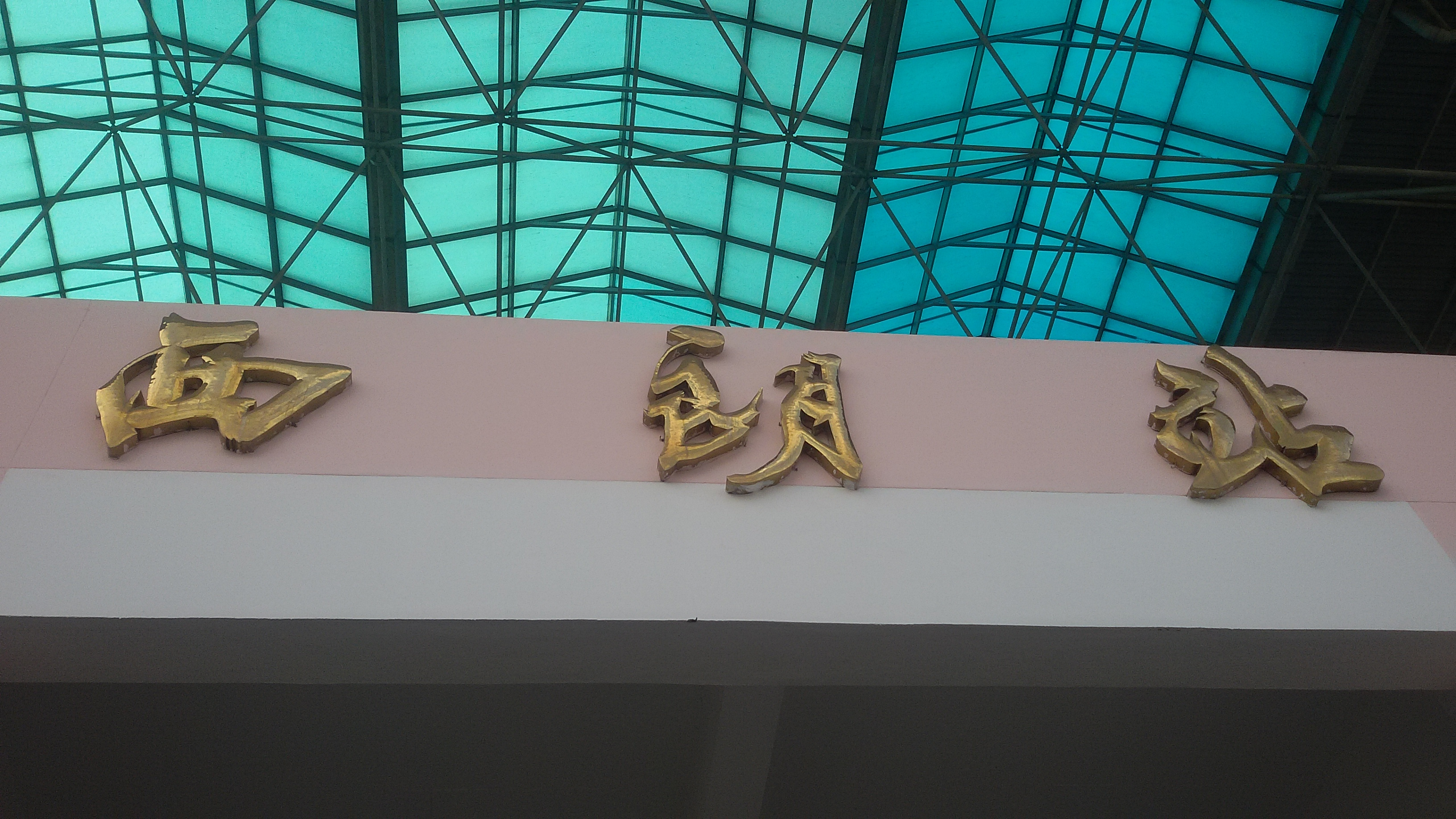
Golden character station sign before name change

Although this site is located in Xilang, Fangcun, Liwan District, since there was no "塱" character in the computer font at that time, the homophone "lang" (朗) was used (both characters are "lǎng" in Chinese pinyin, and long^{5} in Cantonese spelling). This character has now been added to the character library (Unicode U+5871).

In 2011, a local villager called the hotline of the mayor of Guangzhou and asked Su Zequn, then deputy mayor, to change the name, and related issues began to attract public attention. At the time, the metro company said that it would cost 10 million yuan to change the name and not change it to save costs, but many local municipal facilities had already been renamed. It was not until the end of the first quarter of 2018 that Guangzhou Metro formally applied to the Guangzhou Civil Affairs Bureau to rename the Chinese character name of the station as Xilang Station (西塱站). Guangzhou Metro announced on 10 August the same year that it would officially change the name of the station when the new lines open at the end of the year, and from September, the content of the passenger interface such as the station image sign column, 500-meter guide column, line network map, and ticketing equipment will be replaced one after another. The Chinese characters "西塱" finally came into effect on 28 December the same year with the opening of the new lines.

=== Station closure due to COVID restrictions ===
During COVID-19 pandemic control rules from 29 May to 24 June 2021, the station's services had been largely restricted, as from 29 May the station only allowed exiting, and from 7 June all entrances/exits effectively closed, which meant that passengers couldn't embark or disembark at this station, and while the trains on both lines can still stop here, passengers can only transfer between both lines within the fare zone. All entrances have been reopened in the afternoon of 24 June.

== Future development ==
As an important four-line interchange hub, the existing Line 1 station and its depot cannot meet future needs, therefore it needed to be renovated and expanded on a large scale. According to the relevant planning scheme, the station will be gradually renovated while ensuring that the operation of the existing lines will not be affected.

After the completion of station works of Line 10, Line 22 and the new Line 1, the relevant track section from Kengkou to this station and the Xilang Depot will be converted to underground operation. The existing Line 1 station building will be demolished, and a transfer concourse will be built on the second underground floor of the original site, so as to integrate the Line 1/22 station and the Line 10 station and optimize the transfer conditions between the lines. The space vacated by the station, track, and depot space on ground level will be commercially developed into a comprehensive transportation hub integrating shopping malls, office buildings, and residential buildings, as well as green spaces.
