= Wong Tai Sin Temple (Guangzhou) =

Temple in Guangzhou, China

Coordinates: 23.096135°N 113.225668°E

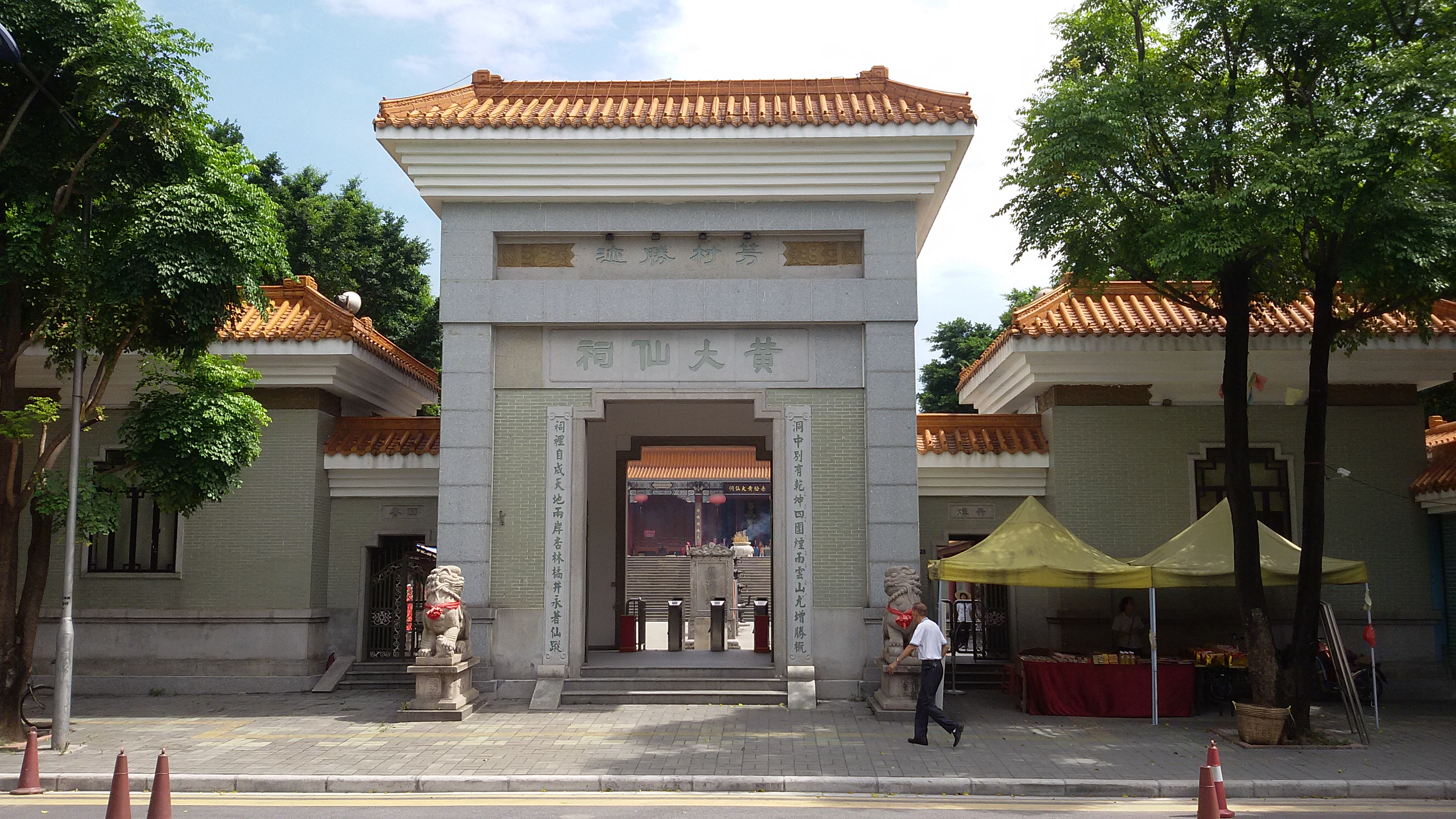
Wong Tai Sin Temple in Guangzhou

Wong Tai Sin Temple (simplified Chinese: 黄大仙祠; traditional Chinese: 黃大仙祠; pinyin: Huáng dàxiān cí; Jyutping: wong4 daai6 sin1 zi6*2) is a major tourist attraction dedicated to Chinese deity Wong Tai Sin. Situated in the Huadi Subdistrict, Liwan District of Guangzhou, it is a Taoist temple. It is just one of many temples dedicated to Wong Tai Sin. Besides, it can be found in different parts of the world, including China, Southeast Asia, and the United States, etc. Among them, the oldest one is in Jinhua City, Zhejiang Province, China.

== Wong Tai Sin ==
Wong Tai Sin is a Chinese deity popular in Jinhua, Zhejiang and Hong Kong with the power of healing. His name literally translates to the "Great Immortal Wong (Huang)". Wong Tai Sin is the divine form of the individual Huang Chuping or Wong Cho Ping (黃初平). was born in Zhejiang Province in A.D.328. From the age of 8 to 15, he herded sheep. Then he began to follow Taoism. According to the text Self-Description of Chisongzi (赤松子自述; "Master Red Pine") kept at the Wong Tai Sin Temple in Hong Kong, Wong Tai Sin was born Wong Cho Ping (Huang Chuping in Mandarin pinyin) in 338 in Lanxi, Jinhua, Zhejiang province. Western sources have him listed at c. 284 to 364 CE.

Wong Cho Ping is said to have experienced poverty and hunger, becoming a shepherd when he was eight years old. He began practising Taoism at the age of fifteen after meeting an immortal or saintly person on Red Pine Mountain in his hometown. Legend has it that he was able to transform stones into sheep forty years later. Wong Tai Sin later became known as the Red Pine Immortal (赤松仙子), after the mountain where he had his hermitage, and his birthday is celebrated on the 23rd of the eighth lunar month.

== History ==
1899 (Qing Dynasty): Guangzhou Wong Tai Sin Temple was established.

1904: Enthusiasts from all walks of life donated money to renovate the temple. Although the temple was in a remote area, it exerted a great influence on the people from Guangzhou City and Pearl River Delta Region. Wong Tai Sin Temple became one of the holy lands of religion in Guangzhou.

1910: The temple endured varied degrees of damage.

1940s: The temple was destroyed in Second Sino-Japanese War.

1997: Guangzhou Jiayou Tourism Development Co, LTD sponsored to reconstruct the temple. In November, it began the construction project.

From 1999: The temple was formally open for the public to visit. The reconstructed Guangzhou Wong Tai Sin Temple is in No.1 Guci Road, Fangcun District, right near Huadiwan Station of Guangzhou Metro. It covers an area of about 13,000 m2. It has received more than millions of people so far.

== Main sites ==
Wong Tai Sin Temple (Guangzhou) is a well known shrine and major tourist attraction. The temple still preserves valuable cultural relics from the original temple. Guangzhou Wong Tai Sin Temple is built in a modern style which gives people the impression of space. More specifically, the main body of the building, Wong Tai Sin Hall, is located on an invisible central axis, while the other halls and rest of the building spread out on either side of the axis. In the temple, there is a main shrine, Guandi Temple, Dou basking Temple, Temple Fortuna, Confuscius Temple, Lv Zu Hall, Punna Hall, and Guan Yin Hall. The whole design makes the temple appear to be more grand.

== Features ==
=== World's oldest wood ===
The plaques from the main shrine, the Guan Yin Hall, the Lvzu Hall have a history of more than 2200 years. They are precious antiques preserved in the temple. They are also among the oldest wood preserved in the world.

=== Mango trees ===
The former abbot planted many mango trees in the temple, some of which are more than 100 years old. The mango trees bear fruit every June to the delight of visitors.

=== Breakthrough in architectonics ===
A dragon pearl, weighing over 1000 kilograms, sits at the top roof of the main shrine. Only twelve giant pillars hold the main shrine, without any inside the temple. The shrine has a height of 22 metres. It can accommodate 3000 people at the same time. It is a breakthrough in modern architectonics.

=== Stone-carved couple ===
This stone-carved couple is from Guangxu of the Qing Dynasty, written by Chin-Shih (進士) Lu Weiqin from Panyu. It reads "洞中別有乾坤四圍煙雨雲山尤增勝概 祠裏自成天地兩岸桔林橘井永着仙踪". The couple mainly describes the splendid scenery in the temple. It has a rather high value in historical and literary study.

=== Other cultural relics ===
Guangzhou Wong Tai Sin Temple has preserved many precious cultural relics from the old temple, including stone lions, stone-carved couples, pillars of relief, and plaques.

== Operation ==
The temple is open from 7:00am to 5:30pm throughout the year, and runs overnight in the Lunar New Year Eve.

== See also ==
- Wong Tai Sin
- Wong Tai Sin Temple (Hong Kong)
