= Lingnan (disambiguation) =

Lingnan (岭南) is a geographic region in southern China.

Lingnan (simplified Chinese: 岭南; traditional Chinese: 嶺南; pinyin: Lǐngnán unless otherwise noted) may also refer to:

== Places in mainland China ==
- Lingnan, Guangxi, Heshan
- Lingnan Township, Anhui, Xiuning County
- Lingnan Township, Zhejiang, Shangyu
- Lingnan Subdistrict, Guangzhou, Liwan District
- Lingnan Subdistrict, Hegang, Xingshan District, Hegang, Heilongjiang
- Lingnan Subdistrict, Jinzhou, Taihe District, Jinzhou, Liaoning

== Schools ==
- Lingnan University, Tuen Mun, New Territories, Hong Kong
- Lingnan Secondary School, Heng Fa Chuen, Hong Kong
- Lingnan Primary School, at Stubbs Road, Hong Kong
- Lingnan University (Guangzhou), China, a former private university

== See also ==
- Lingnan culture, the culture of Guangdong
- Lingnan School, an art movement in the late Qing
- Ling Nam, a Filipino chain of Chinese restaurants, named for the region
- Lĩnh Nam, a ward in Hanoi, Vietnam
- Yeongnam (disambiguation)
