= Hedong station =

Guangfo Metro station in Guangzhou

Coordinates: 23°04′21″N 113°14′25″E

Hedong 鹤洞
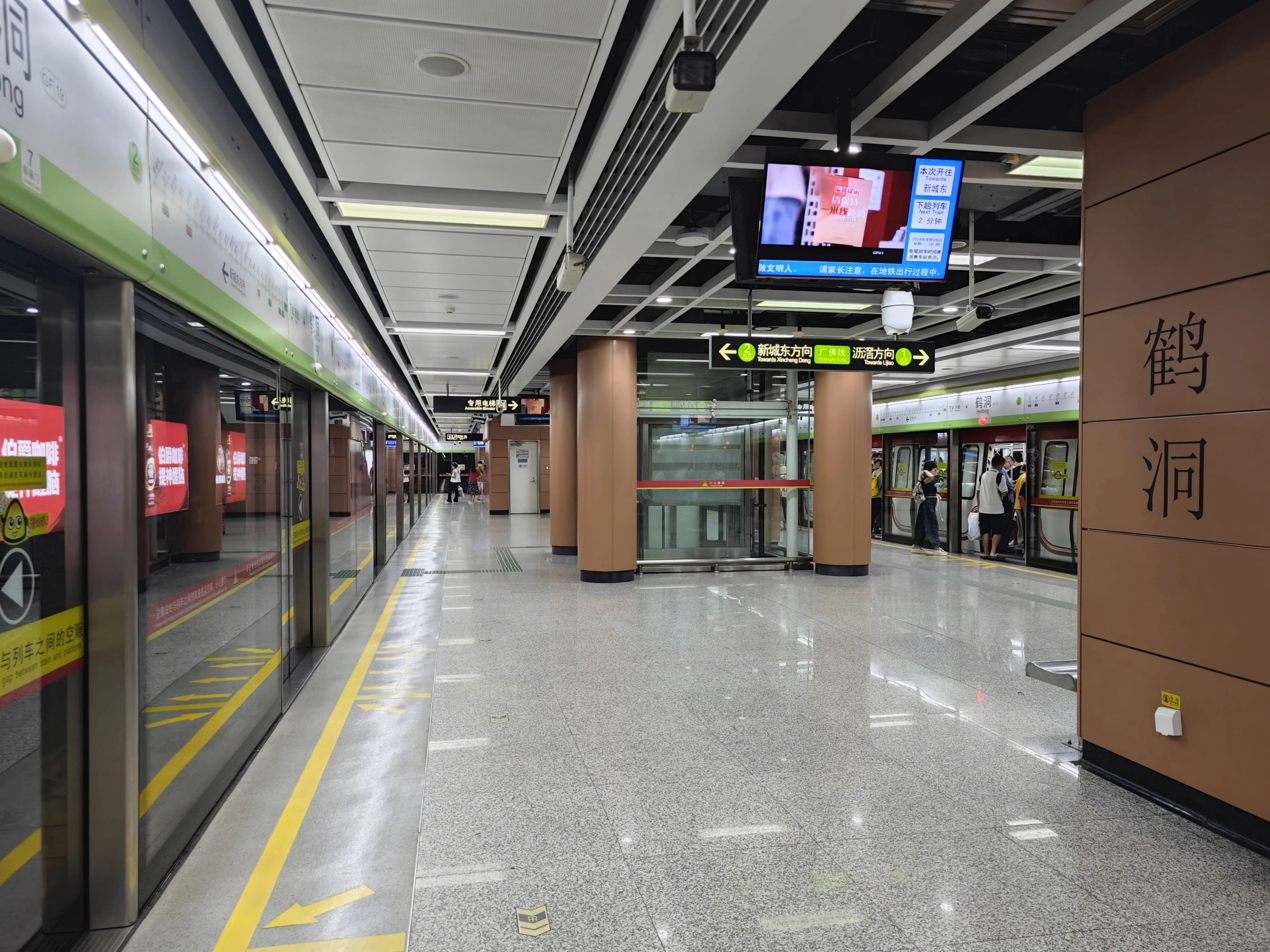
- Platforms

Chinese name
- Simplified Chinese: 鹤洞站
- Traditional Chinese: 鶴洞站
Transcriptions
Standard Mandarin
- Hanyu Pinyin: Hèdòng Zhàn
Yue: Cantonese
- Jyutping: hok^{6}dung^{6} zaam^{6}

General information
- Location: Liwan District, Guangzhou, Guangdong; China
- Operated by: Guangzhou Metro Co. Ltd.
- Line: Guangfo line
- Platforms: 2 (1 island platform)

Other information
- Station code: GF19

History
- Opened: 28 December 2015; 10 years ago

Services
Preceding station	Guangzhou Metro	Following station
Xilang towards Xincheng Dong	Guangfo line	Shachong towards Lijiao
Location

Hedong station (Chinese: 鹤洞站), formerly Baihedong station (白鹤洞站) during planning, is a station on Guangfo Line. It is located under Hedong Road (鹤洞路) in Fangcun, Liwan District, Guangzhou. It entered operation on 28 December 2015.

== Station layout ==
G	-	Exits
L1; Concourse	Lobby	Customer Service, Vending machines
L2; Platforms	Platform 2	Guangfo towards Xincheng Dong (Xilang)
L2; Platforms	Island platform, doors will open on the left
L2; Platforms	Platform 1	Guangfo towards Lijiao (Shachong)

== Exits ==
Exit number	Exit location
Exit B	Hedong Lu
Exit C	Hedong Lu
