= Shachong station =

Guangfo Metro and Guangzhou Metro Line 11 interchange station

Shachong 沙涌
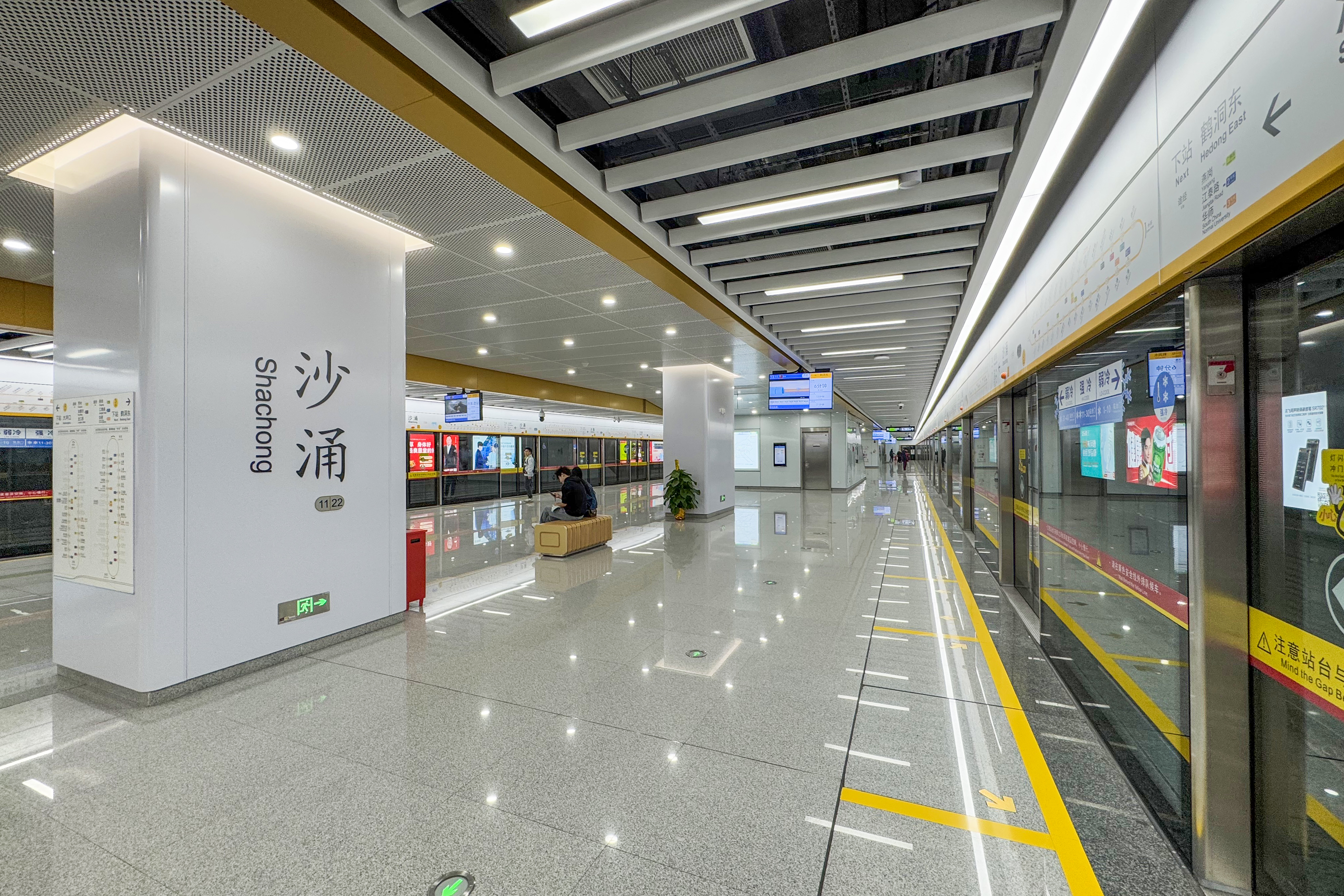
- Line 11 platform

Chinese name
- Chinese: 沙涌站
Transcriptions
Standard Mandarin
- Hanyu Pinyin: Shāchōng Zhàn
Yue: Cantonese
- Yale Romanization: Sāachūng Jaahm
- Jyutping: saa^{1}cung^{1} zaam^{6}

General information
- Location: West side of intersection of Huanhua Road (浣花路) and Fangcun Avenue East (芳村大道东), Chongkou Subdistrict; Liwan District, Guangzhou, Guangdong; China
- Coordinates: 23°5′9.46″N 113°14′28.90″E
- Operator: Guangzhou Metro Co. Ltd.
- Lines: Guangfo line; Line 11
- Platforms: 4 (2 island platforms)
- Tracks: 4

Construction
- Structure type: Underground
- Accessible: Yes

Other information
- Station code: 1122 GF20

History
- Opened: Guangfo line: 28 December 2015 (10 years ago); Line 11: 28 December 2024 (19 months ago)

Services
Preceding station	Guangzhou Metro	Following station
Hedong towards Xincheng Dong	Guangfo line	Shayuan towards Lijiao
Hedong East Outer Circle	Line 11	Dachongkou Inner Circle
Location

Shachong station (Chinese: 沙涌站; pinyin: Shāchōng Zhàn; Cantonese Yale: Sāachūng Jaahm), formerly Fangcun Dadao station (芳村大道站) when planning, is an interchange station between the Guangfo Metro (Guangfo line) and Line 11 of the Guangzhou Metro. It is located at the underground of the junction of Huanhua Road (浣花路) and Fangcun Avenue East (芳村大道东) in Fangcun, Liwan District, Guangzhou. It started operations on 28 December 2015. The Line 11 station opened on 28 December 2024.

== Station layout ==
G	-	Exits A-E
L1; Concourse	11 Lobby	Ticket Machines, Customer Service, Shops, Police Station, Security Facilities
L1; Concourse	Guangfo Lobby	Ticket Machines, Customer Service, Shops, Police Station, Security Facilities
L2; Mezzanine	Passenger flow distribution hall ( 11 )	Connection between concourse and platforms
L2; Mezzanine	Transfer passageway	Connection between Line 11 passenger flow distribution hall and Guangfo line platforms
L2; Mezzanine	Guangfo line Mezzanine	Station Equipment
L3; Platforms	Line 11 Mezzanine	Station Equipment
L3; Platforms	Platform 2	Guangfo towards Xincheng Dong (Hedong)
L3; Platforms	Island platform, doors will open on the left (Toilets)
L3; Platforms	Platform 1	Guangfo towards Lijiao (Shayuan)
L4 Platforms	Platform 4	11 Inner Circle (Dachongkou)
L4 Platforms	Island platform, doors will open on the left (Toilets, Nursery)
L4 Platforms	Platform 3	11 Outer Circle (Hedong East)

=== Entrances/exits ===
The station opened Exits A and C in its initial opening stage. Exit B was opened on 25 June 2019 and temporarily closed between 13 August 2022 and 27 December 2024 to accommodate the construction of the Line 11 station. Exit B was expanded by connecting to the Line 11 station, and after the canopy of the exit was rebuilt it was reopened when Line 11 opened. At the same time, after the opening of the station of Line 11, new exits D and E were added.

==== Line 11 concourse ====
- D: Fangcun Avenue East
- E: Fangcun Avenue East

==== Guangfo line concourse ====
- A: Huanhua Road, Guangzhou True Light Middle School
- B: Fangcun Avenue East
- C: Huanhua Road

Exit C is equipped with a stairlift, and Exit D is equipped with an elevator.

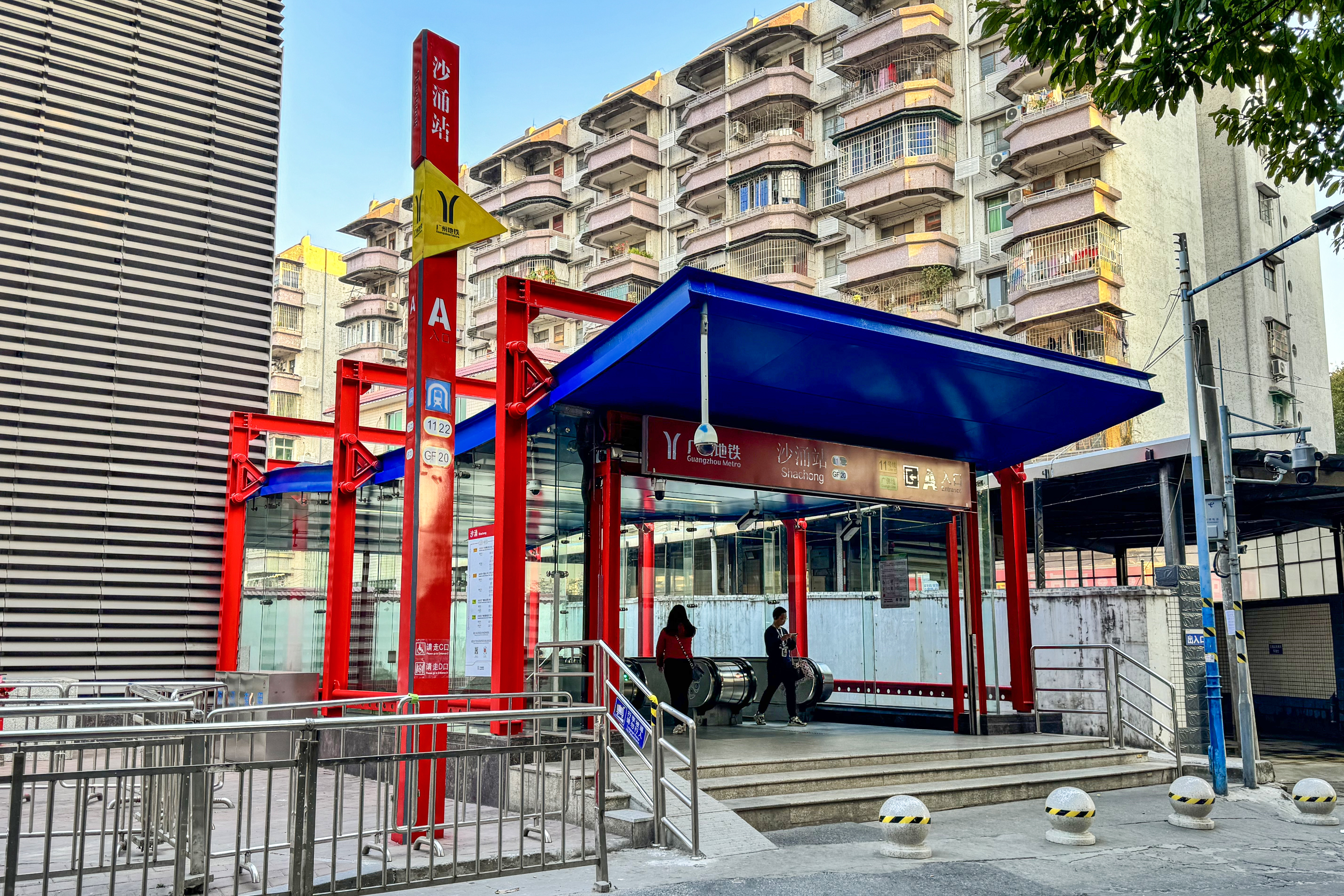
Entrance A

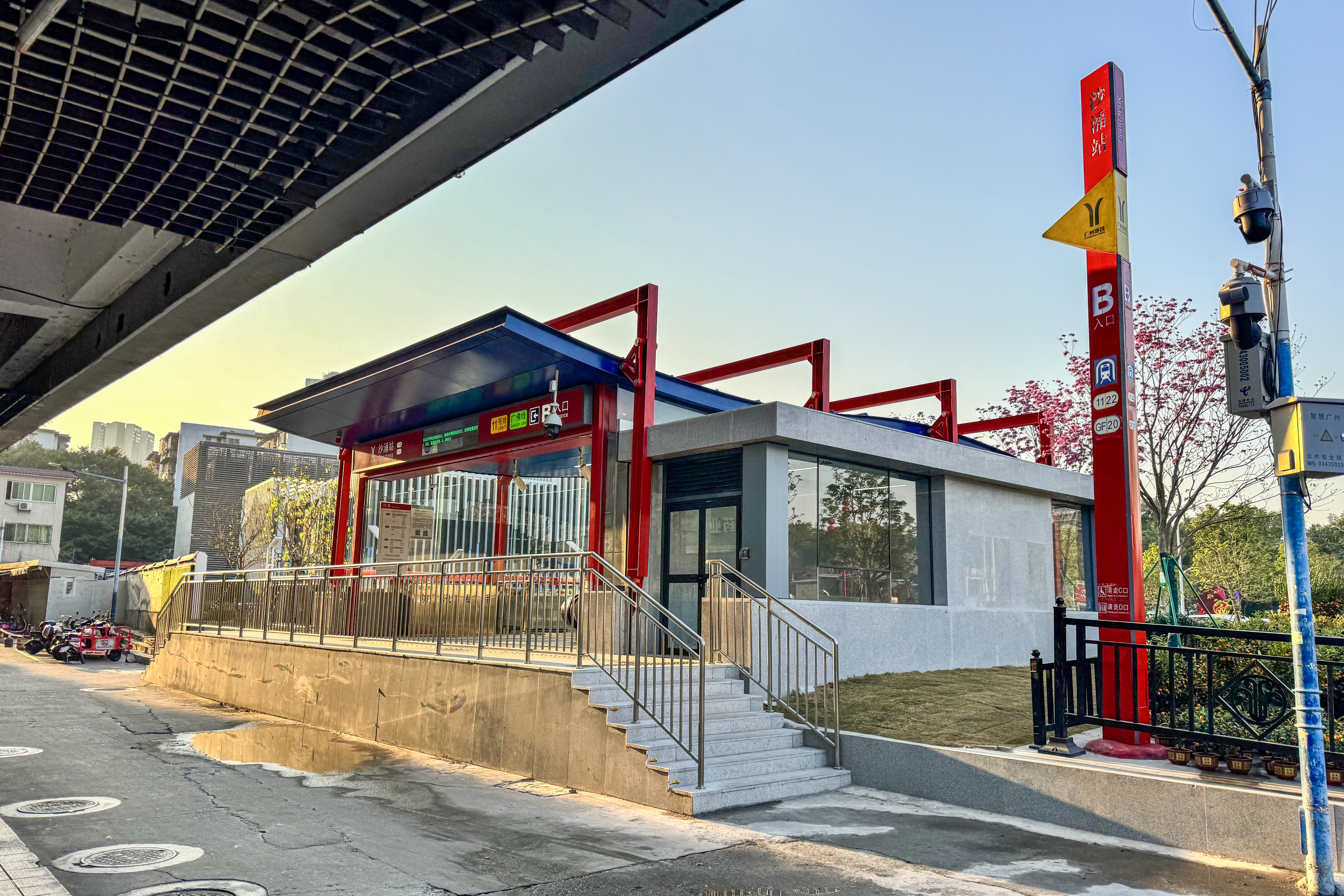
Entrance B

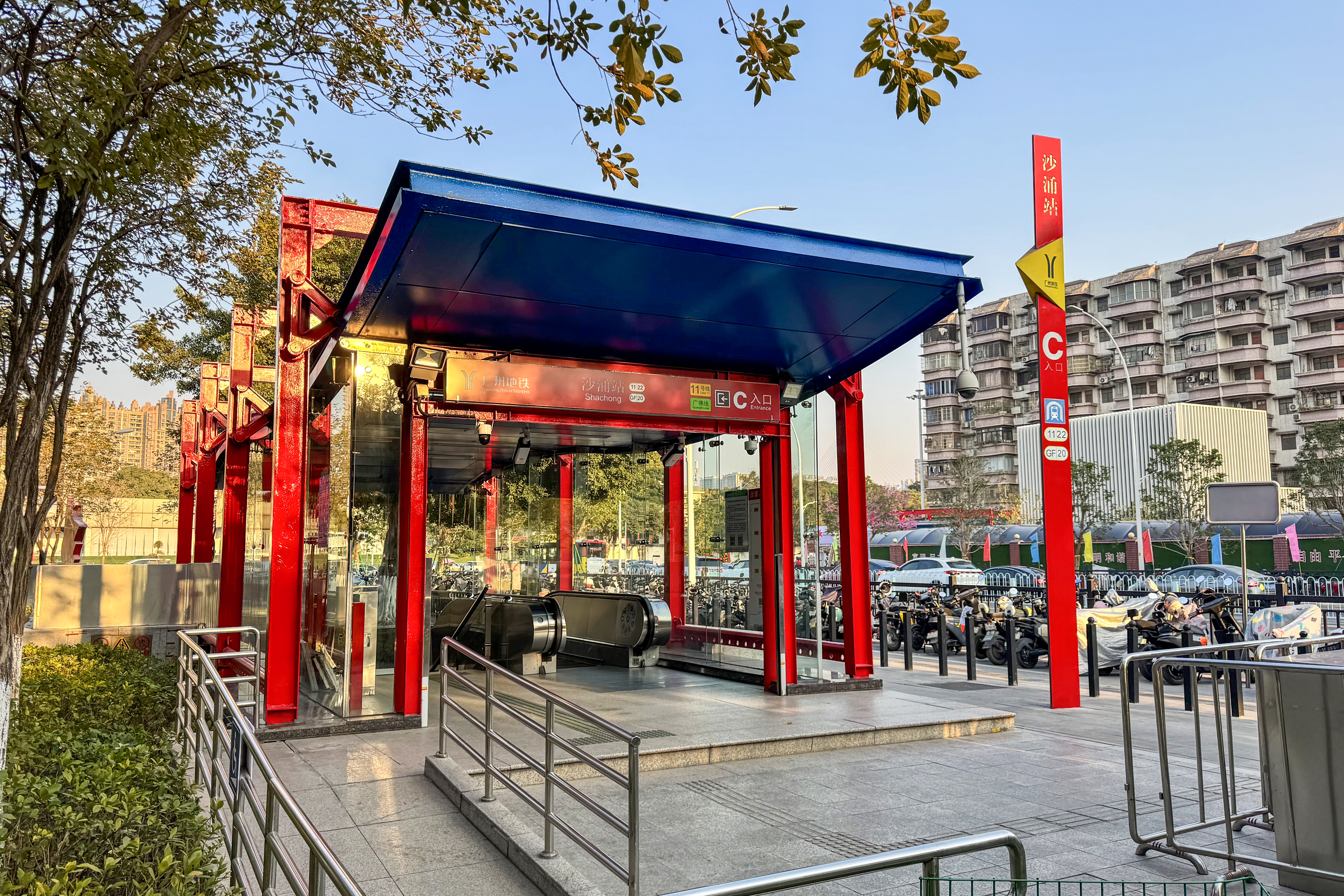
Entrance C

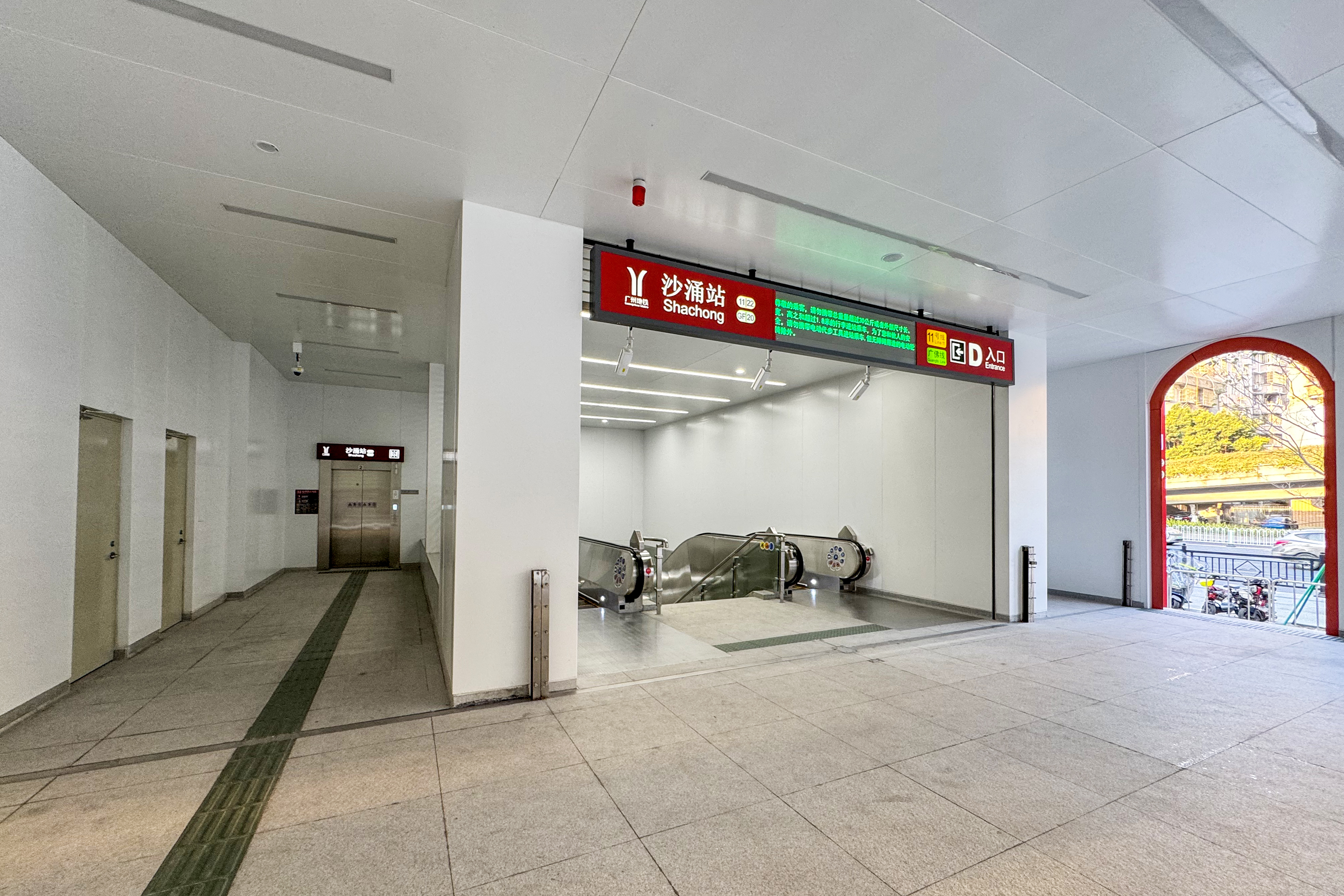
Entrance D

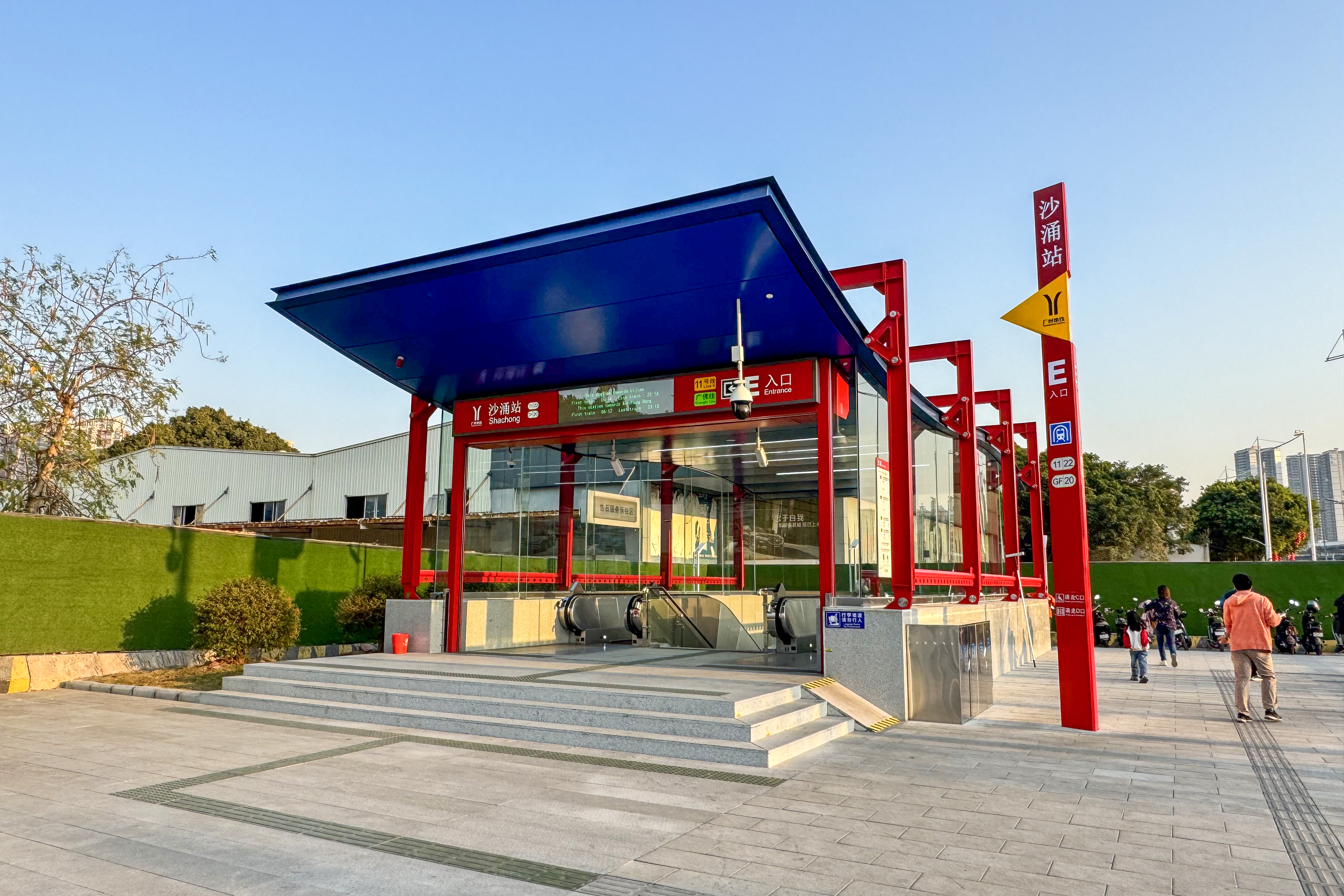
Entrance E

== Gallery ==
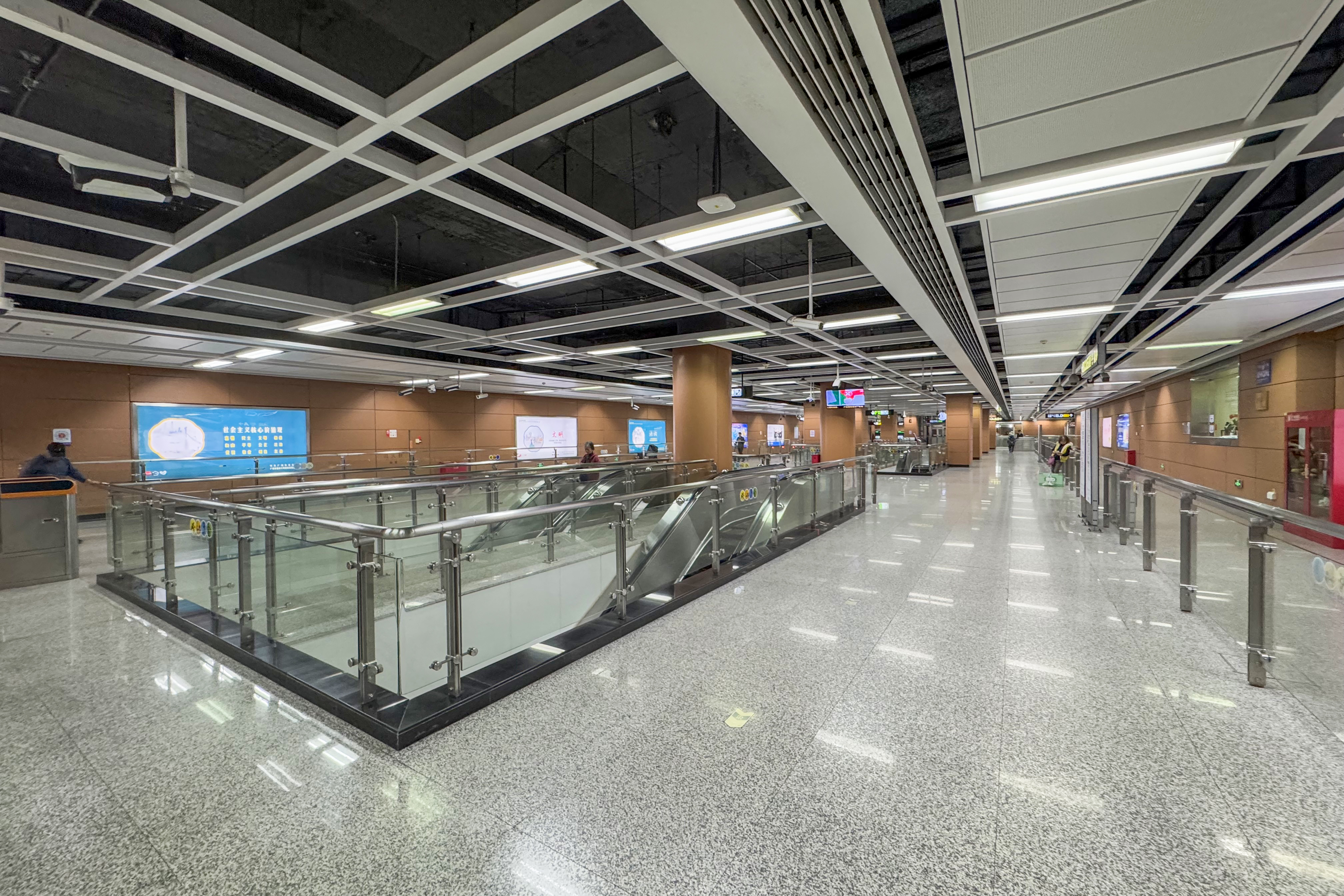
Guangfo line concourse

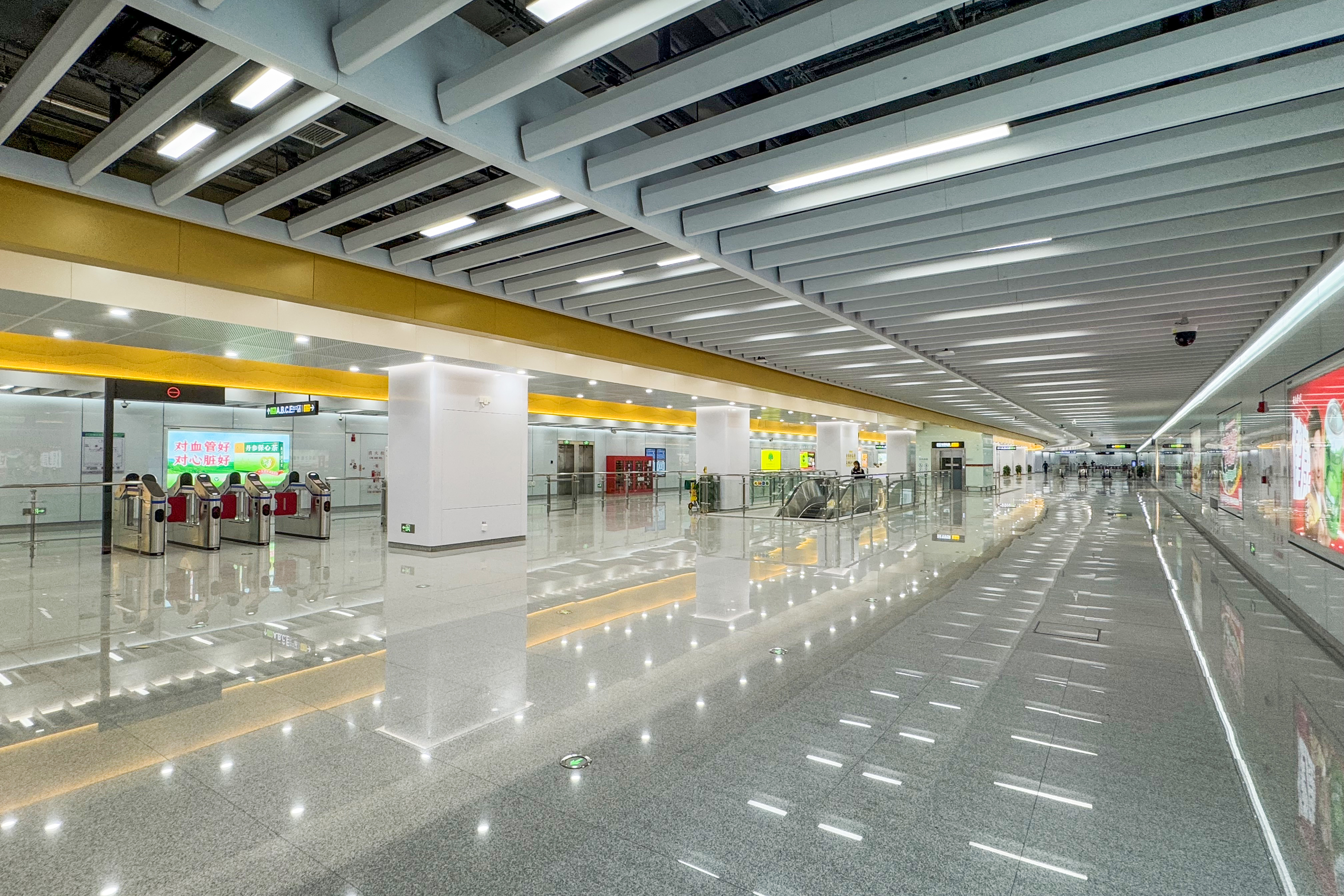
Line 11 concourse

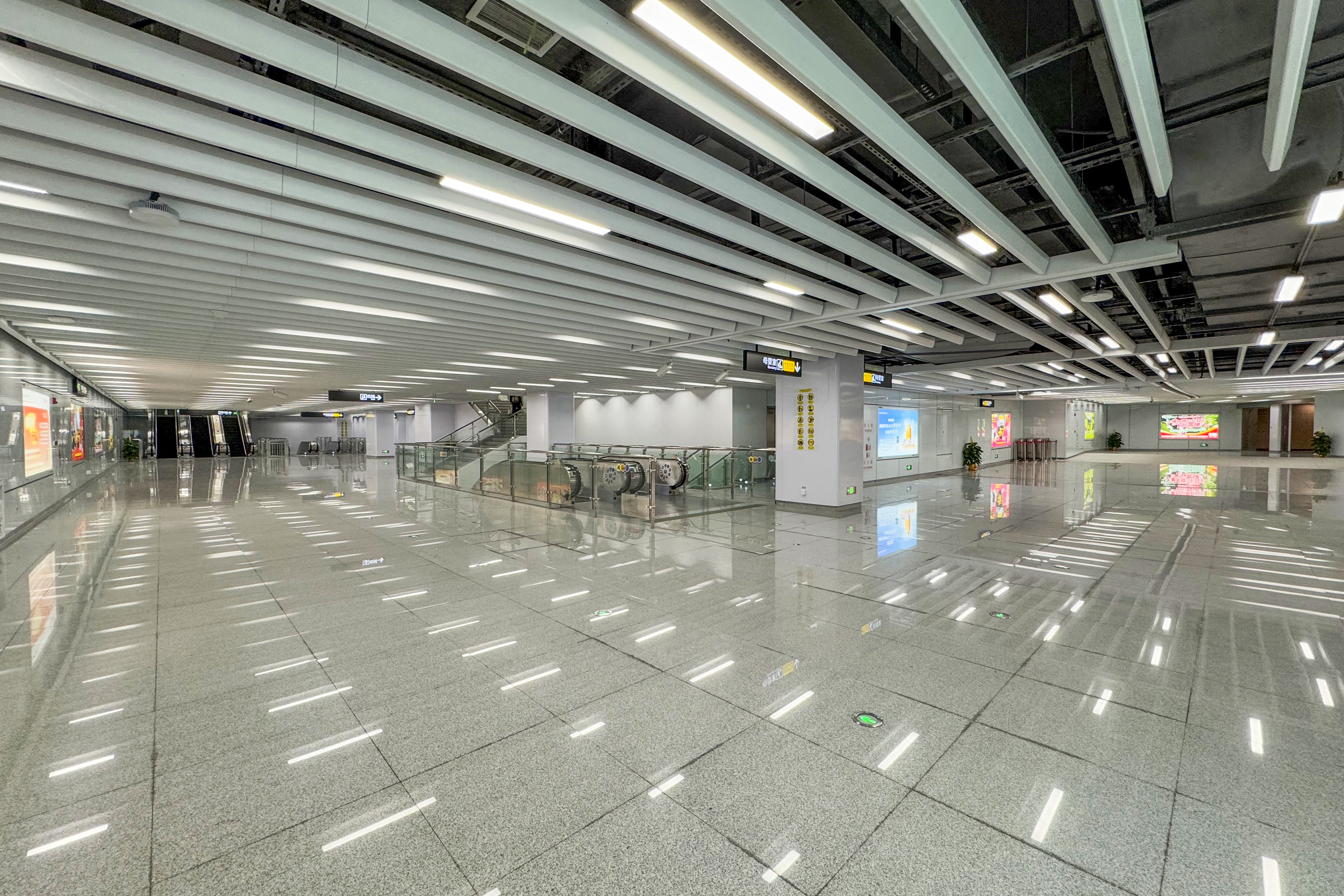
Line 11 passenger flow distribution hall

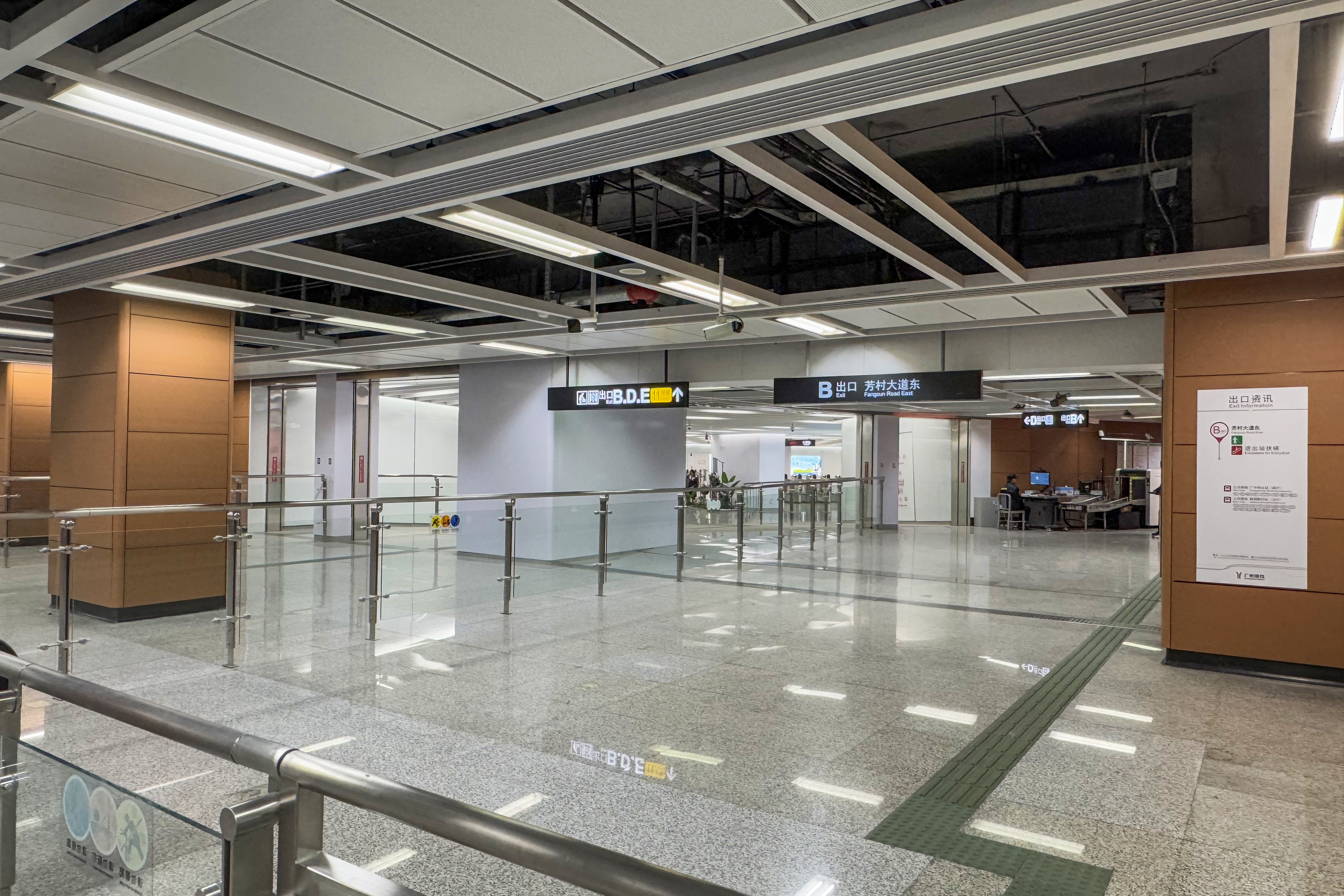
Transfer passage node from Guangfo line to Line 11

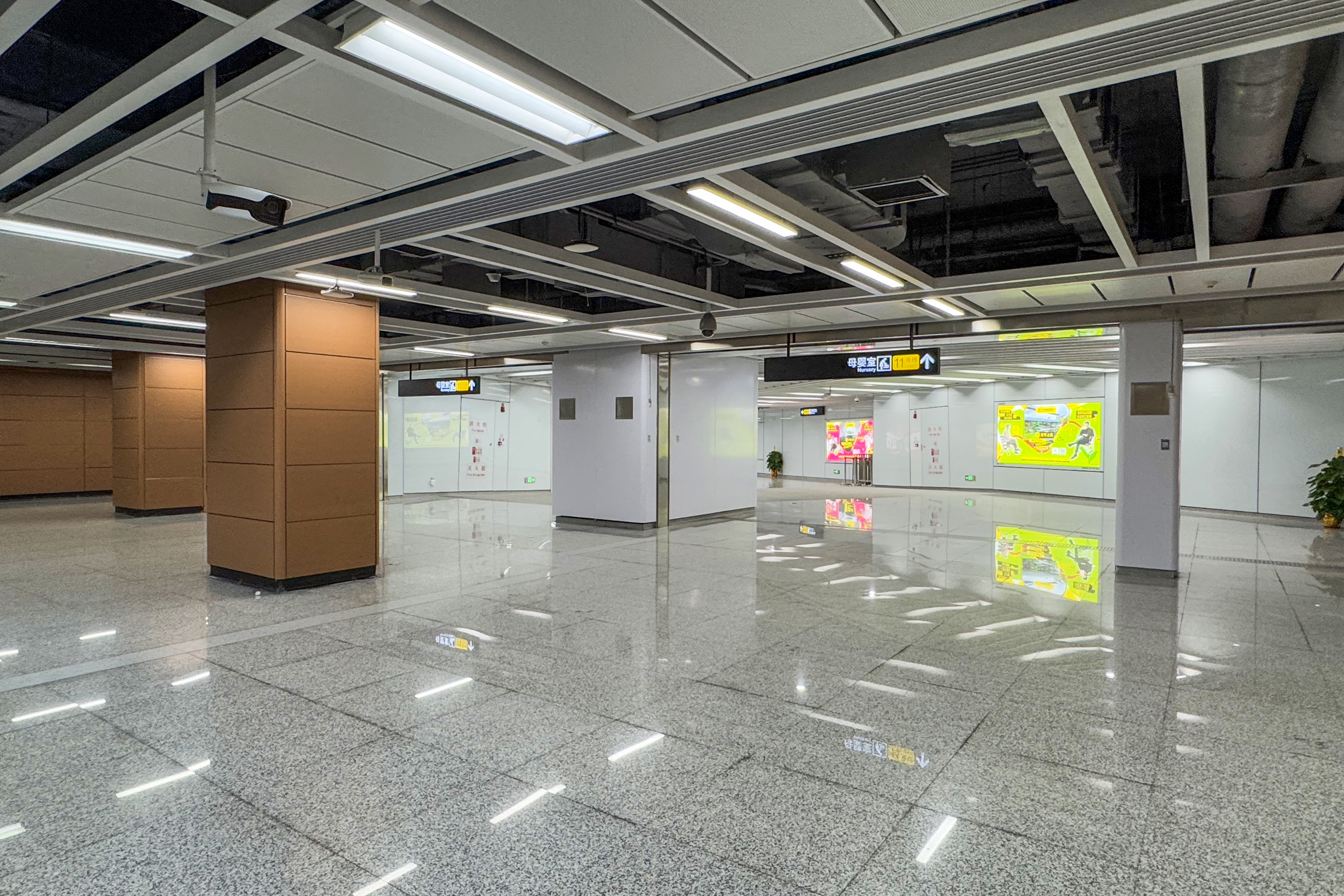
Basement 2 level transfer node from Guangfo line to Line 11

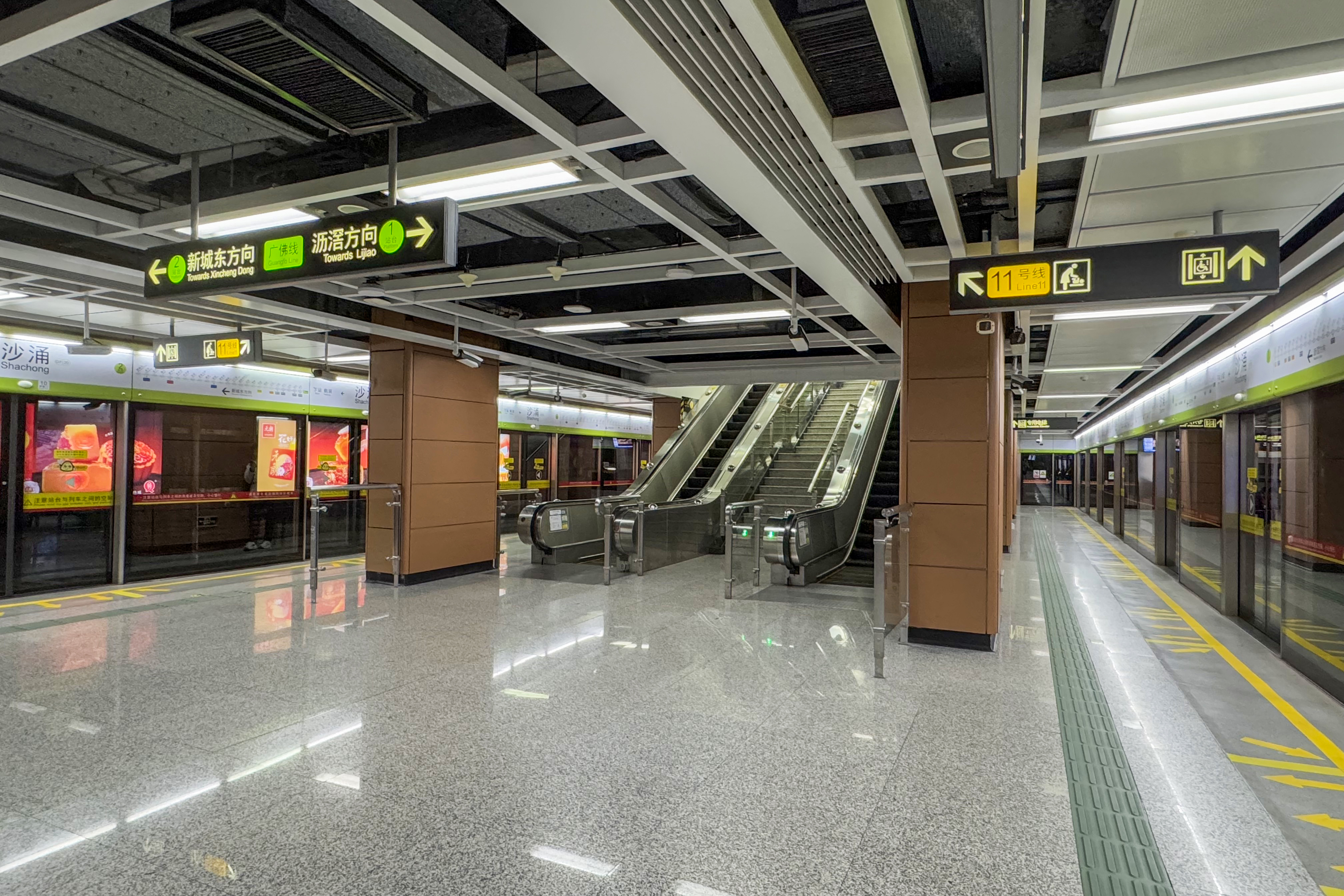
Transfer escalators and stairs for Guangfo line platforms

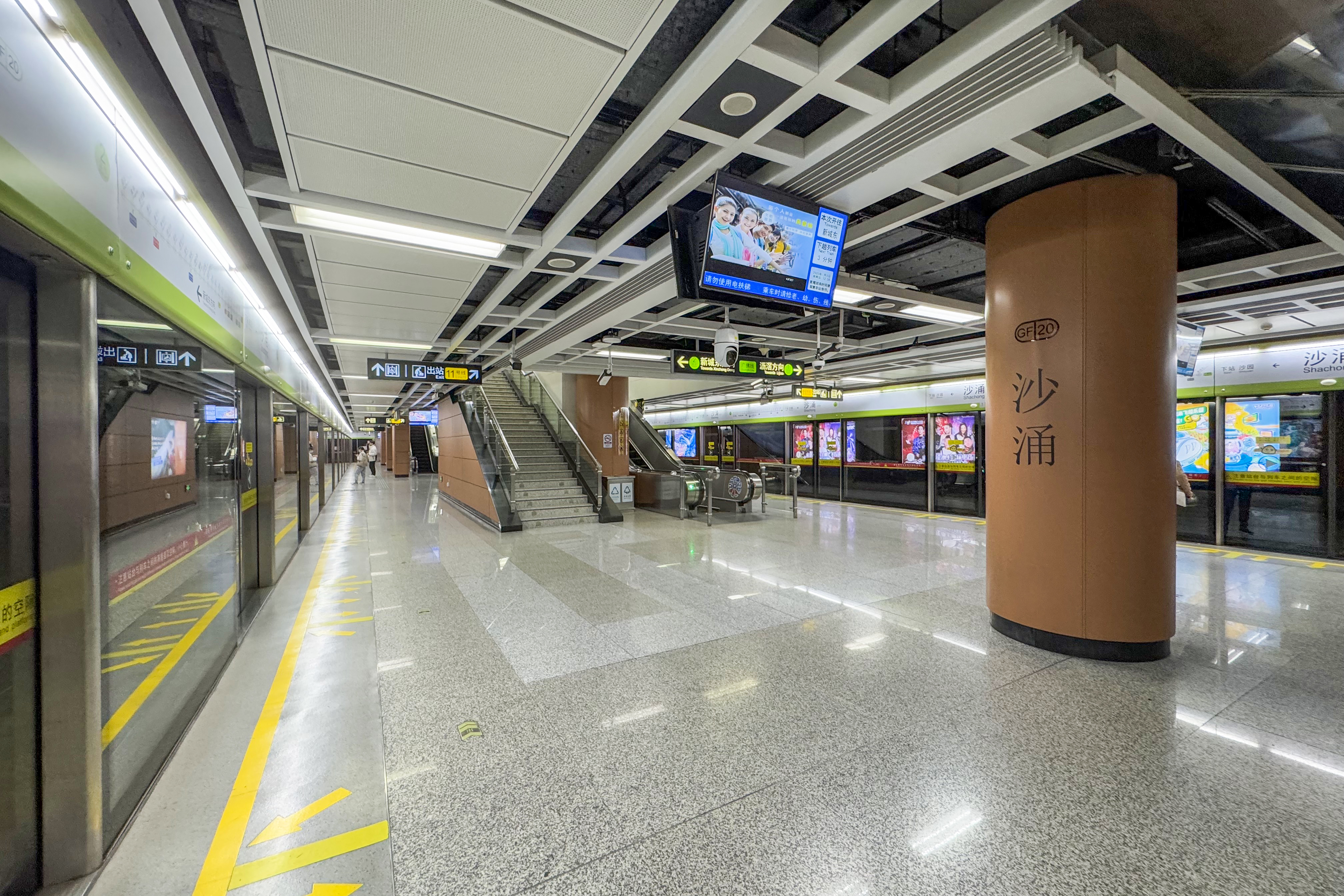
Guangfo line platform

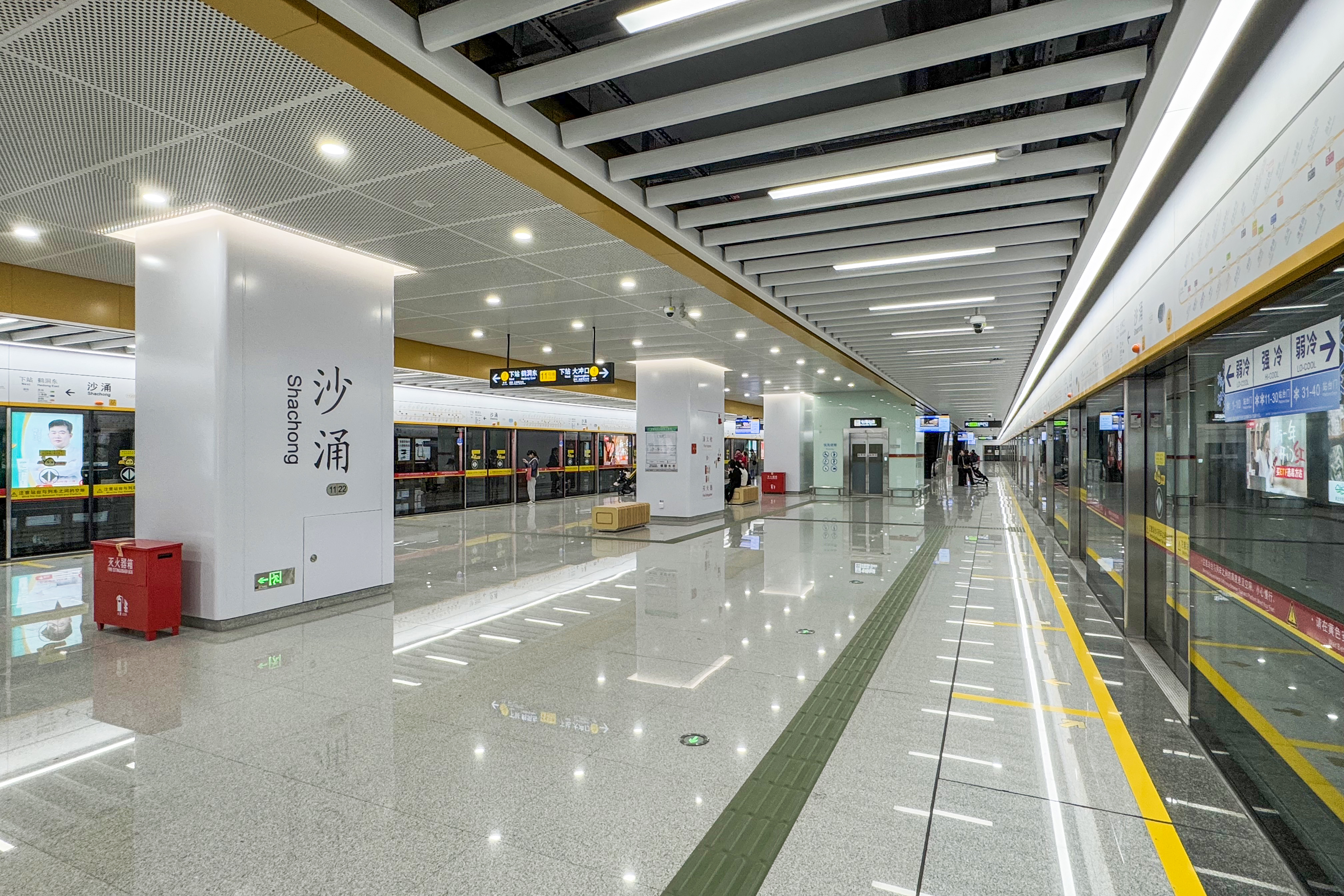
Line 11 platform

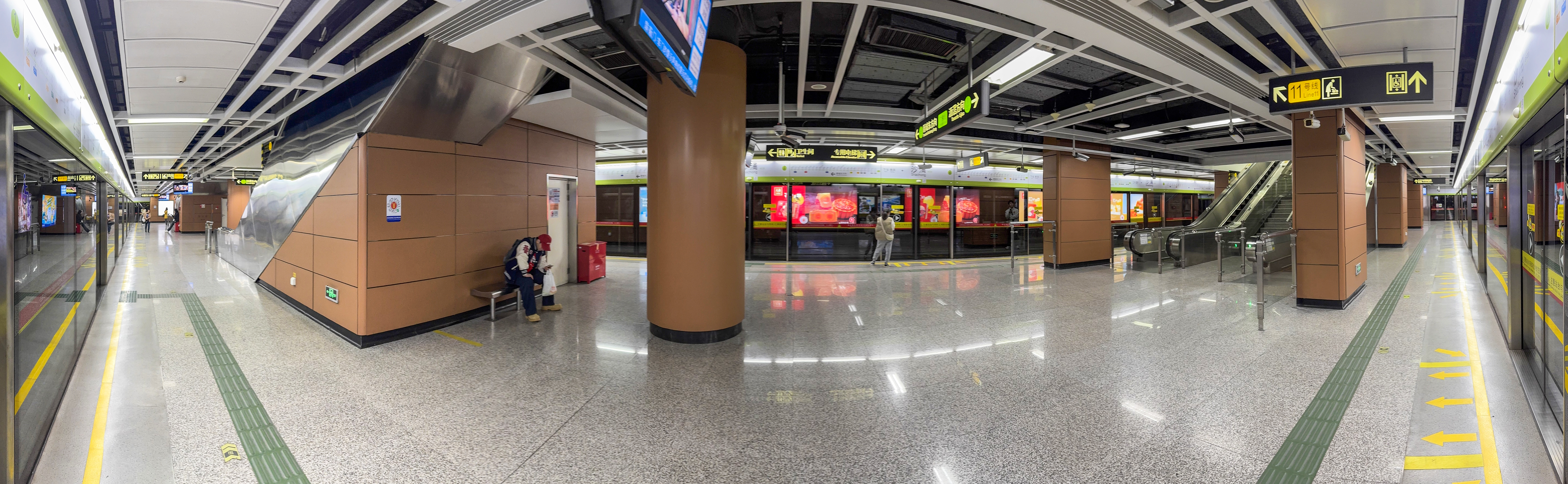
Guangfo line platform panorama

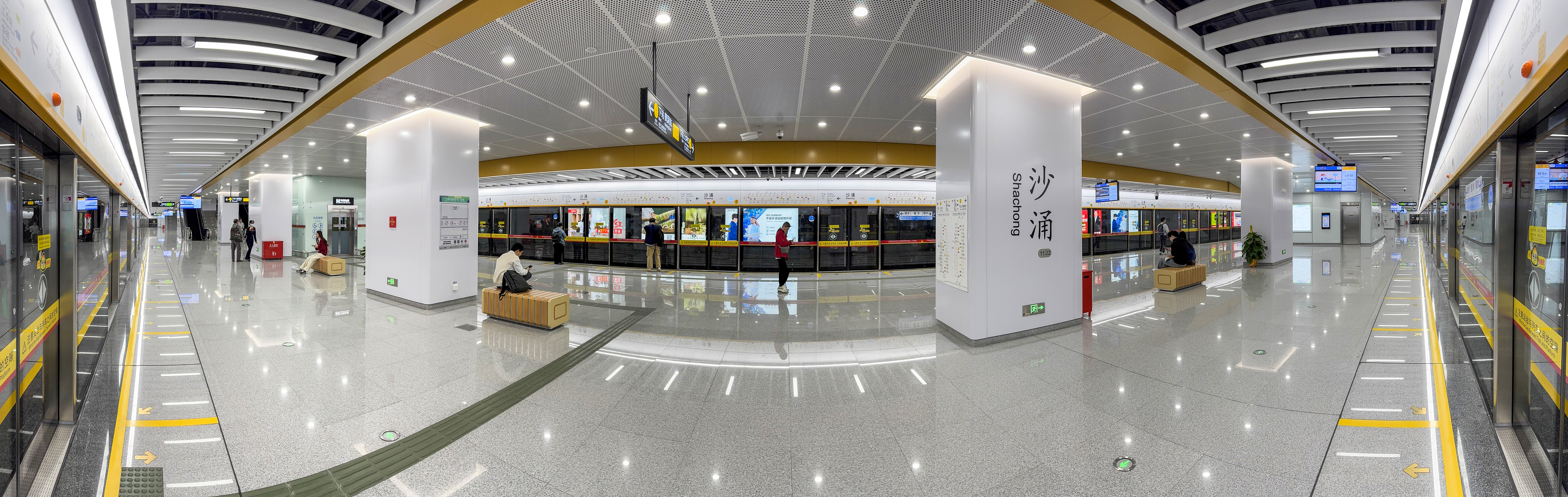
Line 11 platform panorama

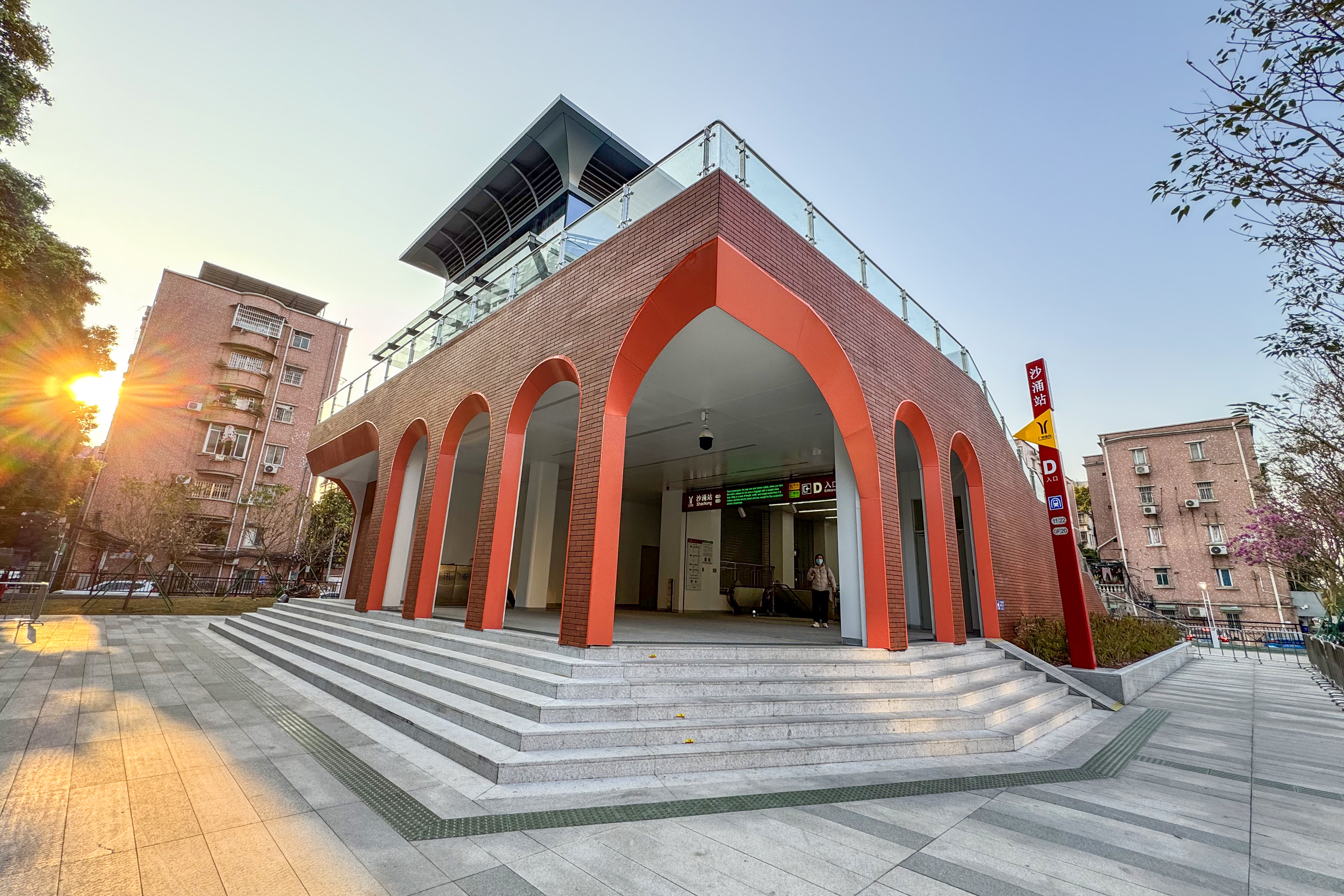
Exit D with commercial space above

== History ==
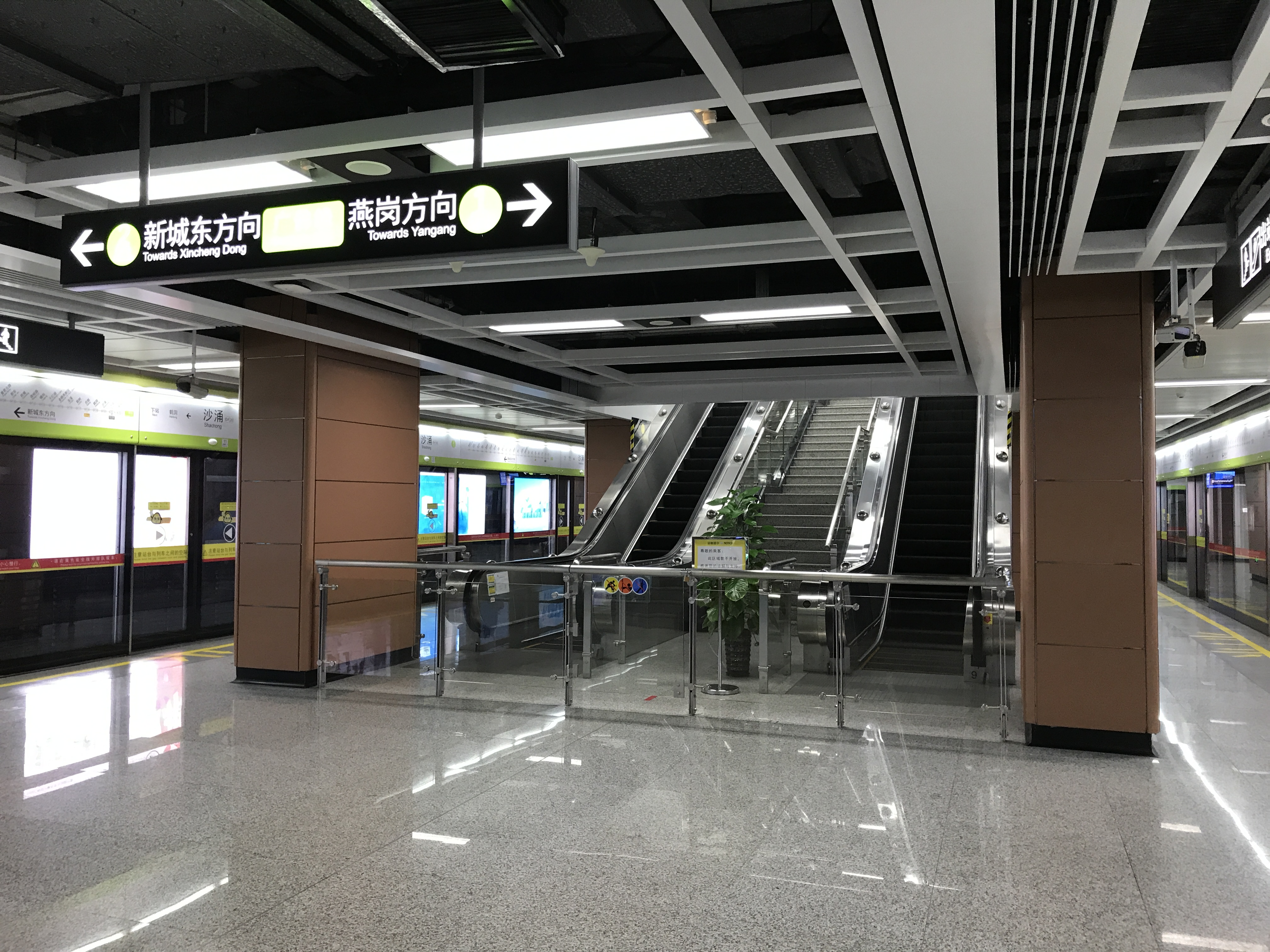
Reserved transfer interface to Line 11 platforms at the eastern side of Guangfo line platforms (2017)

=== Planning and construction ===
In the 2003 plan, the station was planned as one of the stations of the Guangzhou-Foshan Metro (Guangfo Metro), and Fangcun Dadao station was used as the station during the planning and construction of the project. In the original plan, the station was located in the north-northwest area of its current location, but it was later changed to be located next to the stream near the intersection of Huanhua Road and Fangcun Avenue.

In 2011, in response to the planning of a Line 11 station at Shachong, the Guangfo line Station was redesigned, the station was widened, and part of the structure was planned as a transfer passageway on the second floor to make good use of the station space.

The construction of the Guangfo line station started on 24 September 2009, and the main structure was topped out on 14 January 2013. On 14 May 2017, the station site of Line 11 was enclosed together with Fangcun Avenue East Station (now Dachongkou), and construction of the envelope structure was completed in May 2020. The "three rights" transfer was completed on 3 July 2024.

In order to facilitate the connection to the station part of Line 11, on the eve of the opening of Line 11, the north part of the paid area of the Guangfo line concourse was redivided, the number and location of the turnstiles at the interface connecting to the Line 11 station were adjusted, and the elevators originally divided into the connecting platforms outside the paid area were included in the paid area.

=== Operation ===
On 28 December 2015, the station opened on the Guangfo line.

On 28 December 2024, the Line 11 station was opened.
