= Yeongnam (disambiguation) =

Yeongnam (영남) or Ryŏngnam is a region of Korea, whose name literally means "south of the passes".

Yeongnam (Korean: 영남) may also refer to:

- Young-nam (영남, also Yeung-nam, Yeong-nam, Yong-nam), a Korean given name
- Yeungnam High School, a school established in 1935 in Daegu, South Korea
- Yeungnam University, a private research university
- Youngnam Theological University and Seminary

== See also ==
- Lingnan (disambiguation)
- Yong-nam (용남), a Korean given name
