= Dachongkou station =

Guangzhou Metro Line 11 station

Dachongkou 大冲口
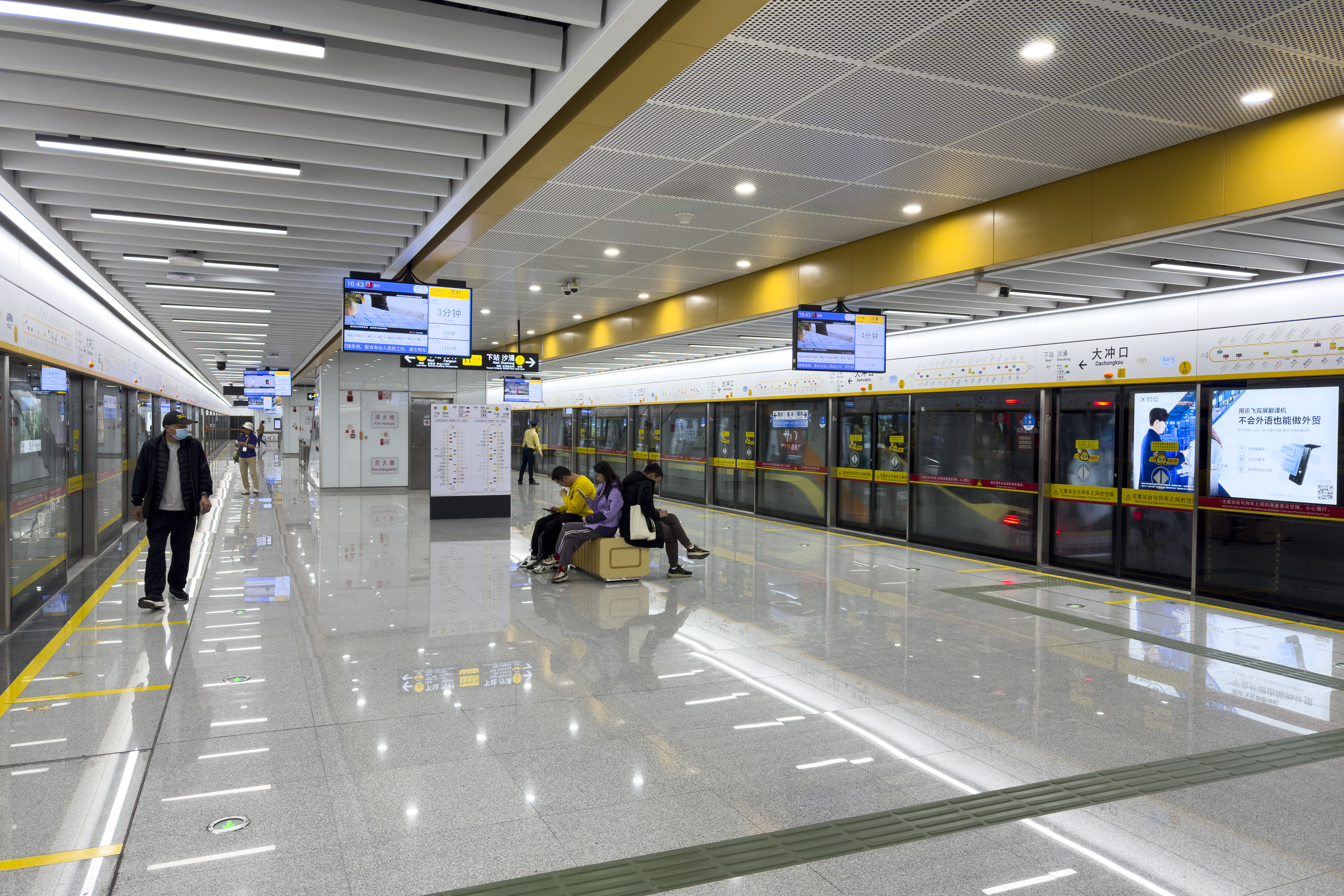
- Platform

Chinese name
- Chinese: 大冲口站
Transcriptions
Standard Mandarin
- Hanyu Pinyin: Dàchōngkǒu Zhàn
Yue: Cantonese
- Yale Romanization: Dǎaichūngháu Jaahm
- Jyutping: Daai^{6}cung^{1}hau^{2} Zaam^{6}

General information
- Location: North of the intersection of Fangcun Avenue (芳村大道) and Xingfa Main Street (杏花大街), Chongkou Subdistrict; Liwan District, Guangzhou, Guangdong; China
- Coordinates: 23°5′30.84″N 113°14′21.01″E
- Operator: Guangzhou Metro Co. Ltd.
- Line: Line 11
- Platforms: 2 (1 island platform)
- Tracks: 2

Construction
- Structure type: Underground
- Accessible: Yes

Other information
- Station code: 1121

History
- Opened: 28 December 2024 (19 months ago)
- Former names: Fangcun Avenue East (芳村大道东)

Services
Preceding station	Guangzhou Metro	Following station
Shachong Outer Circle	Line 11	Fangcun Inner Circle
Location

Dachongkou Station (Chinese: 大冲口站; pinyin: Dàchōngkǒu Zhàn; Cantonese Yale: Dǎaichūngháu Jaahm) is a station on Line 11 of the Guangzhou Metro. It started operations on 28 December 2024. It is located underground at the north of the intersection of Fangcun Avenue and Xingfa Main Street in Liwan District.

== Structure ==
In order to reduce the impact on ground transportation and the surrounding old houses, the construction of the station was carried out by the method of full cover and excavation.

== Station Layout ==
G	-	Exits A, B, C, D
L1	Lobby	Ticket Machines, Customer Service, Shops, Police Station, Security Facilities
L2	Mezzanine	Station Equipment
L3; Platforms	Platform 2	11 Inner Circle (Fangcun)
L3; Platforms	Island platform, doors will open on the left (Toilets, Nursery)
L3; Platforms	Platform 1	11 Outer Circle (Shachong)

=== Entrances/exits ===
The station has 4 points of entry/exit. Exit A is equipped with an elevator.

- A: Fangcun Avenue East
- B: Fangcun Avenue East
- C: Fangcun Avenue East
- D: Fangcun Avenue East
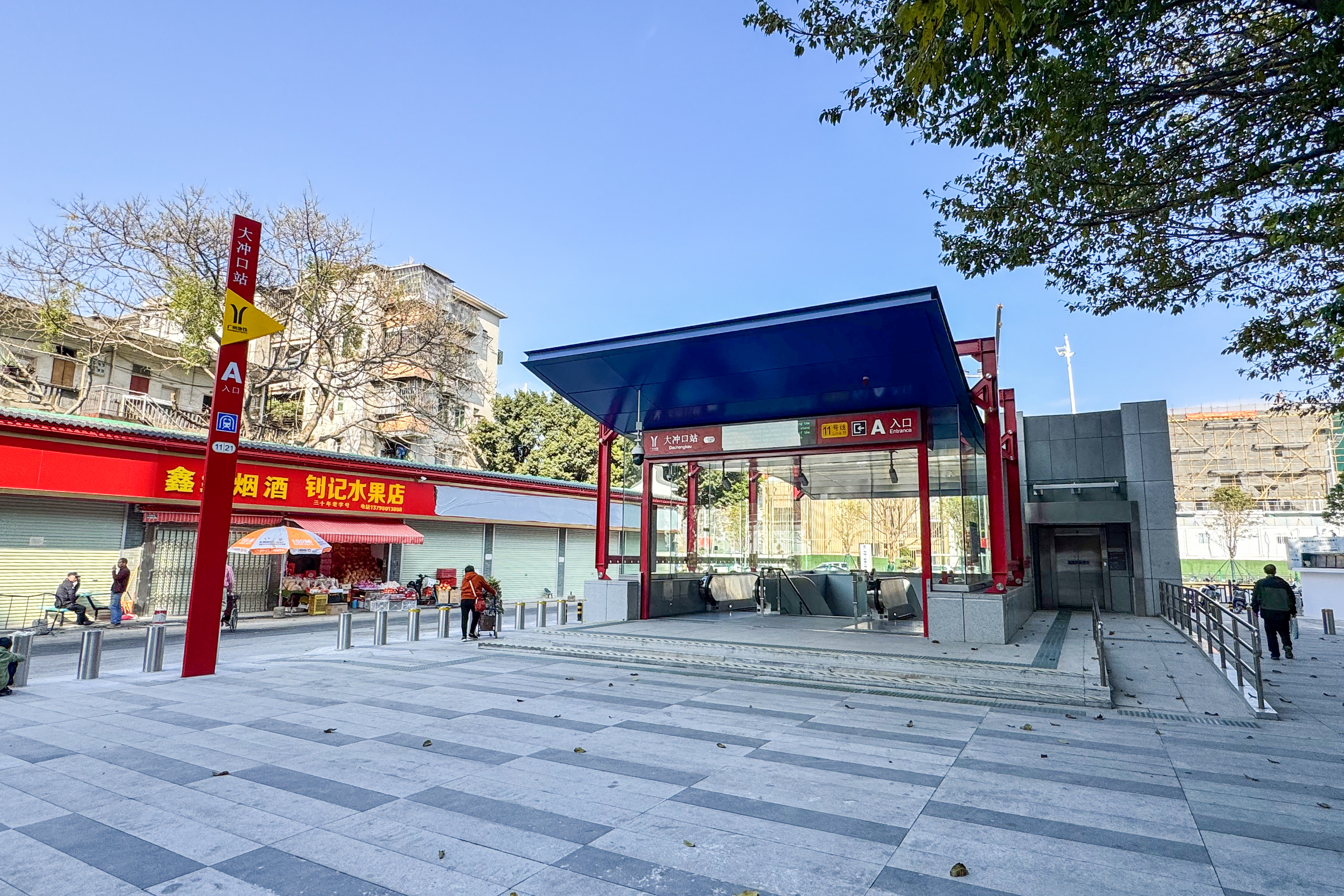
Entrance A

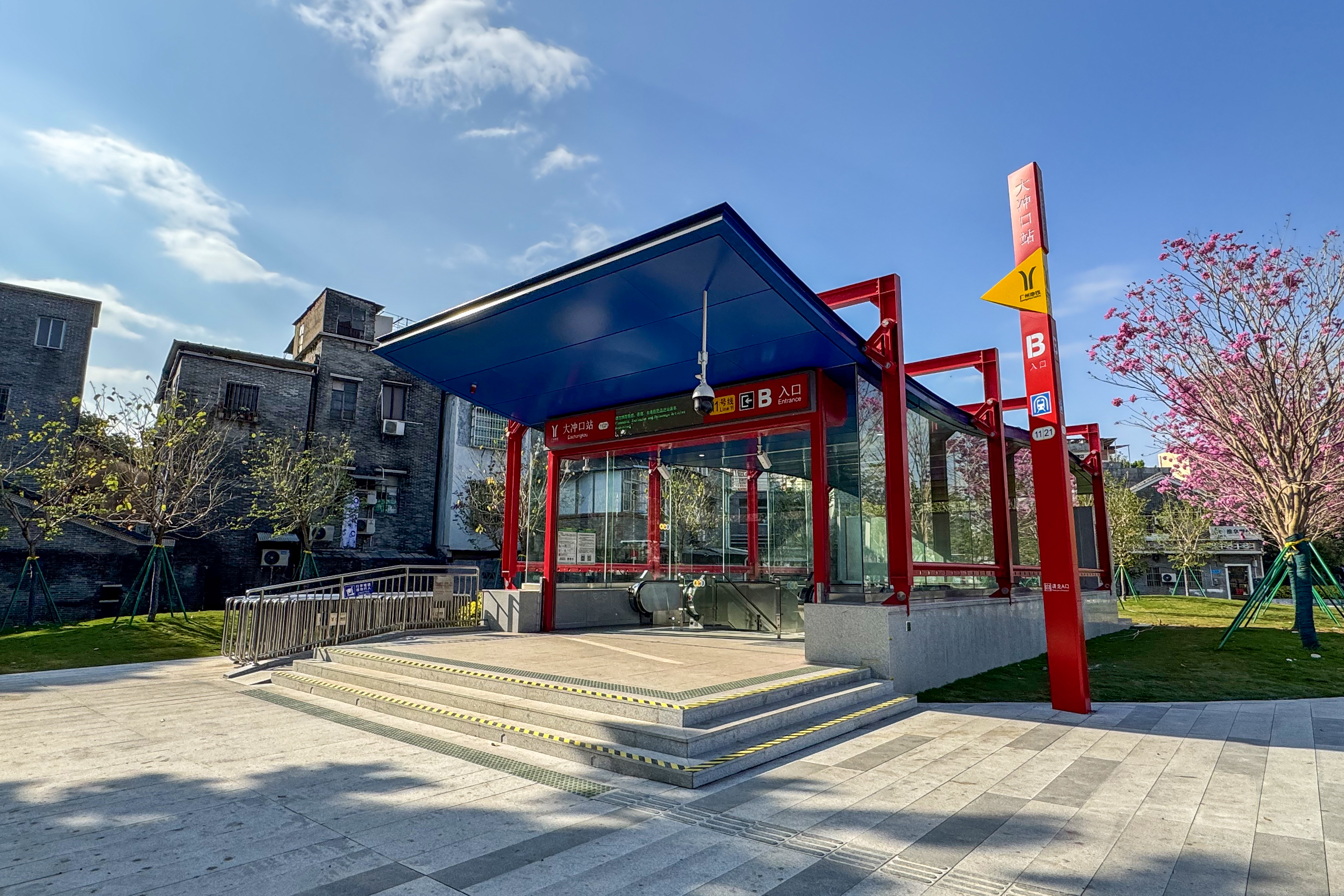
Entrance B

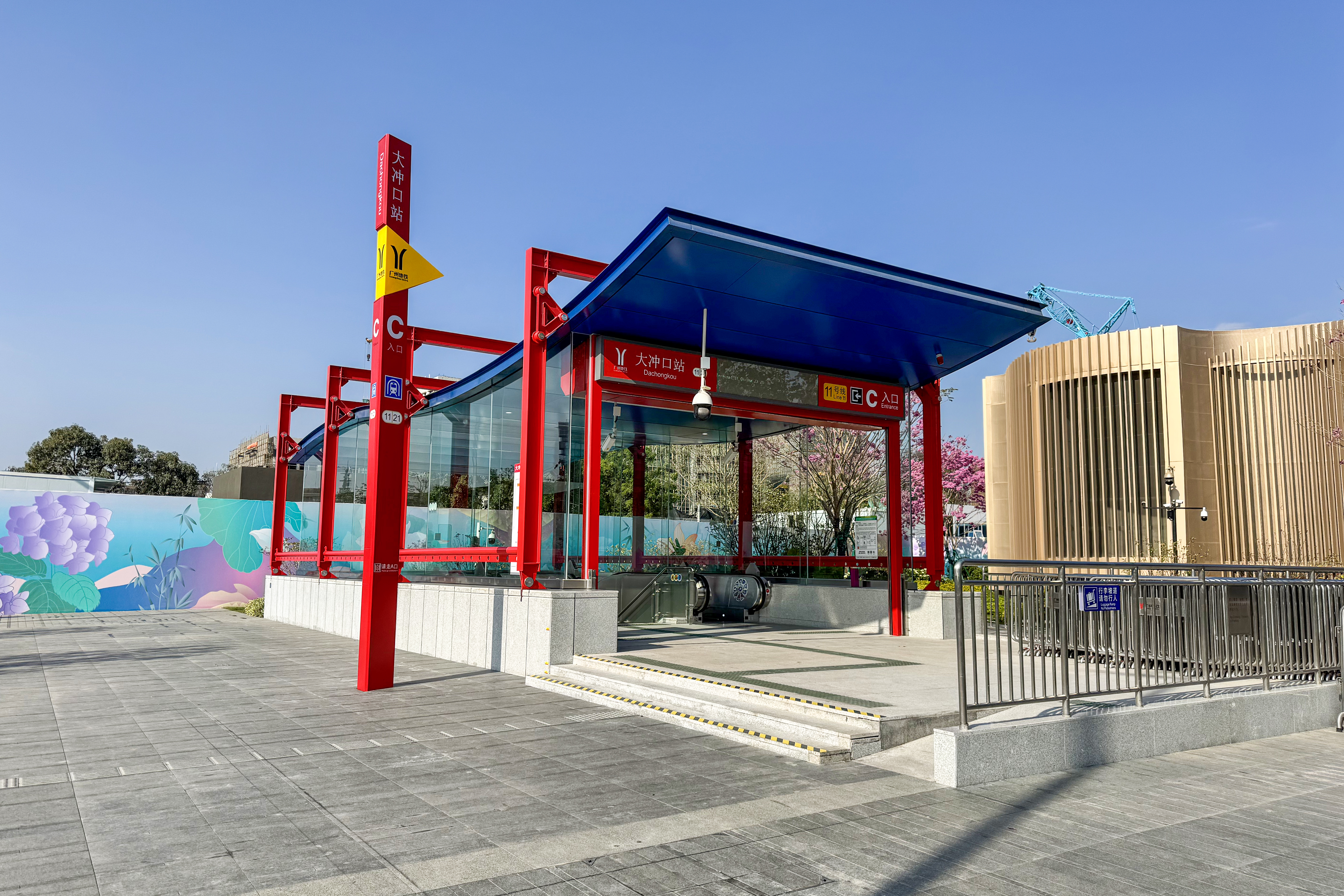
Entrance C

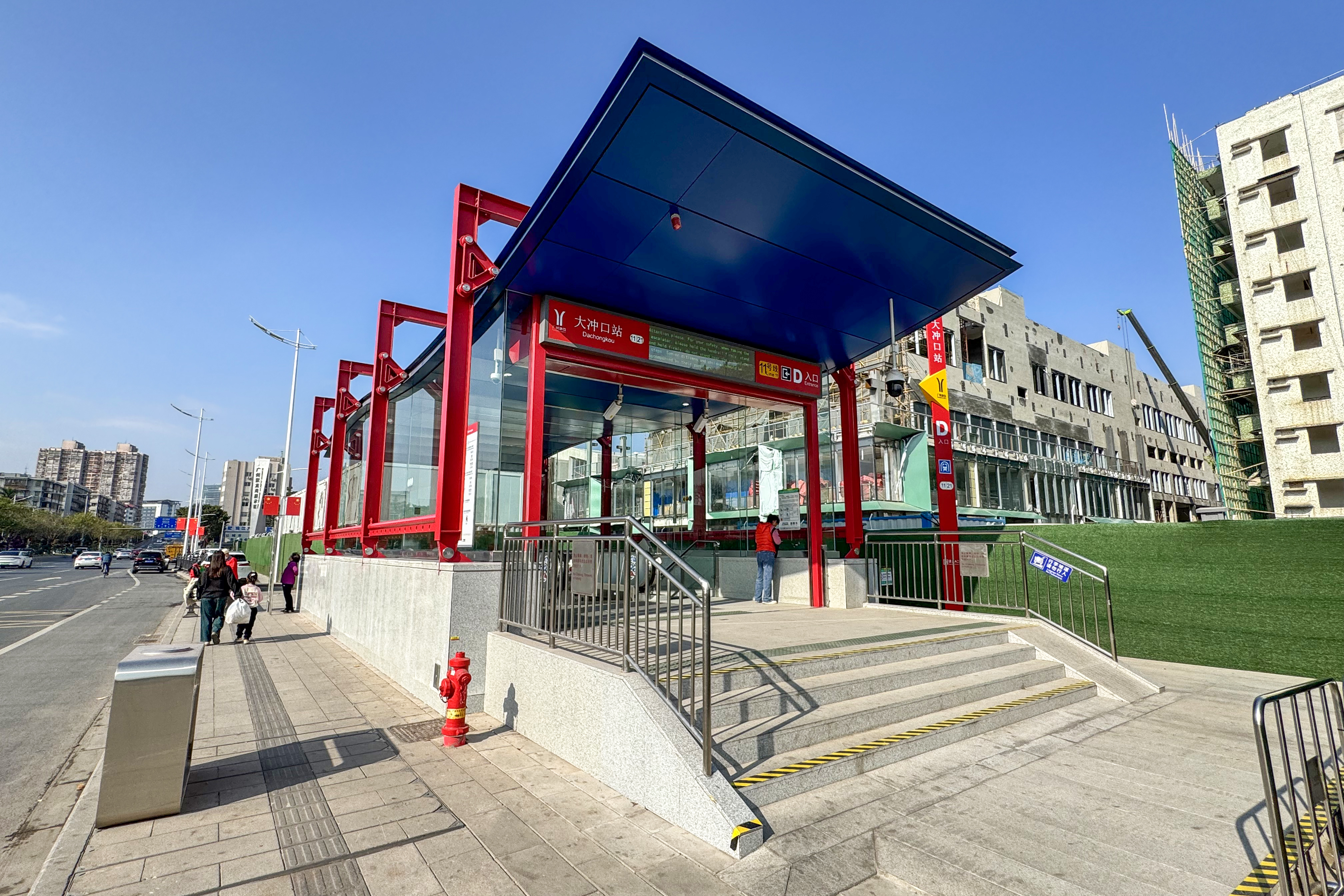
Entrance D

== Gallery ==
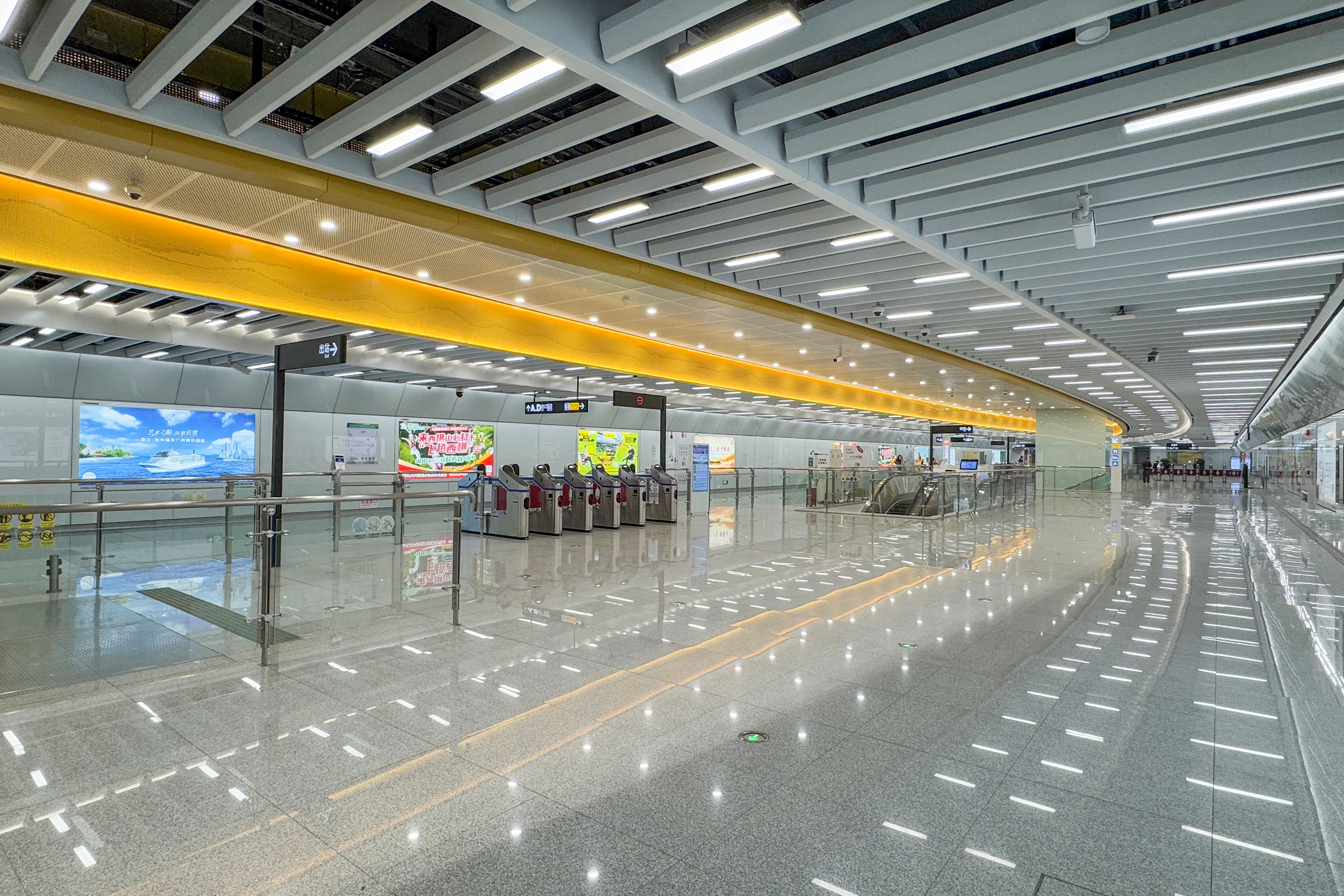
Concourse

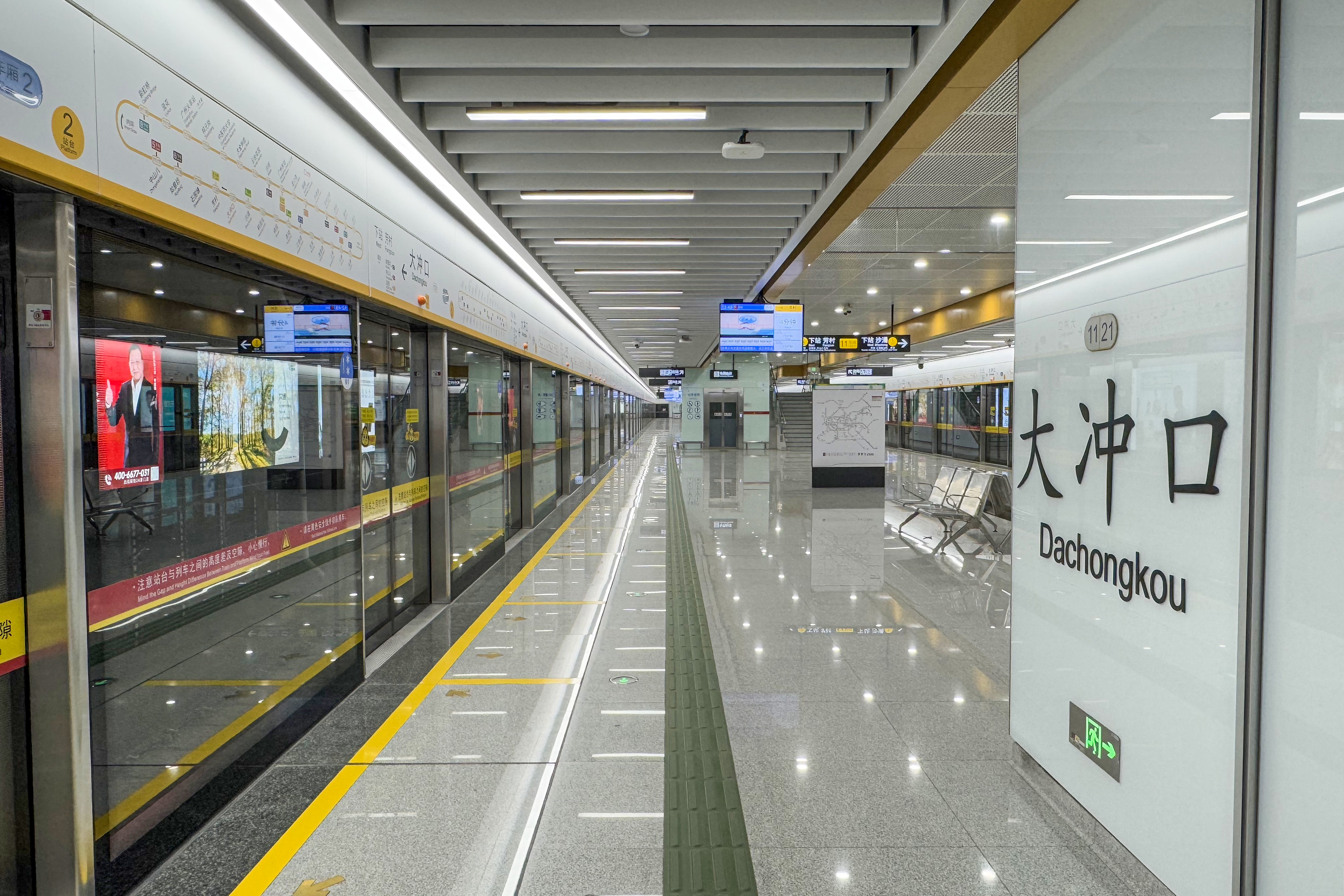
Platform 2 (Inner Circle platform)

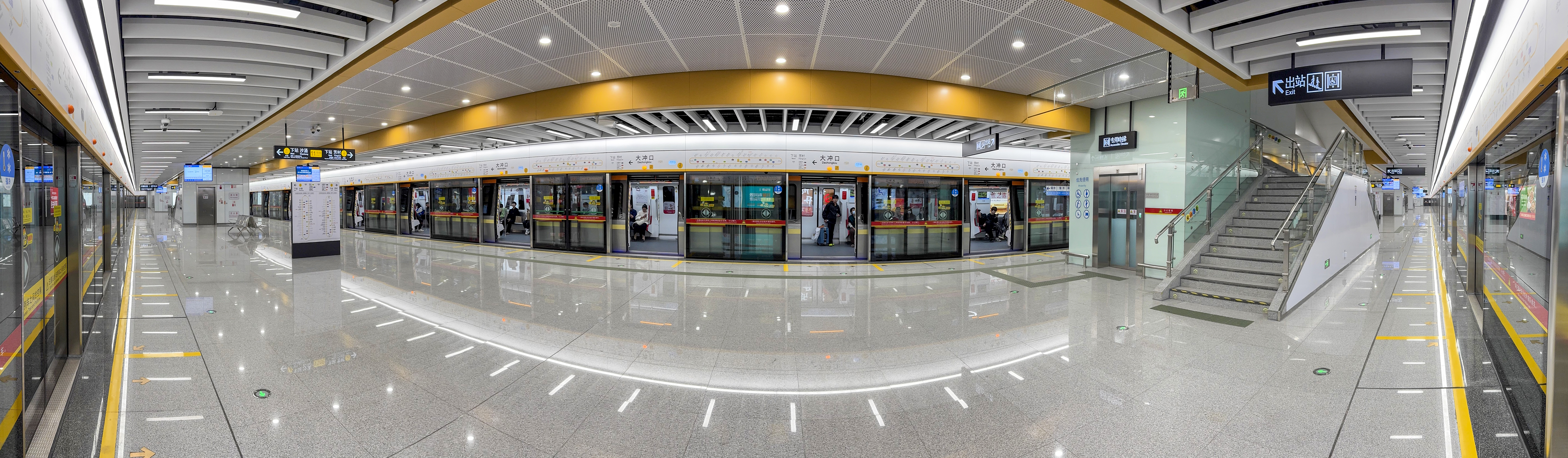
Platform panorama

== History ==
The station first appeared in 2009 in the "Super Ring Line" scheme of Line 11, when it was named Xiafangcun or Port Authority Station. The plan was subsequently adopted, and the construction of the station began under the name of Fangcun Dadaodong (Fangcun Avenue East station).

On 29 April 2017, the station officially started the construction of the enclosure along with the station part of a neighboring station on the line, Shachong. At the same time, the Dachongkou Public Bus Stop (Northbound) near the station needs to be temporarily relocated 200 meters north to accommodate the construction. On 27 July 2020, the station was sealed.

In June 2023, the initial name of the stations on Line 11 was announced, and the station was planned to be named Dachongkou station, and it was then confirmed as the official station name in May 2024. On 3 July 2024, the station completed the "three rights" transfer.

On 28 December 2024, the station was put into use with the opening of Line 11.
