= Yeong-nam =

- Hangul: 영남
- RR: Yeongnam
- MR: Yŏngnam

Yeong-nam, also spelled Young-nam, Yong-nam, is a Korean given name.

== People ==
People with this name include:

- Kim Yong-nam (born 1928), North Korean politician, Chairman of the Presidium of the Supreme People's Assembly
- Jo Young-nam (born 1945), South Korean singer and television personality
- Kim Young-nam (born 1960), retired South Korean male Greco-Roman wrestler
- Moon Young-nam (born 1960), South Korean television screenwriter
- Jang Young-nam (born 1973), South Korean actress
- Choi Young-nam (born 1984), South Korean football player
- Kim Yeong-nam (diver) (born 1996), South Korean diver

== See also ==
- List of Korean given names
- Kim Yeong-nam (disambiguation)
