= Kim Yeong-nam =

Kim Yeong-nam (Korean: 김영남) may refer to:

- Kim Yong-nam (1928–2025), North Korean politician
- Kim Young-nam (born 1960), South Korean sport wrestler
- Kim Yeong-nam (footballer) (born 1991), South Korean footballer
- Kim Yeong-nam (diver) (born 1996), South Korean diver

== See also ==
- Kim Jeong-nam (disambiguation)
