= Jinhua Subdistrict, Guangzhou =

Subdistrict of Guangzhou, China

Coordinates: 23.1302°N 113.2444°E

Jinhua Subdistrict is a subdistrict in Liwan District, Guangzhou, People's Republic of China.

== Schools ==
Local Schools:

- Ludixi Primary School
- Guangzhou Nanhai Middle School
- Guangzhou Liwan District Fourth Middle Juxian Middle School
- Guangzhou Fourth Middle School

== Roads ==
- Xihua road
- Guangfu road
- Ludi Street
- Hean Street
- Doulao Qian
- Jinhua Zhijie
- Zhongshan 7 Road
- Kangwang North Road
- Kangwang Middle Road

== Transport ==
Chen Clan Academy station, an interchange station between Line 1 and Line 8 of the Guangzhou Metro.

== Hospital ==
- Guangzhou Medical University Liwan Hospital
