= Fangcun District =

Former District in China

Coordinates: 23.1029°N 113.2348°E

Fangcun 芳村区
- District of China
- 1949–2005
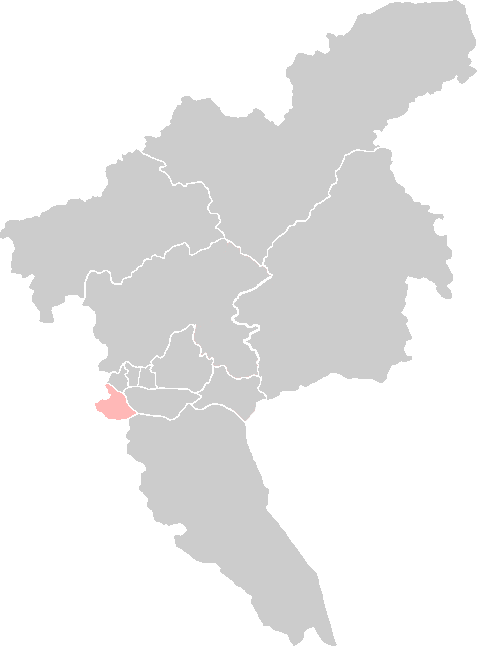
- Location of Fangcun on Guangzhou.
- History
  - Established: 1949
  - Disestablished: 2005
Succeeded by
Liwan District
- Today part of: Part of the Liwan District

Fangcun District (Chinese: 芳村区; Wade–Giles: Fang^{1}tsʻun^{1} Chʻü; Jyutping: fong1 cyun1 keoi1) was a former district in Guangzhou, Guangdong, China. It lay to the southwest of Guangzhou's modern downtown area and south of the Pearl River. It was established in 1949 after the Chinese Communist Party took over Guangzhou from the Kuomintang. In 2005, it merged with the Liwan District.

== See also ==
- Fangcun, Guangzhou
- Liwan District
