= Kim Jeong-nam =

Kim Jeong-nam or Kim Jong-nam (Korean: 김정남) may refer to:

- Kim Jeong-nam (futsal), player for the South Korea national team at events such as the 2012 AFC Futsal Championship
- Kim Jung-nam (born 1943), South Korean footballer
- Kim Jung-nam (sport shooter), South Korean Paralympic sport shooter
- Kim Jong-nam (weightlifter) (born 1969), North Korean weightlifter; see 1990 World Weightlifting Championships
- Kim Jong-nam (1971–2017), North Korean leader Kim Jong-un's brother
- Kim Jeong-nam (rower) (born 1963), South Korean Olympic rower
