= Huadi Subdistrict =

Subdistrict in Guangzhou, People's Republic of China

Huadi Subdistrict 花地街道
- Subdistrict
- Interactive map of Huadi Subdistrict
- Coordinates: 23°06′06″N 113°13′44″E
- Country: People's Republic of China
- Province: Guangdong
- Sub-provincial city: Guangzhou
- District: Liwan
- Time zone: UTC+8 (China Standard Time)

Huadi Subdistrict (Chinese: 花地街道; pinyin: Huādì Jiēdào; Jyutping: faa^{1} dei^{2} gaai^{1} dou^{6}) is a subdistrict of Liwan District, Guangzhou, People's Republic of China. As of 2020, it has 8 residential communities (社区) under its administration.

== See also ==
- List of township-level divisions of Guangdong
