= Liwan, Guangzhou =

Liwan 荔湾区
- District
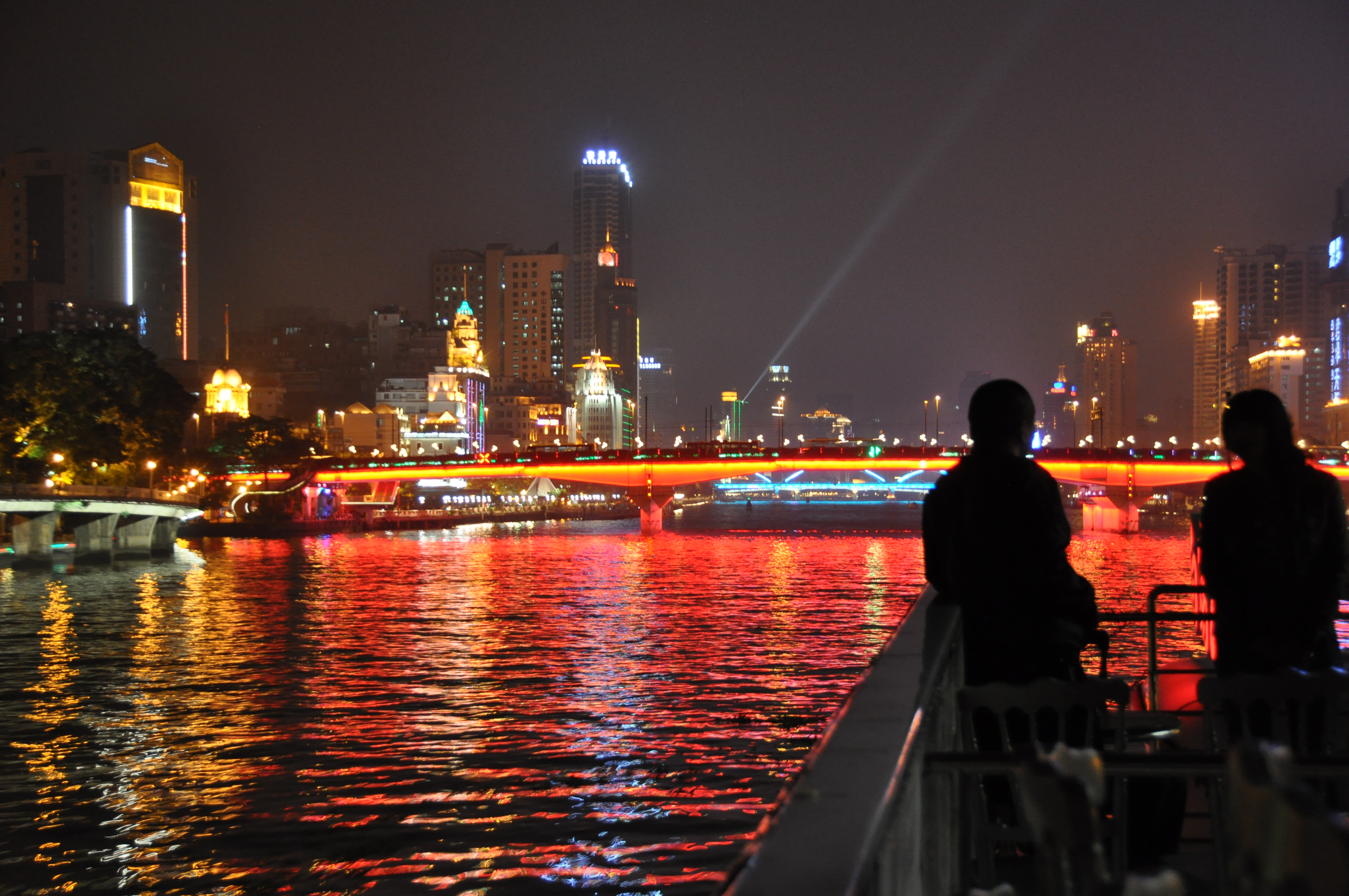
- Shamian Subdistrict riverfront

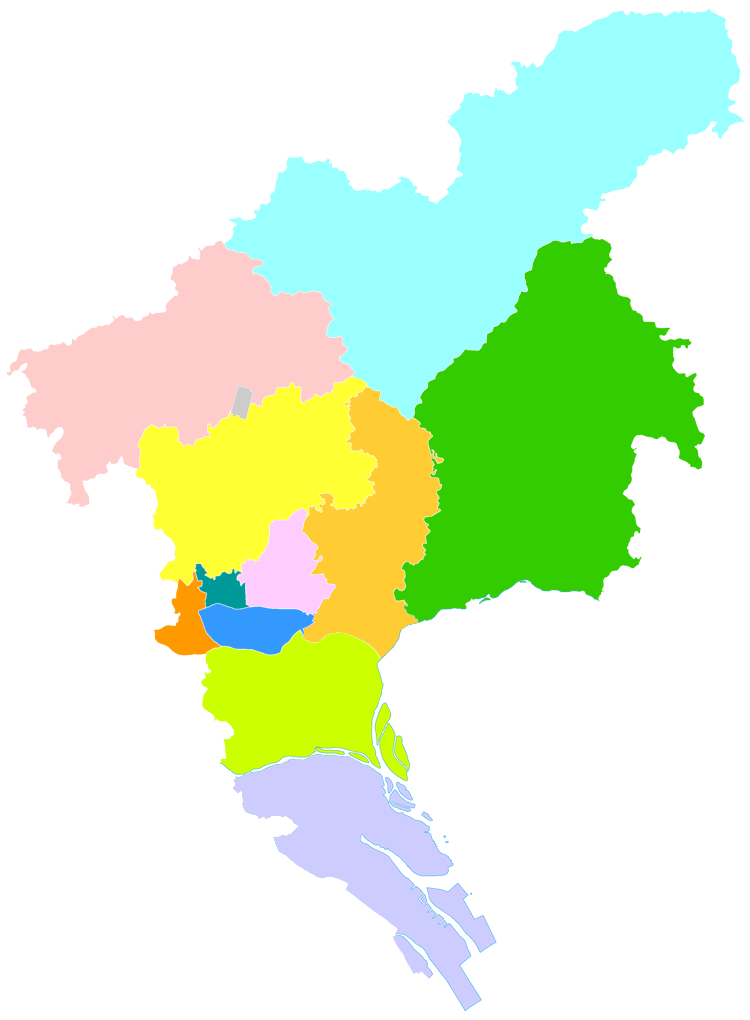
- Liwan in Guangzhou
- Interactive map of Liwan
- Coordinates: 23°06′56″N 113°14′18″E
- Country: People's Republic of China
- Province: Guangdong
- Sub-provincial city: Guangzhou

Area
  - Total: 62.4 km^{2} (24.1 sq mi)

Population (2023)
  - Total: 1,113,000
  - Density: 17,800/km^{2} (46,200/sq mi)
- Time zone: UTC+8 (China Standard)
- Postal code: 510145
- Area code: 020
- Website: Official website

Liwan, Guangzhou
- Simplified Chinese: 荔湾区
- Traditional Chinese: 荔灣區
- Jyutping: Lai6 Waan1 Keoi1
- Hanyu Pinyin: Lìwān Qū
Transcriptions
Standard Mandarin
- Hanyu Pinyin: Lìwān Qū
Yue: Cantonese
- Yale Romanization: Laihwāan Kēui
- Jyutping: Lai6 Waan1 Keoi1
- Canton Romanization: lei6 wan1 kêu1
- IPA: [lɐj˨.wan˥]

Alternative Chinese name
- Simplified Chinese: 荔湾
- Traditional Chinese: 荔灣
- Jyutping: Lai6 Waan1
- Hanyu Pinyin: Lìwān
Transcriptions
Standard Mandarin
- Hanyu Pinyin: Lìwān
Yue: Cantonese
- Yale Romanization: Laihwāan
- Jyutping: Lai6 Waan1
- Canton Romanization: lei6 wan1

Second alternative Chinese name
- Simplified Chinese: 西关
- Traditional Chinese: 西關
- Jyutping: Sai1 Gwaan1
- Hanyu Pinyin: Xiguān
Transcriptions
Standard Mandarin
- Hanyu Pinyin: Xiguān
Yue: Cantonese
- Yale Romanization: Sāigwāan
- Jyutping: Sai1 Gwaan1
- Canton Romanization: sei1 guan1

Third alternative Chinese name
- Chinese: 芳村
- Jyutping: Fong1 Cyun1
- Hanyu Pinyin: Fāngcūn
Transcriptions
Standard Mandarin
- Hanyu Pinyin: Fāngcūn
Yue: Cantonese
- Yale Romanization: Fōng Chyūn
- Jyutping: Fong1 Cyun1
- Canton Romanization: fong1 qun1

Liwan District is one of 11 urban districts of the prefecture-level city of Guangzhou, the capital of Guangdong province, China. The district is split into two parts by the Pearl River: Xiguan in the northeast and Fangcun in the southwest. The area has a prominent history, dating back to the Qin dynasty, and hosts a number of major historic sites. Liwan District spans an area of 62.4 square kilometres (24.1 sq mi), and as of the end of 2023, has a population of about 1,113,000.

== Toponymy ==
Liwan District was named after "Lizhi Wan" (simplified Chinese: 荔枝湾; traditional Chinese: 荔枝灣; pinyin: Lìzhī Wān; lit. 'Lychee Bay'), which is derived from poem of "a bay of green water and red lychees along both banks".

== History ==
From the Qin dynasty through the Qing dynasty, the area of present-day Liwan District belonged to Panyu County and Nanhai County. Liwan was historically located outside the western gates of Guangzhou, in an area known as Xiguan (simplified Chinese: 西关; traditional Chinese: 西關; pinyin: Xīguān; Jyutping: sai1 gwaan1). The district was also the site of the historic area of Huadi, at the southwest of Guangzhou's downtown area and south of Pearl River.

The area of present-day Liwan, along with Guangfu (present Yuexiu), was merged into the newly-formed city of Guangzhou upon its incorporation, on February 15, 1921. Liwan covers an area of 16.2 square kilometres (6.3 sq mi), and has a permanent population of about 540,000 and a permanent nonnative population of over 200,000.

=== People's Republic of China ===
In the months following the proclamation of the People's Republic of China, the area of present-day Liwan District changed administrative organization a number of times.

On October 14, 1949, the government organized the area as Fangcun District (Chinese: 芳村区; pinyin: Fāngcūn Qū). On November 15, it absorbed Chongwen District (Chinese: 崇文区; pinyin: Chóngwén Qū). In June 1954, Fangcun District was abolished, and its area was split between Henan District (Chinese: 河南区; pinyin: Hénán Qū) and Xinjiao District (Chinese: 新滘区; pinyin: Xīnjiào Qū). In April 1959, eight production brigades from Nanhai County were merged into Guangzhou City, and the area of former Fangcun District was placed under the jurisdiction of Jiao District (Chinese: 郊区; pinyin: Jiāo Qū), Guangzhou. After being briefly re-established, Fangcun District was abolished once again on May 11, 1962, and merged into Jiao District. In May 1985, the State Council officially approved the re-establishment of Fangcun District of Guangzhou. In September 2005, Fangcun District was abolished, and re-established as Liwan District.

== Geography ==
Liwan District is positioned in the west part of Guangzhou, on along the banks of the Pearl River. It is bordered by Yuexiu District to the east, Baiyun District to the north, and Nanhai District in Foshan to the west.

=== Climate ===
The area of Liwan District is frequently affected by typhoons. In 2023, the area experienced a total annual precipitation of 1,932.2 millimetres (76.07 in), of which the cumulative precipitation during the flood season (March 27-October 31) was 1,711.7 millimetres (67.39 in), accounting for 88.6% of the annual precipitation.

== Administrative divisions ==
Name	Chinese (S)	Hanyu Pinyin	Guangdong Romanization	Population (2010)	Area (km^{2})
Baihedong Subdistrict	白鹤洞街道	Báihèdòng Jiēdào	bag6 hog6 dung6 gai1 dou6	48,238	3.10
Caihong Subdistrict	彩虹街道	Cǎihóng Jiēdào	coi2 hung4 gai1 dou6	54,348	1.06
Chajiao Subdistrict	茶滘街道	Chájiào Jiēdào	ca4 geo3 gai1 dou6	54,918	4.05
Changhua Subdistrict	昌华街道	Chānghuá Jiēdào	cêng1 wa4 gai1 dou6	32,778	1.61
Chongkou Subdistrict	冲口街道	Chōngkǒu Jiēdào	cung1 heo2 gai1 dou6	48,097	4.20
Dongjiao Subdistrict	东漖街道	Dōngjiào Jiēdào	dung1 gao3 gai1 dou6	35,889	4.60
Dongsha Subdistrict	东沙街道	Dōngshā Jiēdào	dung1 Shā gai1 dou6	29013	7.90
Duobao Subdistrict	多宝街道	Duōbǎo Jiēdào	do1 bou2 gai1 dou6	32,581	0.86
Fengyuan Subdistrict	逢源街道	Féngyuán Jiēdào	fung4 yun4 gai1 dou6	59,337	0.78
Hailong Subdistrict	海龙街道	Hǎilóng Jiēdào	hoi2 lung4 gai1 dou6	31,801	9.49
Huadi Subdistrict	花地街道	Huādì Jiēdào	fa1 déi2 gai1 dou6	39,635	1.63
Hualin Subdistrict	华林街道	Huálín Jiēdào	wa4 lem4 gai1 dou6	46,309	0.72
Jinhua Subdistrict	金花街道	Jīnhuā Jiēdào	gem1 fa1 gai1 dou6	54,670	1.16
Lingnan Subdistrict	岭南街道	Lǐngnán Jiēdào	ling5 nam4 gai1 dou6	27,560	0.90
Longjin Subdistrict	龙津街道	Lóngjīn Jiēdào	lung4 zên1 gai1 dou6	43,518	0.53
Nanyuan Subdistrict	南源街道	Nányuán Jiēdào	nam4 yun4 gai1 dou6	70,066	1.85
Qiaozhong Subdistrict	桥中街道	Qiáozhōng Jiēdào	kiu4 zung1 gai1 dou6	31,643	4.40
Shamian Subdistrict	沙面街道	Shāmiàn Jiēdào	sa1 min2 gai1 dou6	3,397	0.30
Shiweitang Subdistrict	石围塘街道	Shíwéitáng Jiēdào	ség6 wei4 tong4 gai1 dou6	57,192	5.18
Xicun Subdistrict	西村街道	Xicūn Jiēdào	sei1 qun1 gai1 dou6	45,069	3.27
Zhanqian Subdistrict	站前街道	Zhànqián Jiēdào	zam6 qin4 gai1 dou6	27,431	0.96
Zhongnan Subdistrict	中南街道	Zhōngnán Jiēdào	zung1 nam4 gai1 dou6	24,710	7.00

== Demographics ==
As of the end of 2023, Liwan District has a permanent population of 1,113,000, and a hukou population of 804,800. Its population growth rate in 2023 was -1.98‰ (per mille).

== Transport ==
Liwan district has a well-developed transport network connecting with the railway station and Guangzhou Baiyun International Airport in the north. Renmin Bridge and Zhujiang Tunnel link the banks of the Pearl River in the southern part of Liwan. Zhujiang Bridge, which connects Nanhai and Foshan, links the east and west together in Liwan's west. Guangzhou South Railway Cargo Station of Jingguang Railway and Xinfeng Terminal are in Liwan's southwest. No. 107 State Highway and Guang-Fo Highway connecting with Guang-Shen Highway are through to Hong Kong. Line 1 of Guangzhou Metro and Inner overhead road pass through the District.

=== Metro ===
Liwan is currently serviced by eight metro lines operated by Guangzhou Metro:

- Line 1 - Chen Clan Academy ( 8 ), Changshou Lu, Huangsha ( 6 ), Fangcun ( 11 , 22 ), Huadiwan, Kengkou, Xilang ( 10 , 22 , Guangfo )
- Line 5 - Jiaokou, Tanwei ( 6 ), Zhongshanba ( 11 ), Xichang, Xicun ( 8 )
- Line 6 - Hesha, Tanwei ( 5 ), Ruyifang ( 11 ), Huangsha ( 1 ), Cultural Park ( 8 )
- Line 8 - Cultural Park ( 6 ), Hualinsi Buddhist Temple, Chen Clan Academy ( 1 ), Caihong Bridge ( 11 ), Xicun ( 5 )
- Line 10 - Xilang ( 1 , 22 , Guangfo ), Huawei, Dongsha
- Line 11 - Caihong Bridge ( 8 ), Zhongshanba ( 5 ), Ruyifang ( 6 ), Shiweitang, Fangcun ( 1 , 22 ), Dachongkou, Shachong ( Guangfo ), Hedong East
- Line 22 - Nanjiao, Xilang ( 1 , 10 , Guangfo ), Fangcun ( 1 , 11 )
- Guangfo line - Longxi, Jushu, Xilang ( 1 , 10 , 22 ), Hedong, Shachong ( 11 )

== Tourism ==
Liwan District has many attractions and historical sites. The historically famous "Lizhi Wan" (simplified Chinese: 荔枝湾; traditional Chinese: 荔枝灣; pinyin: Lìzhī Wān; lit. 'Lychee Bay'), has a 1,000-year history. In addition, there are historic sites where Dr. Sun Yat-sen, Zhan Tianyou, Chen Shaobai and Tang Tingguang lived or worked. There are Guangya School setup by Zhang Zhidong, a member of the Westernization Movement in the late Qing Dynasty and relic site of Xicun Industrial Zone developed by Chen Jitang when was in power during PC period.

Major historic sites within Liwan District include the Chen Clan Ancestral Hall, Shamian Island, Xilaichudi, Renwei Temple, Huaiyuanyi (Chinese: 怀远驿; pinyin: Huáiyuǎnyì), the Thirteen Factories, Haishan Xianguan, the site of the Bahe Huiguan, the site of the Jinlun Huiguan, the Hip Tung Wo Engineering Works, and the Nanfang Building. Of these, Chen Clan Ancestral Hall and Shamian Island are designated as national key protected cultural relic units. The Chen Clan Ancestral Hall was elected one of the 8 new scenic spots of Guangzhou. Haishan Xianguan was historically a leader of Lingnan horticulture, and contributed to the development of Lingnan culture. The area of the Thirteen Factories was the sole legal site of foreign trade within China for nearly one hundred years.

There are several municipality-level relic spots: Hualin Temple, one of Guangzhou's Buddhist "five jungles", Taoist Zhenwudi Renwei Temple, Jiang Guangding's former residence, Li Wentian's Taihua Building and Xiguan big house.

In order to integrate those typical spots organically for tourists' convenience, Liwan District Administration divides them into 4 tourist areas, Xiguan Folk Custom Area, Chen Clan Temple Cultural and Leisure Area, Shamian Continental Tourist Area, and Shisanhang Commercial and Cultural Area. It is proposed to build large-scale "Lingnan Custom" tourist project at Xiguan Folk Custom Area so as to provide domestic and foreign tourists with all-directional services in tour, culture, leisure, foods and accommodation.

Liwan District is home to Shangxiajiu Pedestrian Street, a prominent commercial pedestrian street first opened in 1995. In 1996, it was elected one of the 10 tourist attractions of Guangzhou. There are many special streets such as blackwood and jade street, ceramic crafts street, and more than 100 wholesale markets engaged in traditional Chinese medicine, aquatic products, shoes, stationery, metal ware, textile (knitted), electric appliance (communications) and decoration materials, among which Qingping Traditional Chinese Herbs and Huangsha Aquatic Product Market are State-level markets; Yiyuan Stationery Market, Guangdong Electric Appliance City are province-level markets.

Liwan District is home to a number of prominent restaurants, including that of the White Swan Hotel, Guangzhou Restaurant, Shengli Hotel, Qingping Restaurant, Tao Tao Ju, Lianxiang Lou, and Panxi Restaurant. Famous local culinary specialties include Shunji coconut ice cream, Wuzhanji Jidi congee, Tingzai congee, Ouchengji dumpling and Nanxin double-condensed milk.

== Economy ==
MINISO has its headquarters in Liwan District.

== Education ==
Schools include:

- Guangzhou Xiehe High School
- Guangzhou True Light Middle School
- Guangzhou Peiying Middle School (Formerly known as Guangzhou Puiying Middle School)
- The Thirty-Fifth Middle School (广州第三十五中学).

== Notable people ==
- Liang Lizhen, table tennis player
- Liang Yiwen, OB-GYN
- Zhan Tianyou, railroad engineer
- Zhang Zhujun, physician and revolutionary
