= Fangcun, Guangzhou =

Area of Guangzhou, China

Coordinates: 23.1029°N 113.2348°E

Fangcun (Chinese: 芳村; Jyutping: Fong1 Cyun1), formerly known as Fe Tee, Fa Ti, or Fati (Chinese: 花埭 / 花地; pinyin: Huādài / Huādì; Jyutping: Fa^{1}dei^{6}), from its Cantonese pronunciation, is a former area of Guangzhou, Guangdong Province, China. It lay to the southwest of Guangzhou's central business district and south of the Pearl River. It was well known as the site of garden nurseries for flower and ornamental tree production as early as the 9th century, and the source of many "exotic" plants brought back to Europe in the 19th century. Fangcun became an independent district of Guangzhou known as the Fangcun District, then merged with the Liwan District in 2005.

== See also ==
- Fangcun District: now abolished and merged with the Liwan District
- Liwan District
