= Nanpu West station =

Guangzhou Metro Line 22 station

Nanpu West 南浦西
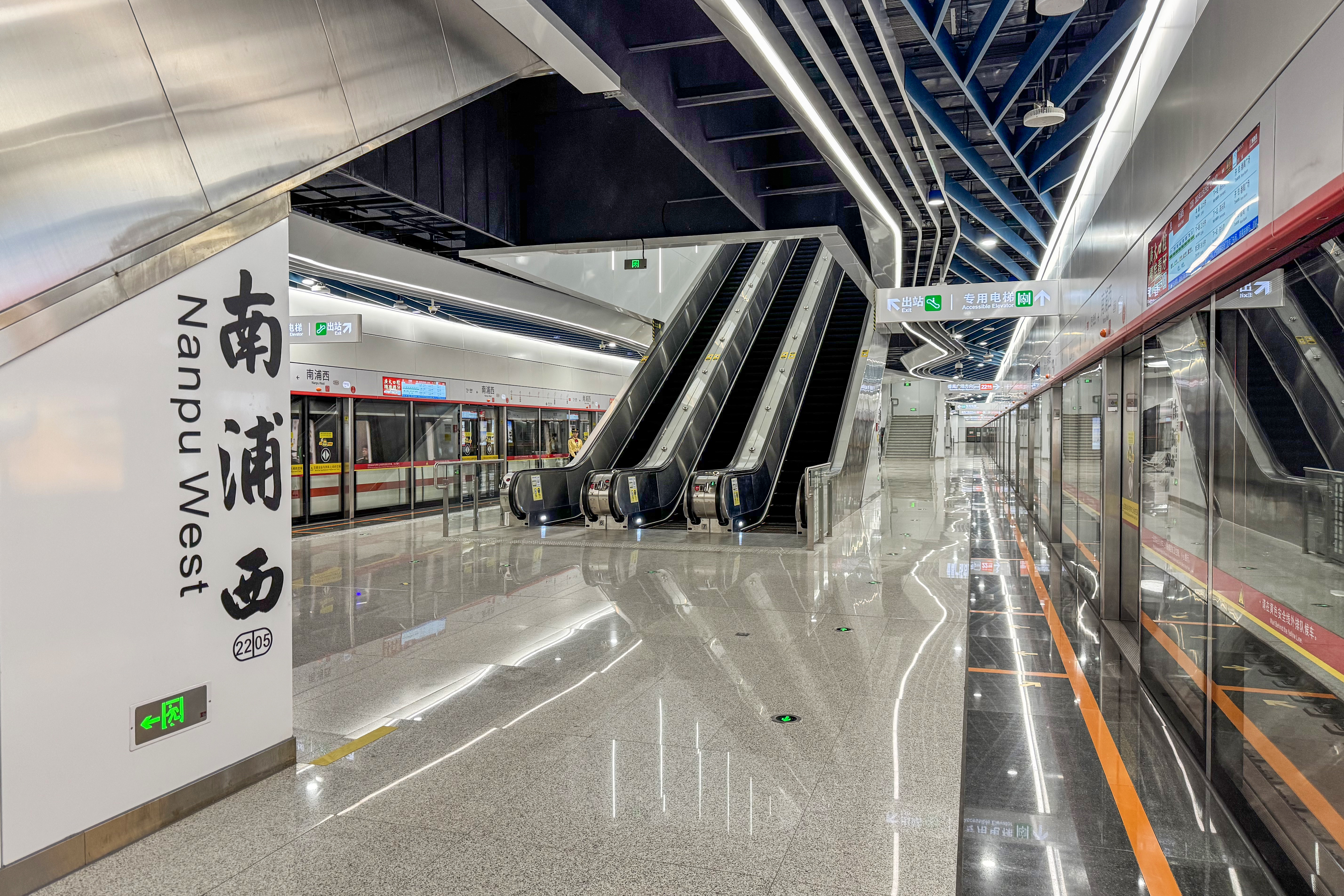
- Platform 2

Chinese name
- Chinese: 南浦西站
Transcriptions
Standard Mandarin
- Hanyu Pinyin: Nánpǔ Xī Zhàn
Yue: Cantonese
- Yale Romanization: Nàahmpóu Sāi Jaahm
- Jyutping: naam^{4} pou^{4} sai^{1} zaam^{6}
- Hong Kong Romanization: Nam Po West station

General information
- Location: Panyu District, Guangzhou, Guangdong; China
- Coordinates: 23°2′28.28″N 113°15′19.22″E
- Owner: Guangzhou Metro Co. Ltd.
- Operator: Guangdong Intercity Railway Operation Co., Ltd.
- Line: Line 22
- Platforms: 2 (1 island platform)
- Tracks: 2

Construction
- Structure type: Underground
- Accessible: Yes

Other information
- Station code: 2205

History
- Opened: 29 December 2025; 7 months ago

Services
Preceding station	Guangzhou Metro	Following station
Nanjiao towards Fangcun	Line 22	Chentougang towards Panyu Square
Location

Nanpu West station (Chinese: 南浦西站; Jyutping: naam^{4} pou^{2} sai^{1} zaam^{6}; Cantonese Yale: Nàahmpóu Sāi Jaahm) is a station on Line 22 of the Guangzhou Metro. It is located on the west of the Dongxin Expressway Overpass in the Panyu District of Guangzhou. It opened on 29 December 2025.

== Station layout ==
The station has four floors. The ground level is the station's entrances and exits, surrounded by buildings and farmland such as the Dongxin Expressway Overpass, Xixiang 3rd Road, Nanpu West 3rd Village, and Minjie Jinyuewan Community; the first floor connects the entrances and exits to the concourse; the second floor is the concourse; the third floor is the station equipment area; and the fourth floor has the Line 22 platform.

L1; Exits	Exits	Exits, Security Facilities
L2; Concourse	Lobby	Ticket Machines, Customer Service, Shops, Police Station
L3	Equipment Area	Station equipments
L4; Platforms	Platform 1	22 towards Fangcun (Nanjiao)
L4; Platforms	Island platform, doors will open on the left
L4; Platforms	Platform 2	22 towards Panyu Square (Chentougang)

=== Exits ===
The station has 3 points of entry/exit, with Exit B being accessible via elevator. There is a reserved exit in the southeast.

==== North concourse ====
- A: Xixiang Third Road
- B: Xixiang Third Road

==== South concourse ====
- C: Huandao West Road
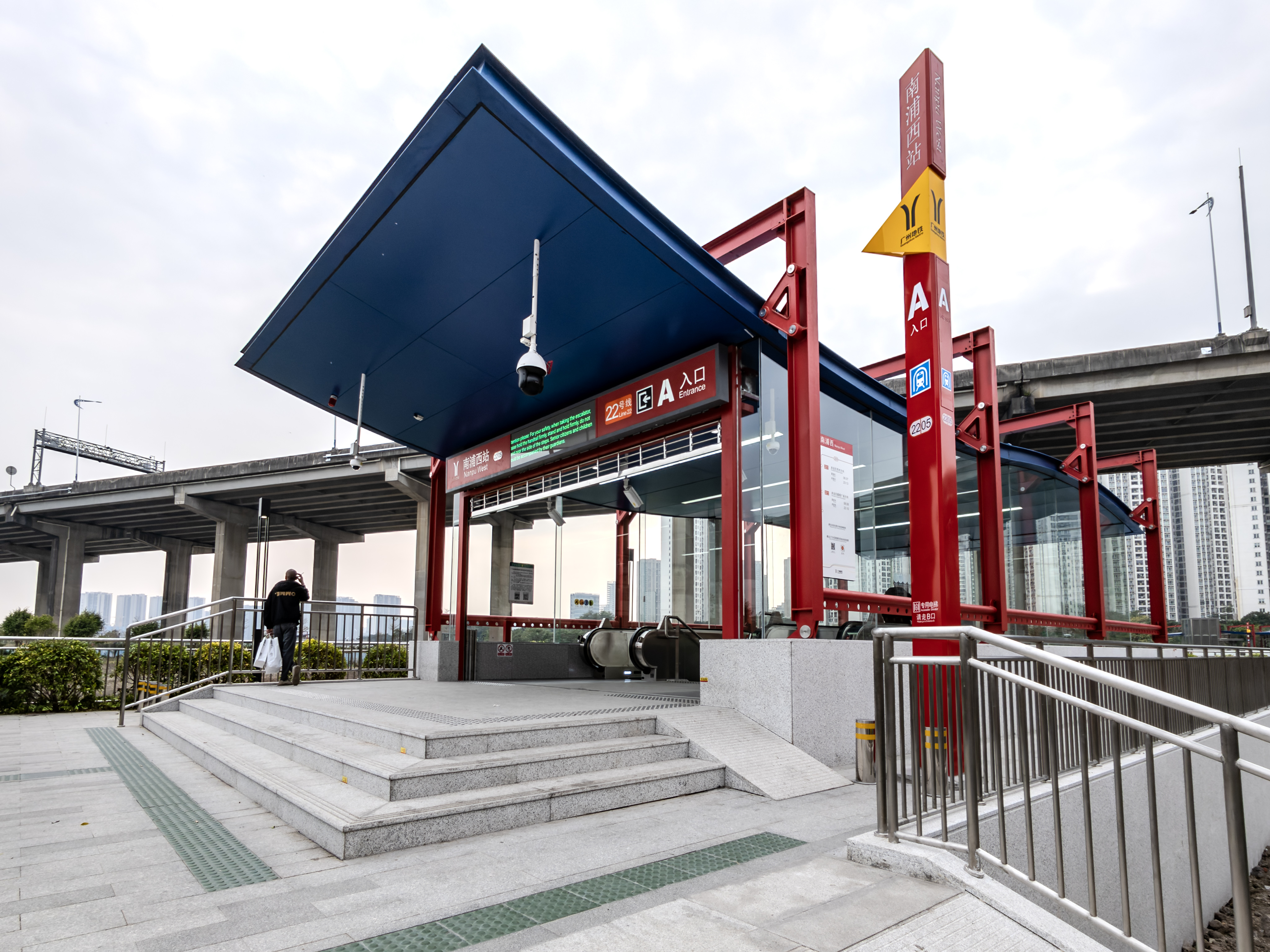
Exit A

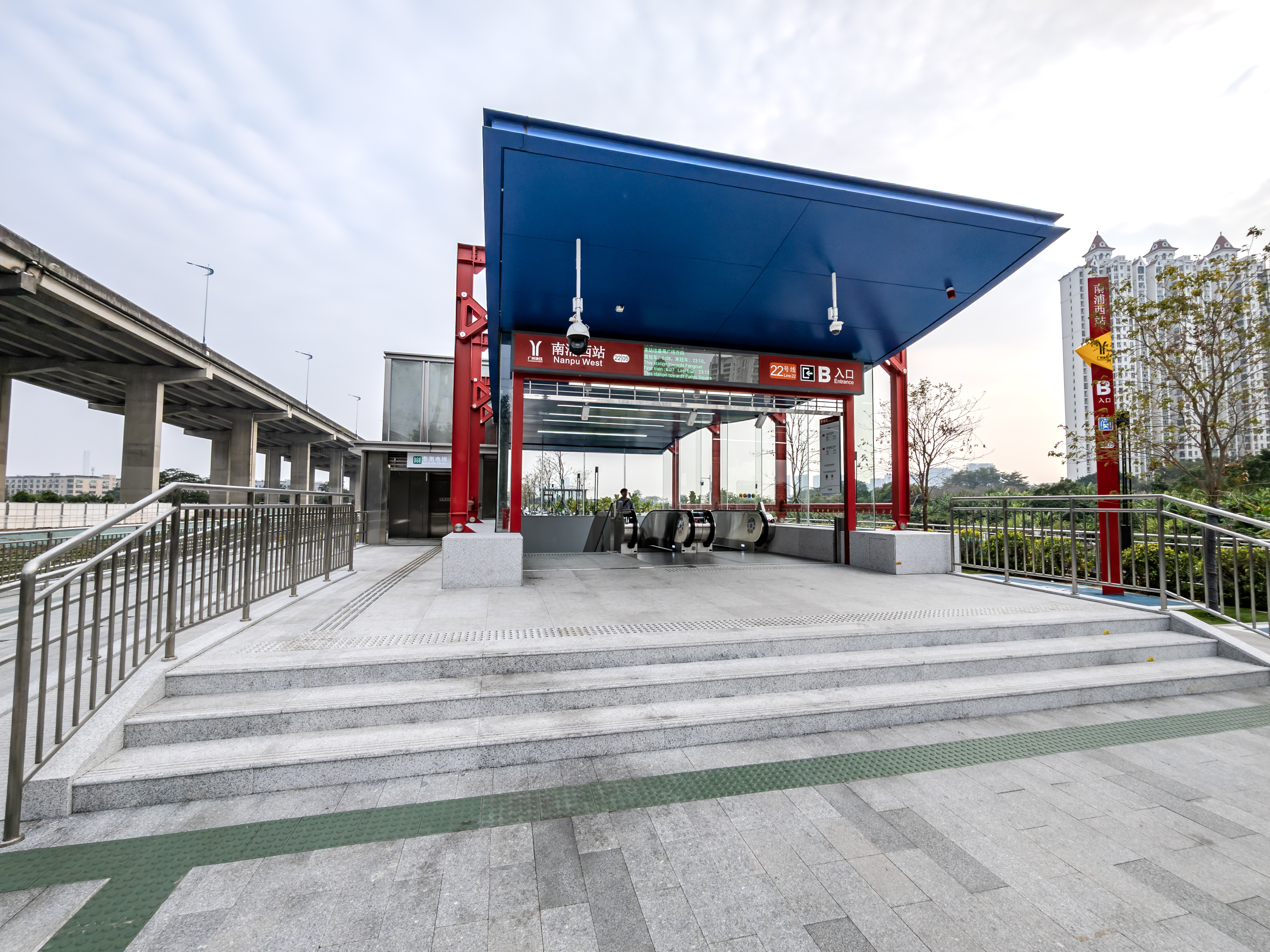
Exit B

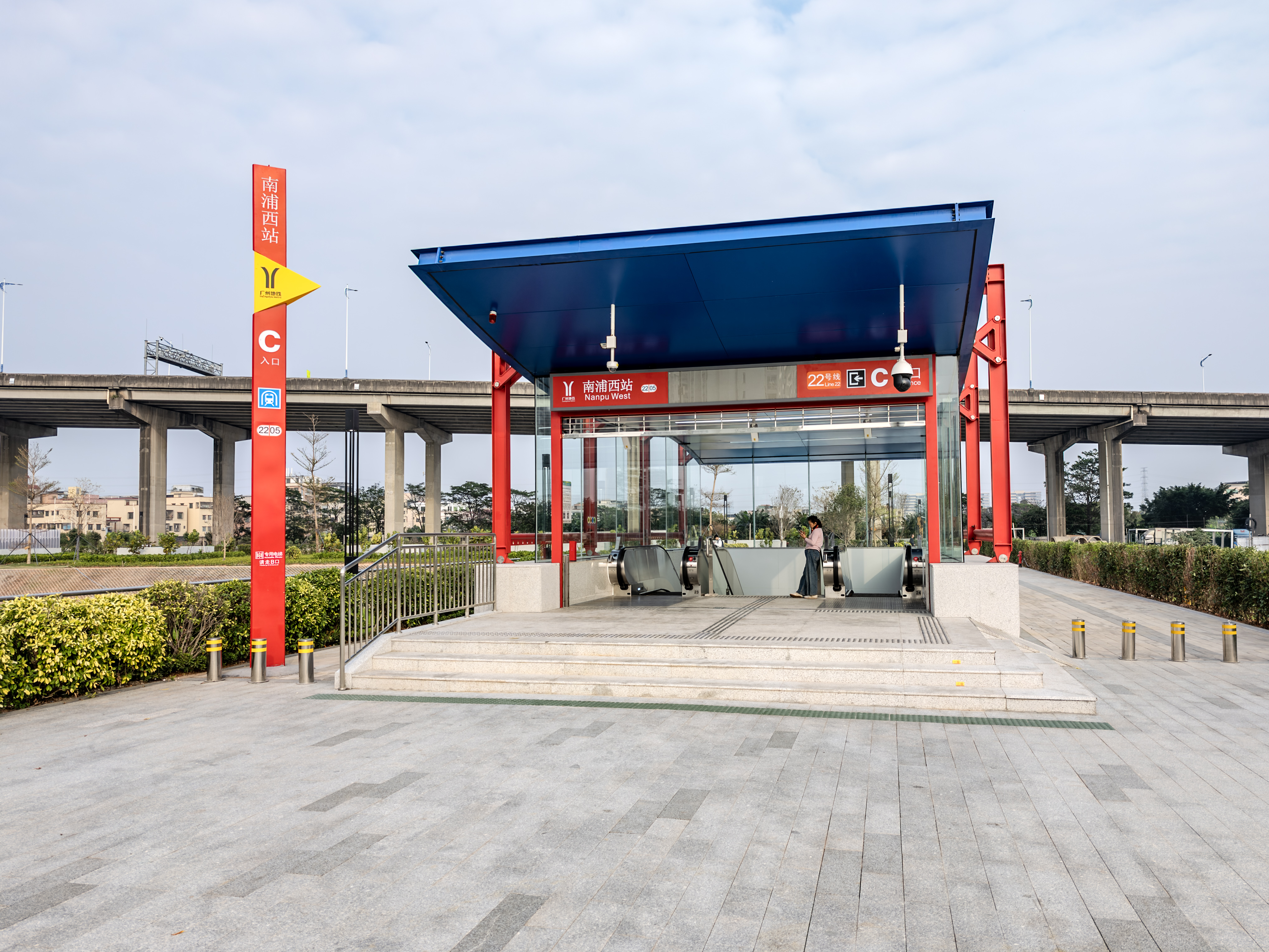
Exit C

== History ==
In June 2020, the station's name was changed from its planning name "West Third Station" to its official name "Nanpu West Station".

On 30 April 2020, the construction of this station officially began; and on 15 December 2022, the main structure was topped out, becoming the first station to be topped out in the remaining section of Line 22 Phase 1.

On 17 December 2022, the construction works of the remaining section of Line 22 (Chentougang to Fangcun) have been completed by 28%. Among the four stations, one has completed the main structure capping, and the other three are undergoing civil engineering works. Among the four sections of tunnel, one is undergoing civil engineering works, and the other three are undergoing pre-construction preparations.

On 18 June 2024, the construction works of the remaining section of Line 22 has been completed by 68%. Among the 4 stations, 3 have been capped and 1 is undergoing civil engineering construction. Among the 4 sections of tunnel, 1 has been connected and 3 are undergoing civil engineering construction; with a total of 5 shield tunneling machines excavating.

On 7 December 2024, with the completion of the steel sleeve reception of the left-line tunnel boring machine in the Nanpu West to Nanjiao section, the Line 22 remaining section tunnel has been fully excavated, completing the construction works by 91%. All four stations have been capped and electromechanical construction has begun, and all four sections of tunnel have been connected.

On 29 December 2025, the station was opened.

== Future expansion ==
In the future, this station will become a transfer station for Line 22 and Line 19. However, Line 19 is a long-term route and it currently has no transfer provisions.
