= Nanjiao station =

Guangzhou Metro Line 22 station

Nanjiao 南漖
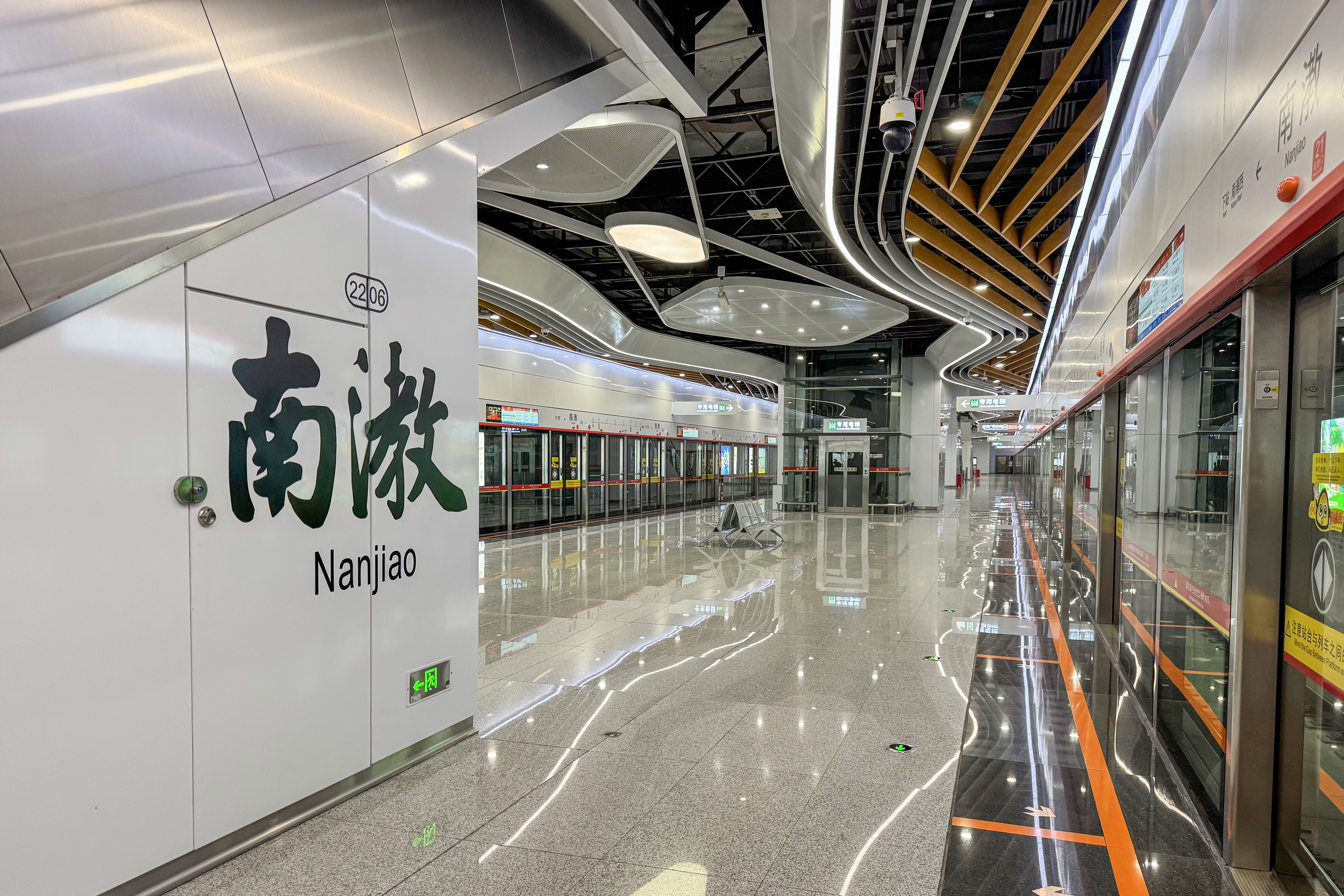
- Platform 2

Chinese name
- Chinese: 南漖站
Transcriptions
Standard Mandarin
- Hanyu Pinyin: Nánjìao Zhàn
Yue: Cantonese
- Yale Romanization: Nàahmgaau Jaahm
- Jyutping: naam^{4} gaau^{3} zaam^{6}
- Hong Kong Romanization: Nam Kau station

General information
- Location: Huancui South Road (环翠南路); Dongsha Subdistrict, Liwan District, Guangzhou, Guangdong; China
- Coordinates: 23°3′11.70″N 113°14′36.49″E
- Owner: Guangzhou Metro Co. Ltd.
- Operator: Guangdong Intercity Railway Operation Co., Ltd.
- Line: Line 22
- Platforms: 2 (1 island platform)
- Tracks: 2

Construction
- Structure type: Underground
- Accessible: Yes

Other information
- Station code: 2206

History
- Opened: 29 December 2025 (7 months ago)

Services
Preceding station	Guangzhou Metro	Following station
Xilang towards Fangcun	Line 22	Nanpu West towards Panyu Square
Location

Nanjiao station (Chinese: 南漖站; Jyutping: naam^{4} gaau^{3} zaam^{6}; Cantonese Yale: Nàahmgaau Jaahm) is a station on Line 22 of the Guangzhou Metro. It is located under Huancai South Road, in the Liwan District of Guangzhou. It opened on 29 December 2025.

== Station layout ==
=== Structure ===
The station is a two-storey underground station. The ground level is the exit, and it is surrounded by Huancui South Road, Libai Science and Technology Park, Nanyi Village and other nearby buildings. The first floor is the concourse, and the second floor are the platforms. There is a single storage line to the west of the station.

G	-	Exits
L1; Concourse	Lobby	Ticket Machines, Customer Service, Shops, Police Station, Security Facilities
L2; Platforms	Platform 1	22 towards Fangcun (Xilang)
L2; Platforms	Island platform, doors will open on the left (Toilets, Nursery)
L2; Platforms	Platform 2	22 towards Panyu Square (Nanpu West)

=== Concourse ===
The concourse has self-service facilities including automatic ticket vending machines and intelligent customer service centers. There are elevators, escalators and stairs in the fare-paid area for passengers to access the platforms.

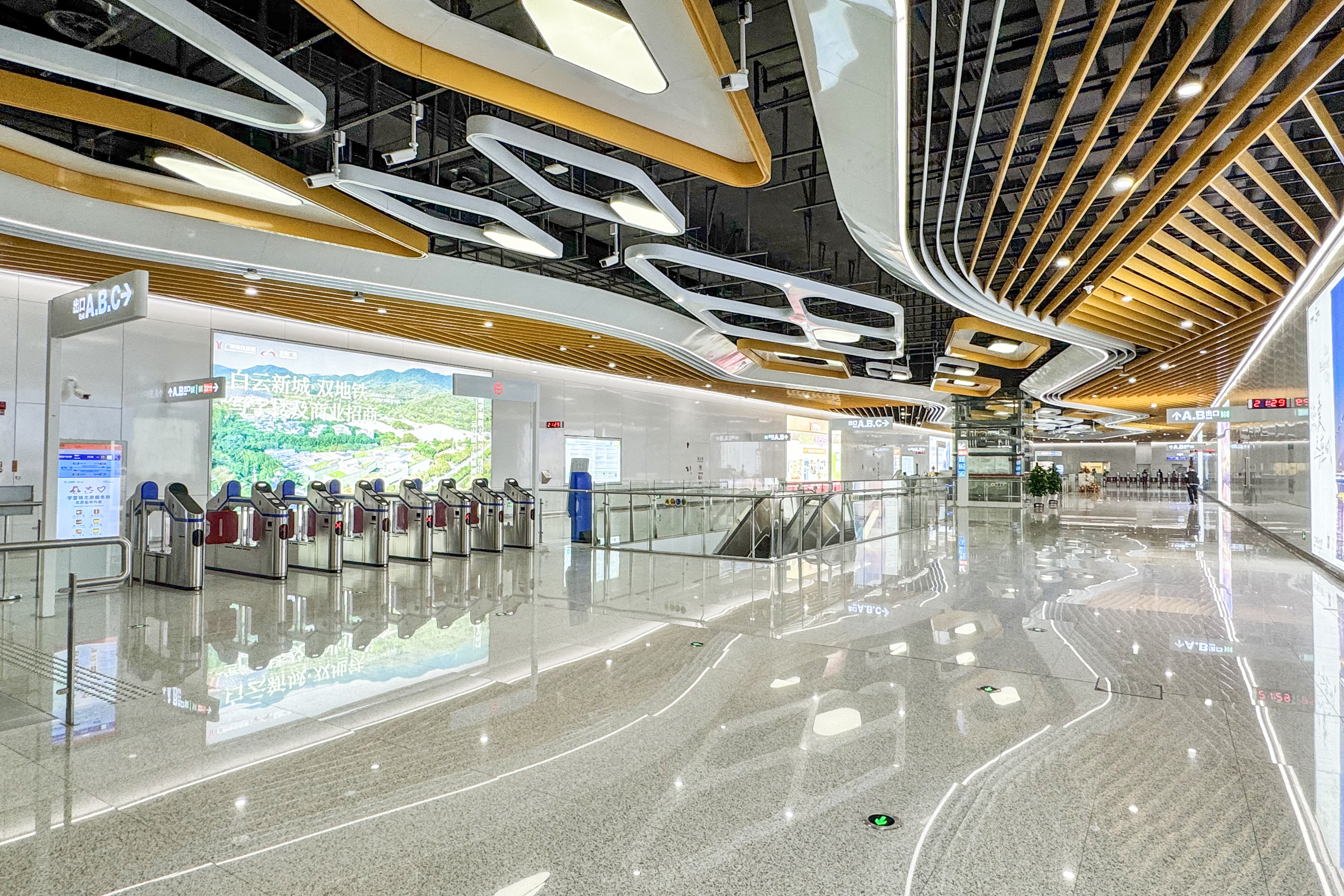
Concourse

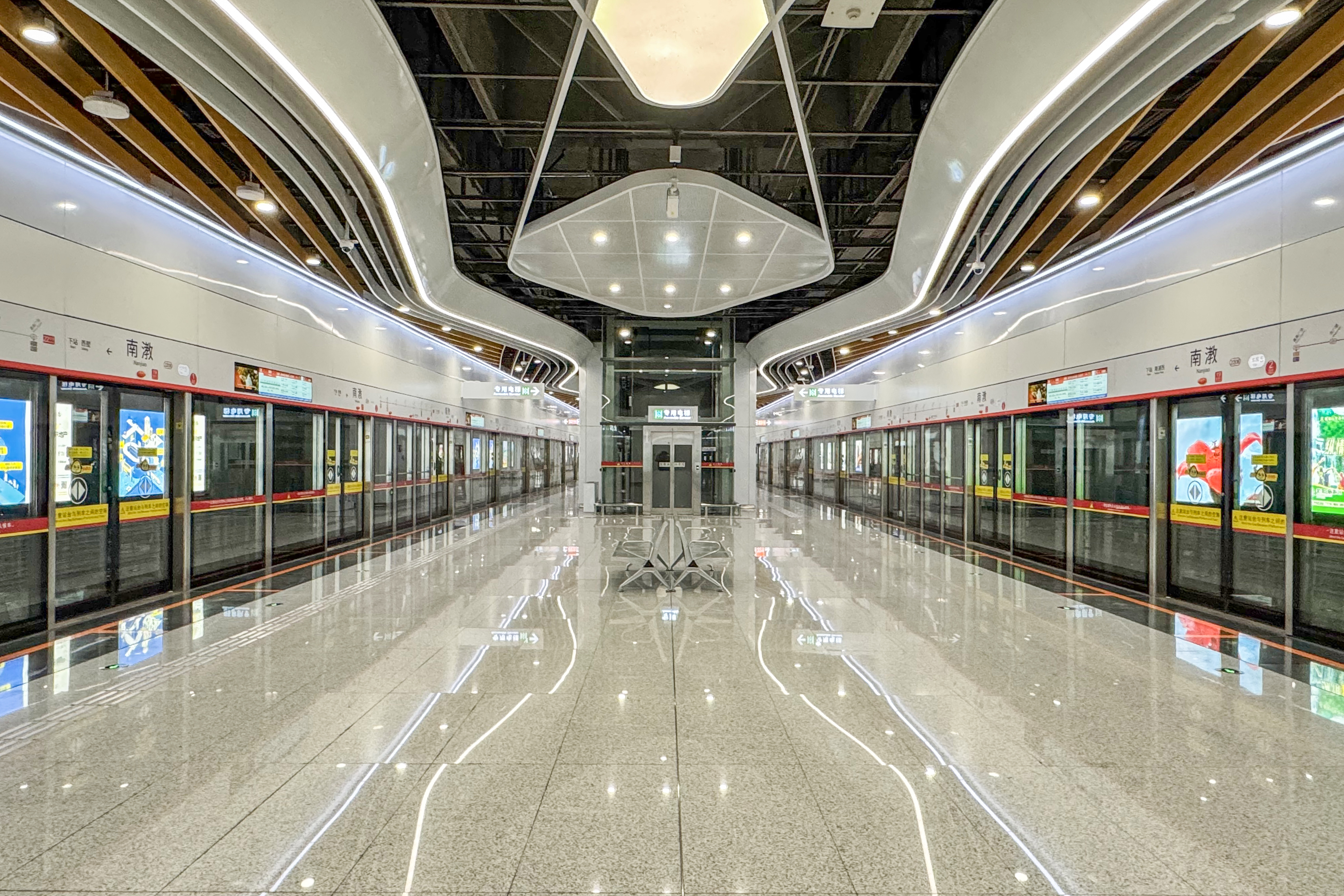
Platform view from the middle

=== Platform ===
The station has an island platform located under Huancui South Road. The toilets and nursery are located at the end of the platform towards Xilang. In addition, there is a single turnback line toward the same direction.

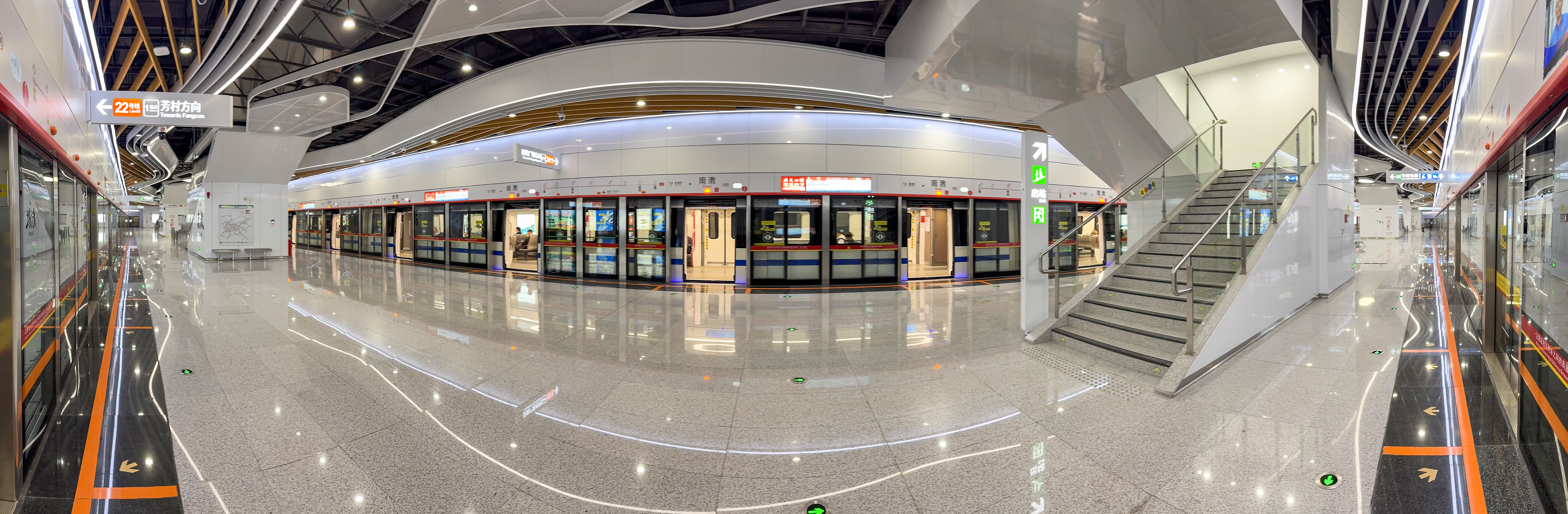
Platform panorama

=== Entrances/exits ===
The station has 4 points of entry/exit, with Exit B being accessible via elevator.

- A1: Huancui South Road
- A2: Huancui South Road
- B: Huancui South Road
- C: Huancui South Road
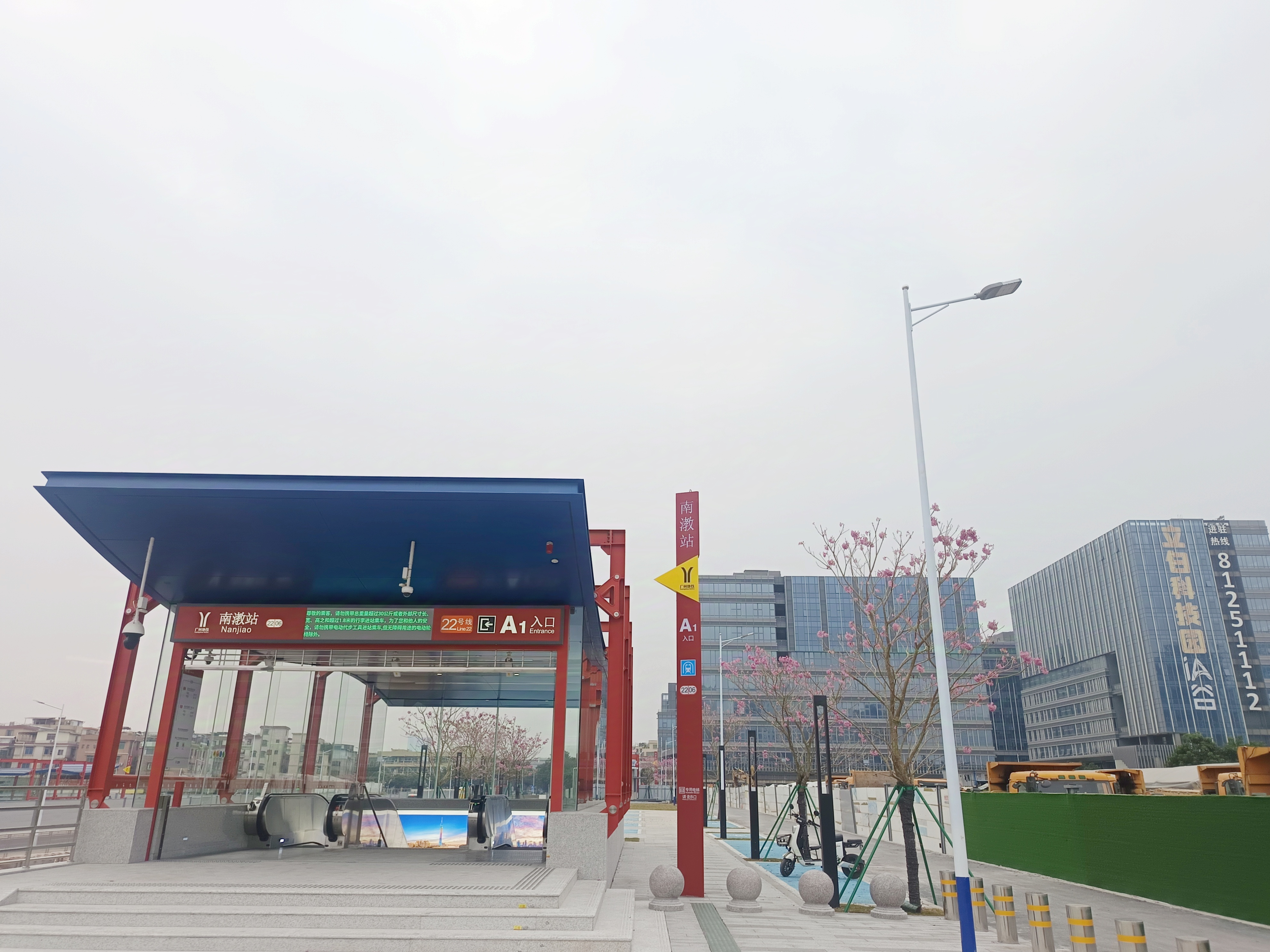
Entrance A1

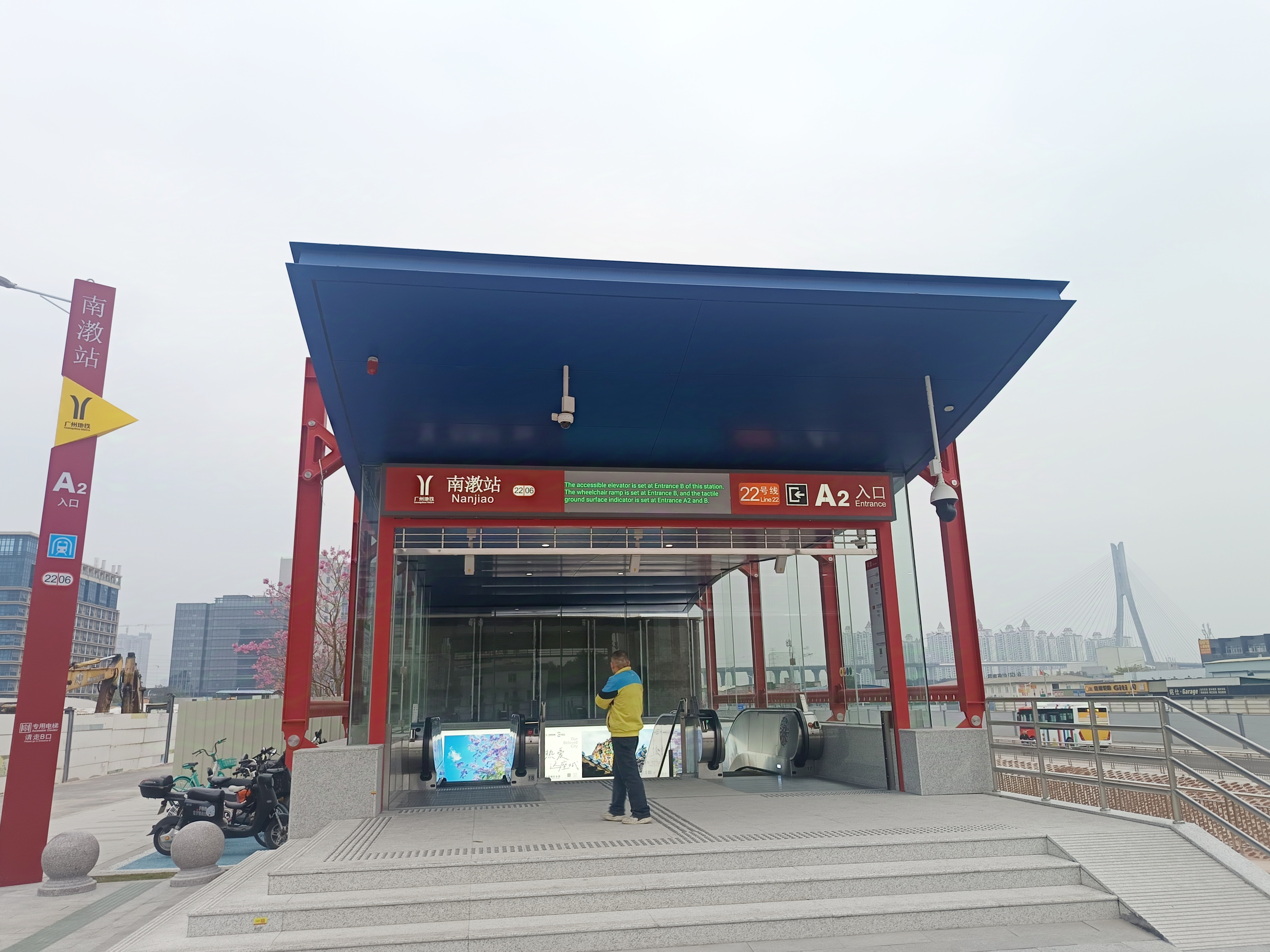
Entrance A2

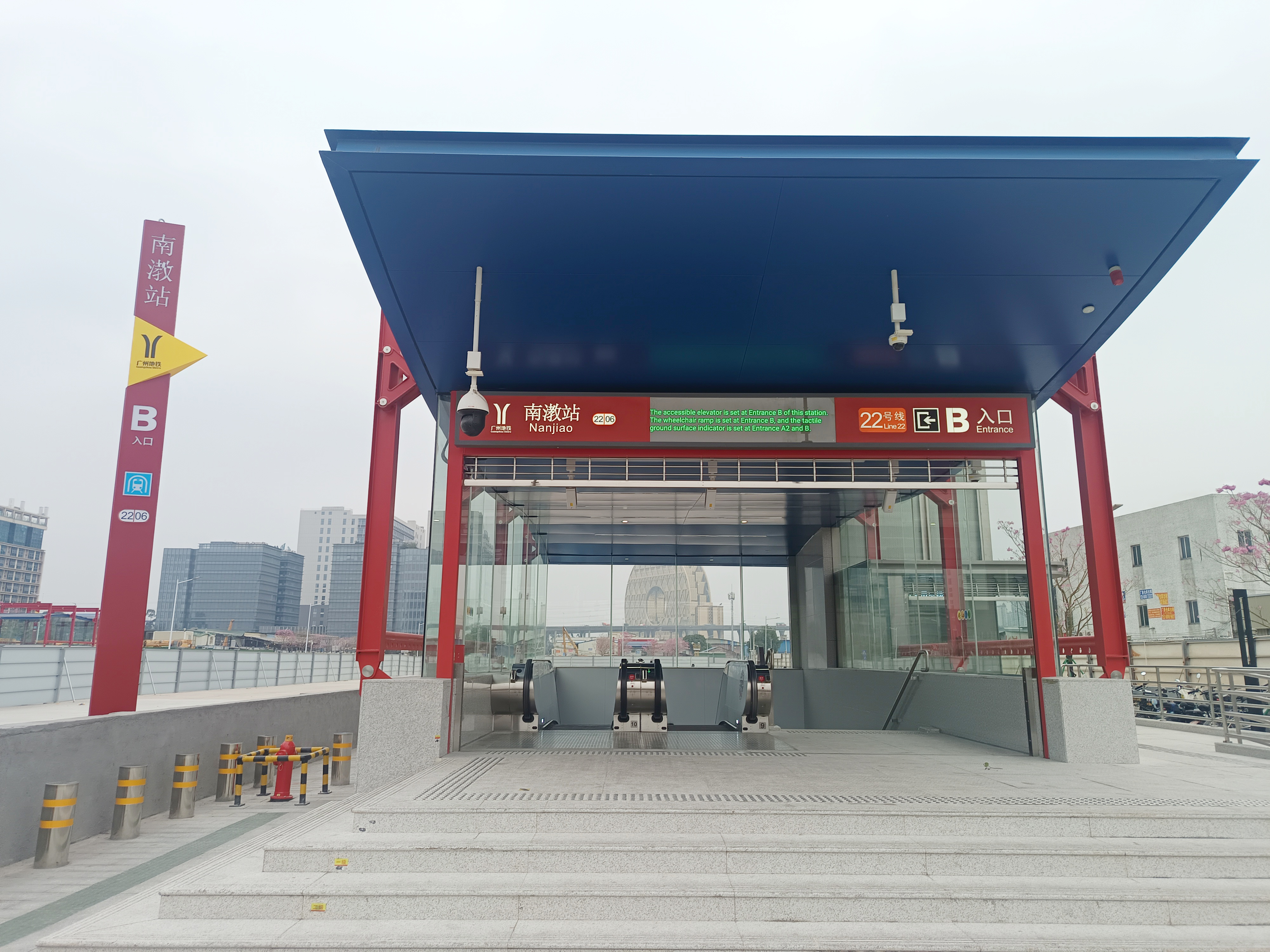
Entrance B

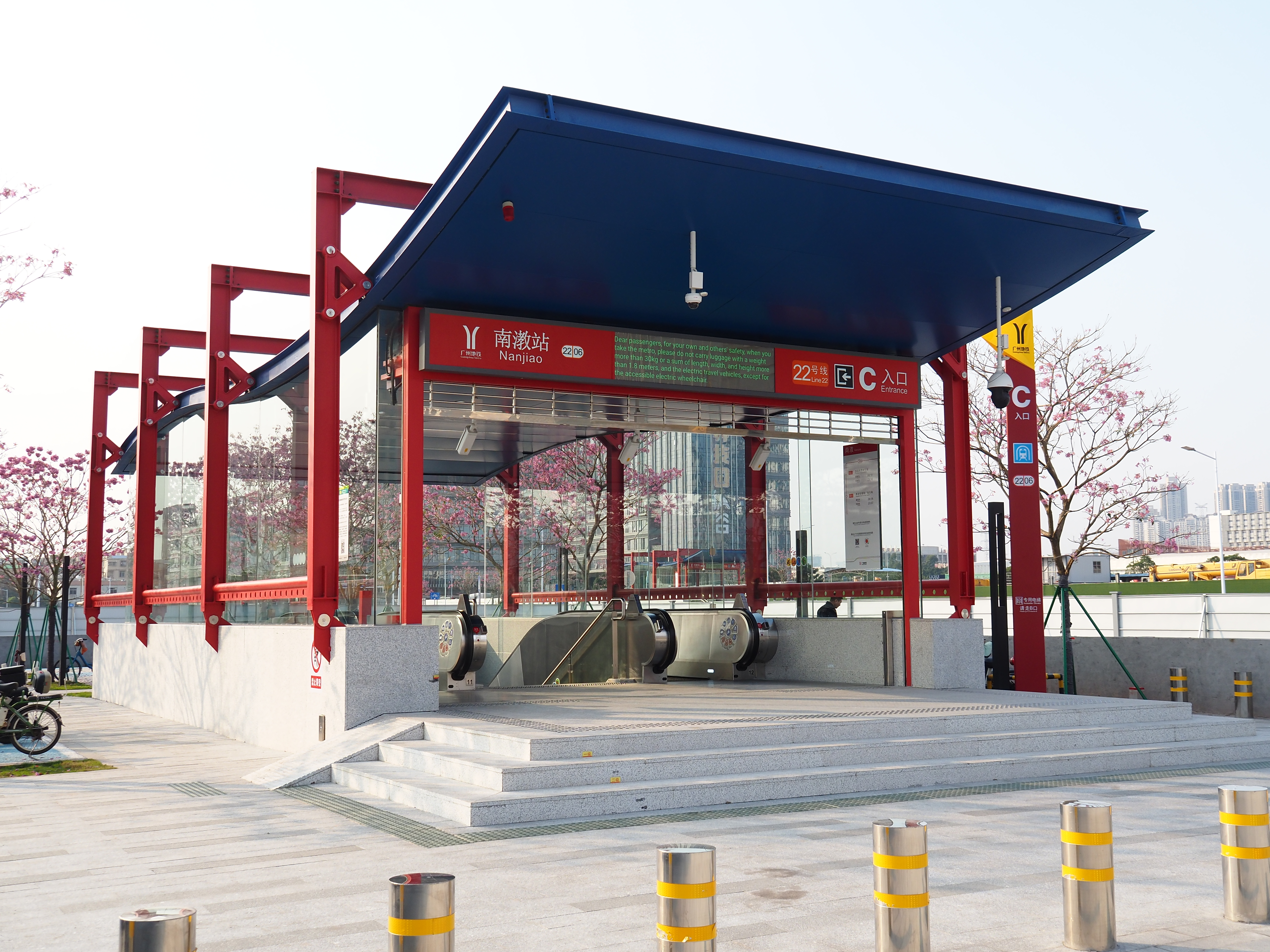
Entrance C

== History ==
This station was not included in the early stages of Line 22 planning. During the second environmental impact assessment in 2017, in order to meet the travel needs of the surrounding residents, the authorities proposed to build a new Dongsha Industrial Park Station on the north side of Fangcun Dongsha Port, which will be able to transfer to Foshan Metro Line 11 in the future. In the same year, the feasibility study of Line 22 was approved and this station was added as a reserved station, and it was later confirmed to be built together with the other stations. In June 2020, the station was named Nanjiao Station. The name was officially confirmed in July 2021.

At the end of April 2024, the station started the construction of mechanical and electrical equipment. In February 2025, the escalators were successfully installed at the station.

At the end of September 2025, the station completed the "three rights" transfer. On 29 December 2025, the station officially opened.
