= Chentougang station =

Guangzhou Metro station

Chentougang 陈头岗
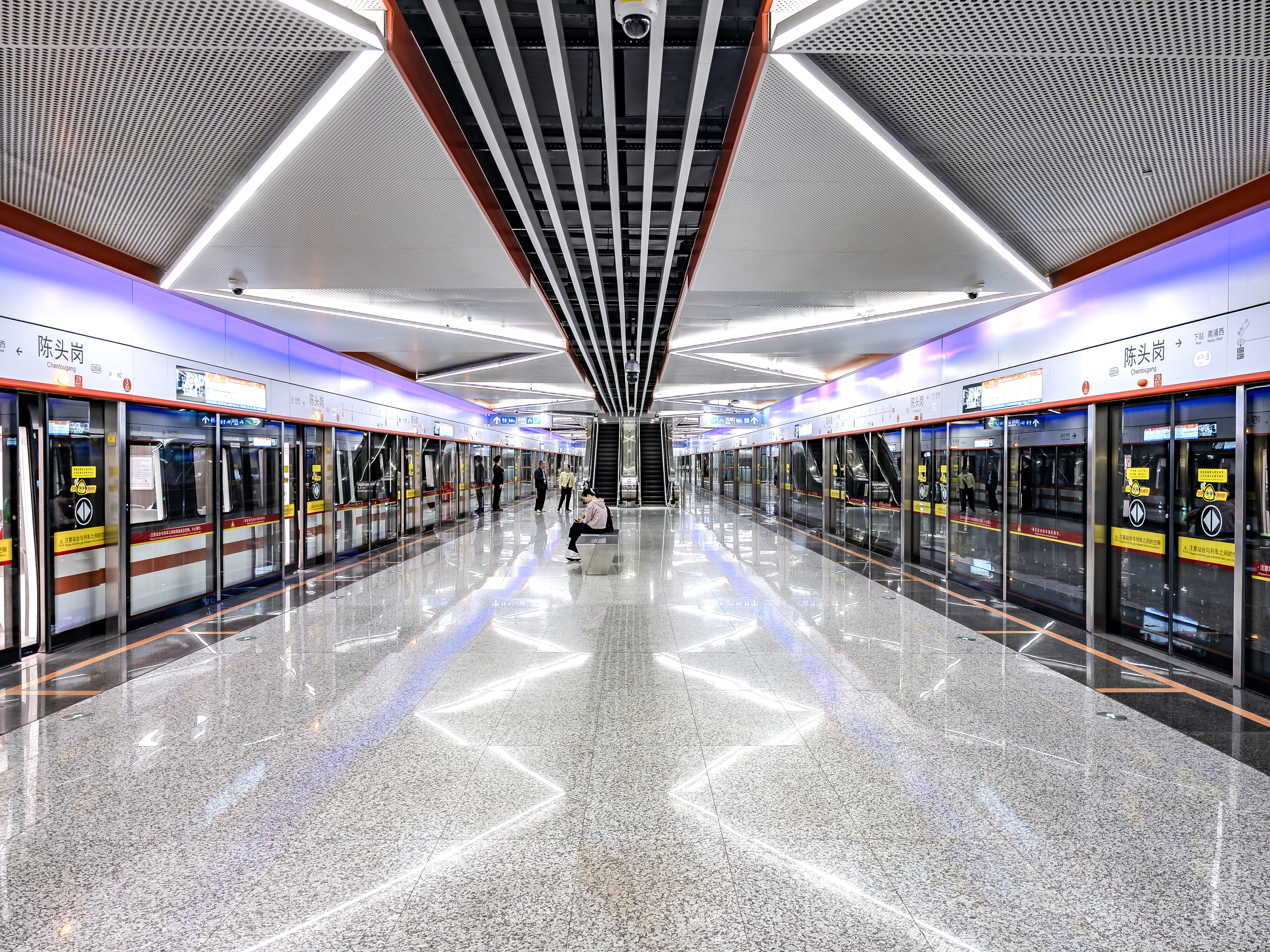
- Platforms 1 and 3

Chinese name
- Simplified Chinese: 陈头岗站
- Traditional Chinese: 陳頭崗站
Transcriptions
Standard Mandarin
- Hanyu Pinyin: Chéntóugǎng Zhàn
Yue: Cantonese
- Jyutping: chan^{4}tau^{4}gong^{1} zaam^{6}
- Hong Kong Romanization: Chan Tau Kong station

General information
- Location: Guangnan Expressway (广南快速路); Panyu District, Guangzhou, Guangdong; China
- Coordinates: 23.0162°N 113.2606°E
- Operated by: Guangzhou Metro Co. Ltd.
- Line: Line 22
- Platforms: 4 (2 island platforms)
- Tracks: 4

Construction
- Structure type: Underground
- Accessible: Yes

Other information
- Station code: 2204

History
- Opened: 31 March 2022; 4 years ago

Services
Preceding station	Guangzhou Metro	Following station
Nanpu West towards Fangcun	Line 22	Guangzhou South Railway Station towards Panyu Square
Location

Chentougang station (simplified Chinese: 陈头岗站; traditional Chinese: 陳頭崗站; Jyutping: can4 tau4 gong1 zaam6; Cantonese Yale: Chàhntàuhgōng Jaahm) is a station on Line 22 of the Guangzhou Metro. It started operations on 31 March 2022. It is situated underground at the Guangnan Expressway in Panyu District.It was the northern terminus of Line 22 until the Phase 1 remaining section to Fangcun opened on 29 December 2025.

== Station layout ==
G	-	Exit
L1; Concourse	Lobby	Ticket Machines, Customer Service, Shops, Police Station, Safety Facilities
L2; Platforms	Platform 3	22 towards Fangcun (Nanpu West)
L2; Platforms	Island platform (Toilets, Nursery)
L2; Platforms	Platform 1	22 towards Fangcun (Nanpu West)
L2; Platforms	Platform 2	22 towards Panyu Square (Guangzhou South Railway Station)
L2; Platforms	Island platform (Toilets, Nursery)
L2; Platforms	Platform 4	22 towards Panyu Square (Guangzhou South Railway Station)

== Exits ==
Chentougang station has 5 points of entry/exit, with Exit B1 being accessible via elevator.

- A1: Guangnan Expressway
- A2
- B1: Guangnan Expressway
- B2
- D: Guangnan Expressway
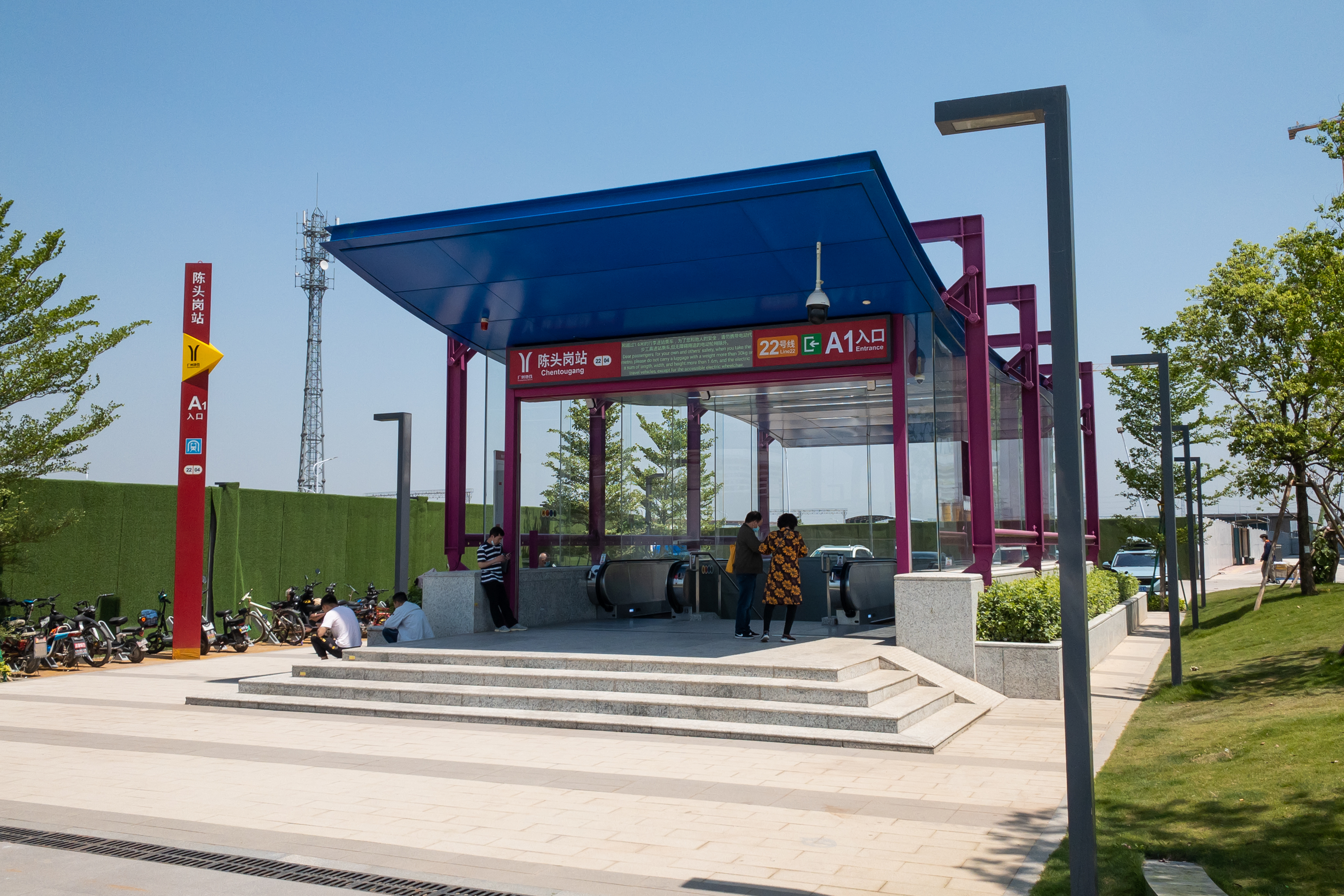
Exit A1

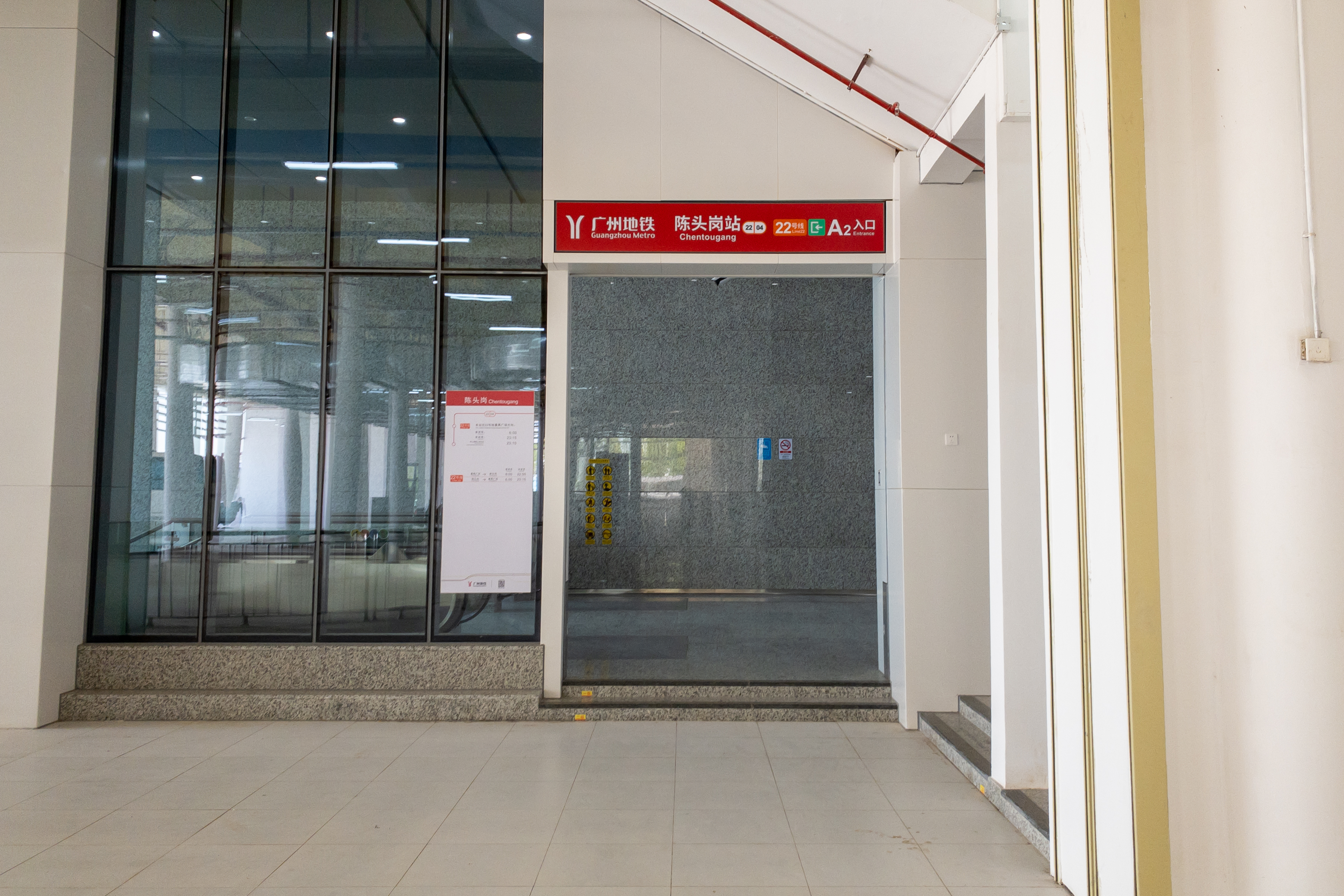
Exit A2

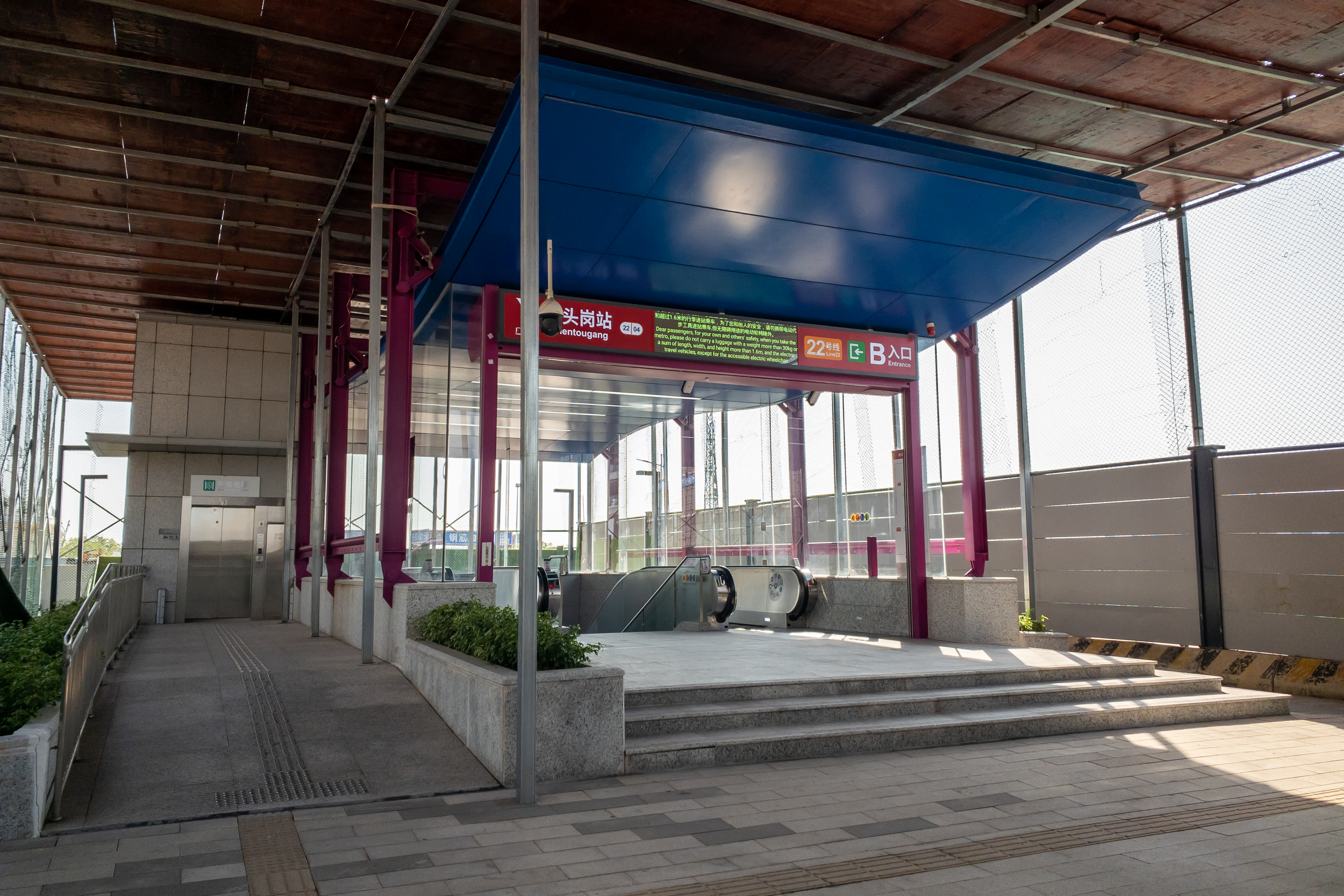
Exit B1

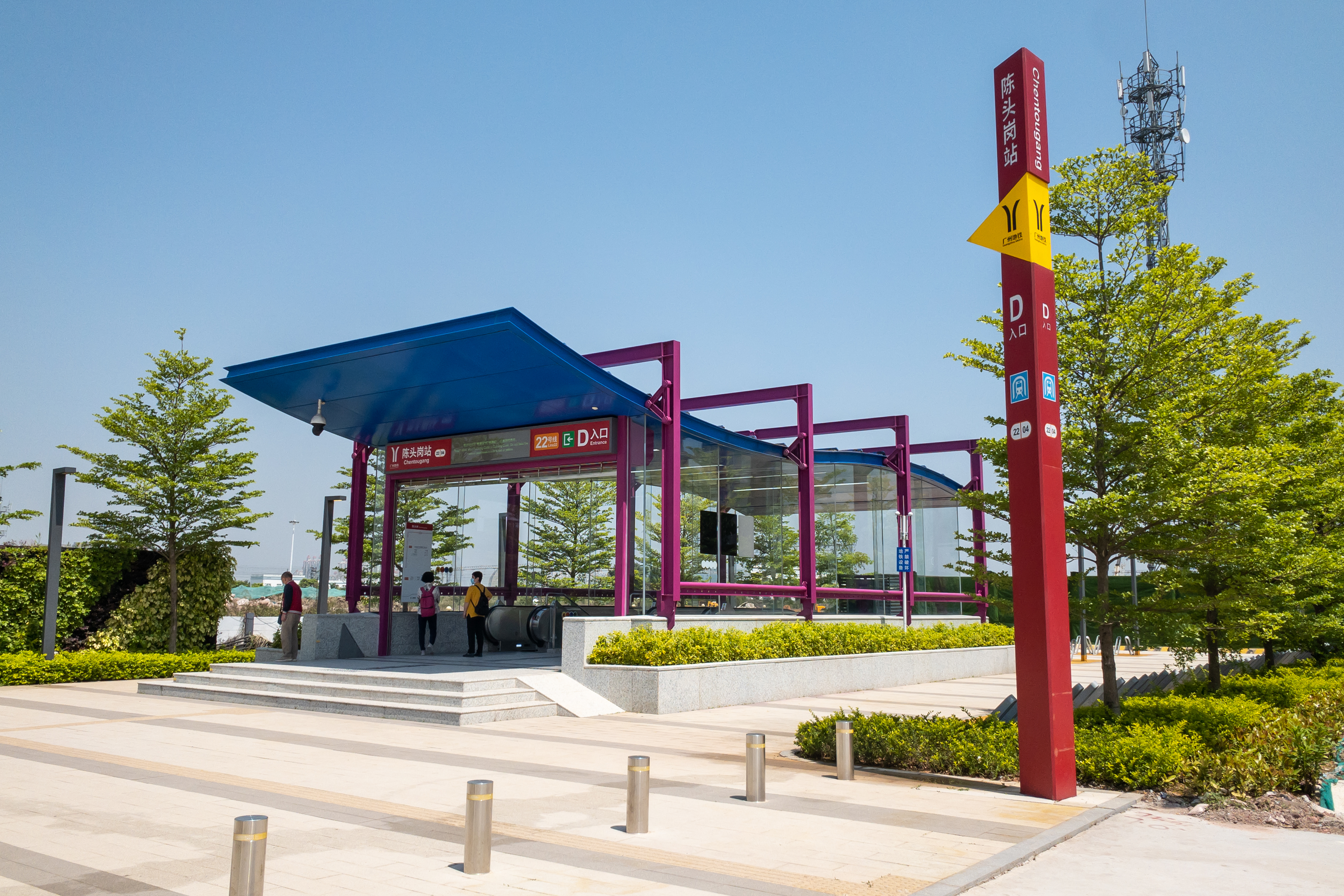
Exit D

== Gallery ==
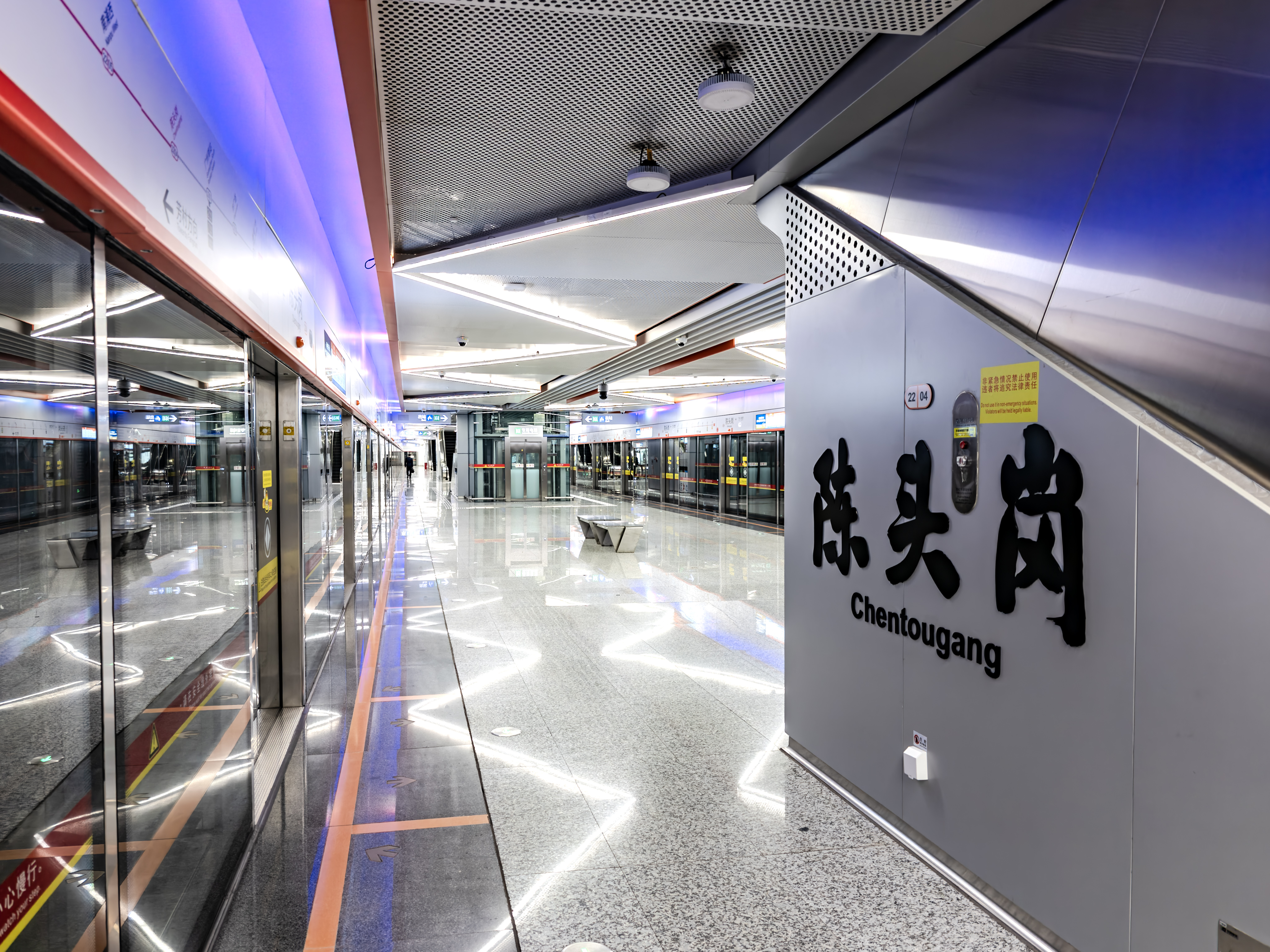
Platform 3

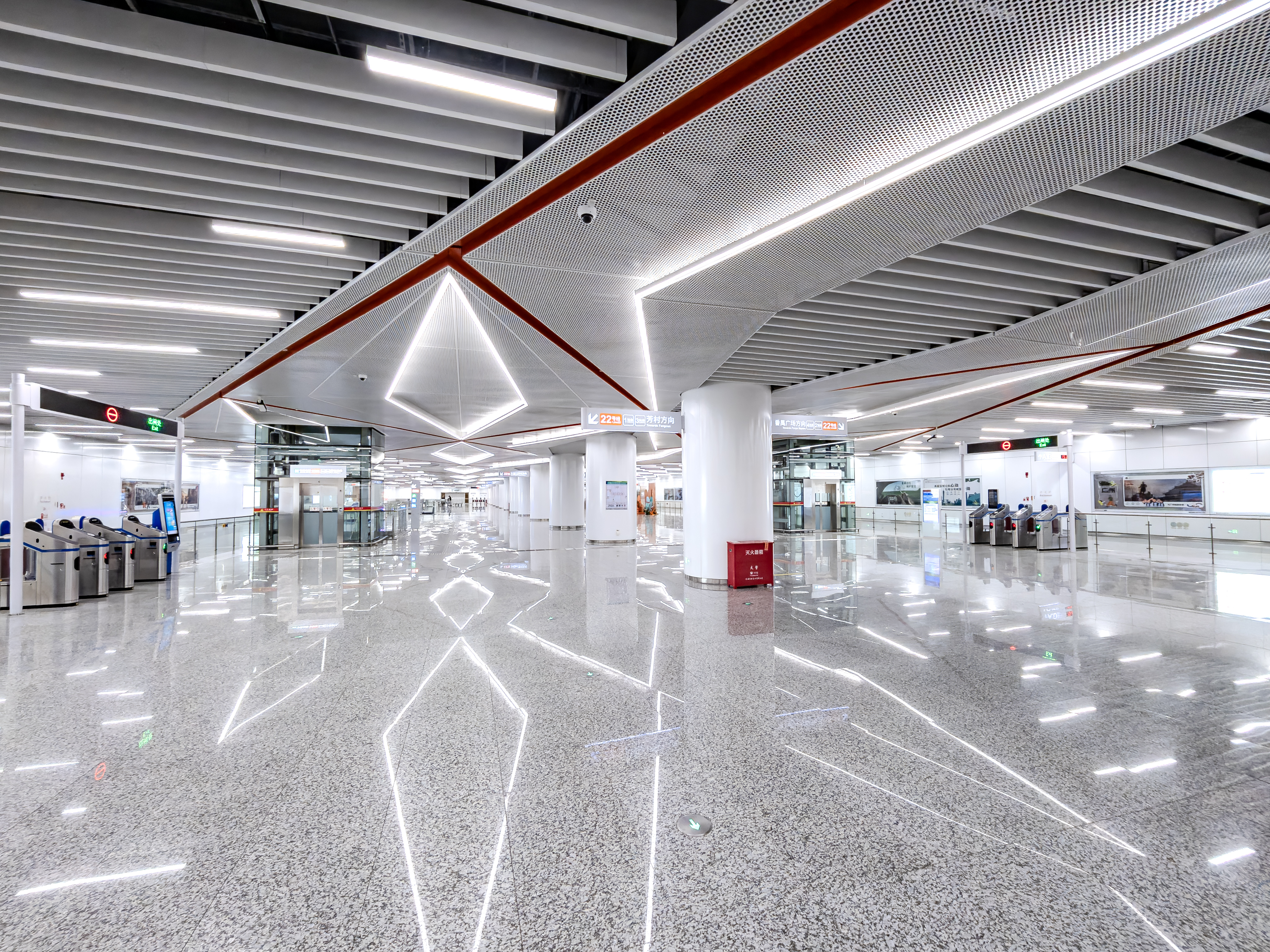
Concourse
