= Shiguanglu station =

Guangzhou Metro station

Shiguanglu 市广路
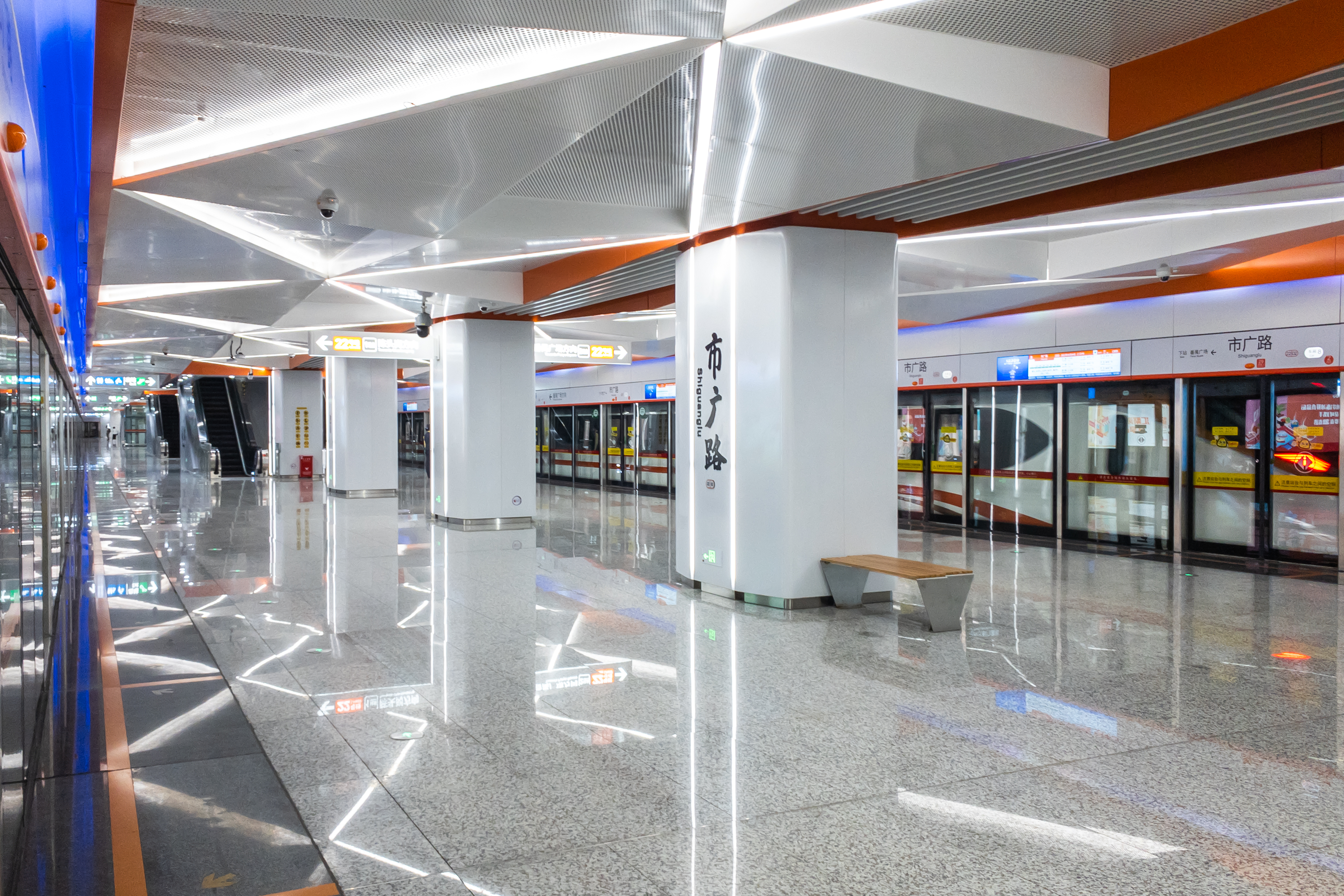
- Platform

Chinese name
- Simplified Chinese: 市广路站
- Traditional Chinese: 市廣路站
- Literal meaning: Shiqiao–Guangzhou Road station
Transcriptions
Standard Mandarin
- Hanyu Pinyin: Shìguǎnglù Zhàn
Yue: Cantonese
- Jyutping: si^{5}gwong^{2}lou^{6} zaam^{6}
- Hong Kong Romanization: Shi Kwong Road station

General information
- Other names: Qifu/Clifford (祈福), Panfu (番福)
- Location: Shiguang Road (市广路) and Jinshan Avenue (金山大道); Panyu District, Guangzhou, Guangdong; China
- Coordinates: 22.9740°N 113.3318°E
- Operated by: Guangzhou Metro Co. Ltd.
- Line: Line 22
- Platforms: 2 (1 island platform)
- Tracks: 4

Construction
- Structure type: Underground
- Accessible: Yes

Other information
- Station code: 2202

History
- Opened: 31 March 2022; 4 years ago

Services
Preceding station	Guangzhou Metro	Following station
Guangzhou South Railway Station towards Fangcun	Line 22	Panyu Square Terminus
Location

Shiguanglu Station (simplified Chinese: 市广路站; traditional Chinese: 市廣路站; Jyutping: si^{5}gwong^{2}lou^{6} zaam^{6}; Cantonese Yale: Síhgwóng Louh Jaahm; lit. 'Shiqiao–Guangzhou Road station') is a station on Line 22 of the Guangzhou Metro that began operations on 31 March 2022. It is situated underground at the west junction of Shiguang Road (Chinese: 市广路) and Jinshan Avenue (金山大道) in Guangzhou's Panyu District, located near the Clifford Estates (祈福新村) and Panyu Campus of the Guangdong University of Technology (Chinese: 广东工业大学).

== Station layout ==
G	-	Exit
L1; Concourse	Lobby	Ticket Machines, Customer Service, Shops, Police Station, Safety Facilities
L2; Platforms		22 Express Service passing loop (Not in use)
L2; Platforms	Platform 1	22 towards Fangcun (Guangzhou South Railway Station)
L2; Platforms	Island platform, doors will open on the left
L2; Platforms	Platform 2	22 towards Panyu Square (Terminus)
L2; Platforms		22 Express Service passing loop (Not in use)

== Exits ==
Exit number	Exit location
Exit A	Shiguang Lu
Exit B	Shiguang Lu
Exit C	Shiguang Lu

== Gallery ==
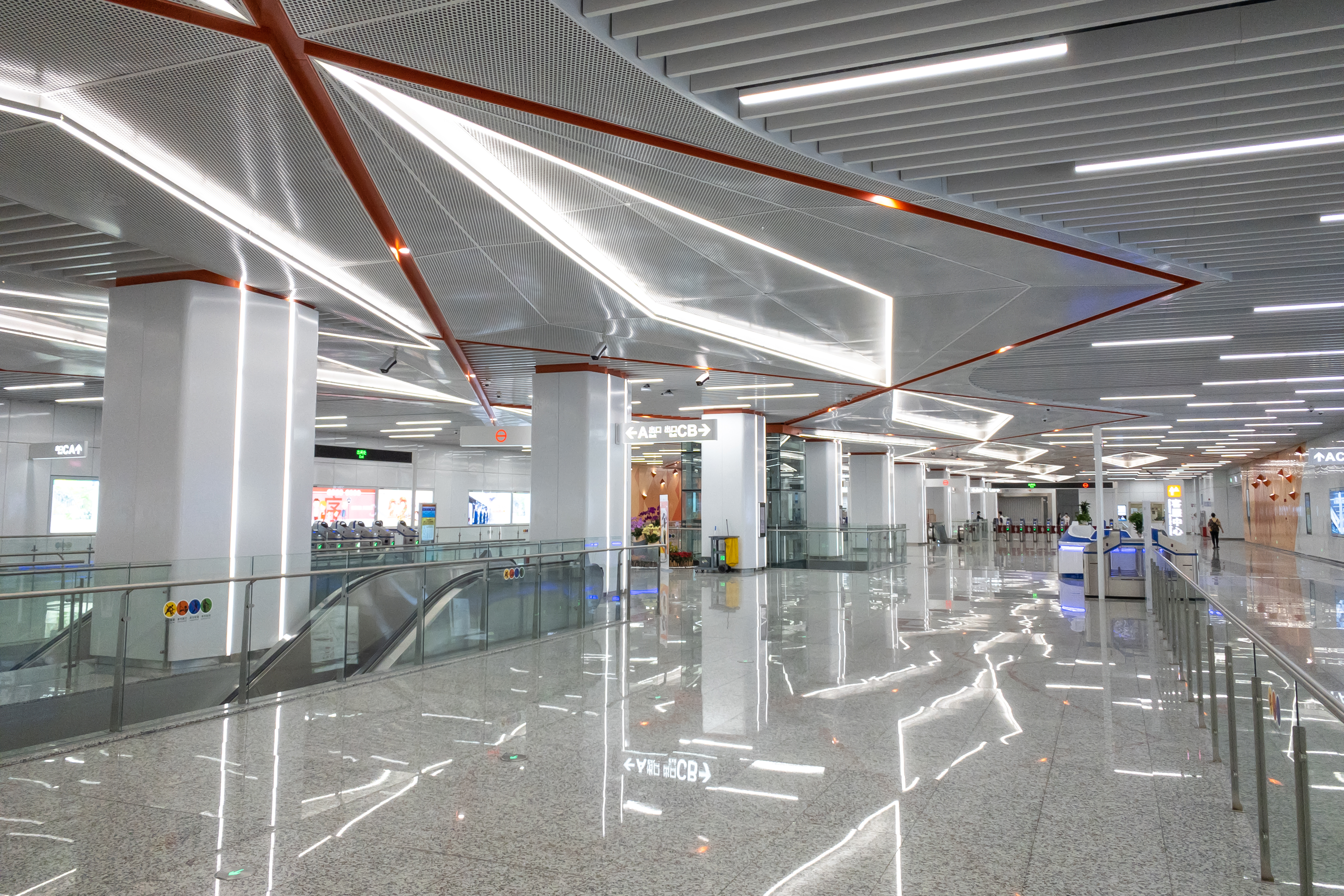
Concourse
