= Line 22 (Guangzhou Metro) =

Metro line in Guangzhou, China

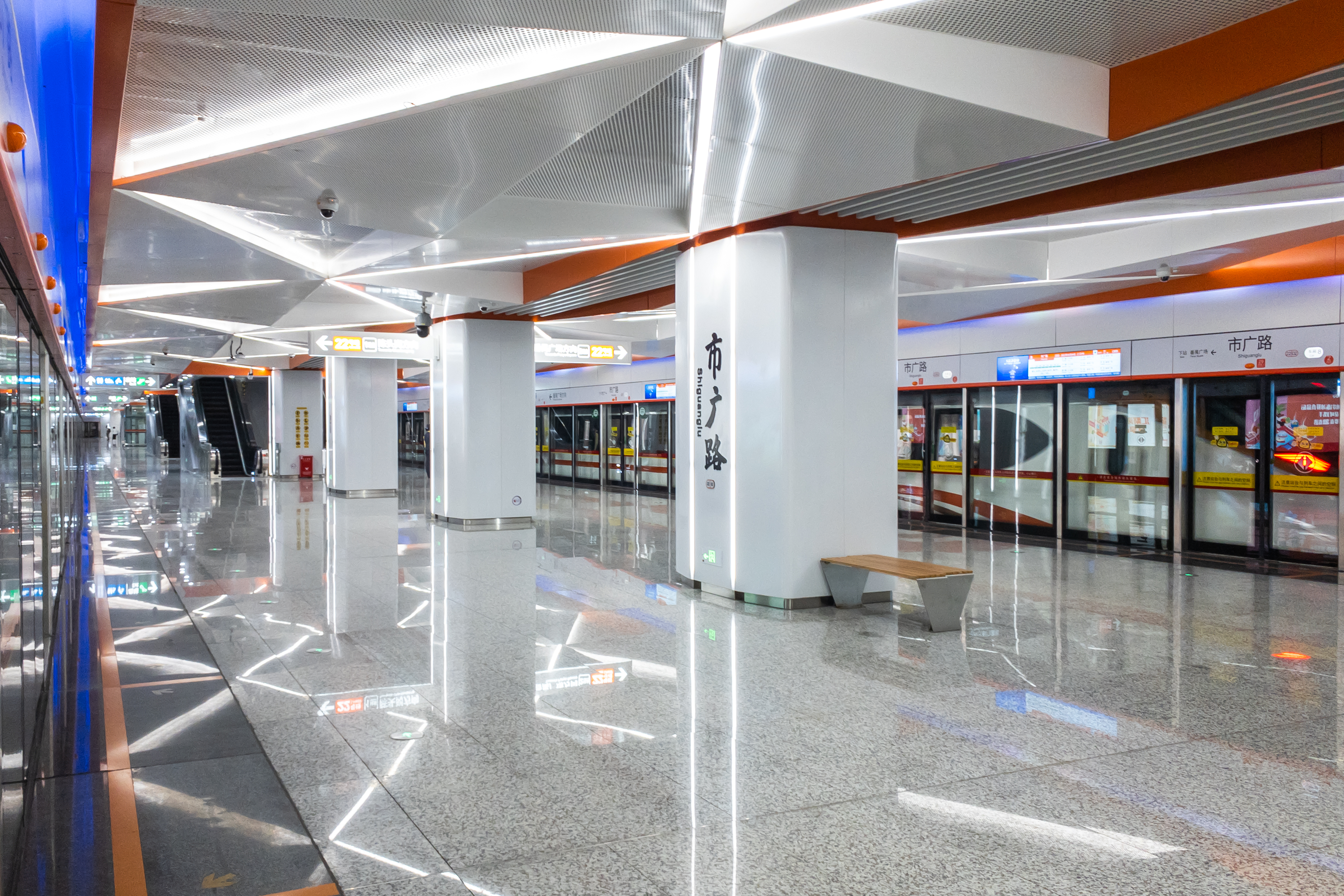
- Platform of Shiguanglu Station

Overview
- Other name: South station express line (Chinese: 南站快线)
- Status: Opened
- Owner: City of Guangzhou
- Locale: Panyu and Liwan districts Guangzhou, Guangdong
- Termini: Fangcun; Panyu Square
- Stations: 8
- Color on map: Orange-red (#cd5228)

Service
- Type: Rapid transit
- System: Guangzhou Metro
- Services: 1
- Operator(s): Guangdong Intercity (Wholly-owned subsidiary of Guangzhou Metro Corporation)
- Daily ridership: 60,200 (2025 daily average)

History
- Opened: 31 March 2022; 4 years ago (Panyu Square—Chentougang section)

Technical
- Line length: 18.2 km (11.3 mi) (Panyu Square—Chentougang section); 30.8 km (19.1 mi) (full Phase 1)
- Character: Underground
- Track gauge: 1,435 mm (4 ft 8 1/2 in)
- Electrification: 25 kV 50 Hz AC overhead catenary
- Operating speed: 160 km/h (99 mph)

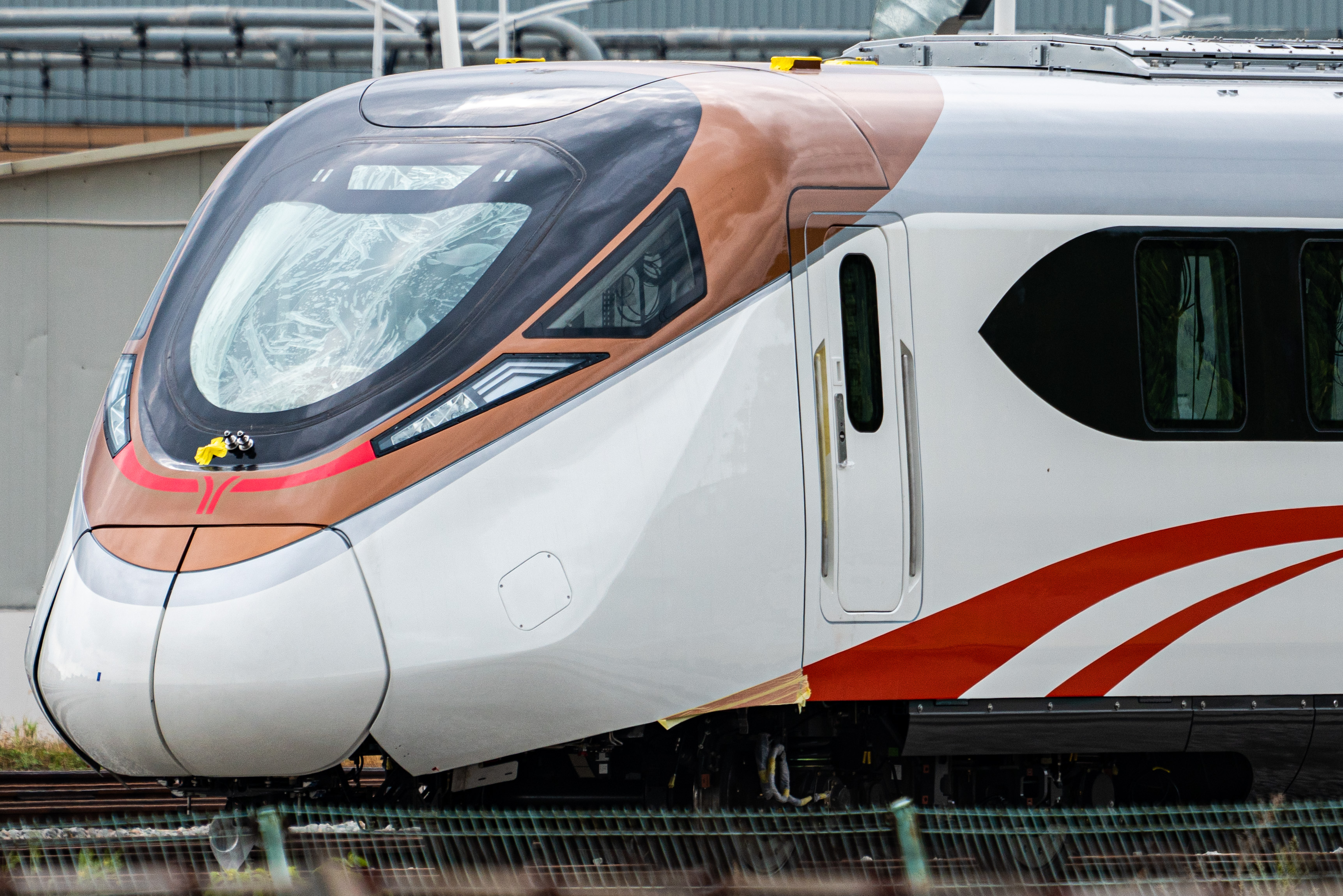
Line 22 train

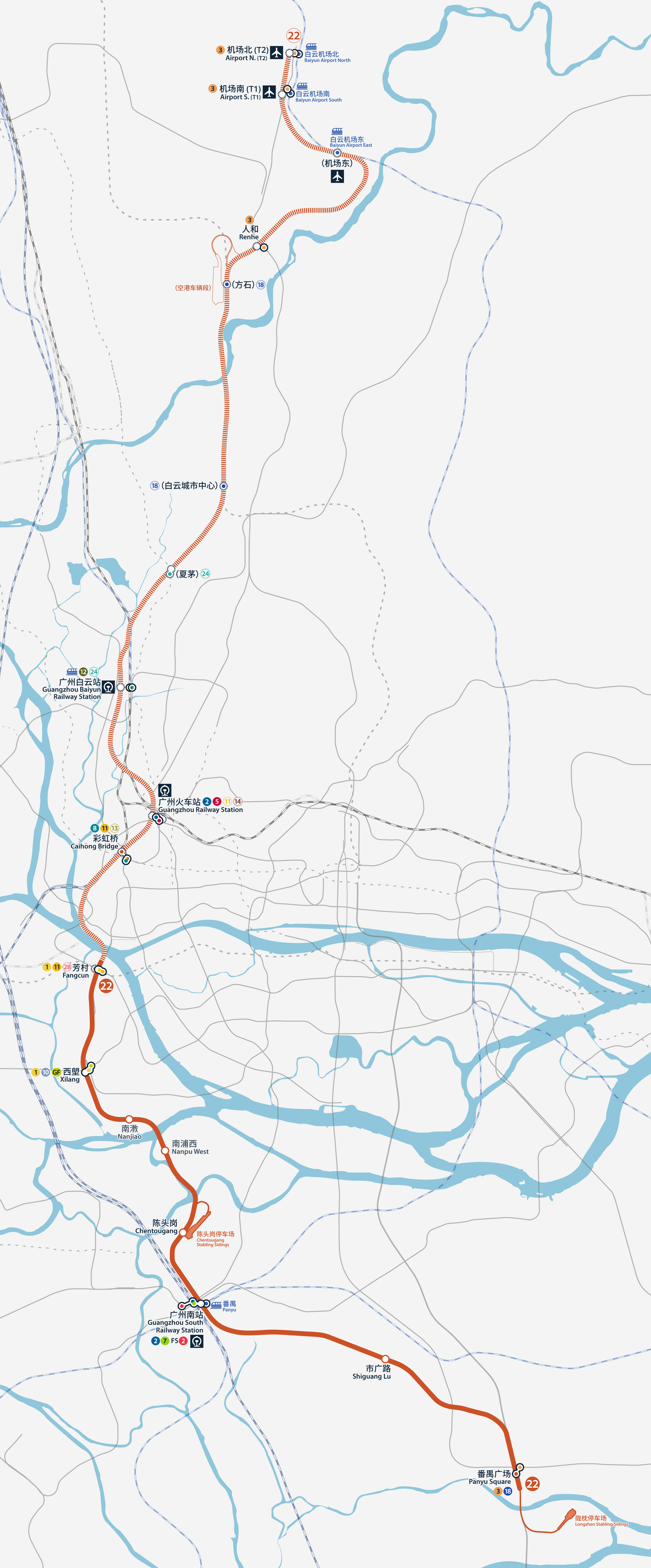
Line 22 drawn to scale

Line 22 of the Guangzhou Metro (simplified Chinese: 广州地铁22号线; traditional Chinese: 廣州地鐵22號線; Jyutping: gwong^{2} zau^{1} dei^{6} tit^{3} ji^{6} sap^{6} ji^{6} hou^{6} sin^{3}; pinyin: Guǎngzhōu Dìtiě Èrshí'èr Hào Xiàn) is a partially open rapid transit express line in Guangzhou with trains operating up to 160 km/h (99 mph). The current Phase 1 runs between Panyu Square and Fangcun, passing Guangzhou South Railway Station in Panyu District and Xilang and Fangcun in Liwan District in a north-south direction. Currently, there are train attendants on board each train. In the future, trains will operate fully driverless GoA4 mode when sufficient reliability from the signaling system has been confirmed.

== Service ==
=== Route ===
The line currently runs from Panyu Square to Fangcun. It was originally planned to interline with Line 18 south of Panyu Square, and track connections remain at Panyu Square to allow this.

The line is an express subway line using 8 car Type D trains with an operating speed of 160 km/h (99 mph). There is provision for future express services, with passing loops at some stations.

== History ==
=== Phase 1 ===
Phase 1 of Line 22 received planning approval in March 2017 as part of the Guangzhou Urban Rail Transit Phase III Construction Plan (2017-2023), running from Wanqingsha in Nansha District to Bai'etan (now renamed Fangcun to match the Line 1 station) in Liwan District. It was proposed the southern section between Wanqingsha and Panyu Square would interline with Line 18, however this did not eventuate and that section opened with Line 18 only.

Phase 1 eventually was split into two stages:

| Name | Segment | Commencement | Length | Station(s) |
|---|---|---|---|---|
| Phase 1 | Chentougang — Panyu Square | 31 March 2022 | 18.2 km (11.3 mi) | 4 |
| Phase 1 | Fangcun — Chentougang | 29 December 2025 | 11.5 km (7.1 mi) | 4 |

== Future ==
According to the long-term plan (2029–2051), Line 22 will be expanded both to the north and south from its current termini. The north extension will head to Airport North (Terminal 2) in Huadu District of Guangzhou while the southern extension will connect to Guangmingcheng railway station in Shenzhen, becoming an express line "connecting sea, land and air" with a total length of 128.8 kilometres (80.03 mi). The average passenger flow of the line when complete is predicted to exceed one million passengers per day.

=== North extension ===
The North extension of Line 22 will be 41.1 km (25.54 mi) in length with 10 new stations and be fully underground. The north extension will directly connect Guangzhou Baiyun Airport while passing through Guangzhou Railway Station and Guangzhou Baiyun Railway Station. On December 31, 2021, the North Extension started construction.

=== South extension ===
In 2019, Dongguan municipal government proposed Line 22 to be extended east beyond Panyu Square to Nansha Subdistrict and cross the Shiziyang Channel into Dongguan and beyond to Shajing Town in northern Bao'an District, Shenzhen. In 2020, Guangzhou Metro began soliciting bids to further investigate the extension of Line 22 into Dongguan and Shenzhen. The first section of this extension a 58.5 kilometres (36.35 mi) segment from Panyu Square to Chang'an, Dongguan were officially included in Guangdong's 14th Five Year Plan in 2021 with provisions for future extension and connection with the Shenzhen Metro. The extension to Shenzhen will connect Qingsheng, Jiaomen, Nansha Passenger Port, cross the Pearl River Estuary and extend to Dongguan and finally connect to Shenzhen Guangmingcheng High-speed Railway Station.

When complete a number of different services and express and local stopping patterns will be operated, including Shenzhen/Dongguan to Baiyun Station, Nansha Passenger Ferry Terminal to Baiyun Airport North, Nansha Passenger Port to Huachengjie, etc.

== Stations ==
Legend

- Opened
- Under construction

| Section | Station № | Station name | | Connections | Future Connections | Location |
| Section | Station № | English | Chinese | Connections | Future Connections | Location |
|---|---|---|---|---|---|---|
| North ext. | 2218 | Airport North (Terminal 2) | 机场北 | 3 330 ER | | Huadu |
| North ext. | 2217 | Airport South (Terminal 1) | 机场南 | 3 329 ER | | Huadu |
| North ext. | 2216 | Airport East (Terminal 3) | 机场东 | ER | | Baiyun |
| North ext. | 2215 | Renhe | 人和 | 3 327 | | Baiyun |
| North ext. | 2214 | Fangshi | 方石 | | 18 | Baiyun |
| North ext. | 2213 | Baiyun Urban Center | 白云城市中心 | | 18 | Baiyun |
| North ext. | 2212 | Xiamao | 夏茅 | | 24 | Baiyun |
| North ext. | 2211 | Guangzhou Baiyun Railway Station | 广州白云站 | 12 1205 GBA | 24 | Baiyun |
| North ext. | 2210 | Guangzhou Railway Station | 广州火车站 | 2 216; 5 506; GZQ | 11 1114 14 1401 | Yuexiu |
| North ext. | 2209 | Caihong Bridge | 彩虹桥 | 8 811; 11 1116 | 13 1309 | Liwan |
| Phase 1 | 2208 | Fangcun | 芳村 | 1 104; 11 1120 | | Liwan |
| Phase 1 | 2207 | Xilang | 西塱 | 1 101 10 1001; Guangfo GF18 | | Liwan |
| Phase 1 | 2206 | Nanjiao | 南漖 | | | Liwan |
| Phase 1 | 2205 | Nanpu West | 南浦西 | | | Panyu |
| Phase 1 | 2204 | Chentougang | 陈头岗 | | | Panyu |
| Phase 1 | 2203 | Guangzhou South Railway Station | 广州南站 | 2 201; 7 701; 2 F227; IZQ Guangzhu GSH; PYA Guangzhao GH ER | | Panyu |
| Phase 1 | 2202 | Shiguanglu | 市广路 | | | Panyu |
| Phase 1 | 2201 | Panyu Square | 番禺广场 | 3 301; 18 1803 | | Panyu |
