= Panyu Square station =

Guangzhou Metro station

Coordinates: 22.9357°N 113.3854°E

Panyu Square 番禺广场
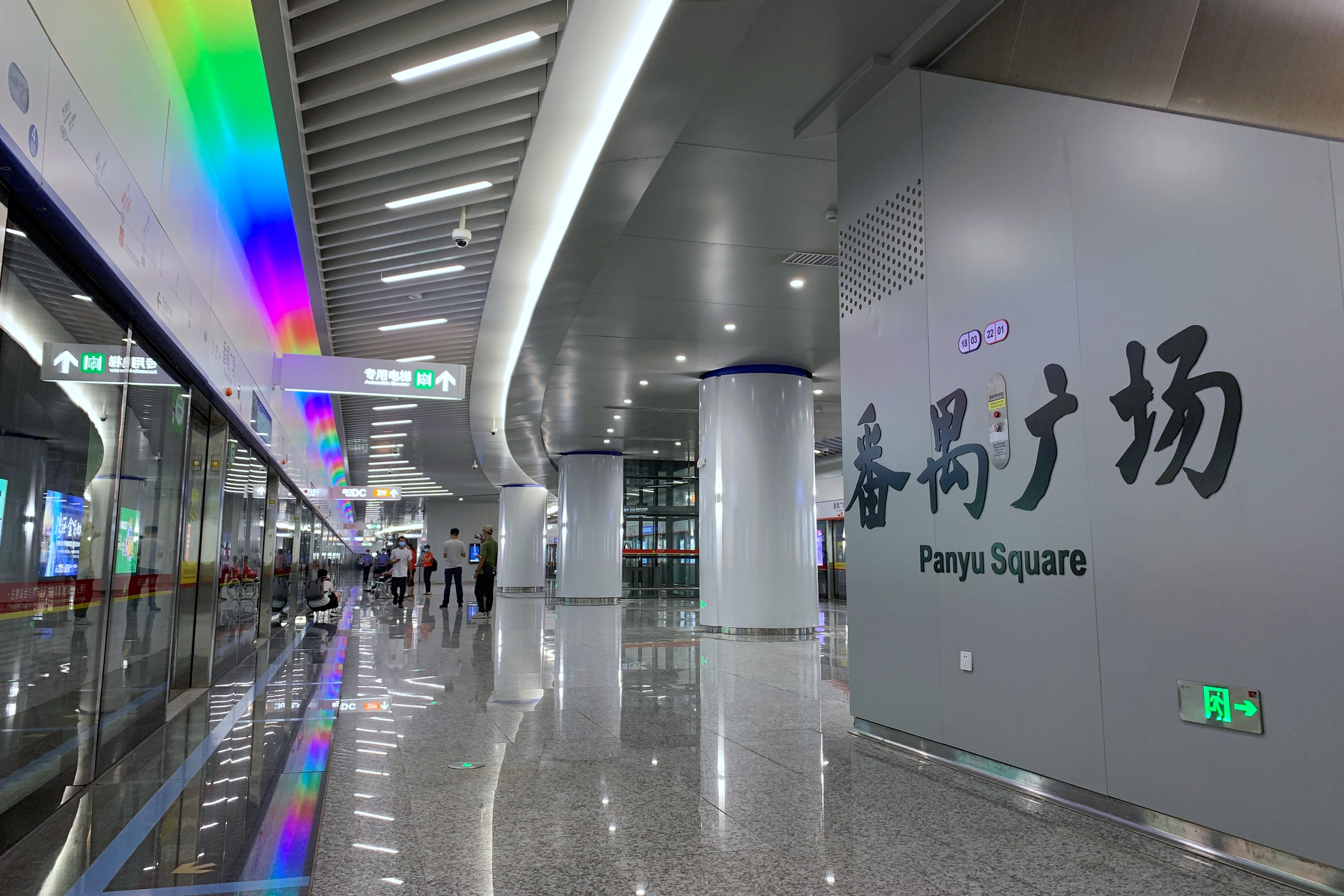
- Platform 4 (Line 18 southbound platform)

Chinese name
- Simplified Chinese: 番禺广场站
- Traditional Chinese: 番禺廣場站
- Postal: Punyu Square station
Transcriptions
Standard Mandarin
- Hanyu Pinyin: Pānyú Guǎngchǎng Zhàn
Yue: Cantonese
- Yale Romanization: Pūn'yùh Gwóngchèuhng Jaahm
- Jyutping: Pun^{1}jyu^{4} Gwong^{2}coeng^{4} Zaam^{6}

General information
- Location: Panyu District, Guangzhou, Guangdong; China
- Operated by: Guangzhou Metro Co. Ltd.
- Lines: Line 3 Line 18; Line 22
- Platforms: 6 (3 island platforms)
- Tracks: 6

Construction
- Structure type: Underground
- Accessible: Yes

Other information
- Station code: 301 1803 2201

History
- Opened: 30 December 2006; 19 years ago (Line 3); 28 September 2021; 4 years ago (Line 18); 31 March 2022; 4 years ago (Line 22)

Services
Preceding station	Guangzhou Metro	Following station
Bangjiang towards Haibang	Line 3	Shiqiao towards Airport North (Terminal 2) or Tianhe Coach Terminal
Nancun Wanbo towards Xiancun	Line 18	Hengli towards Wanqingsha
Shiguanglu towards Fangcun	Line 22	Terminus
Location

Panyu Square station (simplified Chinese: 番禺广场站; traditional Chinese: 番禺廣場站; Jyutping: faan^{1} jyu^{4} gwong^{2} coeng^{4} zaam^{6}; Cantonese Yale: Pūn'yùh Gwóngchèuhng Jaahm) is an interchange station between Line 3, Line 18 and Line 22 of the Guangzhou Metro. Line 3 started operation on December 30, 2006, Line 18 started operation on September 28, 2021 and Line 22 started operation on March 31, 2022. It is also the current southern terminus of Line 22.

The station is located under the junction of Donghuan Road (东环路) and East Qinghe Road (清河东路) in the Shiqiao Subdistrict, in Panyu District, Guangzhou. Panyu Square is a newly developed area to the south of Shiqiao, surrounded by the new Panyu District Government Building (新番禺区政府大楼), hotel and high-rise buildings.

Between April 16, 2022 and August 19, 2022, to provide easier access for passengers going from Line 22 in the direction of Xiancun on Line 18, all Line 22 trains only used platform 5, and platform 6 has been taken out of use as a reserved platform. Passengers for Wanqingsha on Line 18 had to pass through the transfer concourse to reach platform 4. This arrangement has been cancelled since August 20, 2022.

The station was the southern terminus of Line 3 until the eastern extension to Haibang opened on November 1, 2024.

== Station layout ==
G	Street level	Exits C-F, G1, H
L1; Concourse	Lobby	Ticket Machines, Customer Service, Shops, Police Station, Safety Facilities
L2; Equipment Area	-	Station equipment
L3; Platforms	Platform 1	3 towards Haibang (Bangjiang)
L3; Platforms	Island platform, doors will open on the left
L3; Platforms	Platform 2	3 towards Tianhe Coach Terminal or Airport North (Terminal 2) (Shiqiao)
L4; Concourse	Transfer Lobby	Transfer lobby between Lines 3 & 18
L5; Platforms	Platform 4	18 towards Wanqingsha (Hengli)
L5; Platforms	Island platform, doors will open on the left for 18 and right for 22
L5; Platforms	Platform 6	22 termination platform
L5; Platforms	Platform 5	22 towards Fangcun (Shiguanglu)
L5; Platforms	Island platform, doors will open on the left for 18 and right for 22
L5; Platforms	Platform 3	18 towards Xiancun (Nancun Wanbo)

== Exits ==
Exit number	Exit location
Exit A	(not open)
Exit C	Qinghe East Road
Exit D	Qinghe East Road
Exit E	Xingtai Road
Exit F	Guangchang East Road
Exit G1	Qinghe East Road
Exit H	Guangchang West Road

== Gallery ==
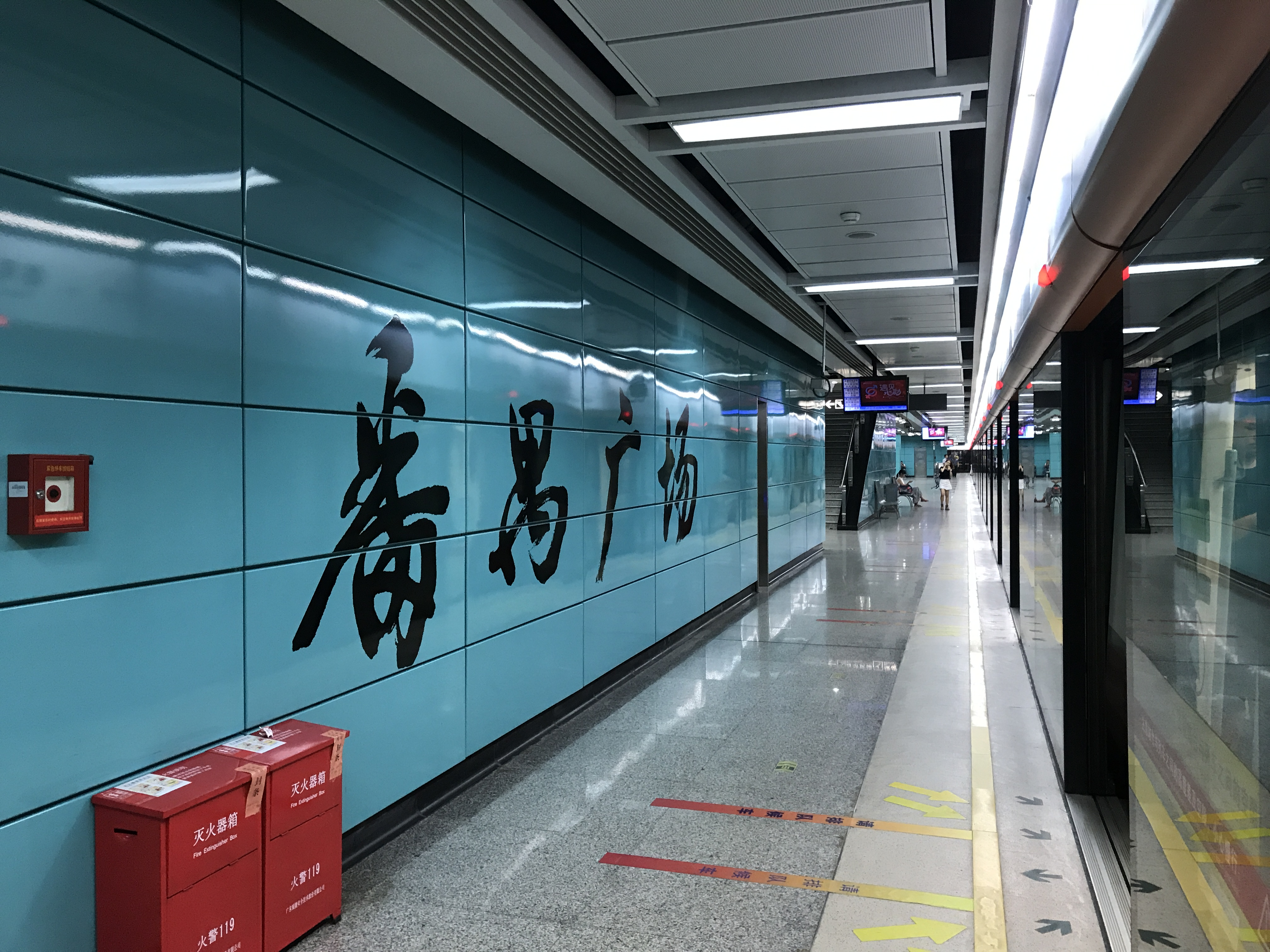
Platform 2 (Line 3 northbound platform)

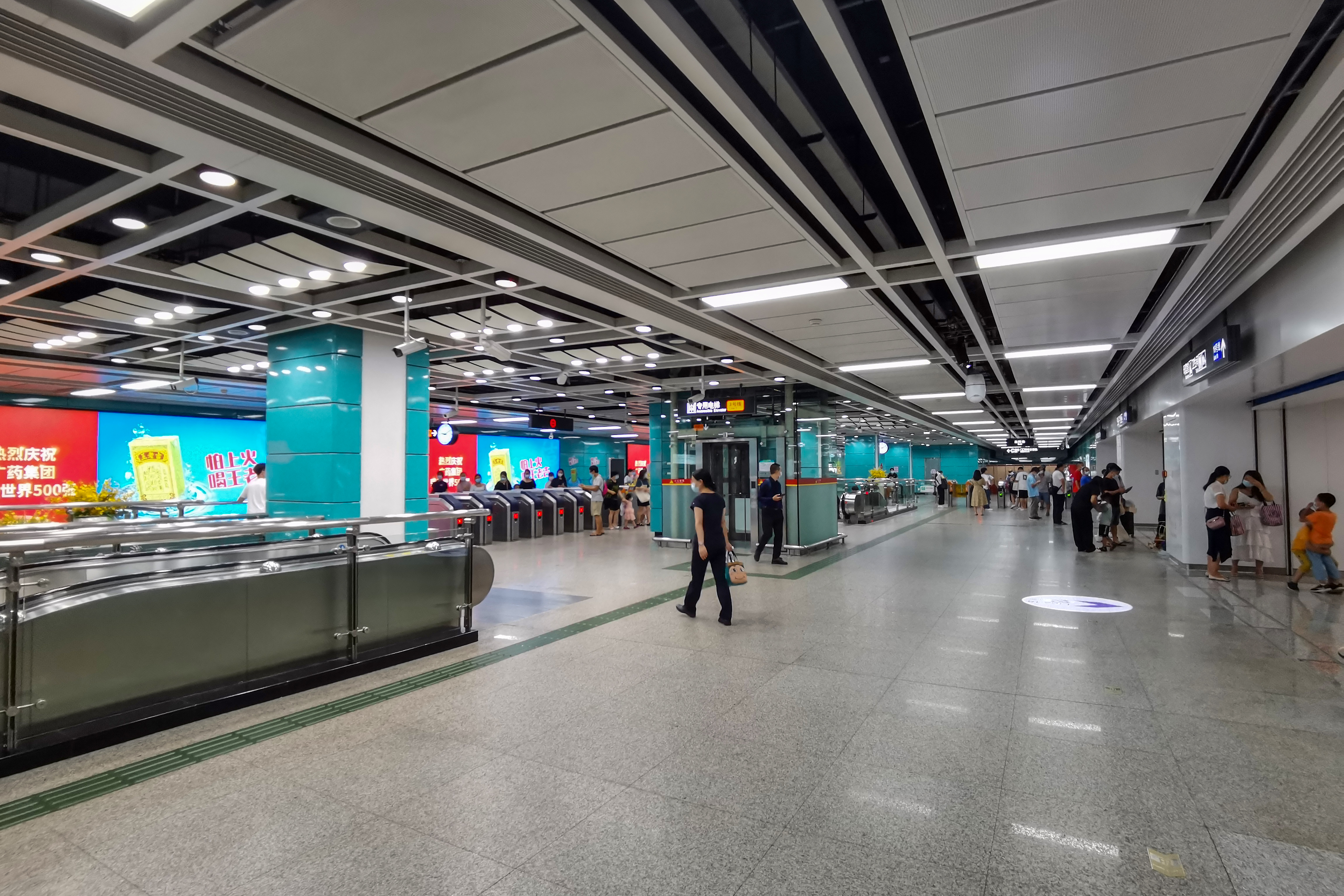
Line 3 concourse

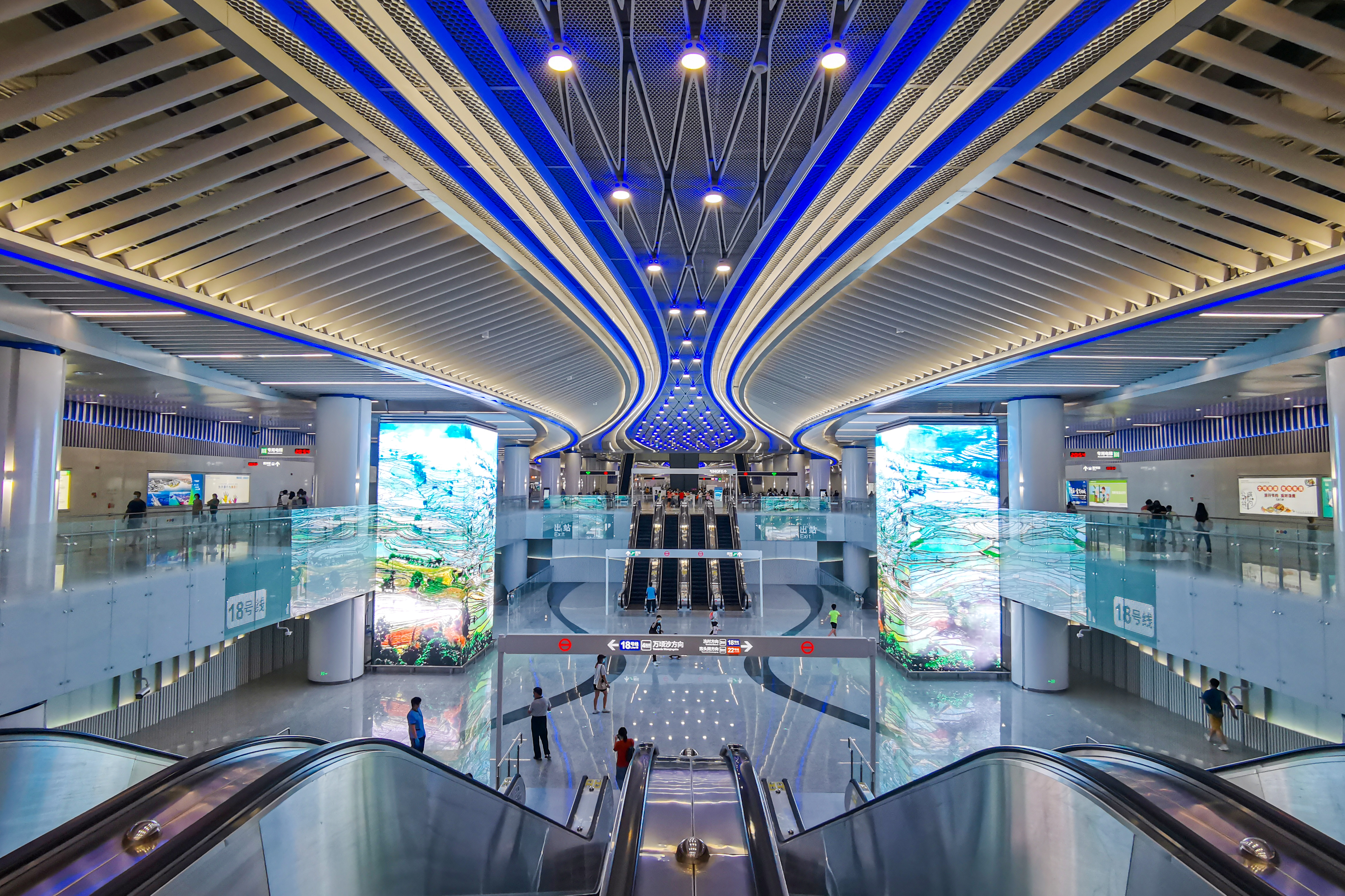
Lines 18 & 22 concourse (south-facing mezzanine)

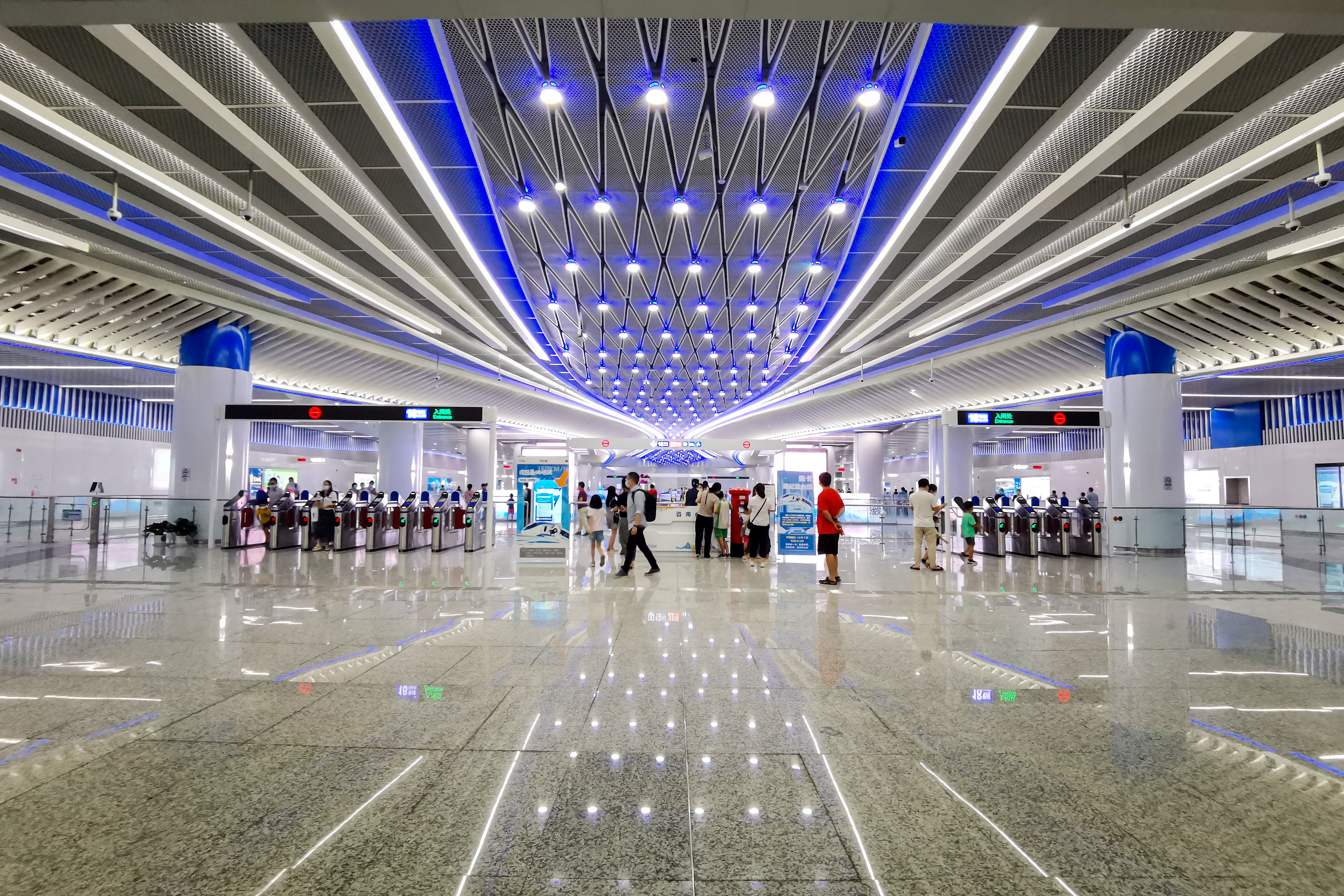
Lines 18 & 22 concourse (middle section)

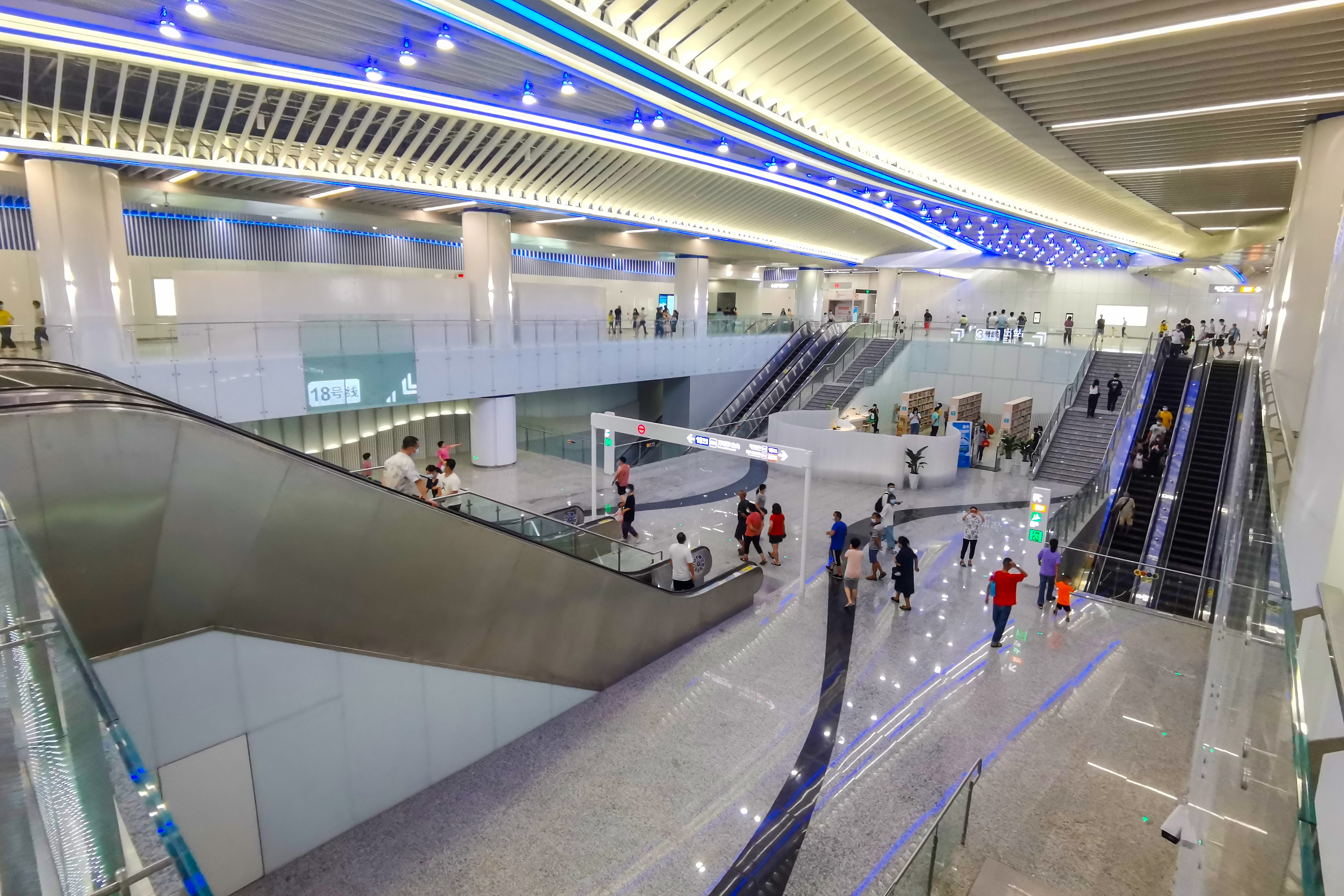
Lines 18 & 22 concourse (north-facing mezzanine)

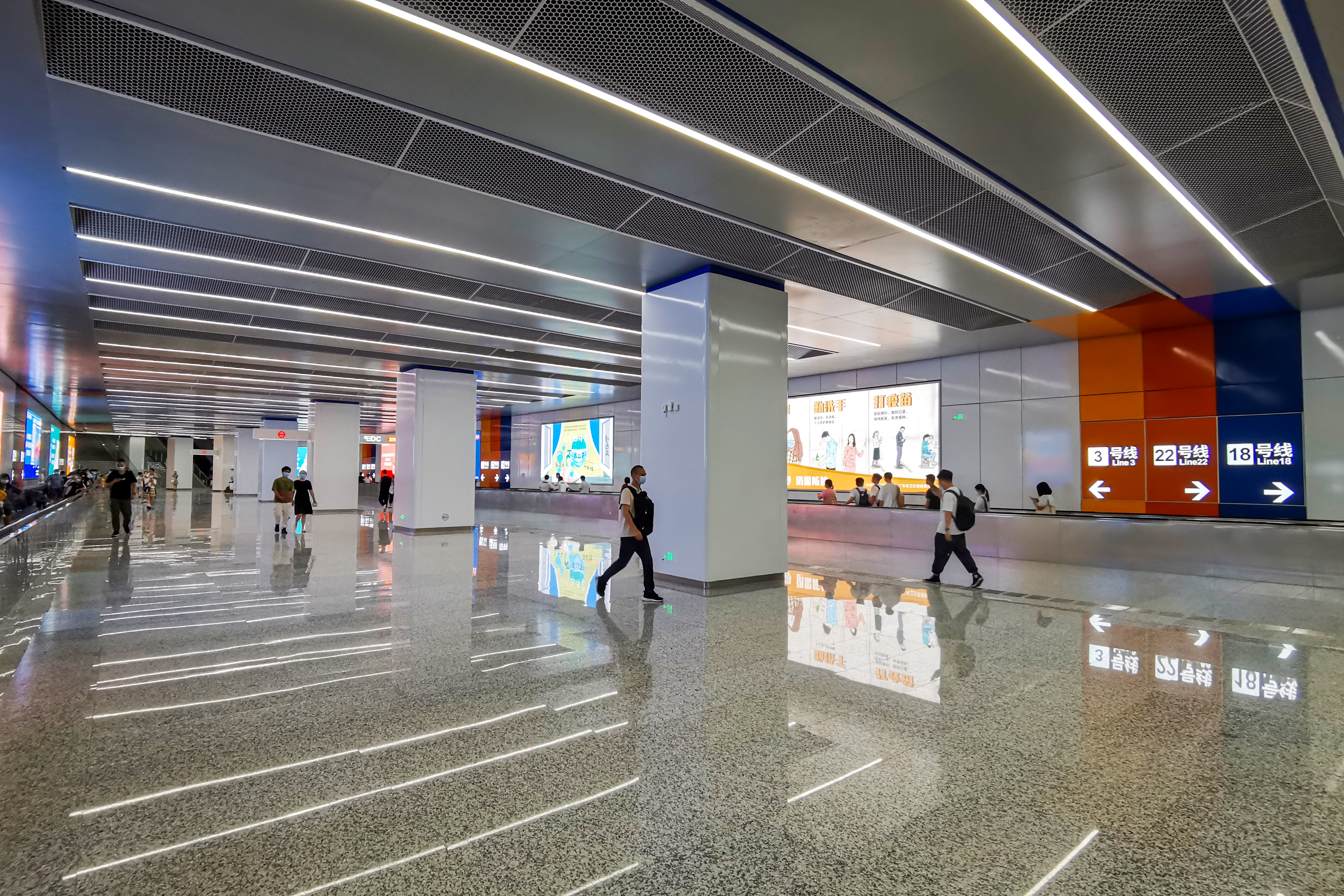
Transfer corridor

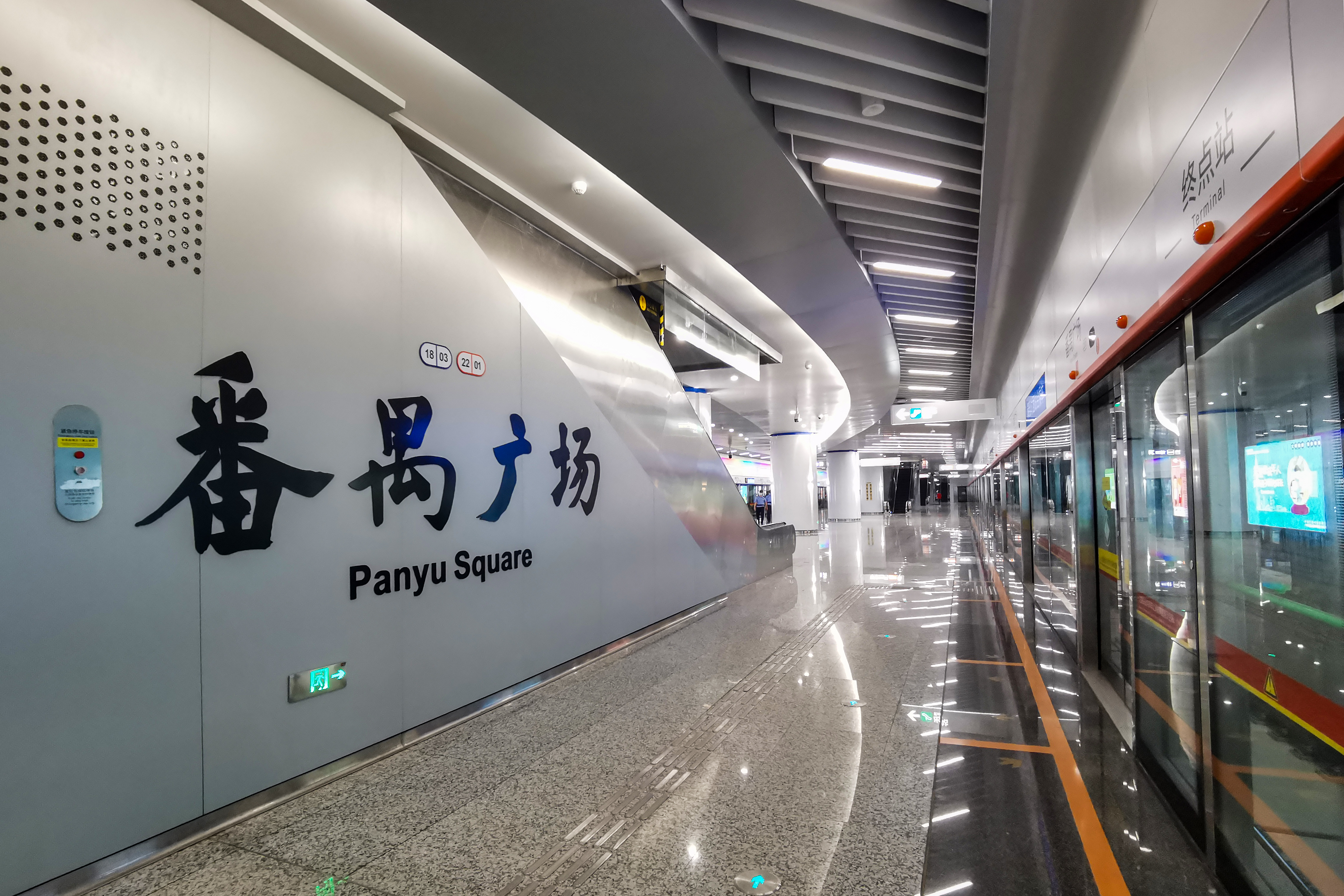
Platform 6 (Line 22 termination platform)
