= List of administrative divisions of Guangzhou =

Guangzhou a sub-provincial city, the second most populated prefectural-level division of People's Republic of China and it is divided into 11 districts. Guangzhou is further divided into 135 Subdistricts and 35 Towns.

== County-level divisions ==
Map	Name	Simplified Chinese	Hanyu Pinyin	Population (2010 census)	Area (km^{2})	Density (/km^{2})
	Yuexiu District	越秀区	Yuèxiù Qū	1,157,277	33.80	34,239
	Liwan District	荔湾区	Lìwān Qū	898,204	59.10	15,198
	Haizhu District	海珠区	Hǎizhū Qū	1,558,663	90.40	17,242
	Tianhe District	天河区	Tiānhé Qū	1,432,431	96.33	14,870
	Baiyun District	白云区	Báiyún Qū	2,222,658	795.79	2,793
	Huangpu District	黄埔区	Huángpù Qū	831,600	484.17	1,717
	Panyu District	番禺区	Pānyú Qū	1,764,869	786.15	2,245
	Huadu District	花都区	Huādū Qū	945,053	970.04	974
	Nansha District	南沙区	Nánshā Qū	259,899	527.65	493
	Zengcheng District	增城区	Zēngchéng Qū	1,036,731	1,616.47	641
	Conghua District	从化区	Cónghuà Qū	593,415	1,974.50	301
	Total			12,700,800	7,434.40	1,708

== Township-level divisions ==
=== Yuexiu ===
Name	Chinese (S)	Hanyu Pinyin	Canton Romanization
Baiyun Subdistrict	白云街道	Báiyún Jiēdào	bag6 wen4 gai1 dou6
Beijing Subdistrict	北京街道	Běijīng Jiēdào	beg1 ging1 gai1 dou6
Dadong Subdistrict	大东街道	Dàdōng Jiēdào	dai6 dung1 gai1 dou6
Datang Subdistrict	大塘街道	Dàtáng Jiēdào	dai6 tong4 gai1 dou6
Daxin Subdistrict	大新街道	Dàxīn Jiēdào	dai6 sen1 gai1 dou6
Dengfeng Subdistrict	登峰街道	Dēngfēng Jiēdào	deng1 fung1 gai1 dou6
Dongfeng Subdistrict	东风街道	Hōngfēng Jiēdào	dung1 fung1 gai1 dou6
Dongshan Subdistrict	东山街道	Dōngshān Jiēdào	dung1 san1 gai1 dou6
Guangta Subdistrict	光塔街道	Guāngtǎ Jiēdào	guong1 tab3 gai1 dou6
Guangwei Subdistrict	广卫街道	Guǎngwèi Jiēdào	guong2 wei6 gai1 dou6
Hongqiao Subdistrict	洪桥街道	Hóngqiáo Jiēdào	hung4 kiu4 gai1 dou6
Huale Subdistrict	华乐街道	Huálè Jiēdào	wa4 log6 gai1 dou6
Huanghuagang Subdistrict	黄花岗街道	Huánghuāgāng Jiēdào	wong4 fa1 gong1 gai1 dou6
Jianshe Subdistrict	建设街道	Jiànshè Jiēdào	gin3 qid3 gai1 dou6
Kuangquan Subdistrict	矿泉街道	Kuàngquán Jiēdào	kong3 qun4 gai1 dou6
Liuhua Subdistrict	流花街道	Liúhuā Jiēdào	leo4 fa1 gai1 dou6
Liurong Subdistrict	六榕街道	Liùróng Jiēdào	lug6 yung4 gai1 dou6
Meihuacun Subdistrict	梅花村街道	Méihuācūn Jiēdào	mui4 fa1 qun1 gai1 dou6
Nonglin Subdistrict	农林街道	Nónglín Jiēdào	nung4 lem4 gai1 dou6
Renmin Subdistrict	人民街道	Rénmín Jiēdào	yen4 men4 gai1 dou6
Shishu Subdistrict	诗书街道	Shīshū Jiēdào	xi1 xu1 gai1 dou6
Zhuguang Subdistrict	珠光街道	Zhūguāng Jiēdào	ju1 guong1 gai1 dou6

=== Liwan ===
Name	Chinese (S)	Hanyu Pinyin	Canton Romanization
Jinhua Subdistrict	金花街道	Jīnhuā Jiēdào	gem1 fa1 gai1 dou6
Shamian Subdistrict	沙面街道	Shāmiàn Jiēdào	sa1 min2 gai1 dou6
Hualin Subdistrict	华林街道	Huálín Jiēdào	wa4 lem4 gai1 dou6
Duobao Subdistrict	多宝街道	Duōbǎo Jiēdào	do1 bou2 gai1 dou6
Changhua Subdistrict	昌华街道	Chānghuá Jiēdào	cêng1 wa4 gai1 dou6
Fengyuan Subdistrict	逢源街道	Féngyuán Jiēdào	fung4 yun4 gai1 dou6
Longjin Subdistrict	龙津街道	Lóngjīn Jiēdào	lung4 zên1 gai1 dou6
Caihong Subdistrict	彩虹街道	Cǎihóng Jiēdào	coi2 hung4 gai1 dou6
Nanyuan Subdistrict	南源街道	Nányuán Jiēdào	nam4 yun4 gai1 dou6
Xicun Subdistrict	西村街道	Xicūn Jiēdào	sei1 qun1 gai1 dou6
Zhanqian Subdistrict	站前街道	Zhànqián Jiēdào	zam6 qin4 gai1 dou6
Lingnan Subdistrict	岭南街道	Lǐngnán Jiēdào	ling5 nam4 gai1 dou6
Qiaozhong Subdistrict	桥中街道	Qiáozhōng Jiēdào	kiu4 zung1 gai1 dou6
Chongkou Subdistrict	冲口街道	Chōngkǒu Jiēdào	cung1 heo2 gai1 dou6
Huadi Subdistrict	花地街道	Huādì Jiēdào	fa1 déi2 gai1 dou6
Chajiao Subdistrict	茶滘街道	Chájiào Jiēdào	ca4 geo3 gai1 dou6
Hailong Subdistrict	海龙街道	Hǎilóng Jiēdào	hoi2 lung4 gai1 dou6
Zhongnan Subdistrict	中南街道	Zhōngnán Jiēdào	zung1 nam4 gai1 dou6
Dongjiao Subdistrict	东漖街道	Dōngjiào Jiēdào	dung1 gao3 gai1 dou6
Dongsha Subdistrict	东沙街道	Dōngshā Jiēdào	dung1 Shā gai1 dou6
Baihedong Subdistrict	白鹤洞街道	Báihèdòng Jiēdào	bag6 hog6 dung6 gai1 dou6
Shiweitang Subdistrict	石围塘街道	Shíwéitáng Jiēdào	ség6 wei4 tong4 gai1 dou6

=== Haizhu ===
Name	Chinese (S)	Hanyu Pinyin	Canton Romanization
Haichuang Subdistrict	海幢街道	Hǎichuáng Jiēdào	hoi2 cong4 gai1 dou6
Chigang Subdistrict	赤岗街道	Chìgǎng Jiēdào	cég3 gong1 gai1 dou6
Xingang Subdistrict	新港街道	Xīngǎng Jiēdào	sen1 gong2 gai1 dou6
Binjiang Subdistrict	滨江街道	Bīnjiāng Jiēdào	ben1 gong1 gai1 dou6
Sushe Subdistrict	素社街道	Sùshè Jiēdào	sou3 se5 gai1 dou6
Nanhuaxi Subdistrict	南华西街道	Nánhuáxī Jiēdào	nam4 wa4 sei1 gai1 dou6
Longfeng Subdistrict	龙凤街道	Lóngfèng Jiēdào	lung4 fung6 gai1 dou6
Shayuan Subdistrict	沙园街道	Shāyuán Jiēdào	sa1 yun4 gai1 dou6
Ruibao Subdistrict	瑞宝街道	Ruìbǎo Jiēdào	sêu 6bou2 gai1 dou6
Jianghai Subdistrict	江海街道	Jiānghǎi Jiēdào	gong1 hoi2 gai1 dou6
Fengyang Subdistrict	凤阳街道	Fèngyáng Jiēdào	fung6 yêng4 gai1 dou6
Nanshitou Subdistrict	南石头街道	Nánshítou Jiēdào	nam4 ség6 teo4 gai1 dou6
Huazhou Subdistrict	华洲街道	Huázhōu Jiēdào	wa4 zeo1 gai1 dou6
Changgang Subdistrict	昌岗街道	Chānggǎng Jiēdào	cêng1 gong1 gai1 dou6
Nanzhou Subdistrict	南洲街道	Nánzhōu Jiēdào	nam4 zeo1 gai1 dou6
Pazhou Subdistrict	琶洲街道	Pázhōu Jiēdào	pa4 zeo1 gai1 dou6
Guanzhou Subdistrict	官洲街道	Guānzhōu Jiēdào	gun1 zeo1 gai1 dou6
Jiangnanzhong Subdistrict	江南中街道	Jiāngnánzhōng Jiēdào	gong1 nam4 zung1 gai1 dou6

=== Tianhe ===
Name	Chinese (S)	Hanyu Pinyin	Canton Romanization
Tianyuan Subdistrict	天园街道	Tiānyuán Jiēdào	tin1 yun4 gai1 dou6
Wushan Subdistrict, Guangzhou	五山街道	Wǔshān Jiēdào	ng5 san1 gai1 dou6
Yuancun Subdistrict	员村街道	Yuáncūn Jiēdào	yun4 qun1 gai1 dou6
Chebei Subdistrict	车陂街道	Chēbēi Jiēdào	cé1 béi1 gai1 dou6
Shahe Subdistrict	沙河街道	Shāhé Jiēdào	sa1 ho4 gai1 dou6
Shipai Subdistrict	石牌街道	Shípái Jiēdào	ség6 pai4 gai1 dou6
Xinghua Subdistrict	兴华街道	Xìnghuá Jiēdào	hing1 wai4 gai1 dou6
Shadong Subdistrict	沙东街道	Shādōng Jiēdào	sa1 dung1 gai1 dou6
Linhe Subdistrict	林和街道	Línhé Jiēdào	lem4 wo4 gai1 dou6
Tangxia Subdistrict	棠下街道	Tángxià Jiēdào	tong4 ha6 gai1 dou6
Liede Subdistrict	猎德街道	Lièdé Jiēdào	lib6 deg1 gai1 dou6
Xiancun Subdistrict	冼村街道	Xiǎncūn Jiēdào	xin2 qun1 gai1 dou6
Yuangang Subdistrict	元岗街道	Yuángǎng Jiēdào	yun4 gong1 gai1 dou6
Tianhenan Subdistrict	天河南街道	Tiānhénán Jiēdào	tin6 ho4 gai1 dou6
Huangcun Subdistrict	黄村街道	Huángcūn Jiēdào	wong4 qun1 gai1 dou6
Longdong Subdistrict	龙洞街道	Lóngdòng Jiēdào	lung4 dung6 gai1 dou6
Changxing Subdistrict	长兴街道	Zhǎngxìng Jiēdào	cêng4 hing1 gai1 dou6
Fenghuang Subdistrict	凤凰街道	Fènghuáng Jiēdào	fung6 wong4 gai1 dou6
Qianjin Subdistrict	前进街道	Qiánjìn Jiēdào	qin4 zên3 gai1 dou6
Zhuji Subdistrict	珠吉街道	Zhūjí Jiēdào	ju1 ged1 gai1 dou6
Xīntang Subdistrict	新塘街道	Xīntáng Jiēdào	sen1 tong4 gai1 dou6

=== Baiyun ===
Name	Chinese (S)	Hanyu Pinyin	Canton Romanization
Jingtai Subdistrict	景泰街道	Jǐngtài Jiēdào	ging2 tai3 gai1 dou6
Songzhou Subdistrict	松洲街道	Sōngzhōu Jiēdào	cung4 zeo1 gai1 dou6
Tongde Subdistrict	同德街道	Tóngdé Jiēdào	tung4 deg1 gai1 dou6
Huangshi Subdistrict	黄石街道	Huángshí Jiēdào	wong4 ség6 gai1 dou6
Tangjing Subdistrict	棠景街道	Tángjǐng Jiēdào	tong4 ging2 gai1 dou6
Xinshi Subdistrict	新市街道	Xīnshì Jiēdào	san1 si5 gai1 dou6
Sanyuanli Subdistrict	三元里街道	Sānyuánlǐ Jiēdào	sam1 yun4 léi5 gai1 dou6
Tonghe Subdistrict	同和街道	Tónghé Jiēdào	tung4 wo4 gai1 dou6
Jingxi Subdistrict	京溪街道	Jīngxī Jiēdào	ging1 kei1 gai1 dou6
Yongping Subdistrict	永平街道	Yǒngpíng Jiēdào	wing5 ping4 gai1 dou6
Junhe Subdistrict	均禾街道	Jūnhé Jiēdào	gai1 dou6
Jinsha Subdistrict	金沙街道	Jīnshā Jiēdào	gem1 sa1 gai1 dou6
Shijing Subdistrict	石井街道	Shíjǐng Jiēdào	ség6 zéng2 gai1 dou6
Jiahe Subdistrict	嘉禾街道	Jiāhé Jiēdào	gaa1 wo4 gai1 dou6
Renhe Town	人和镇	Rénhé Zhèn	yen4 wo4 zen3
Taihe Town	太和镇	Tàihé Zhèn	tai3 wo4 zen3
Jianggao Town	江高镇	Jiānggāo Zhèn	gong1 gou1 zen3
Zhongluotan Town	钟落潭镇	Zhōngluòtán Zhèn	zung1 log6 tam4 zen3

=== Huangpu ===
Name	Chinese (S)	Hanyu Pinyin	Canton Romanization
Dasha Subdistrict	大沙街道	Dàshā Jiēdào	dai6 sa1 gai1 dou6
Huangpu Subdistrict	黄埔街道	Huángbù Jiēdào	wong4 bou3 gai1 dou6
Hongshan Subdistrict	红山街道	Hóngshān Jiēdào	hung4 san1 gai1 dou6
Yuzhu Subdistrict	鱼珠街道	Yúzhū Jiēdào	jyu4 zyu1 gai1 dou6
Wenchong Subdistrict	文冲街道	Wénchōng Jiēdào	men4 cung1 gai1 dou6
Nangang Subdistrict	南岗街道	Nángǎng Jiēdào	nam4 gong1 gai1 dou6
Changzhou Subdistrict	长洲街道	Chángzhōu Jiēdào	cêng4 zeo1 gai1 dou6
Suidong Subdistrict	穗东街道	Suìdōng Jiēdào	sêu6 dung1 gai1 dou6
Lilian Subdistrict	荔联街道	Lìlián Jiēdào	lei6 lün4 gai1 dou6
Luogang Subdistrict	萝岗街道	Luógǎng Jiēdào	lo4 gong1 gai1 dou6
Xiagang Subdistrict	夏港街道	Xiàgǎng Jiēdào	ha6 gong2 gai1 dou6
Dongqu	东区街道	Dōngqū Jiēdào	dung1 kêu1 gai1 dou6
Lianhe Subdistrict	联和街道	Liánhé Jiēdào	lün4 wo4 gai1 dou6
Yonghe Subdistrict	永和街道	Yǒnghé Jiēdào	wing5 wo4 gai1 dou6
Jiulong Town	九龙镇	Jiǔlóng Zhèn	geo2 lung4 zen3

=== Panyu ===
Name	Chinese (S)	Hanyu Pinyin	Canton Romanization
Shiqiao Subdistrict	市桥街道	Shìqiáo Jiēdào	xi5 kiu4 gai1 dou6
Zhongcun Subdistrict	钟村街道	Zhōngcūn Jiēdào	zung1 qun1 gai1 dou6
Shibi Subdistrict	石壁街道	Shíbì Jiēdào	ség6 big1 gai1 dou6
Dashi Subdistrict	大石街道	Dàshí Jiēdào	dai6 ség6 gai1 dou6
Luopu Subdistrict	洛浦街道	Luòpǔ Jiēdào	log6 pou2 gai1 dou6
Dalong Subdistrict	大龙街道	Dàlóng Jiēdào	dai6 lung4 gai1 dou6
Donghuan Subdistrict	东环街道	Dōnghuán Jiēdào	dung1 wan4 gai1 dou6
Qiaonan Subdistrict	桥南街道	Qiáonán Jiēdào	kiu4 nam4 gai1 dou6
Shatou Subdistrict	沙头街道	Shātóu Jiēdào	sa1 teo4 gai1 dou6
Xiaoguwei Subdistrict	小谷围街道	Xiǎogǔwéi Jiēdào	xiu2 gug1 wei4 gai1 dou6
Nancun Town	南村镇	Náncūn Zhèn	nam4 qun1 zan3
Xinzao Town	新造镇	Xīnzào Zhèn	sen1 lung4 zou6 zan3
Hualong Town	化龙镇	Huàlóng Zhèn	fa3 lung4 zan3
Shilou Town	石楼镇	Shílóu Zhèn	ség6 leo4 zan3
Shiqi Town	石碁镇	Shíqí Zhèn	ség6 kéi4 zen3
Shawan Town	沙湾镇	Shāwān Zhèn	saa1 waan1 zan3

=== Huadu ===
Name	Chinese (S)	Hanyu Pinyin	Canton Romanization
Xinhua Subdistrict	新华街道	Xīnhuá Jiēdào	sen1 wa4 gai1 dou6
Xinya Subdistrict	新雅街道	Xīnyǎ Jiēdào	sen1 nga5 gai1 dou6
Huacheng Subdistrict	花城街道	Huāchéng Jiēdào	fa1 xing4 gai1 dou6
Xiuquan Subdistrict	秀全街道	Xiùquán Jiēdào	seo3 qun4 gai1 dou6
Timian Town	梯面镇	Tīmiàn Zhèn	tei1 min6 zen3
Huashan Town	花山镇	Huāshān Zhèn	fa1 san1 zen3
Tanbu Town	炭步镇	Tànbù Zhèn	tan3 bou6 zen3
Chini Town	赤坭镇	Chìní Zhèn	cég3 nei4 zen3
Shiling Town	狮岭镇	Shīlǐng Zhèn	xi1 léng5 zen3
Huadong Town	花东镇	Huādōng Zhèn	fa1 dung1 zen3

=== Nansha ===
Name	Chinese (S)	Hanyu Pinyin	Canton Romanization
Nansha Subdistrict	南沙街道	Nánshā Jiēdào	nam4 sa1 gai1 dou6
Zhujiang Subdistrict	珠江街道	Zhūjiāng Jiēdào	ju1 gong1 gai1 dou6
Longxue Subdistrict	龙穴街道	Lóngxué Jiēdào	lung4 yud6 gai1 dou6
Huangge Town	黄阁镇	Huánggé Zhèn	wong4 gog3 zen3
Wanqingsha Town	万顷沙镇	Wànqǐngshā Zhèn	man6 king2 sa1 zen3
Hengli Town	横沥镇	Hénglì Zhèn	wang4 lig6 zen3
Dongchong Town	东涌镇	Dōngchōng Zhèn	dung1 chung1 zen3
Dagang Town	大岗镇	Dàgǎng Zhèn	dai6 gong1 zen3
Lanhe Town	榄核镇	Lǎnhé Zhèn	lam5 hed6 zen3

=== Zengcheng ===
Name	Chinese (S)	Hanyu Pinyin	Canton Romanization
Licheng Subdistrict	荔城街道	Lìchéng Jiēdào	lei6 séng4 gai1 dou6
Zengjiang Subdistrict	增江街道	Zēngjiāng Jiēdào	zeng1 gong1 gai1 dou6
Zhucun Subdistrict	朱村街道	Zhūcūn Jiēdào	ju1 qun1 gai1 dou6
Yongning Subdistrict	永宁街道	Yǒngníng Jiēdào	wing5 ning4 gai1 dou6
Zhengguo Town	正果镇	Zhèngguǒ Zhèn	zéng3 guo2 zen3
Shitan Town	石滩镇	Shítān Zhèn	ség6 tan1 zen3
Xintang Town	新塘镇	Xīntáng Zhèn	sen1 tong4 zen3
Zhongxin Town	中新镇	Zhōngxīn Zhèn	zung1 sen1 zen3
Paitan Town	派潭镇	Pàitán Zhèn	pai3 tam4 zen3
Xiaolou Town	小楼镇	Xiǎolóu Zhèn	xiu2 leo4 zen3
Xiancun Town	仙村镇	Xiāncūn Zhèn	xin1 qun1 zen3

=== Conghua ===
Name	Chinese (S)	Hanyu Pinyin	Canton Romanization
Jiekou Subdistrict	街口街道	Jiēkǒu Jiēdào	gai1 heo2 gai1 dou6
Chengjiao Subdistrict	城郊街道	Chéngjiāo Jiēdào	séng4 gao1 gai1 dou6
Jiangbu Subdistrict	江埔街道	Jiāngbù Jiēdào	gong1 bou3 gai1 dou6
Wenquan Town	温泉镇	Wēnquán Zhèn	wen1 qun4 zen3
Liangkou Town	良口镇	Liángkǒu Zhèn	lêng4 heo2 zen3
Lütian Town	吕田镇	Lǚtián Zhèn	lêu5 tin4 zen3
Taiping Town	太平镇	Tàipíng Zhèn	tai3 ping4 zen3
Aotou Town	鳌头镇	Áotóu Zhèn	ngou4 teo4 zen3

== Historical divisions ==
=== ROC (1911–1949) ===
County / City	Present division
Guangzhou City 廣州市; 5 120 244 inhab. and 282,93 km^{2}	Yuexiu, Liwan, Haizhu, Tianhe
Nanhai County, Guangdong 南海縣	part of Liwan, part of Baiyun
Panyu County, Guangdong 番禺縣	Panyu, Baiyun, Huangpu, Nansha, part of Tianhe
Hua County, Guangdong 花縣	Huadu
Conghua County, Guangdong 從化縣	Conghua
Zengcheng County, Guangdong 增城縣	Zengcheng

=== 1949-1960 ===
1949 - 1950 (28 districts)	1950 - 1951 (16 districts)	1951 - 1952 (15 districts)	1952 - 1953 (12 districts)	1953 - 1954 (12 districts)	1954 - 1958 (10 districts)	1958 - 1959 (5 dist. 2 co.)	1959 - 1960 (10 districts)
Fengyuan 逢源区	Liwan 荔湾区		XI 西区	Xi 西区			
Xichan 西禅区	Liwan 荔湾区		XI 西区	Xi 西区			
Chentang 陈塘区	Liwan 荔湾区		XI 西区	Xi 西区			
Changshou 长寿区	长寿区		XI 西区	Xi 西区			
Shamian 沙面区	长寿区		XI 西区	Xi 西区			
Huangsha 黄沙区	长寿区		XI 西区	Xi 西区			
Taiping 太平区		Taiping 太平区	XI 西区	Xi 西区			
Taiping 太平区		Xicun 西村区		Xi 西区			
Jinghai 靖海区	Yuexiu 越秀区		Bei 北区		Bei 北区		
Xiaobei 小北区	Yuexiu 越秀区		Bei 北区		Bei 北区		
Dexuan 德宣区	Yuexiu 越秀区		Bei 北区		Bei 北区		
Xishan 西山区	Yuexiu 越秀区		Bei 北区		Bei 北区		
Huifu 惠福区			Bei 北区		Bei 北区		
Dongdi 东堤区	Yonghan 永汉区		Zhong 中区		Bei 北区		
Hanmin 汉民区	Yonghan 永汉区		Zhong 中区		Bei 北区		
Qianjian 前鉴区	Yonghan 永汉区		Zhong 中区		Bei 北区		
Dadong 大东区	Dadong 大东区		Dong 东区				
Dongshan 东山区	Dadong 大东区		Dong 东区				
Hongde 洪德区	Henan 河南区						
Mengsheng 蒙圣区	Henan 河南区						
Haichuang 海幢区	Henan 河南区						
Xinzhou 新洲区		Xinjiao 新滘区				Jiao 郊区	Xinjiao 新滘区
Lijiao 沥滘区		Xinjiao 新滘区				Jiao 郊区	Xinjiao 新滘区
Sanyuanli 三元里区		Baiyun 白云区				Jiao 郊区	Baiyun 白云区
Shipai 石牌区						Jiao 郊区	Baiyun 白云区
Shahe 沙河区						Jiao 郊区	Shahe 沙河区
Nan'an 南岸区						Jiao 郊区	Nan'an 南岸区
Fangcun 芳村区						Jiao 郊区	Fangcun 芳村区
Foshan (city) 佛山市				Huangpu 黄埔区		Jiao 郊区	Huangpu 黄埔区
Foshan (city) 佛山市						Guangbei County 广北县	Foshan (city) 佛山市
Foshan (city) 佛山市						Hua County 花县	Foshan (city) 佛山市
Zhujiang 珠江区							

=== 1960-2000 ===
1960 - 1961 (7 dist. 2 co.)	1961 - 1962 (7 dist. 3 co.)	1962 - 1963 (5 dist. 3 co.)	1963 - 1973 (5 dist. 2 co.)	1973 - 1975 (6 dist. 2 co.)	1975 - 1983 (6 dist. 6 co.)	1983 - 1985 (6 dist. 8 co.)	1985 - 1987 (8 dist. 8 co.)	1987 - 1988 (8 dist. 8 co.)	1988 - 1992 (8 dist. 4 co.)	1992 - 1993 (8 d. 1 ci. 3 co.)	1993 - 1994 (8 d. 3 ci. 1 co.)	1994 - 2000 (8 d. 4 ci.)
Yuexiu 越秀区
Dongshan 东山区
Haizhu 海珠区
Liwan 荔湾区
Fangcun 芳村区		Jiao 郊区		Jiao 郊区			Fangcun 芳村区					
Jiangcun 江村区		Jiao 郊区		Jiao 郊区			Tianhe 天河区					
Jiangcun 江村区		Jiao 郊区		Jiao 郊区			Jiao 郊区	Baiyun 白云区				
Huangpu 黄埔区		Jiao 郊区		Huangpu 黄埔区								
Foshan (city) 佛山市	Hua County 花县										Huadu (city) 花都市	
Foshan (city) 佛山市	Conghua County 从化县											Conghua (city) 从化市
Foshan (city) 佛山市					Panyu County 番禺县					Panyu (city) 番禺市		
Huiyang (city) 惠阳市					Zengcheng County 增城县						Zengcheng (city) 增城市	
Huiyang (city) 惠阳市					Longmen County 龙门县				Huizhou (city) 惠州市			
Shaoguan Prefecture 韶关地区	Fogang County 佛冈县		Shaoguan Prefecture 韶关地区		Shaoguan Prefecture 韶关地区	Fogang County 佛冈县			Qingyuan (city) 清远市			
Shaoguan Prefecture 韶关地区	Shaoguan Prefecture 韶关地区		Shaoguan Prefecture 韶关地区		Shaoguan Prefecture 韶关地区	Qingyuan County 清远县			Qingyuan (city) 清远市			
Shaoguan Prefecture 韶关地区	Shaoguan Prefecture 韶关地区		Shaoguan Prefecture 韶关地区		Xingfeng County 新丰县				Shaoguan (city) 韶关市			

=== Since 2000 ===
2000 - 2005 (10 dist. 2 ci.)		2005 - 2014 (10 dist. 2 ci.)	2014–present (11 districts)
Yuexiu 越秀区		Yuexiu 越秀区	
Dongshan 东山区		Yuexiu 越秀区	
Liwan 荔湾区		Liwan 荔湾区	
Fangcun 芳村区		Liwan 荔湾区	
Haizhu 海珠区
Tianhe 天河区	↓	Tianhe 天河区	
Baiyun 白云区	↓	Baiyun 白云区	
Huangpu 黄埔区	↓	Huangpu 黄埔区	Huangpu 黄埔区
	↳	Luogang 萝岗区	Huangpu 黄埔区
Panyu (city) 番禺市	Panyu 番禺区	Panyu 番禺区	
Panyu (city) 番禺市	Panyu 番禺区	Nansha 南沙区	
Huadu (city) 花都市	Huadu 花都区		
Zengcheng (city) 增城市			Zengcheng 增城区
Conghua (city) 从化市			Conghua 从化区
