= Hongqiao =

Hongqiao may refer to the following locations in China:

== Literal meaning ==
- Covered bridge (廊桥 or 虹桥 in Chinese), a kind of bridge which looks like a rainbow

== Transport ==
- Shanghai Hongqiao International Airport (上海虹桥国际机场), secondary airport of Shanghai, named after Hongqiao, Minhang District, Shanghai
- Shanghai Hongqiao railway station (上海虹桥站), one of major railway stations in Shanghai, named after Hongqiao Airport.
- Hongqiao Road station (虹桥路站), interchange station on the Shanghai Metro

== Companies ==
- Hongqiao Market, a shopping center in Beijing
- China Hongqiao Group, a Chinese aluminum manufacturer.

== Districts ==
- Hongqiao District (红桥区), Tianjin

== Subdistricts ==
- Hongqiao Subdistrict, Aksu (红桥街道), Xinjiang

Written as "洪桥街道"

- Hongqiao Subdistrict, Guangzhou (洪桥街道), in Yuexiu District
- Hongqiao Subdistrict, Qidong (洪桥街道), in Qidong County

Written as "虹桥街道"

- Hongqiao Subdistrict, Nantong, in Chongchuan District, Nantong, Jiangsu
- Hongqiao, Changning, (Changning District), named after Hongqiao Road in Shanghai.
- Hongqiao, Minhang, (Minhang District), in Shanghai.
- Hongqiao Subdistrict, Wusu, Xinjiang
- Hongqiao Subdistrict, Xuanwei, Yunnan

== Towns ==
- Hongqiao, Jiang'an County (红桥镇), Sichuan
- Hongqiao, Changxing County (洪桥镇), Zhejiang

Written as "虹桥镇"

- Hongqiao, Hebei, in Yutian County
- Hongqiao, Pingjiang, in Pingjiang County, Hunan province.
- Hongqiao, Taixing, Jiangsu
- Hongqiao, Minhang District, Shanghai
- Hongqiao, Yueqing, Zhejiang

== Townships ==
- Hongqiao Township, Yunnan (红桥乡), in Ninglang Yi Autonomous County

Written as "虹桥乡"

- Hongqiao Township, Jiangxi, in Yanshan County
- Hongqiao Township, Sichuan, in Wanyuan
