= Hongqiao Subdistrict =

Hongqiao Subdistrict may refer to the following locations in China:

- Hongqiao Subdistrict, Aksu (红桥街道), Xinjiang

Written as "洪桥街道"

- Hongqiao Subdistrict, Guangzhou (洪桥街道), in Yuexiu District
- Hongqiao Subdistrict, Qidong (洪桥街道), in Qidong County, Hunan

Written as "虹桥街道"

- Hongqiao Subdistrict, Shanghai, in Changning District, named after Hongqiao Road in Shanghai.
- Hongqiao Subdistrict, Wusu, Xinjiang
- Hongqiao Subdistrict, Xuanwei, Yunnan
