= Dadong (disambiguation) =

Dadong may refer to:

== China ==
District

- Dadong District (大东区), Shenyang, Liaoning

Subdistricts (大东街道)

- Dadong Subdistrict, Guangzhou, in Yuexiu District, Guangzhou, Guangdong
- Dadong Subdistrict, Jilin City, in Chuanying District, Jilin City, Jilin
- Dadong Subdistrict, Donggang, Liaoning

Towns

Written as "大东镇":

- Dadong, Dabu County, Guangdong
- Dadong, Jiangsu, in Lianshui County

Written as "大垌镇":

- Dadong, Bobai County, Guangxi
- Dadong, Qinzhou, in Qinbei District, Qinzhou, Guangxi

Townships

- Dadong Township (大东乡), in Gucheng District, Lijiang, Yunnan

Other

- Da Dong Roast Duck Restaurant (often rendered as "DaDong"), main restaurant located in Dongcheng District, Beijing

== South Korea ==
- Da-dong (다동 / 茶洞), neighbourhood of the Jung-gu District in Seoul

== Taiwan ==
- Dadong metro station
