= Hongqiao Township =

Hongqiao Township may refer to the following locations in China:

- Hongqiao Township, Yunnan (红桥乡), in Ninglang Yi Autonomous County
- Hongqiao Township, Sichuan, in Wanyuan
