= Shanghai Hongqiao =

Shanghai Hongqiao may refer to:

== Transport ==
- Shanghai Hongqiao International Airport (上海虹桥国际机场, IATA: SHA), one of two international airports serving Shanghai, China.
- Shanghai Hongqiao railway station (上海虹桥站), a high-speed railway station.
- Hongqiao transportation hub (虹桥综合交通枢纽), an intermodal transportation hub encompassing the Shanghai Hongqiao International Airport and Shanghai Hongqiao railway station.
- Hongqiao Railway Station metro station (虹桥火车站), a Shanghai Metro station located within the Shanghai Hongqiao railway station complex.
- Hongqiao Airport Terminal 1 station (虹桥1号航站楼), a station on Line 10 of the Shanghai Metro, located near Terminal 1 of Shanghai Hongqiao International Airport.
- Hongqiao Airport Terminal 2 station (虹桥2号航站楼), an interchange station between Line 2 and Line 10 of the Shanghai Metro, located near both Terminal 2 of Shanghai Hongqiao International Airport and the Shanghai Hongqiao Railway Station.
- Hongqiao Road station (虹桥路), an interchange station between Lines 3, 4 and 10 on the Shanghai Metro.

== Subdistricts ==
- Hongqiao Subdistrict, Shanghai, in Changning District, named after Hongqiao Road in Shanghai.

== Towns ==
- Hongqiao, Minhang District, Shanghai
