= Zhuguang =

Zhuguang may refer to:

- Zhuguang Subdistrict, Guangzhou, a subdistrict of Yuexiu District in Guangzhou
- Zhuguang station, a Shenzhen Metro station
- Zhuguang Road station, a Shanghai Metro station
