= Jiang'an =

Jiang'an may refer to the following locations in China:

- Jiang'an County (江安县; 江安縣), Yibin, Sichuan
- Jiang'an District (江岸区; 江岸區), Wuhan, Hubei
