= Hongqiao, Jiang'an County =

Hongqiao 红桥镇
- Town
- Location in Sichuan
- Coordinates: 28°25′44″N 105°02′39″E
- Country: People's Republic of China
- Province: Sichuan
- Prefecture-level city: Yibin
- County: Jiang'an
- Elevation: 330 m (1,080 ft)
- Time zone: UTC+8 (China Standard)

Hongqiao (simplified Chinese: 红桥; traditional Chinese: 紅橋; pinyin: Hóngqiáo; lit. 'red bridge') is a town in Jiang'an County in southeastern Sichuan province, China, located 53 kilometres (33 mi) southeast of downtown Yibin. As of 2011, it has 2 residential communities (社区), and 15 villages under its administration.
