= Baihe Subdistrict =

Subdistrict of Hunan, China

Coordinates: 26°46′47″N 112°10′33″E

Baihe Subdistrict (Chinese: 白鹤街道; pinyin: Báihè Jiēdào) is a subdistrict of Qidong County in Hunan, China. It was one of four subdistricts approved to establish in 2014. The subdistrict has an area of 76.13 km^{2} (29.39 sq mi) with a population of 40,700 (as of 2014). Through the amalgamation of village-level divisions in 2016, the subdistrict of Baihe has 7 villages and 11 communities under its jurisdiction. Its seat is at Baiyang Road (Chinese: 白杨路).

== Subdivisions ==
The subdistrict of Baihe had 23 villages and 11 communities at its establishment in 2014. Its divisions were reduced to 18 from 44 through the amalgamation of villages in 2016. It has 7 villages and 11 communities under its jurisdiction.

7 villages

- Hehua Xincun Village (Chinese: 荷花新村)
- Jinxing Village (Chinese: 金星村)
- Luoyun Village (Chinese: 罗云村)
- Mingluqiao Village (Chinese: 鸣鹿桥村)
- Paishan Village (Chinese: 排山村)
- Taihe Village (Chinese: 太和村)
- Yanshan Village (Chinese: 燕山村)

11 communities

- Baihe Community (Chinese: 白鹤社区)
- Baijia Community (Chinese: 百家社区)
- Fanfeng Community (Chinese: 帆丰社区)
- Fengxing Community (Chinese: 凤形社区)
- Huanglong Community (Chinese: 黄龙社区)
- Qianfeng Community (Chinese: 前丰社区)
- Tangjia Community (Chinese: 唐家社区)
- Taohong Community (Chinese: 桃红社区)
- Xiufeng Community (Chinese: 秀丰社区)
- Zhuanchong Community (Chinese: 砖冲社区)
- Zuwan Community (Chinese: 祖湾社区)
