= Yuhe Subdistrict =

Subdistrict of Hunan, China

Coordinates: 26°47′43″N 112°05′07″E

Yuhe Subdistrict (Chinese: 玉合街道; pinyin: Yùhé Jiēdào) is a subdistrict and the seat of Qidong County in Hunan, China. It was one of four subdistricts approved to establish in 2014. The subdistrict has an area of 60.09 km^{2} (23.20 sq mi) with a population of 69,800 (as of 2014). The subdistrict of Yuhe has 7 villages and 7 communities under its jurisdiction. Its seat is at Yongchang Avenue (Chinese: 永昌大道).

== History ==
The subdistrict of Yuhe was approved to establish from 17 villages and 7 communities of the former Hongqiao Town (Chinese: 洪桥镇) in September 2014. It was officially created in November 2014 and named after the Yuhe mountain (Chinese: 玉合山).

== Subdivisions ==
The subdistrict of Yuhe had 17 villages and 7 communities at its establishment in 2014. Its villages were reduced to 7 from 17 through the amalgamation of villages in 2016. It has 7 villages and 7 communities under its jurisdiction.

7 villages

- Dafu Village (Chinese: 大福村): organized through merging 2 villages of Dazhu (大竹) and Fuguang (福广) in 2016
- Hejia Village (Chinese: 何家村): organized through merging 2 villages of Hejia (何家) and Pangu (盘古) in 2016
- Jiulong Village (Chinese: 玖隆村): organized through merging 3 villages of Zhangjia (张家), Li'etang (黎阿塘) and Qiaoting (乔亭) in 2016
- Luye Village (Chinese: 绿野村): organized through merging 4 villages of Luye (绿野), Xinzhou (新洲), Fengxing (凤形) and Baihua (百花) in 2016
- Qiaofeng Village (Chinese: 乔丰村): organized through merging 2 villages of Qiaomu (乔木) and Shifeng (石峰) in 2016
- Qingshan Village (Chinese: 青山村): organized through merging 2 villages of Qingshan (青山) and Shuiping (水平) in 2016
- Shanqiao Village (Chinese: 山硚村): organized through merging 2 villages of Nuanshan (峦山) and Qiaodong (桥洞) in 2016

7 communities

- Caoxi Community (Chinese: 曹西社区)
- Hongfeng Community (Chinese: 洪丰社区)
- Qifeng Community (Chinese: 祁丰社区)
- Sansheng Community (Chinese: 三圣社区)
- Shimen Community (Chinese: 石门社区)
- Xinfeng Community (Chinese: 新丰社区)
- Yanjia Community (Chinese: 颜家社区)
