= Guangdong Provincial Department of Education =

Government organization in Guangzhou, China

- Simplified Chinese: 广东省教育厅
- Traditional Chinese: 廣東省教育廳
Transcriptions
Standard Mandarin
- Hanyu Pinyin: Guǎngdōngshěng Jiàoyù Tīng
Yue: Cantonese
- Jyutping: gwong2 dung1 saang2 gaau3 juk6 teng1

Guangdong Province Department of Education is a department of the provincial government of Guangdong, China. Its headquarters is in Yuexiu District, Guangzhou.
