= Yongchang Subdistrict =

Subdistrict of Qidong County, Hunan, China

Coordinates: 26°46′53.0″N 112°4′49.8″E

Yongchang Subdistrict (Chinese: 永昌街道; pinyin: Yǒngchāng Jiēdào) is a subdistrict of Qidong County in Hunan, China. It was one of four subdistricts approved to establish in 2014. The subdistrict has an area of 52.38 km^{2} (20.22 sq mi) with a population of 71,900 (as of 2014). Through the amalgamation of village-level divisions in 2016, the subdistrict of Yongchang has 9 villages and 10 communities under its jurisdiction. Its seat is at Shuguang Road (Chinese: 曙光路).

== Subdivisions ==
The subdistrict of Yongchang had 20 villages and 10 communities at its establishment in 2014. Its divisions were reduced to 19 from 30 through the amalgamation of villages in 2016, it has 9 villages and 10 communities under its jurisdiction.

9 villages

- Fahua Village (Chinese: 法华村)
- Goulan Village (Chinese: 勾兰村)
- Hongqiaoding Village (Chinese: 洪塘町村)
- Hutang Village (Chinese: 湖塘村)
- Meitangding Village (Chinese: 梅塘町村)
- Shangshu Village (Chinese: 尚书村)
- Shuangxing Village (Chinese: 双星村)
- Tongle Village (Chinese: 同乐村)
- Zhaopingpu Village (Chinese: 赵坪铺村)

10 communities

- Huangtupu Community (Chinese: 黄土铺社区)
- Lanzhitang Community (Chinese: 兰芝塘社区)
- Liaojia Community (Chinese: 廖家社区)
- Qiantang Community (Chinese: 浅塘社区)
- Shuguang Community (Chinese: 曙光社区)
- Taiyangsheng Community (Chinese: 太阳升社区)
- Wenquan Community (Chinese: 温泉社区)
- Yanziyan Community (Chinese: 燕子岩社区)
- Zhapo Community (Chinese: 柞陂社区)
- Zhujia Community (Chinese: 朱家社区)
