= Datang Subdistrict, Guangzhou =

Subdistrict of Guangzhou, China

Coordinates: 23.125238°N 113.273042°E

- Simplified Chinese: 大塘街道
Transcriptions
Standard Mandarin
- Hanyu Pinyin: Dàtáng Jiēdào
Yue: Cantonese
- Canton Romanization: dai6 tong4 gai1 dou6

Datang is a subdistrict of the Yuexiu District in Guangzhou City, Guangdong Province, southern China.
