= Dongshan Subdistrict, Guangzhou =

Subdistrict of Guangzhou, China

Coordinates: 23.122366°N 113.299276°E

- Simplified Chinese: 东山街道
Transcriptions
Standard Mandarin
- Hanyu Pinyin: Dōngshān Jiēdào
Yue: Cantonese
- Canton Romanization: dung1 san1 gai1 dou6

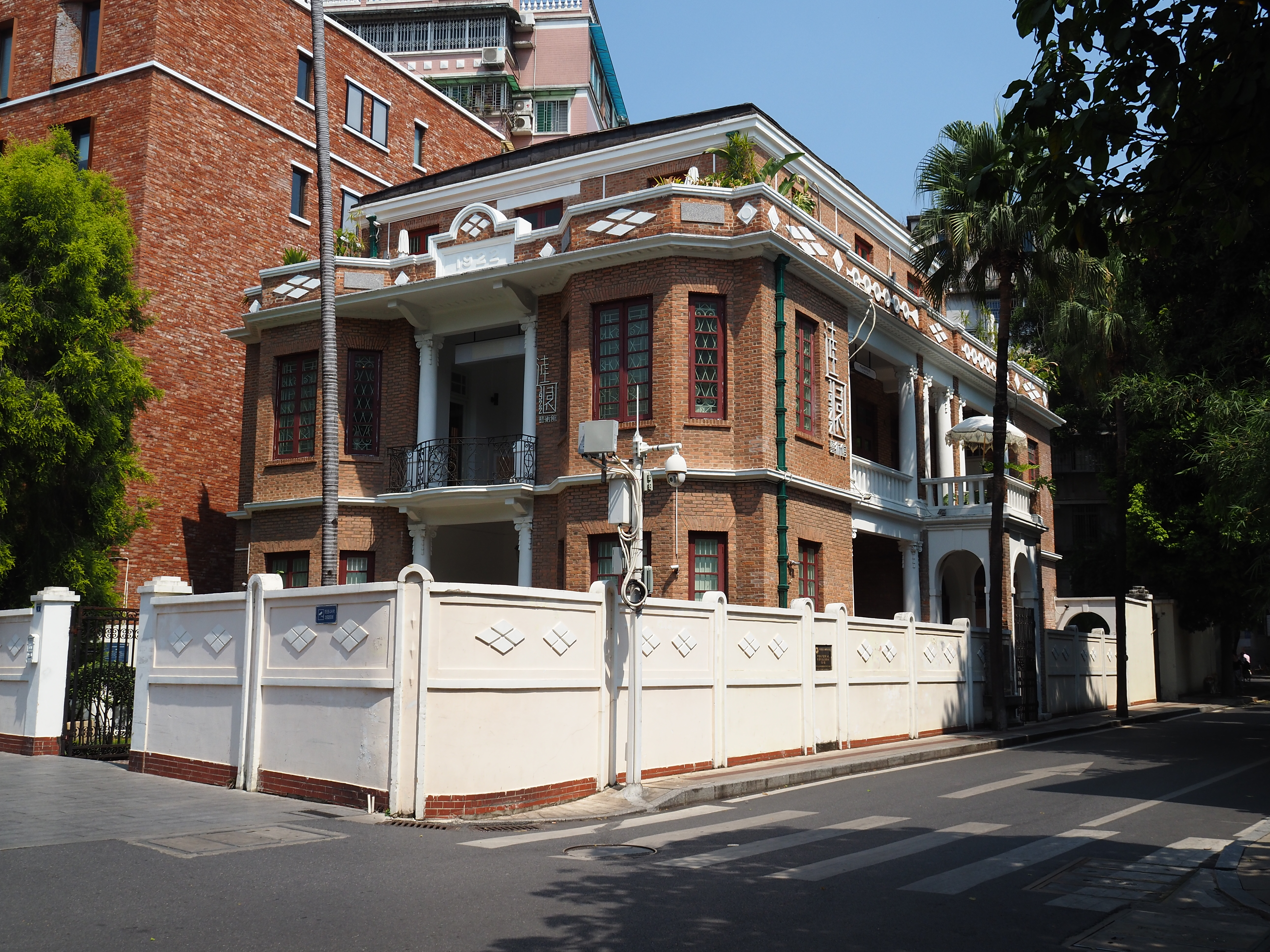

Dongshan is a subdistrict of the Yuexiu District in Guangzhou City, Guangdong Province, southern China.
