= Liuhua Subdistrict, Guangzhou =

Subdistrict of Guangzhou, China

Coordinates: 23.14805°N 113.26311°E

- Simplified Chinese: 流花街道
Transcriptions
Standard Mandarin
- Hanyu Pinyin: Liúhuā Jiēdào
Yue: Cantonese
- Canton Romanization: leo4 fa1 gai1 dou6

Liuhua is a subdistrict of the Yuexiu District in Guangzhou City, Guangdong Province, southern China.
