= Jianshe Subdistrict, Guangzhou =

Subdistrict of Guangzhou, China

Coordinates: 23.13544°N 113.28431°E

- Simplified Chinese: 建设街道
Transcriptions
Standard Mandarin
- Hanyu Pinyin: Jiànshè Jiēdào
Yue: Cantonese
- Canton Romanization: gin3 qid3 gai1 dou6

Jianshe is a subdistrict of the Yuexiu District in Guangzhou City, Guangdong Province, southern China.
