= Guangta Subdistrict, Guangzhou =

Subdistrict of Guangzhou, China

Coordinates: 23.123111°N 113.259293°E

- Simplified Chinese: 光塔街道
Transcriptions
Standard Mandarin
- Hanyu Pinyin: Guāngtǎ Jiēdào
Yue: Cantonese
- Canton Romanization: guong1 tab3 gai1 dou6

Guangta is a subdistrict of the Yuexiu District in Guangzhou City, Guangdong Province, southern China.
