= Guangwei Subdistrict, Guangzhou =

Subdistrict of Guangzhou, China

Coordinates: 23.130°N 113.263°E

- Simplified Chinese: 广卫街道
Transcriptions
Standard Mandarin
- Hanyu Pinyin: Guǎngwèi Jiēdào
Yue: Cantonese
- Canton Romanization: guong2 wei6 gai1 dou6

Guangwei is a subdistrict of the Yuexiu District in Guangzhou City, Guangdong Province, southern China.
