= Huale Subdistrict, Guangzhou =

Subdistrict in Yuexiu, Guangzhou, China

Coordinates: 23.136895°N 113.285938°E

- Simplified Chinese: 华乐街道
Transcriptions
Standard Mandarin
- Hanyu Pinyin: Huálè Jiēdào
Yue: Cantonese
- Canton Romanization: wa4 log6 gai1 dou6

Huale is a subdistrict of the Yuexiu District in Guangzhou City, Guangdong Province, southern China.
