= Huanghuagang Subdistrict, Guangzhou =

Subdistrict of Guangzhou, China

Coordinates: 23.137701°N 113.296527°E

- Simplified Chinese: 黄花岗街道
Transcriptions
Standard Mandarin
- Hanyu Pinyin: Huánghuāgāng Jiēdào
Yue: Cantonese
- Canton Romanization: wong4 fa1 gong1 gai1 dou6

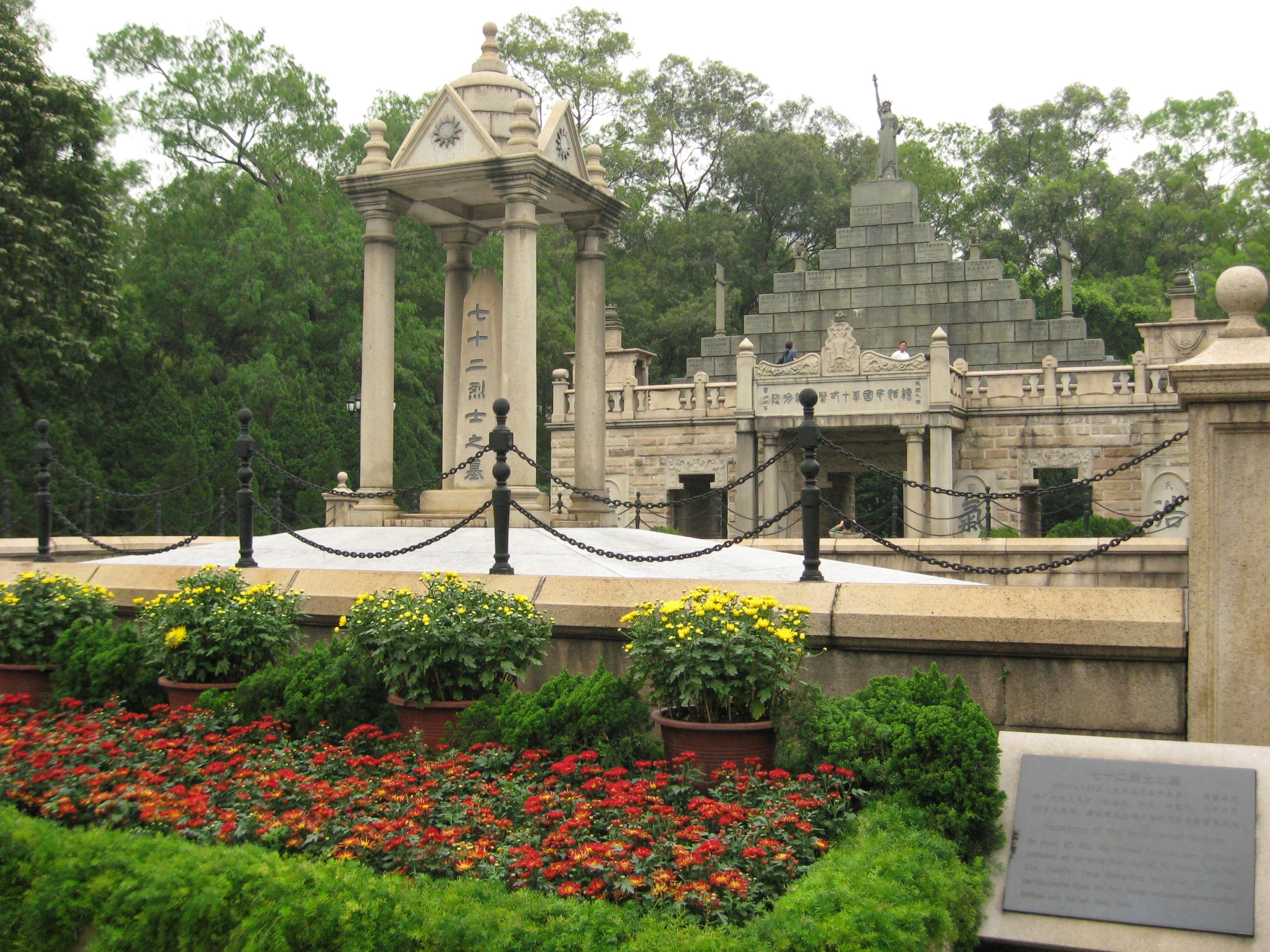
The Yellow Flower Mound Mausoleum of the 72 Martyrs identified after the 1911 Second Guangzhou Uprising against the Qing.

Huanghuagang is a subdistrict of the Yuexiu District in Guangzhou City, Guangdong Province, southern China.

== See also ==
- Second Guangzhou Uprising
