= Dengfeng Subdistrict, Guangzhou =

Subdistrict of Guangzhou, China

Coordinates: 23.14413°N 113.27999°E

- Simplified Chinese: 登峰街道
Transcriptions
Standard Mandarin
- Hanyu Pinyin: Dēngfēng Jiēdào
Yue: Cantonese
- Canton Romanization: deng1 fung1 gai1 dou6

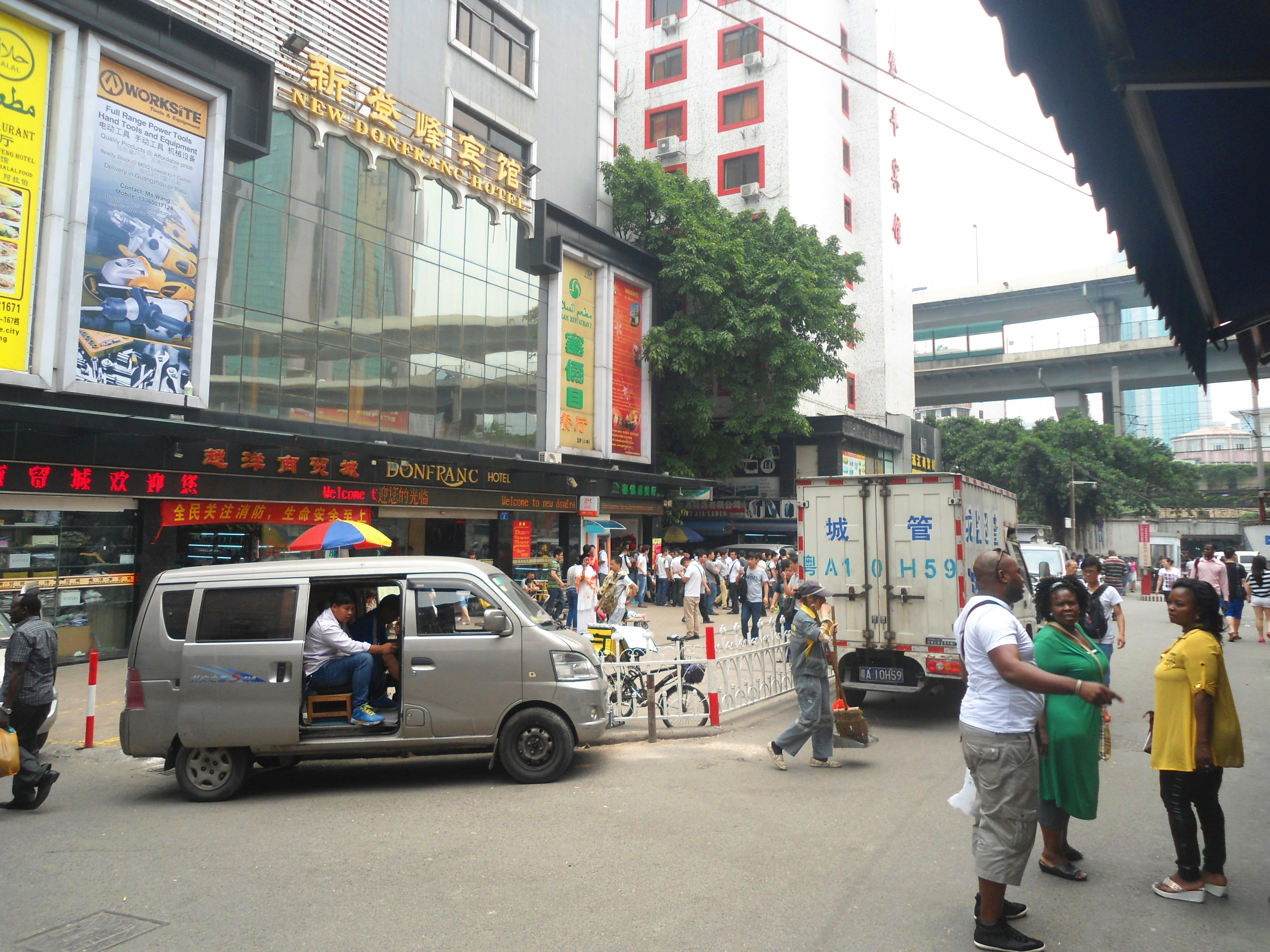
The southern end of Baohan Straight Street, the heart of the African area

Dengfeng is a subdistrict of the Yuexiu District in Guangzhou City, Guangdong Province, southern China.
