= Renmin Subdistrict, Guangzhou =

Renmin Subdistrict 人民街道
- Subdistrict
- Location in Guangdong
- Coordinates: 23.11471°N 113.26188°E
- Country: China
- Province: Guangdong
- Prefecture-level city: Guangzhou
- District: Yuexiu District
- Time zone: UTC+8 (China Standard Time)

Renmin Subdistrict (Chinese: 人民街道; pinyin: Rénmín Jiēdào; Jyutping: Jan^{4}-man^{4} gaai^{1}-dou^{6}) is a subdistrict of the Yuexiu District in Guangzhou City, Guangdong Province, southern China. As of 2020, it administers the following 15 residential neighborhoods:

- Anyeli Community (安业里社区)
- Xingxianli Community (兴贤里社区)
- Haizhushi Community (海珠石社区)
- Guocaixi Community (果菜西社区)
- Qinglanli Community (青兰里社区)
- Jinghaimen Community (靖海门社区)
- Taipingtongjin Community (太平通津社区)
- Mupaitou Community (木排头社区)
- Shijiangjun Community (石将军社区)
- Dadezhong Community (大德中社区)
- Daxinzhong Community (大新中社区)
- Yudaihao Community (玉带濠社区)
- Sanfuqian Community (三府前社区)
- Zhuangyuanfang Community (状元坊社区)
- Yidexi Community (一德西社区)

Shijiangjun, Dadezhong, Daxinzhong, Yudaihao, Sanfuqian, Zhuangyuanfang and Yidexi were administered by Daxin Subdistrict (大新街道) before it was abolished in 2013.
