= Beijing Subdistrict, Guangzhou =

Beijing Subdistrict 北京街道
- Subdistrict
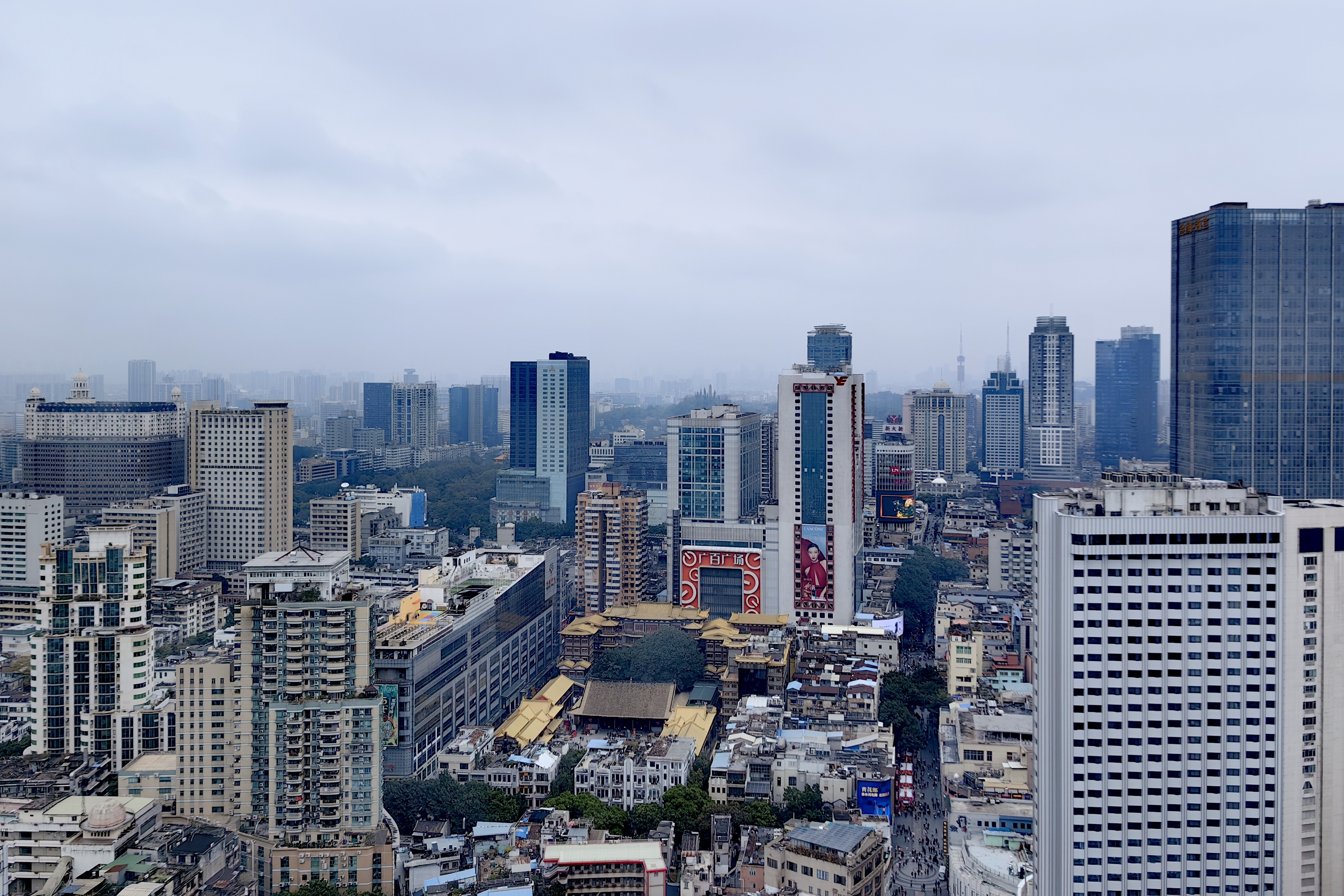

- Location in Guangdong
- Coordinates: 23.121858°N 113.267624°E
- Country: People's Republic of China
- Province: Guangdong
- Prefecture-level city: Guangzhou
- District: Yuexiu District
- Time zone: UTC+8 (China Standard)

Beijing Subdistrict (Chinese: 北京街道; pinyin: Běijīng Jiēdào; Jyutping: bak^{1} ging^{1} gaai^{1} dou^{6}) is a subdistrict of Yuexiu District, Guangzhou, Guangdong province, China. As of 2018, it has 13 residential communities under its administration.
