= Liurong Subdistrict, Guangzhou =

Subdistrict of Guangzhou, China

Coordinates: 23.129187°N 113.259816°E

- Simplified Chinese: 六榕街道
Transcriptions
Standard Mandarin
- Hanyu Pinyin: Liùróng Jiēdào
Yue: Cantonese
- Canton Romanization: lug6 yung4 gai1 dou6

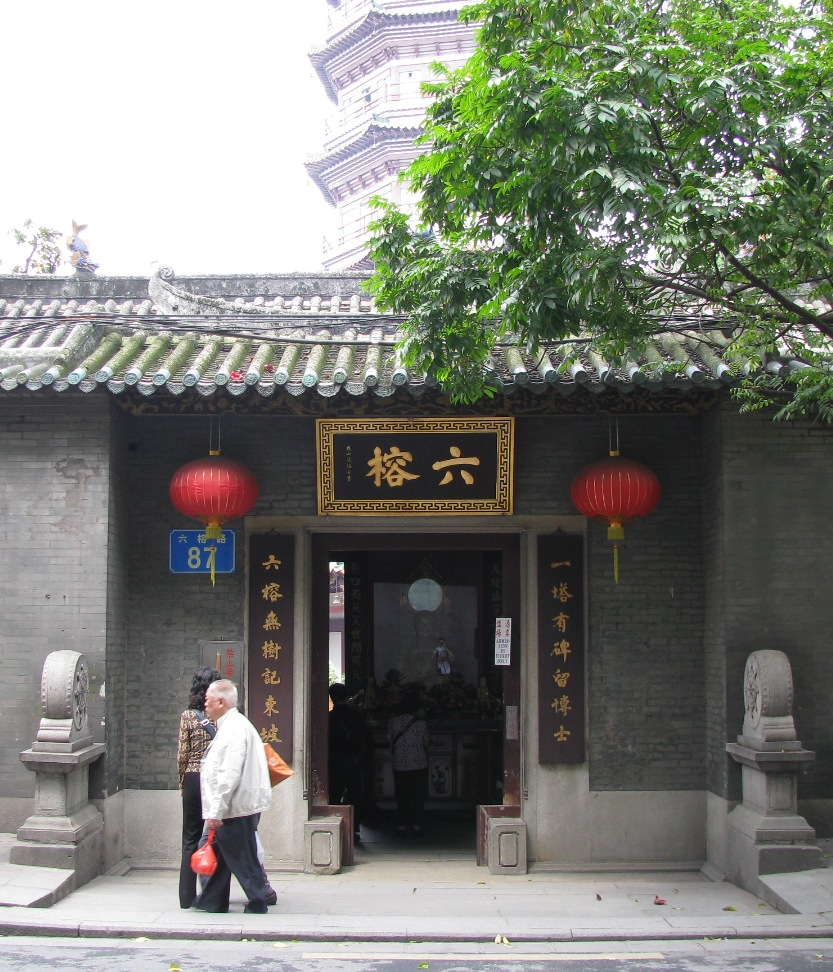

Liurong is a subdistrict of the Yuexiu District in Guangzhou City, Guangdong Province, southern China.
