= Kuangquan Subdistrict, Guangzhou =

Subdistrict of Guangzhou, China

Coordinates: 23.15837°N 113.25501°E

- Simplified Chinese: 矿泉街道
- Traditional Chinese: 礦泉街道
Transcriptions
Standard Mandarin
- Hanyu Pinyin: Kuàngquán Jiēdào
Yue: Cantonese
- Jyutping: kwong^{3} cyun^{4} gaai^{1} dou^{6}
- Canton Romanization: kong3 qun4 gai1 dou6

Kuangquan is a subdistrict of the Yuexiu District in Guangzhou City, Guangdong Province, southern China.
