= Baiyun Subdistrict, Guangzhou =

Subdistrict of Guangzhou, China

Coordinates: 23.118725°N 113.284235°E

- Simplified Chinese: 白云街道
- Traditional Chinese: 白雲街道
Transcriptions
Standard Mandarin
- Hanyu Pinyin: Báiyún Jiēdào
Yue: Cantonese
- Canton Romanization: bag6 wen4 gai1 dou6

Baiyun is a subdistrict of the Yuexiu District in Guangzhou City, Guangdong Province, southern China.
