= Dongfeng Subdistrict, Guangzhou =

Subdistrict of Guangzhou, China

Coordinates: 23.13206°N 113.25386°E

- Simplified Chinese: 东风街道
Transcriptions
Standard Mandarin
- Hanyu Pinyin: Hōngfēng Jiēdào
Yue: Cantonese
- Canton Romanization: dung1 fung1 gai1 dou6

Dongfeng is a subdistrict of the Yuexiu District in Guangzhou City, Guangdong Province, southern China.
