= Meihuacun Subdistrict, Guangzhou =

Subdistrict of Guangzhou, China

Coordinates: 23.129093°N 113.309257°E

- Simplified Chinese: 梅花村街道
Transcriptions
Standard Mandarin
- Hanyu Pinyin: Méihuācūn Jiēdào
Yue: Cantonese
- Canton Romanization: mui4 fa1 qun1 gai1 dou6

Meihuacun is a subdistrict of the Yuexiu District in Guangzhou City, Guangdong Province, southern China.
