= Da-dong =

Neighborhood in Seoul, South Korea

- An alley connecting Namdaemun-ro 9-gil (2012)
- Interactive map of Da-dong
- Coordinates: 37°34′04″N 126°58′52″E
- Country: South Korea

Area
  - Total: 0.06 km^{2} (0.023 sq mi)

Korean name
- Hangul: 다동
- Hanja: 茶洞
- RR: Da-dong
- MR: Ta-dong

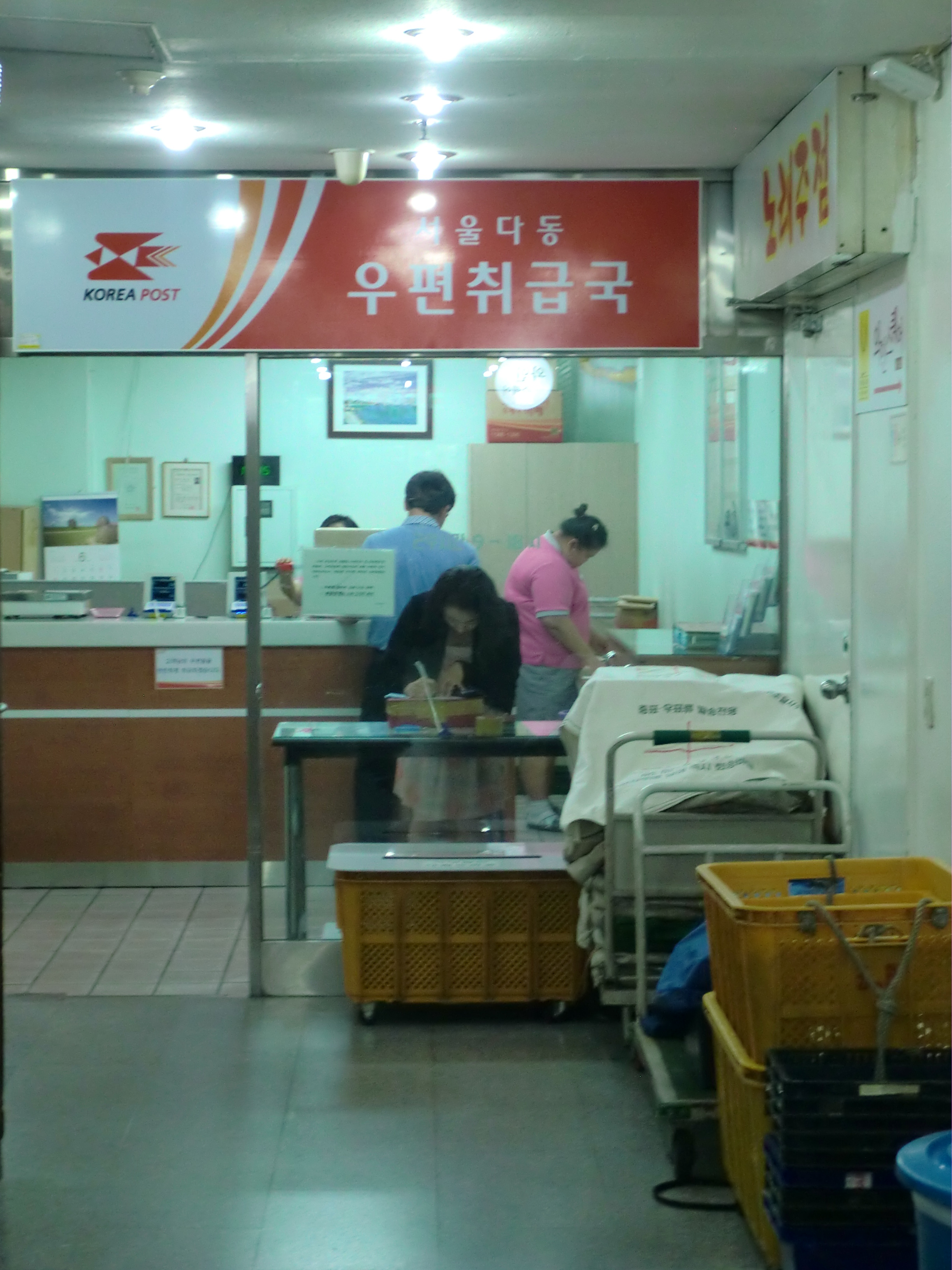
Seoul Da-dong Post office

Da-dong (Korean: 다동) is a legal dong (neighborhood) of Jung District, Seoul, South Korea. It is governed by its administrative dong, Myeong-dong.

== See also ==
- Administrative divisions of South Korea
