= Nonglin Subdistrict, Guangzhou =

Subdistrict of Guangzhou, China

Coordinates: 23.12637°N 113.29411°E

- Simplified Chinese: 农林街道
Transcriptions
Standard Mandarin
- Hanyu Pinyin: Nónglín Jiēdào
Yue: Cantonese
- Canton Romanization: nung4 lem4 gai1 dou6

Nonglin is a subdistrict of the Yuexiu District in Guangzhou City, Guangdong Province, Southern China.
