= Shishu Subdistrict, Guangzhou =

Subdistrict of Yuexiu District, Guangzhou, China

Coordinates: 23.119275°N 113.254618°E

- Simplified Chinese: 诗书街道
Transcriptions
Standard Mandarin
- Hanyu Pinyin: Shīshū Jiēdào
Yue: Cantonese
- Canton Romanization: xi1 xu1 gai1 dou6

Shishu is a subdistrict of the Yuexiu District in Guangzhou City, Guangdong Province, southern China.
