= Hongqiao Township, Yunnan =

Hongqiao Township 红桥乡
- Township
- Location in Yunnan
- Coordinates: 27°25′55″N 100°47′47″E
- Country: People's Republic of China
- Province: Yunnan
- Prefecture-level city: Lijiang
- Autonomous county: Ninglang
- Elevation: 2,446 m (8,025 ft)
- Time zone: UTC+8 (China Standard)

Hongqiao Township (simplified Chinese: 红桥乡; traditional Chinese: 紅橋鄉; pinyin: Hóngqiáo Xiāng; lit. 'red bridge') is a township of Ninglang Yi Autonomous County in northwestern Yunnan province, China, situated about 17 kilometres (11 mi) north-northwest of the county seat and 85 km (53 mi) northeast of Lijiang as the crow flies. As of 2011, it has 7 villages under its administration.
