= Hongqiao Subdistrict, Qidong =

Hongqiao Subdistrict 洪桥街道
- subdistrict
- Location in Hunan
- Coordinates: 26°47′17″N 112°07′11″E
- Country: People's Republic of China
- Province: Hunan
- Prefecture-level city: Hengyang
- County: Qidong
- Village-level division: 7 villages; 9 communities
- Elevation: 146 m (479 ft)
- Time zone: UTC+8 (China Standard)
- Postal code: 421600
- Area code: 0734

Hongqiao Subdistrict (simplified Chinese: 洪桥街道; traditional Chinese: 洪橋街道; pinyin: Hóngqiáo Jiēdào) is a subdistrict of Qidong County in Hunan, China. It was one of four subdistricts approved to establish in 2014. The subdistrict has an area of 64.31 km^{2} (24.83 sq mi) with a population of 88,300 (as of 2014). Through the amalgamation of village-level divisions in 2016, the subdistrict of Hongqiao has 7 villages and 9 communities under its jurisdiction, and its seat is at Dingshan East Road (鼎山东路). It is served by China National Highway 322.

== Subdivisions ==
The subdistrict of Yongchang had 21 villages and 9 communities at its establishment in 2014. Its divisions were reduced to 16 from 30 through the amalgamation of villages in 2016, it has 7 villages and 9 communities under its jurisdiction.

7 villages

- Dingxing Village (鼎兴村)
- Dongfu Xincun Village (东富新村)
- Hongqiao Village (洪桥村)
- Matou Village (马头村)
- Shangbo Village (上波村)
- Taohuayuan Village (桃花源村)
- Yunhe Village (云鹤村)

9 communities

- Baiyun Community (白云社区)
- Daqiao Community (大桥社区)
- Daxiao Community (达孝社区)
- Jingtang Community (井塘社区)
- Nanshan Community (南山社区)
- Panlong Community (盘龙社区)
- Qiyuan Community (憩园社区)
- Shangzheng Community (上正社区)
- Yicheng Community (益城社区)

== See also ==
- List of township-level divisions of Hunan
