= Hongqiao Township, Sichuan =

Hongqiao Township 虹桥乡
- Township
- Location in Sichuan
- Coordinates: 32°13′43″N 107°46′58″E
- Country: People's Republic of China
- Province: Sichuan
- Prefecture-level city: Dazhou
- County-level city: Wanyuan
- Elevation: 645 m (2,116 ft)
- Time zone: UTC+8 (China Standard)

Hongqiao Township (simplified Chinese: 虹桥乡; traditional Chinese: 虹橋鄉; pinyin: Hóngqiáo Xiāng; lit. 'rainbow bridge') is a township under the administration of Wanyuan City in far northeastern Sichuan province, China, situated about 3 kilometres (1.9 mi) from the border with Shaanxi and 29 km (18 mi) northwest of downtown Wanyuan as the crow flies. As of 2011, it has 5 villages under its administration.
