= Dadong Subdistrict, Guangzhou =

Subdistrict of Guangzhou, China

Coordinates: 23.12634°N 113.28130°E

- Simplified Chinese: 大东街道
Transcriptions
Standard Mandarin
- Hanyu Pinyin: Dàdōng Jiēdào
Yue: Cantonese
- Canton Romanization: dai6 dung1 gai1 dou6

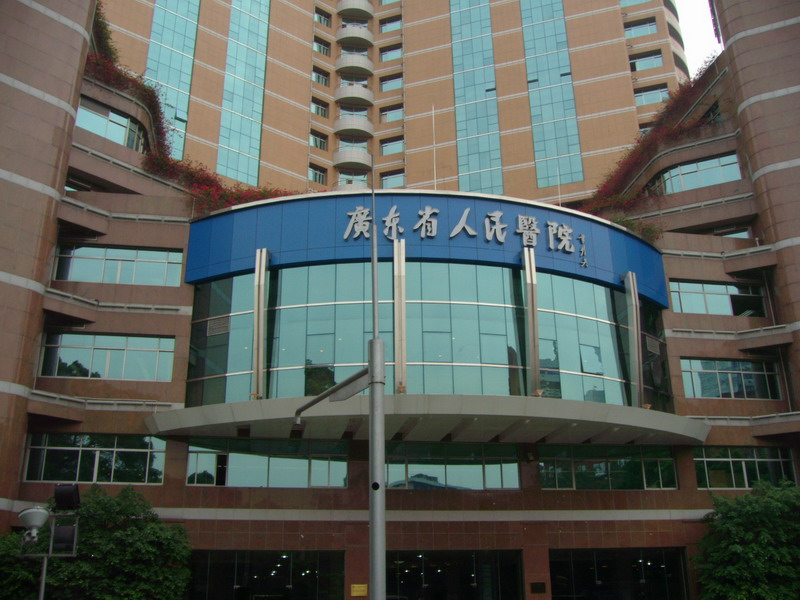

Dadong is a subdistrict of the Yuexiu District in Guangzhou City, Guangdong Province, southern China.
