= Hongqiao Subdistrict, Wusu =

Hongqiao Subdistrict 虹桥街道
- Subdistrict
- Location in Xinjiang
- Coordinates: 44°26′04″N 84°41′03″E
- Country: People's Republic of China
- Region: Xinjiang
- Prefecture: Tacheng
- County-level city: Wusu
- Elevation: 468 m (1,535 ft)
- Time zone: UTC+8 (China Standard)
- Postal code: 833000
- Area code: 0992

Hongqiao Subdistrict (simplified Chinese: 虹桥街道; traditional Chinese: 虹橋街道; pinyin: Hóngqiáo Jiēdào; lit. 'rainbow bridge') is a subdistrict of Wusu City, Xinjiang, People's Republic of China, located at the heart of the city's urban core. As of 2011, it has 5 residential communities (社区) under its administration.

== See also ==
- List of township-level divisions of Xinjiang
