= Hongqiao Subdistrict, Aksu =

Hongqiao Subdistrict 红桥街道 قىزىل كۆۋرۈك كوچا باشقارمىسى
- Subdistrict
- Location in Xinjiang
- Coordinates: 41°10′12″N 80°15′20″E
- Country: People's Republic of China
- Region: Xinjiang
- Prefecture: Aksu
- County-level city: Aksu
- Elevation: 1,105 m (3,625 ft)
- Time zone: UTC+8 (China Standard)
- Postal code: 843000
- Area code: 0997

Hongqiao Subdistrict (simplified Chinese: 红桥街道; traditional Chinese: 紅橋街道; pinyin: Hóngqiáo Jiēdào; lit. 'red bridge', قىزىل كۆۋرۈك كوچا باشقارمىسى) is a subdistrict of Aksu City, Xinjiang, People's Republic of China, located at the heart of the city's urban core. As of 2011, it has 5 residential communities (社区) under its administration.

== See also ==
- List of township-level divisions of Xinjiang
