= Zhuguang Subdistrict, Guangzhou =

Subdistrict of Guangzhou, China

Coordinates: 23.118918°N 113.273814°E

- Simplified Chinese: 珠光街道
Transcriptions
Standard Mandarin
- Hanyu Pinyin: Zhūguāng Jiēdào
Yue: Cantonese
- Canton Romanization: ju1 guong1 gai1 dou6

Zhuguang is a subdistrict of the Yuexiu District in Guangzhou City, Guangdong Province, southern China.
