= Hongqiao, Minhang =

Hongqiao 虹桥镇
- Town
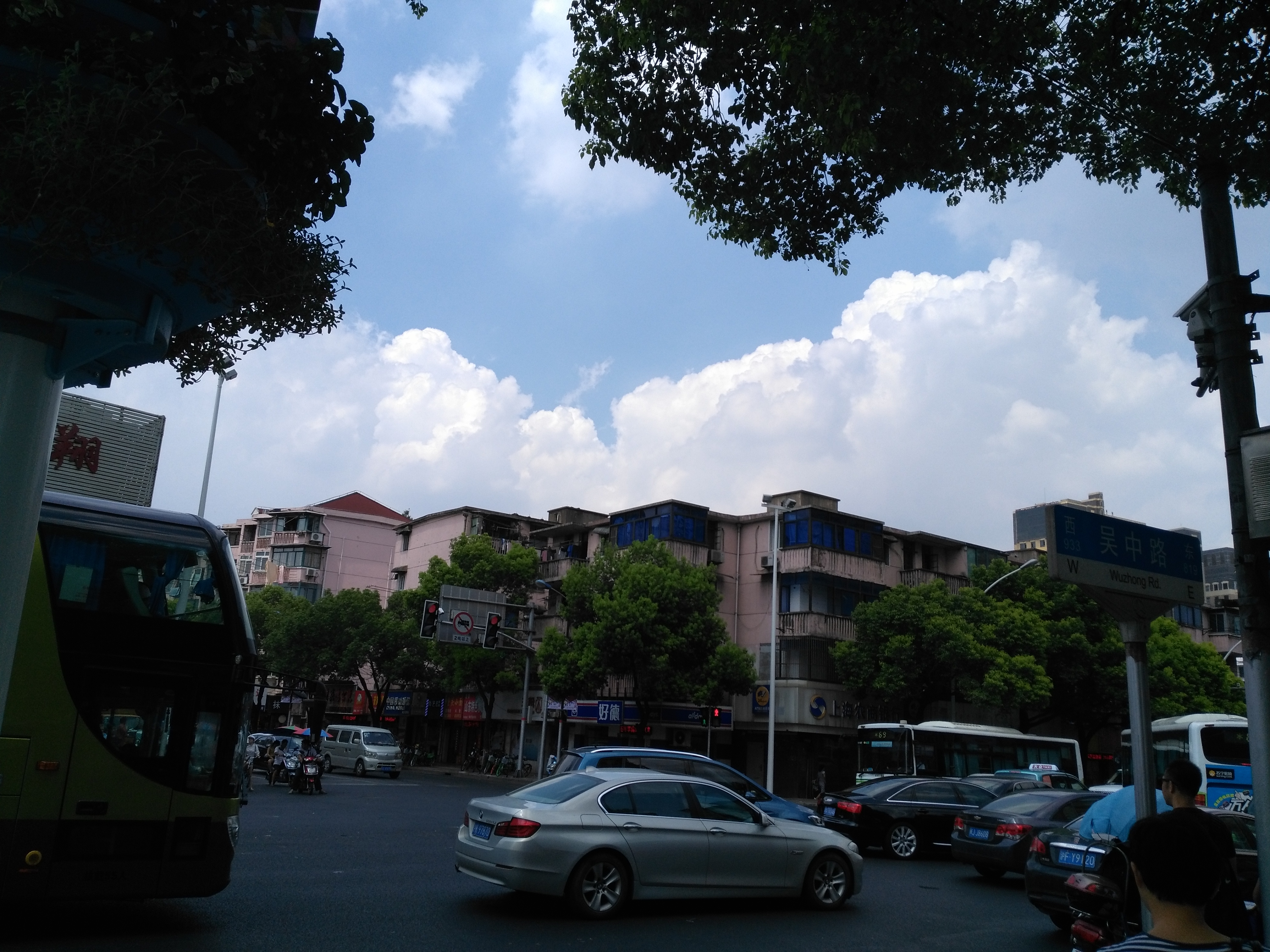

- Location in Shanghai
- Coordinates: 31°10′39″N 121°23′05″E
- Country: People's Republic of China
- Municipality: Shanghai
- District: Minhang
- Village-level divisions: 33 residential communities
- Elevation: 9 m (30 ft)
- Time zone: UTC+8 (China Standard)
- Postal code: 201103
- Area code: 021

Hongqiao (simplified Chinese: 虹桥; traditional Chinese: 虹橋; pinyin: Hóngqiáo; lit. 'a bridge where rainbow can be seen'; Shanghainese: ghon^{1}jiau^{1}) is a town in Minhang District, in the western suburbs of Shanghai. As of 2011, it has 33 residential communities (居委会) under its administration.

== See also ==
- List of township-level divisions of Shanghai
