= Hongqiao Subdistrict, Xuanwei =

Hongqiao Subdistrict 虹桥街道
- Subdistrict
- Location in Yunnan
- Coordinates: 26°09′40″N 104°05′18″E
- Country: People's Republic of China
- Province: Yunnan
- Prefecture-level city: Qujing
- County-level city: Xuanwei
- Elevation: 1,979 m (6,493 ft)
- Time zone: UTC+8 (China Standard)

Hongqiao Subdistrict (simplified Chinese: 虹桥街道; traditional Chinese: 虹橋街道; pinyin: Hóngqiáo Jiēdào; lit. 'rainbow bridge') is a subdistrict of Xuanwei City, Yunnan, People's Republic of China, located in the southern suburbs of the city 6 kilometres (3.7 mi) from downtown. As of 2011, it has 3 residential communities (社区) and 1 village under its administration.
