= Qidong County =

Qidong County 祁东县
- County
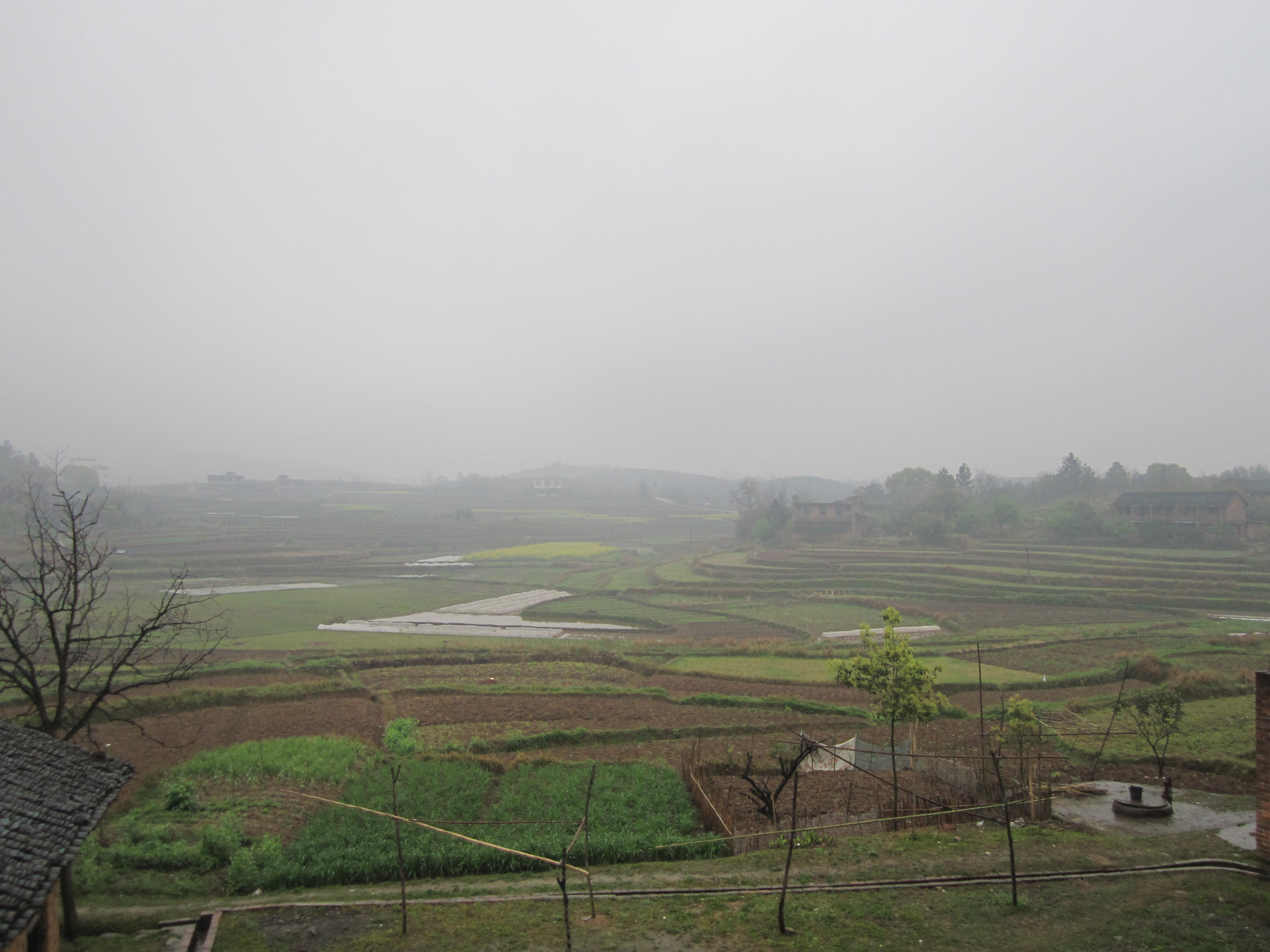

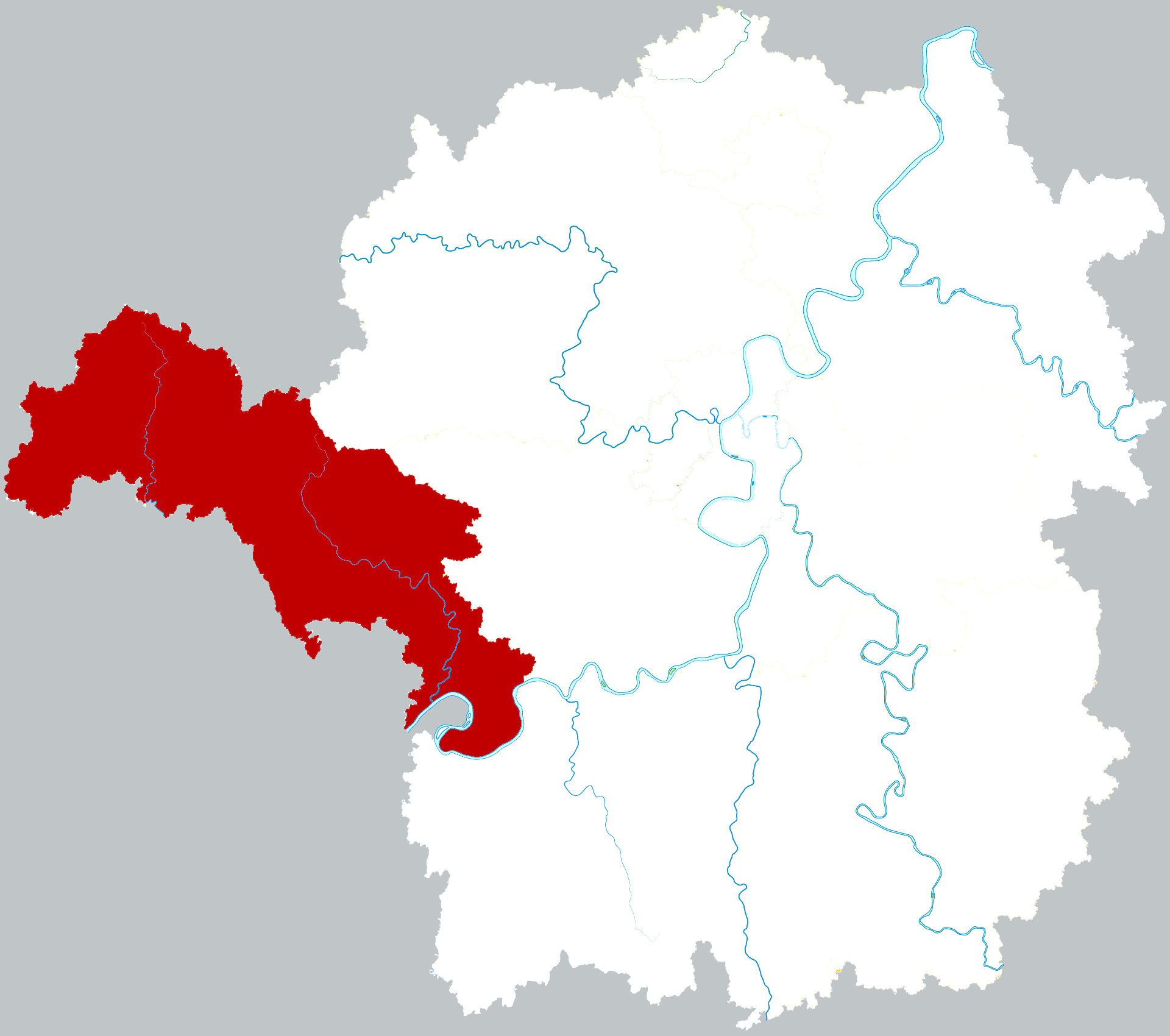
- Location in Hengyang

- Location in Hunan
- Coordinates: 26°47′59″N 112°05′26″E
- Country: People's Republic of China
- Province: Hunan
- Prefecture-level city: Hengyang
- Time zone: UTC+8 (China Standard)
- Postal code: 421600

Qidong County (simplified Chinese: 祁东县; traditional Chinese: 祁東縣; pinyin: Qídōng Xiàn; lit. 'the east of Qiyang') is a county and the 8th most populous county-level division in the Province of Hunan, China; it is under the administration of Hengyang prefecture-level city. The county was formed from the eastern part of Qiyang County in April 1952 and was named after the east of Qiyang. Qidong County covers an area of 1,872 km^{2} (723 sq mi), and as of 2015, it had a registered population of 1,067,000. The county has four subdistricts, 17 towns and three townships under its jurisdiction, and the county seat is Hongqiao Subdistrict (洪桥街道).

== Geography ==
Located in the central south of Hunan Province, the county is bordered to the north by Hengyang and Shaodong Counties, to the west by Shaoyang and Dong'an Counties, to the south by Lengshuitan District of Yongzhou, Qiyang County, and to the east by Changning City and Hengnan County.

Qidong means the east of Qiyang County, the county was named after its location. It lies in the southwest of Hengyang and the northern bank of the middle reaches of the Xiang River. It is long and narrow from east to west, with higher altitudes in the north and low in the south. The terrain is tilted northwest to southeast, with the Siming Mountains encroaching on the west, and the Qishan Mountains stretching on the southwest, the generalized Dayun Mountains runs through the northeastern portion with the county seat at its feet. The Xiang-Gui railway, Xiang-Gui High-speed Railway, G322 National Highway, G72 Quannan Expressway, Hunan provincial route S210 and S317 have passed through its territory. The county is known as the Gorgeous Throat of Xiang-Gui.

== Climate ==
Climate data for Qidong, elevation 219 m (719 ft), (1991–2020 normals, extremes 1963-present)
Month	Jan	Feb	Mar	Apr	May	Jun	Jul	Aug	Sep	Oct	Nov	Dec	Year
Record high °C (°F)	27.1 (80.8)	31.1 (88.0)	34.8 (94.6)	35.9 (96.6)	36.3 (97.3)	38.5 (101.3)	39.4 (102.9)	40.6 (105.1)	39.3 (102.7)	35.9 (96.6)	32.6 (90.7)	25.5 (77.9)	40.6 (105.1)
Mean daily maximum °C (°F)	9.6 (49.3)	12.3 (54.1)	16.4 (61.5)	23.1 (73.6)	27.6 (81.7)	30.7 (87.3)	34.1 (93.4)	33.4 (92.1)	29.7 (85.5)	24.4 (75.9)	18.7 (65.7)	12.5 (54.5)	22.7 (72.9)
Daily mean °C (°F)	6.2 (43.2)	8.6 (47.5)	12.4 (54.3)	18.4 (65.1)	23.1 (73.6)	26.6 (79.9)	29.5 (85.1)	28.8 (83.8)	25.1 (77.2)	19.8 (67.6)	14.1 (57.4)	8.4 (47.1)	18.4 (65.2)
Mean daily minimum °C (°F)	4.0 (39.2)	6.0 (42.8)	9.6 (49.3)	15.1 (59.2)	19.7 (67.5)	23.5 (74.3)	25.9 (78.6)	25.4 (77.7)	21.7 (71.1)	16.5 (61.7)	10.9 (51.6)	5.7 (42.3)	15.3 (59.6)
Record low °C (°F)	−6.5 (20.3)	−5.5 (22.1)	−0.5 (31.1)	3.1 (37.6)	10.0 (50.0)	13.8 (56.8)	18.8 (65.8)	18.9 (66.0)	12.8 (55.0)	4.0 (39.2)	−0.5 (31.1)	−6.7 (19.9)	−6.7 (19.9)
Average precipitation mm (inches)	69.0 (2.72)	75.4 (2.97)	141.7 (5.58)	137.0 (5.39)	171.6 (6.76)	177.8 (7.00)	145.8 (5.74)	115.6 (4.55)	48.5 (1.91)	59.1 (2.33)	75.9 (2.99)	52.9 (2.08)	1,270.3 (50.02)
Average precipitation days (≥ 0.1 mm)	14.5	13.7	17.6	16.1	15.5	14.8	10.4	11.0	8.5	8.5	9.8	10.2	150.6
Average snowy days	3.4	1.8	0.4	0	0	0	0	0	0	0	0	0.9	6.5
Average relative humidity (%)	78	78	80	79	78	80	72	73	73	72	74	73	76
Mean monthly sunshine hours	60.3	58.1	69.3	101.4	126.7	132.6	222.4	199.2	149.4	122.9	110.4	94.0	1,446.7
Percentage possible sunshine	18	18	19	26	30	32	53	50	41	35	34	29	32
Source: China Meteorological Administration All-time September high

== Subdivisions ==
4 subdistricts

- Baihe (白鹤街道)
- Hongqiao (洪桥街道)
- Yongchang (永昌街道)
- Yuhe (玉合街道)

3 townships

- Chenglian (城连圩乡)
- Fengdiping (凤歧坪乡)
- Maduqiao (马杜桥乡)

17 towns

- Baidishi (白地市镇)
- Buyunqiao (步云桥镇)
- Diaojiang (鸟江镇)
- Fengshiyan (风石堰镇)
- Guanjiazui (官家嘴镇)
- Guiyang (归阳镇)
- Guoshuiping (过水坪镇)
- Hezhou (河洲镇)
- Huangtupu (黄土铺镇)
- Jiangjia (蒋家桥镇)
- Jinqiao (金桥镇)
- Liangshi (粮市镇)
- Lingguan (灵官镇)
- Shitingzi (石亭子镇)
- Shuangqiao (双桥镇)
- Taihetang (太和堂镇)
- Zhuantang (砖塘镇)

== Economy ==
According to preliminary accounting of the statistical authority, the gross domestic product of Qidong County in 2017 was 29,636 million yuan (4,389 million US dollars), up by 8.9 percent over the previous year. Of this total, the value added of the primary industry was 6,840 million yuan (1,013 million US dollars), up by 3.2 percent, that of the secondary industry was 9,908 million yuan (1,467 million US dollars), up by 7.5 percent and that of the tertiary industry was 12,889 million yuan (1,909 million US dollars), up by 13.5 percent. The value added of the primary industry accounted for 23.08 percent of the GDP; that of the secondary industry accounted for 33.43 percent; and that of the tertiary industry accounted for 43.49 percent. The per capita GDP in 2017 was 29,827 yuan (4,418 US dollars).

== Culture ==
The county's dialect belongs to the Old Xiang group.
