= Jiang'an County =

Jiang'an County 江安县
- County
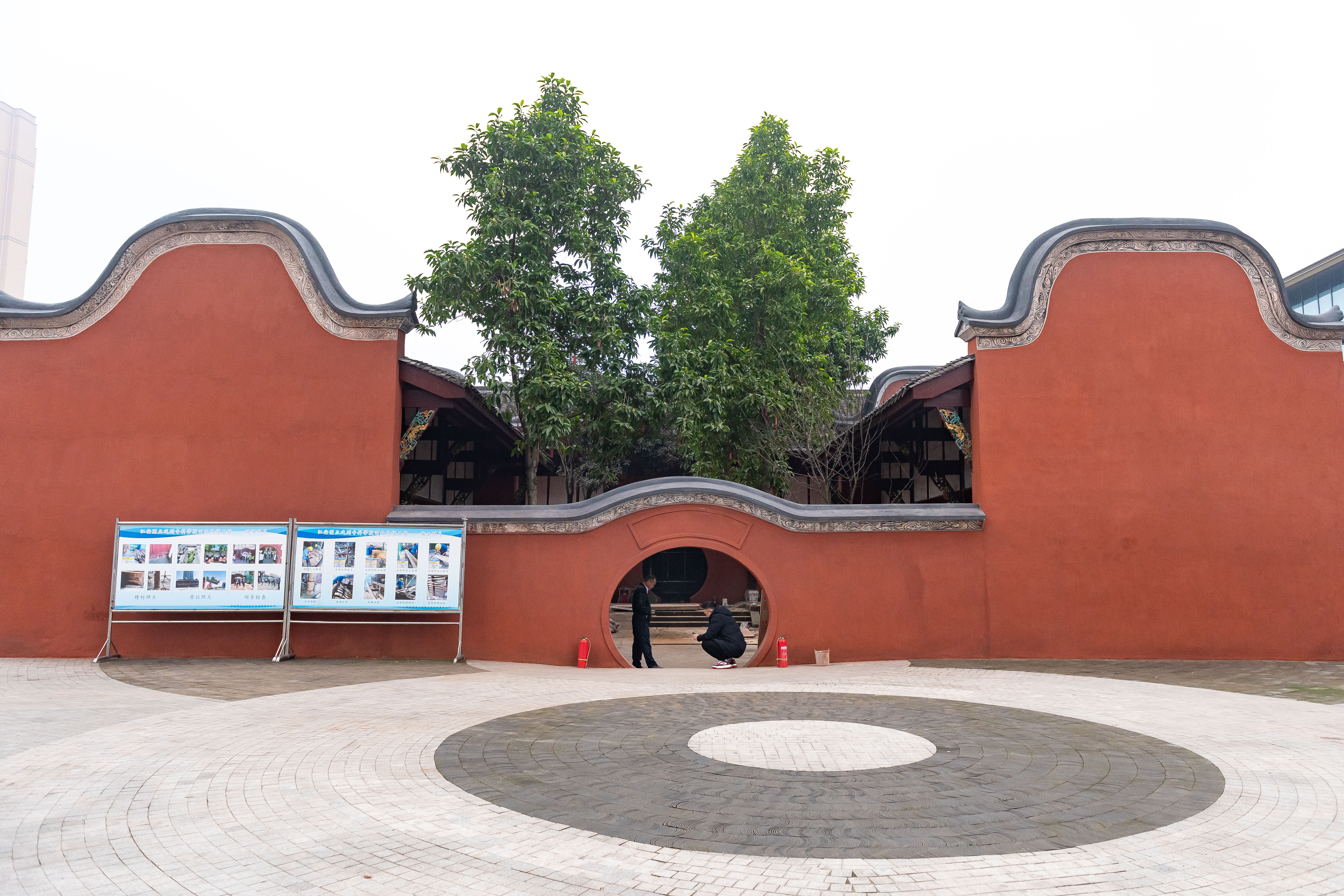

- Location of the seat in Sichuan
- Coordinates: 28°41′24″N 105°06′22″E
- Country: China
- Province: Sichuan
- Prefecture-level city: Yibin

Area
  - Total: 912 km^{2} (352 sq mi)

Population (2020 census)
  - Total: 424,470
  - Density: 465/km^{2} (1,210/sq mi)
- Time zone: UTC+8 (China Standard)

Jiang'an (Chinese: 江安; pinyin: Jiāng'ān) is a county of Sichuan Province, China. It is under the administration of Yibin city.

Jiang'an has one Yangtze River crossing, the Jiang'an Yangtze River Bridge.

== Administrative divisions ==
Jiang'an County comprises 14 towns:

- Jiang'an 江安镇
- Hongqiao 红桥镇
- Yile 怡乐镇
- Liugeng 留耕镇
- Wukuang 五矿镇
- Ying'an 迎安镇
- Xijiashan 夕佳山镇
- Tieqing 铁清镇
- Simianshan 四面山镇
- Dajing 大井镇
- Yangchun 阳春镇
- Damiao 大妙镇
- Renhe 仁和镇
- Xiachang 下长镇

== Climate ==
Climate data for Jiang'an, elevation 263 m (863 ft), (1991–2020 normals, extremes 1981–present)
Month	Jan	Feb	Mar	Apr	May	Jun	Jul	Aug	Sep	Oct	Nov	Dec	Year
Record high °C (°F)	19.1 (66.4)	24.1 (75.4)	31.9 (89.4)	35.4 (95.7)	37.2 (99.0)	36.8 (98.2)	37.8 (100.0)	41.4 (106.5)	39.0 (102.2)	32.7 (90.9)	25.6 (78.1)	19.2 (66.6)	41.4 (106.5)
Mean daily maximum °C (°F)	10.2 (50.4)	13.8 (56.8)	18.7 (65.7)	24.0 (75.2)	27.3 (81.1)	28.9 (84.0)	32.1 (89.8)	32.2 (90.0)	27.8 (82.0)	22.0 (71.6)	17.3 (63.1)	11.7 (53.1)	22.2 (71.9)
Daily mean °C (°F)	7.7 (45.9)	10.4 (50.7)	14.3 (57.7)	19.0 (66.2)	22.4 (72.3)	24.4 (75.9)	27.2 (81.0)	27.0 (80.6)	23.3 (73.9)	18.7 (65.7)	14.2 (57.6)	9.2 (48.6)	18.2 (64.7)
Mean daily minimum °C (°F)	5.9 (42.6)	8.0 (46.4)	11.2 (52.2)	15.5 (59.9)	18.8 (65.8)	21.3 (70.3)	23.6 (74.5)	23.4 (74.1)	20.5 (68.9)	16.6 (61.9)	12.2 (54.0)	7.6 (45.7)	15.4 (59.7)
Record low °C (°F)	−0.9 (30.4)	0.1 (32.2)	1.2 (34.2)	6.7 (44.1)	10.1 (50.2)	14.9 (58.8)	17.8 (64.0)	18.0 (64.4)	14.4 (57.9)	6.7 (44.1)	1.7 (35.1)	−1.9 (28.6)	−1.9 (28.6)
Average precipitation mm (inches)	28.0 (1.10)	23.7 (0.93)	36.7 (1.44)	76.8 (3.02)	108.9 (4.29)	170.7 (6.72)	188.7 (7.43)	146.3 (5.76)	122.1 (4.81)	69.5 (2.74)	42.8 (1.69)	26.0 (1.02)	1,040.2 (40.95)
Average precipitation days (≥ 0.1 mm)	13.8	10.3	12.8	13.6	15.5	17.8	13.3	11.6	14.4	16.6	12.7	12.4	164.8
Average snowy days	0.2	0.1	0	0	0	0	0	0	0	0	0	0.1	0.4
Average relative humidity (%)	88	84	79	79	80	85	84	81	85	88	88	88	84
Mean monthly sunshine hours	24.0	45.9	89.1	117.7	121.8	102.6	159.4	169.8	103.0	51.0	38.8	21.4	1,044.5
Percentage possible sunshine	7	14	24	30	29	25	38	42	28	15	12	7	23
Source: China Meteorological Administrationall-time extreme temperatureAll-time Jun Record low
