= Hongqiao, Changning =

Hongqiao Subdistrict 虹桥街道
- Subdistrict
- Interactive map of Hongqiao Subdistrict
- Coordinates: 31°11′57″N 121°24′16″E
- Country: People's Republic of China
- Municipality: Shanghai
- District: Changning
- Village-level divisions: 16 residential communities
- Elevation: 6 m (20 ft)
- Time zone: UTC+8 (China Standard)
- Postal code: 200051
- Area code: 0021

Hongqiao (Note: simplified Chinese: 虹桥街道; traditional Chinese: 虹橋街道; pinyin: Hóngqiáo Jiēdào; Shanghainese: ghon^{1}jiau^{1} ka^{1}dau^{2}) is a subdistrict of Changning, Shanghai. As of 2011, it has 16 residential communities (社区) under its administration.

== See also ==
- Shanghai Hongqiao International Airport
- List of township-level divisions of Shanghai
