= Hongqiao Subdistrict, Guangzhou =

Hongqiao Subdistrict 洪桥街道
- Subdistrict
- Location in Guangdong
- Coordinates: 23°08′11″N 113°15′58″E
- Country: People's Republic of China
- Province: Guangdong
- Sub-provincial city: Guangzhou
- District: Yuexiu
- Elevation: 21 m (69 ft)
- Time zone: UTC+8 (China Standard)
- Postal code: 510030
- Area code: 0020

Hongqiao Subdistrict (simplified Chinese: 洪桥街道; traditional Chinese: 洪橋街道; pinyin: Hóngqiáo Jiēdào; lit. 'great bridge') is a subdistrict of Yuexiu District in the heart of Guangzhou, located near important landmarks such as Zhenhai Tower and the Sun Yat-sen Memorial Hall. As of 2011, it has 11 residential communities (社区) under its administration.

== See also ==
- List of township-level divisions of Guangdong
