= Yuexiu, Guangzhou =

District in Guangdong, China

Yuexiu 越秀区
- District
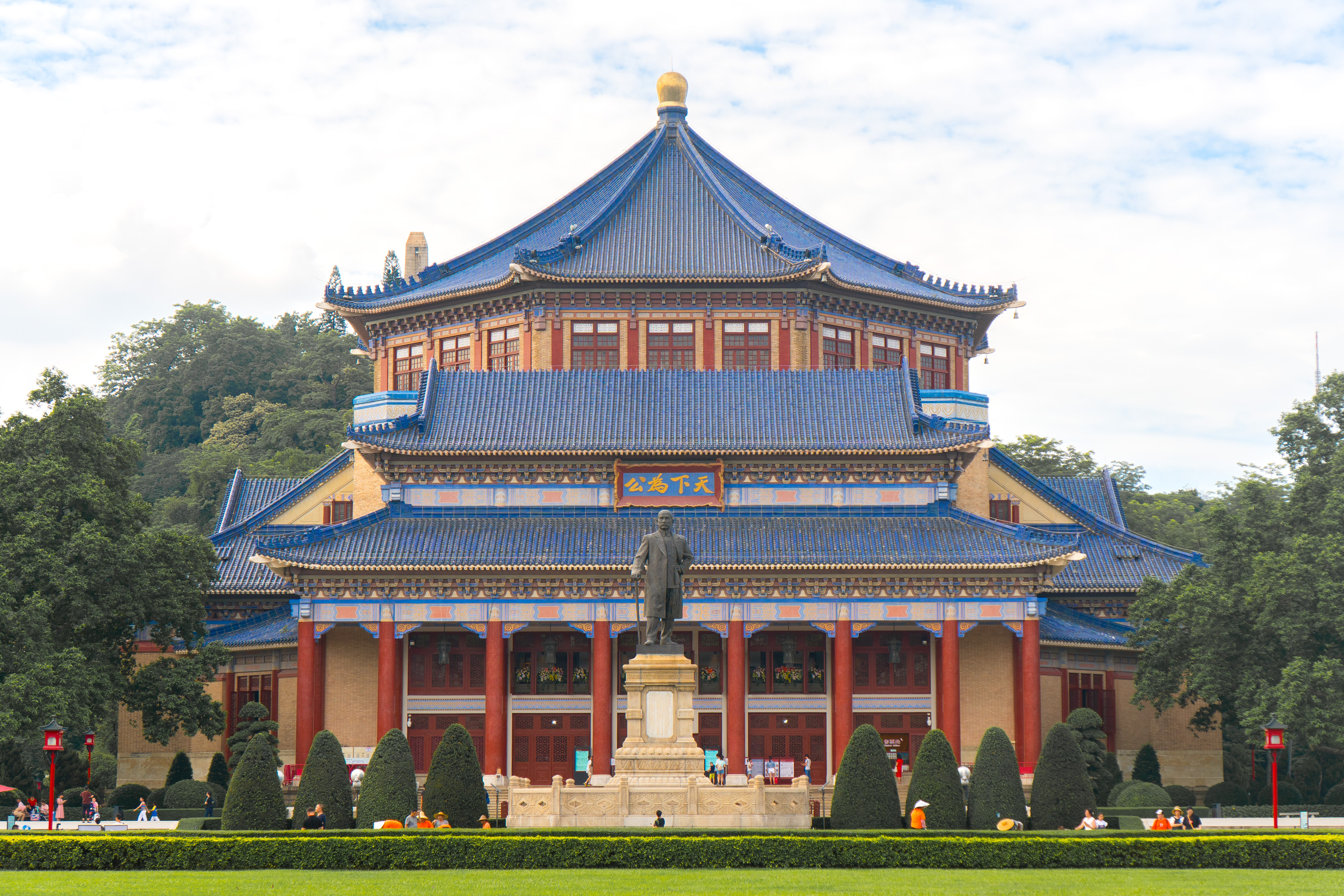
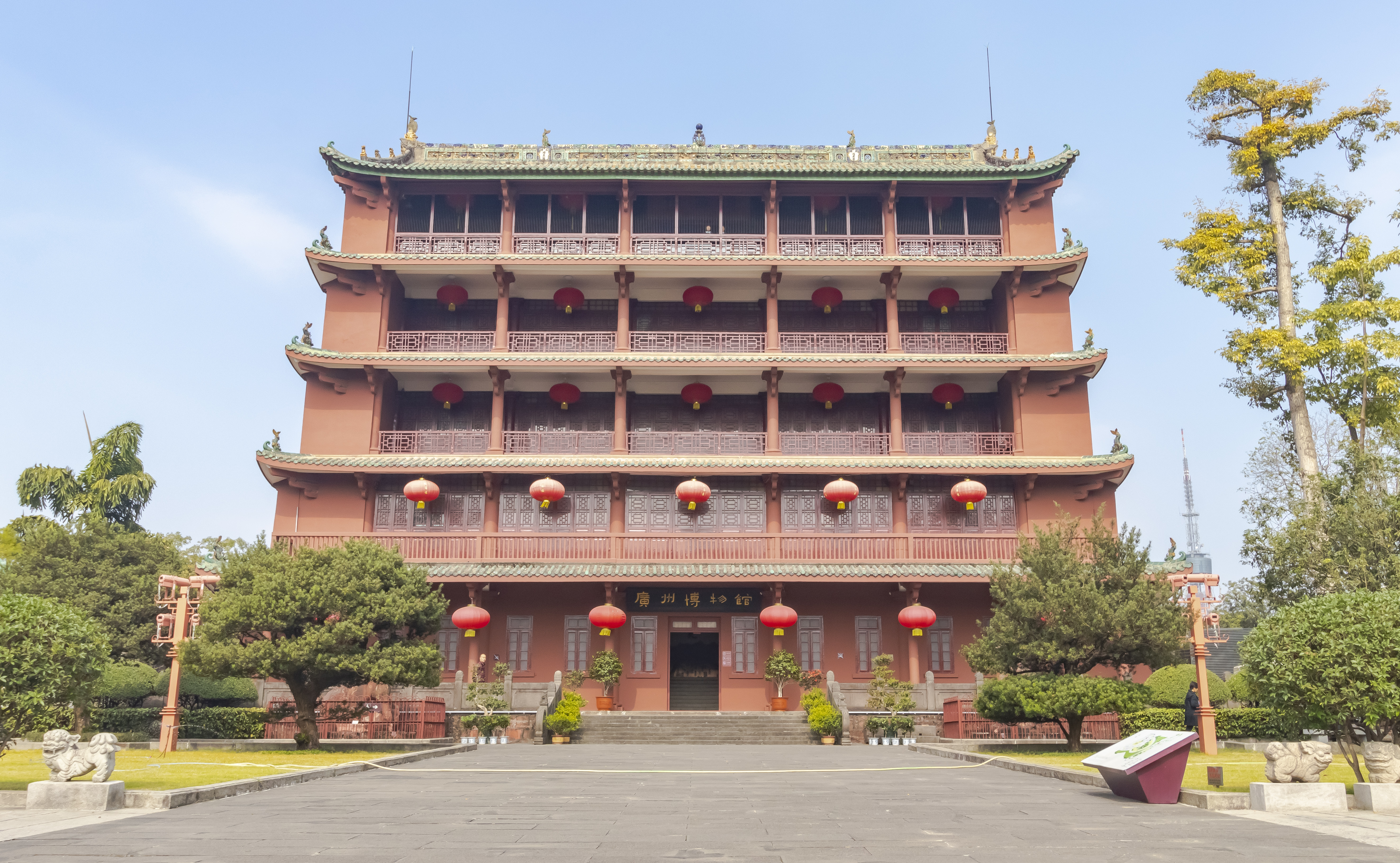
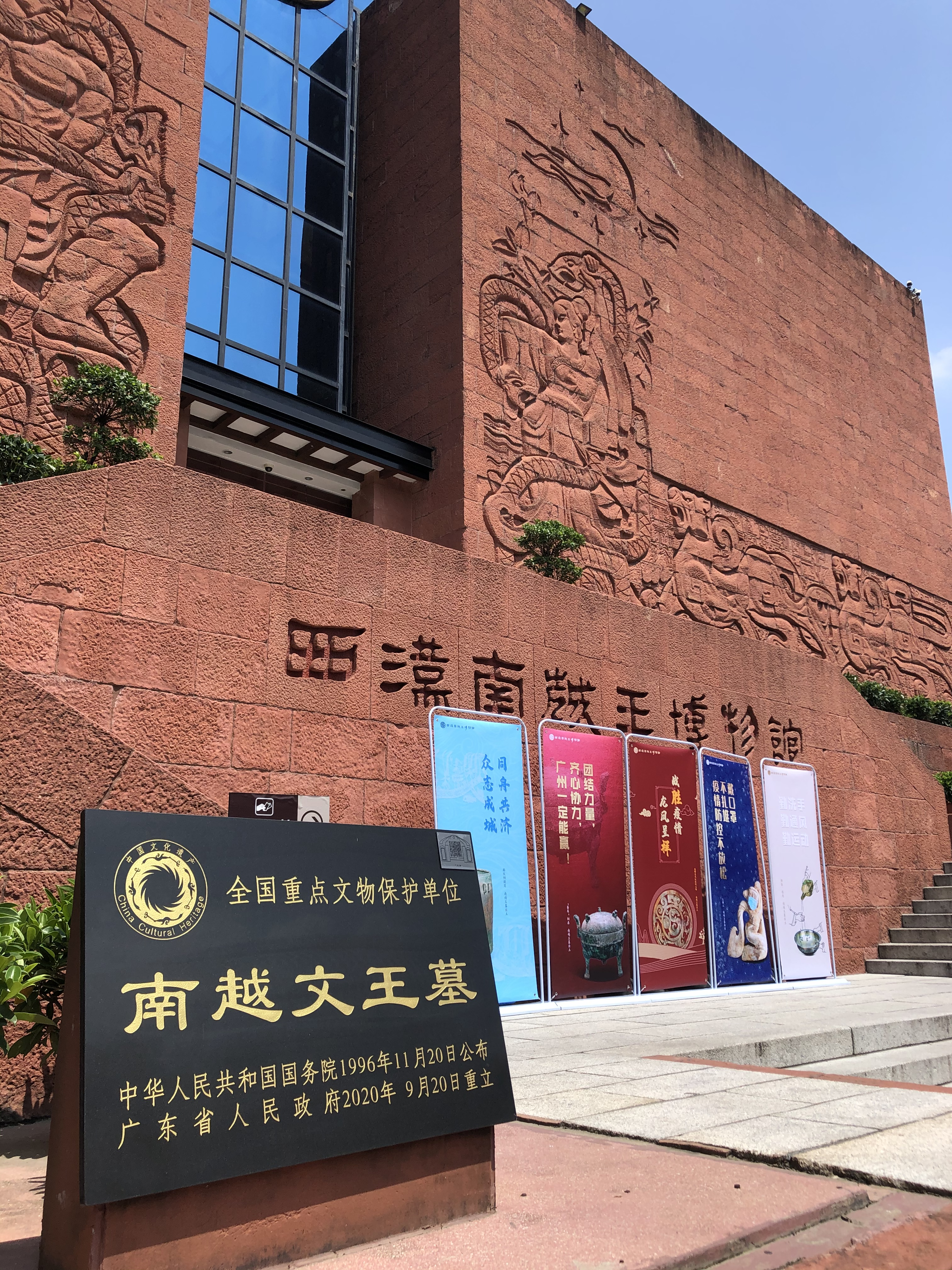
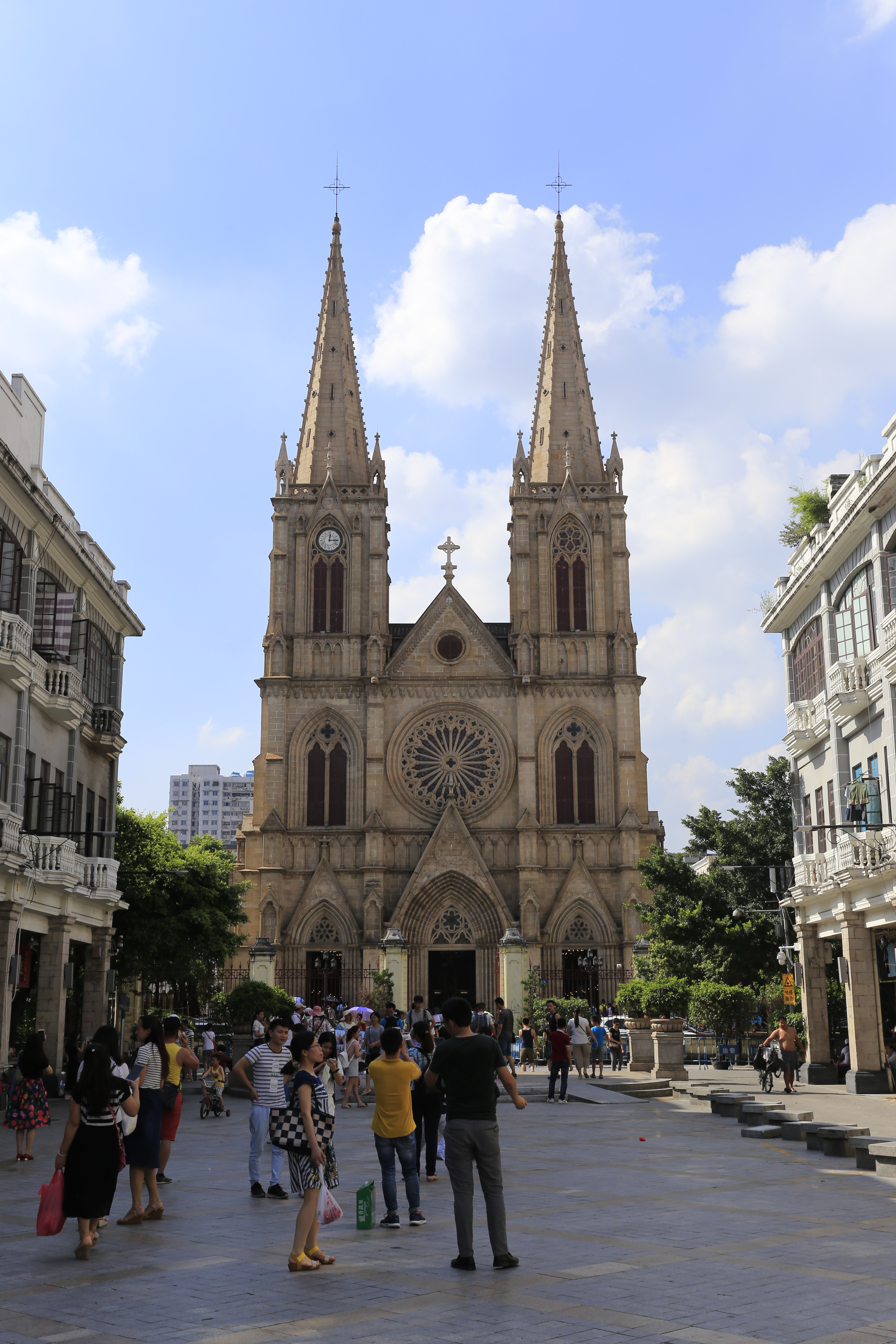
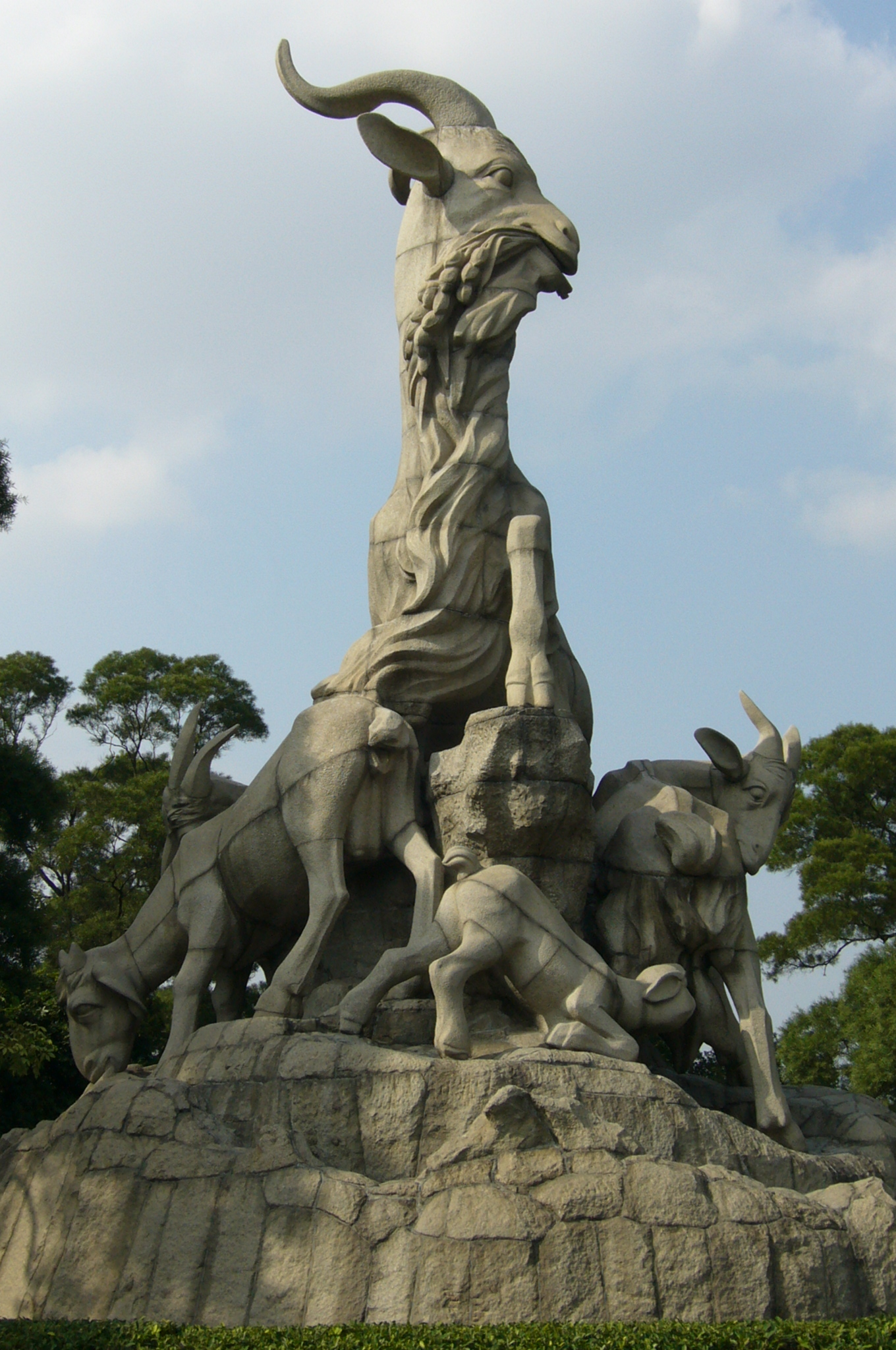
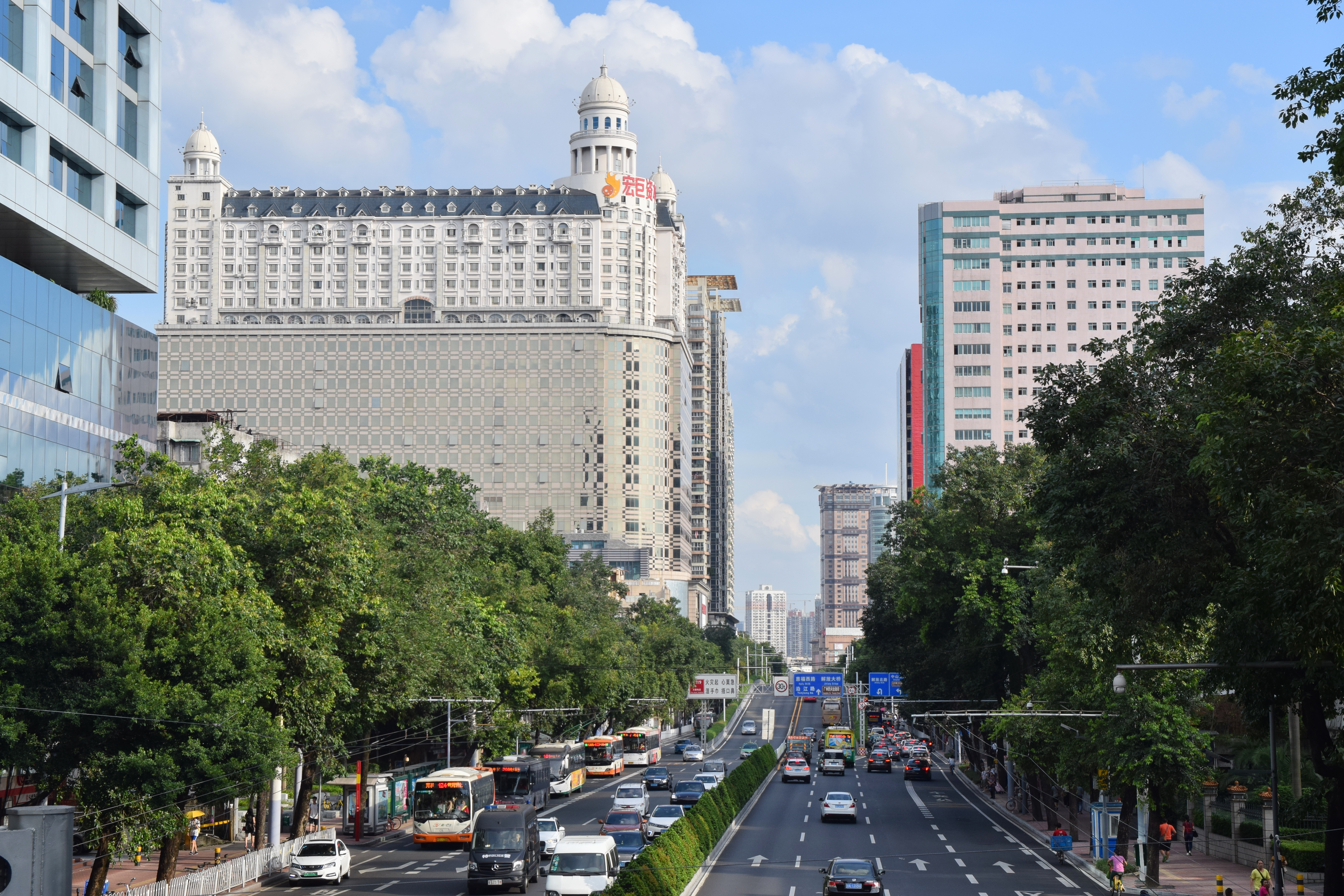
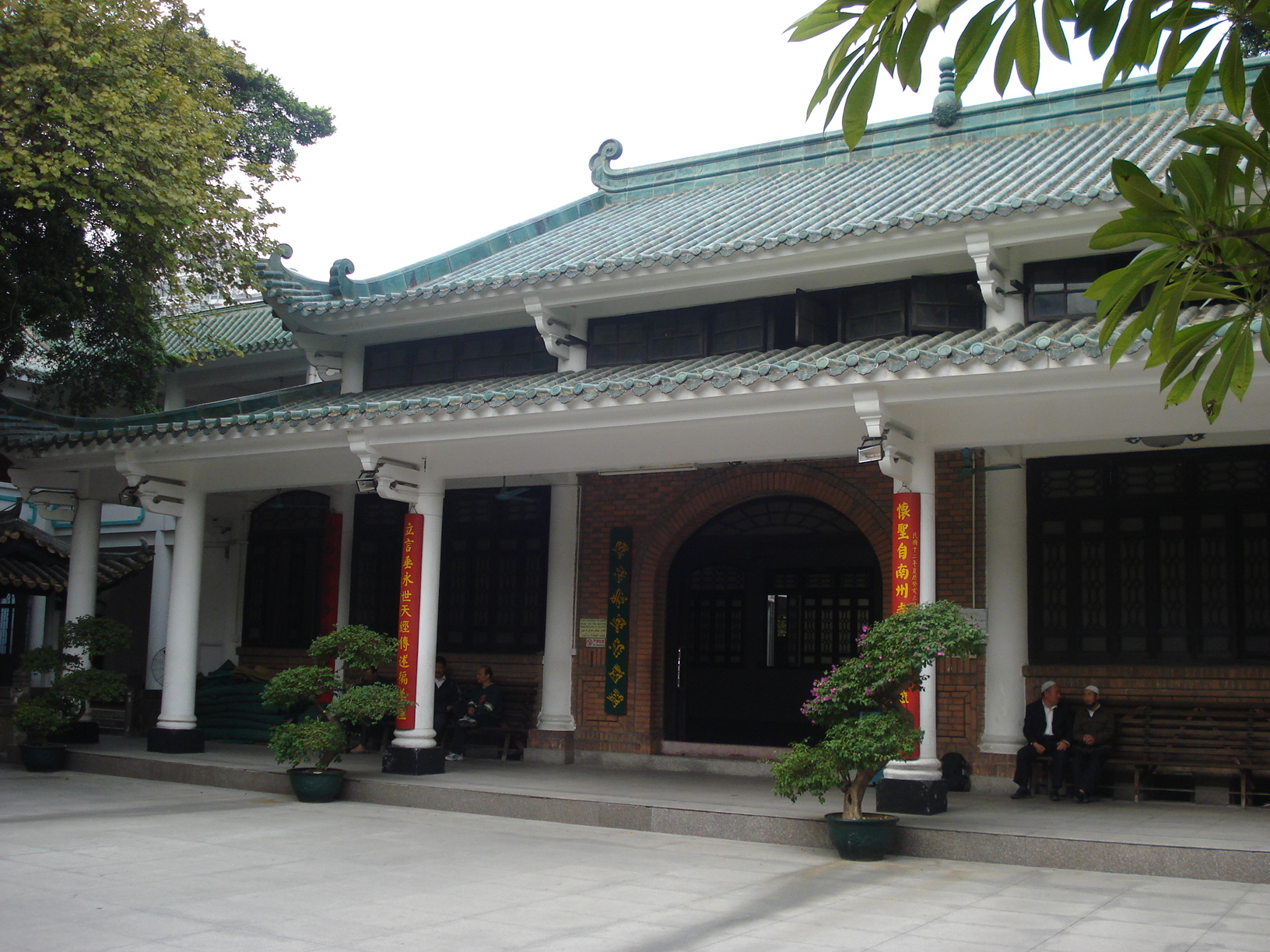
- Sun Yat-sen Memorial Hall Zhenhai Tower Museum of the Mausoleum of the Nanyue King Sacred Heart Cathedral Yuexiu Park Guangta Subdistrict Huaisheng Mosque

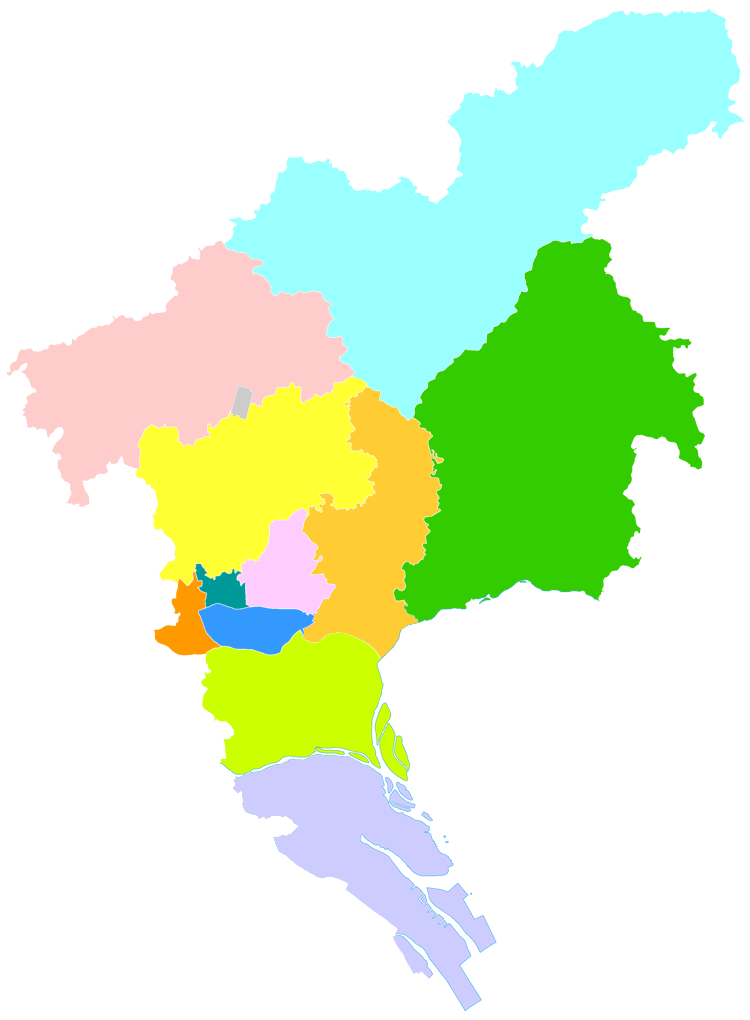
- Yuexiu in Guangzhou
- Coordinates: 23.137°N 113.258°E
- Country: People's Republic of China
- Province: Guangdong
- Sub-provincial city: Guangzhou

Area
  - Total: 32.82 km^{2} (12.67 sq mi)

Population (2014)
  - Total: 1,146,500
  - Density: 34,930/km^{2} (90,480/sq mi)
- Time zone: UTC+8 (China Standard)
- Postal code: 510030
- Area code: 020
- Website: www.yuexiu.gov.cn

Yuexiu, Guangzhou
- Simplified Chinese: 越秀区
- Traditional Chinese: 越秀區
- Jyutping: jyut6 sau3 keoi1
- Hanyu Pinyin: Yuèxiù Qū
Transcriptions
Standard Mandarin
- Hanyu Pinyin: Yuèxiù Qū
Yue: Cantonese
- Yale Romanization: Yuhtsau Kēui
- Jyutping: jyut6 sau3 keoi1
- Canton Romanization: yud6 seo3 kêu1
- IPA: [jyt̚˨.sɐw˧]

Alternative Chinese name
- Chinese: 越秀
- Jyutping: jyut6 sau3
- Hanyu Pinyin: Yuèxiù
Transcriptions
Standard Mandarin
- Hanyu Pinyin: Yuèxiù
Yue: Cantonese
- Yale Romanization: Yuhtsau
- Jyutping: jyut6 sau3
- Canton Romanization: yud6 seo3

Second alternative Chinese name
- Simplified Chinese: 东山
- Traditional Chinese: 東山
- Jyutping: dung1 saan1
- Hanyu Pinyin: Dōngshān
Transcriptions
Standard Mandarin
- Hanyu Pinyin: Dōngshān
Yue: Cantonese
- Yale Romanization: Dūngsāan
- Jyutping: dung1 saan1
- Canton Romanization: dung1 san1

Yuexiu District (Chinese: 越秀区; Jyutping: jyut6 sau3 keoi1) is one of 11 urban districts and the seat of the prefecture-level city of Guangzhou, the capital of Guangdong Province, China, located west of the Tianhe District and east of the Liwan District. It is the commercial, political and cultural centre of Guangdong. The area has served as a regional administrative center for nearly 2,000 years, and assumed its current boundaries in September 2005. The Guangdong provincial government and the Guangzhou city government are both located in the Yuexiu District. Yuexiu District has 18 subdistricts under its jurisdiction. The total area is 33.8 square kilometres (13.1 mi^{2}). According to the 2020 Chinese Census, the permanent population of Yuexiu District was 1,038,643.

== Toponymy ==
The name Yuexiu comes from Yuexiu Hill.

== History ==
However, according to archaeological discoveries, it has been confirmed that there were inhabitants settled in Guangzhou region at least three to four thousand years ago. The area of present-day Yuexiu District was once the capital of the Nanyue Kingdom. Thirty-three years after the incorporation of Lingnan into the Qin Empire, Qin Shi Huang forced most of the Yue tribes out of Guangzhou and assimilated the rest. In 111 BCE, the area was reorganized as Panyu County, within the Nanhai Commandery. The area of present-day Yuexiu District served as the capital of both.

The area would serve as the seat of government for numerous successive administrative divisions, including Lingnan Circuit and Xingwang Fu (Chinese: 兴王府). It would continue to form part of Panyu County until 1921, when the it merged with Nanhai County to create Yuexiu District, and placed under the jurisdiction of the city of Guangzhou.

=== People's Republic of China ===
The area came under the control of the People's Republic of China on October 14, 1949. In December 1949, Guangzhou was divided into 28 different districts, with the area of present-day Yuexiu District including Xishan District (西山区), Dexuan District (德宣区), Huifu District (惠福区), Jinghai District (靖海区), Xiaobei District (小北区), Taiping District (太平区), Yonghan District (永汉区), Dongshan District (东山区) Dadong District (大东区), and Qianjian District (前鉴区). In June 1950, Guangzhou consolidated its 28 districts into 16, resulting in the present-day area being including portions of Huifu District, Taiping District, Yonghan District, and Dadong District. In September 1952, Guangzhou reorganized its urban area into just 6 districts: East District, West District, North District, Central District, Henan District, and Zhujiang District. The former districts which once occupied present-day Yuexiu District were split between Central District, East District, and North District. In July 1960, North District underwent an enlargement, and was renamed to Yuexiu District, while East District was renamed to Dongshan District. In August 1961, five subdistricts from Yuexiu District were transferred to the jurisdiction of Dongshan District. Slight adjustments to the border of Yuexiu District and Dongshan District would continue throughout the 1990s.

In September 2005, Dongshan District was abolished and merged into Yuexiu District.

Beginning in the late 1990s and early 2000s, a number of sub-Saharan Africans began to move to Guangzhou, many of whom settled area of Xiaobei, within Yuexiu District. The area had already been inhabited by a number of Muslim internal migrants from Central and Northwest China since the 1980s. Local crackdowns on visa overstays have sporadically taken place since the early 2010s.

== Geography ==
Yuexiu District starts from Guangzhou Avenue in the east and borders Tianhe District; it faces the Pearl River in the south and faces Haizhu District across the river; it extends to Renmin Road in the west and is adjacent to Liwan District; it reaches the foot of Baiyun Mountain in the north and is adjacent to Baiyun District and Tianhe District. It is the old central city of Guangzhou. The total area of Yuexiu District is 33.8 square kilometers.

Around ten historic preservation districts have been designated in Yuexiu. A study of local residents found that natural landscapes, urban parks, and public spaces were among the most prominent features in their perception of the district.

== Administrative subdivisions ==
Yuexiu has administrative jurisdiction over 18 subdistricts (Chinese: 街道; pinyin: jiēdào), which then in turn administer 222 residential communities (社区; shèqū).

Name	Chinese (S)	Hanyu Pinyin	Canton Romanization	Population (2010)	Area (km^{2})
Baiyun Subdistrict	白云街道	Báiyún Jiēdào	bag6 wen4 gai1 dou6	46,768	3.08
Beijing Subdistrict	北京街道	Běijīng Jiēdào	beg1 ging1 gai1 dou6	53,135	0.51
Dadong Subdistrict	大东街道	Dàdōng Jiēdào	dai6 dung1 gai1 dou6	83,491	1.02
Datang Subdistrict	大塘街道	Dàtáng Jiēdào	dai6 tong4 gai1 dou6	46,124	1.06
Dengfeng Subdistrict	登峰街道	Dēngfēng Jiēdào	deng1 fung1 gai1 dou6	92,218	4.98
Dongshan Subdistrict	东山街道	Dōngshān Jiēdào	dung1 san1 gai1 dou6	74,299	2.30
Guangta Subdistrict	光塔街道	Guāngtǎ Jiēdào	guong1 tab3 gai1 dou6	68,128	0.44
Hongqiao Subdistrict	洪桥街道	Hóngqiáo Jiēdào	hung4 kiu4 gai1 dou6	42,258	1.52
Huale Subdistrict	华乐街道	Huálè Jiēdào	wa4 log6 gai1 dou6	47,126	1.28
Huanghuagang Subdistrict	黄花岗街道	Huánghuāgāng Jiēdào	wong4 fa1 gong1 gai1 dou6	99,569	4.43
Jianshe Subdistrict	建设街道	Jiànshè Jiēdào	gin3 qid3 gai1 dou6	52,110	0.93
Kuangquan Subdistrict	矿泉街道	Kuàngquán Jiēdào	kong3 qun4 gai1 dou6	90,036	3.01
Liuhua Subdistrict	流花街道	Liúhuā Jiēdào	leo4 fa1 gai1 dou6	17,253	1.81
Liurong Subdistrict	六榕街道	Liùróng Jiēdào	lug6 yung4 gai1 dou6	83,996	0.87
Meihuacun Subdistrict	梅花村街道	Méihuācūn Jiēdào	mui4 fa1 qun1 gai1 dou6	85,400	1.73
Nonglin Subdistrict	农林街道	Nónglín Jiēdào	nung4 lem4 gai1 dou6	50,152	1.08
Renmin Subdistrict	人民街道	Rénmín Jiēdào	yen4 men4 gai1 dou6	69,274	1.51
Zhuguang Subdistrict	珠光街道	Zhūguāng Jiēdào	ju1 guong1 gai1 dou6	56,329	0.93

- On 15 March 2013 Dongfeng Subdistrict merged into Liurong Subdistrict, Shishu Subdistrict merged into Guangta Subdistrict, Daxin Subdistrict merged into Renmin Subdistrict, and Guangwei Subdistrict merged into Beijing Subdistrict.

== Government ==
The Guangdong Department of Education is headquartered in Yuexiu District.

== Demographics ==
The area of Xiaobei, within the district, has been a significant Muslim community in the area for decades. Xiaobei, which has been nicknamed "Little Africa" and "Chocolate City" due to the number of Sub-Saharan Africans who live and work in the area, hosts a diverse population of Muslims from Central and Northwest China, Sub-Saharan Africa, the Middle East, North Africa, and the Indian subcontinent.

== Economy ==
As of 2023, Yuexiu District has a gross domestic product of 381.024 billion renminbi.

Creative Power Entertaining is headquartered in the Wuzi Building (Note: 物资大厦; 物資大廈; Wùzī Dàshà; mat6 zi1 daai6 haa6) in the Yuexiu District.

The Mainland China offices of Dairy Farm Group are located at the Guangdong Mechanical Sub-Building (Note: 广东机械大厦; 廣東機械大廈; Guǎngdōng Jīxiè Dàshà; gwong2 dung1 gei1 haai6 daai6 haa6) in the district.

== Culture ==
Due to the notable Muslim population within the Xiaobei neighborhood, the area has attracted a cluster of Halal butchers, restaurants, and various stores.

== Transportation ==
=== Metro ===
Yuexiu is currently serviced by seven metro lines operated by the Guangzhou Metro:

- Line 1 - Tiyu Xilu, Yangji ( 5 ), Dongshankou ( 6 ), Martyrs' Park, Peasant Movement Institute, Gongyuanqian ( 2 ), Ximenkou, Xilang
- Line 2 - Guangzhou Station ( 5 ), Yuexiu Park, Sun Yat-sen Memorial Hall, Gongyuanqian ( 1 ), Haizhu Square ( 6 )
- Line 5 - Guangzhou Railway Station ( 2 ), Xiaobei, Taojin, Ouzhuang ( 6 ), Zoo, Yangji ( 1 ), Wuyangcun ( 10 )
- Line 6 - Yide Lu, Haizhu Square ( 2 ), Beijing Lu, Tuanyida Square, Donghu ( 10 ), Dongshankou ( 1 ), Ouzhuang ( 5 ), Huanghuagang
- Line 10 - Donghu ( 6 ), Wuyangcun ( 5 )
- Line 11 - Liuhua, Yuntai Garden
- Line 12 - Ersha Island

== Education ==
The American International School of Guangzhou elementary school campus is on Ersha Island in the district.

Previously the École Française Internationale de Canton, the French international school of Guangzhou, was located at the GoldArch Riverdale (Note: 金亚花园; 金亞花園; Jīnyà Huāyuán; gam1 aa3 faa1 jyun4*2) development on Ersha Island.

== See also ==
- Africans in Guangzhou
