= Ximenkou station (Guangzhou Metro) =

Guangzhou Metro station

Coordinates: 23.1252°N 113.2556°E

Ximenkou 西门口
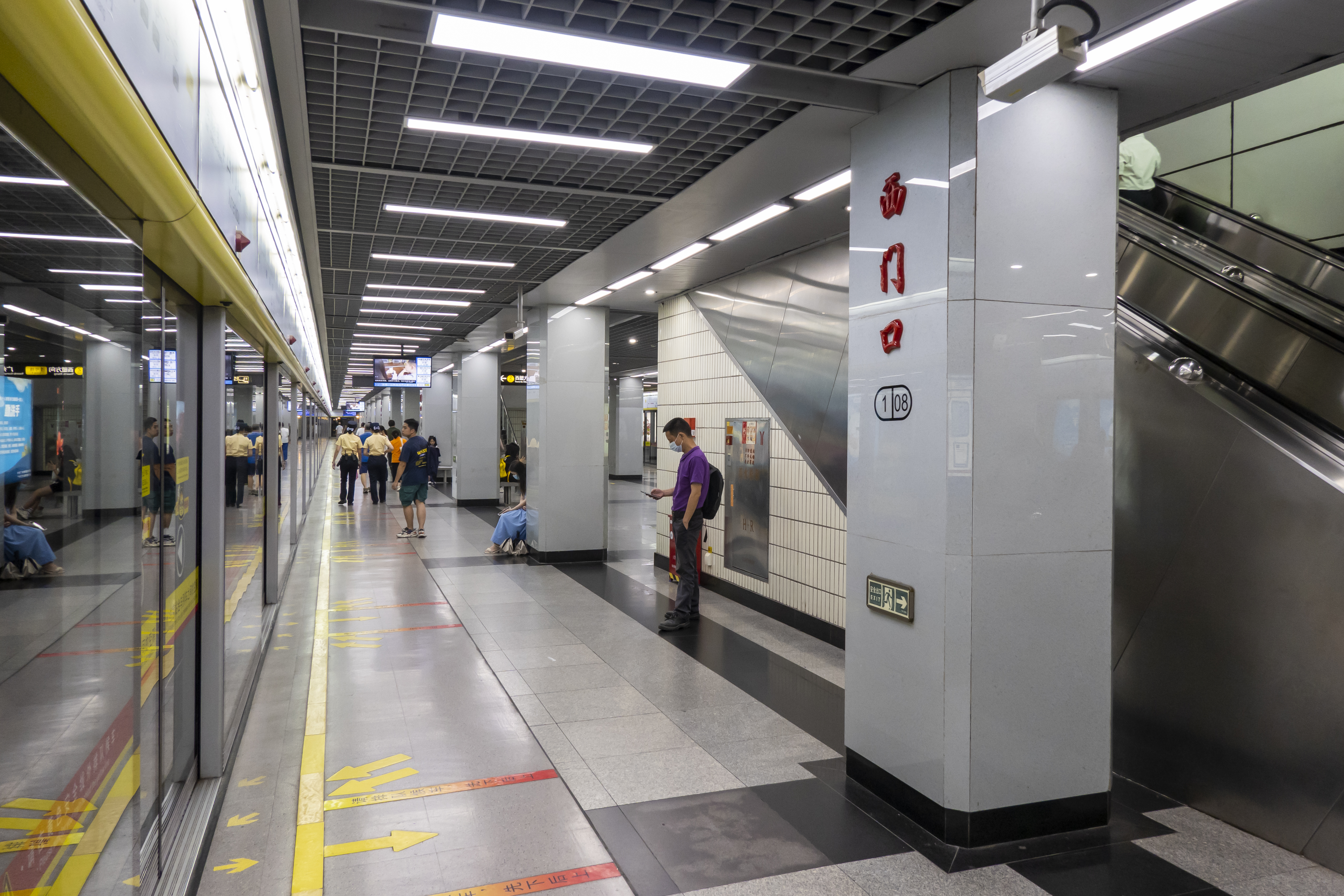

Chinese name
- Simplified Chinese: 西门口站
- Traditional Chinese: 西門口站
- Literal meaning: west gate
Transcriptions
Standard Mandarin
- Hanyu Pinyin: Xīménkǒu Zhàn
Yue: Cantonese
- Jyutping: sai^{1}mun^{4}hau^{2} zaam^{6}
- Hong Kong Romanization: Sai Mun Hau station

General information
- Location: Yuexiu District, Guangzhou, Guangdong; China
- Operated by: Guangzhou Metro Co. Ltd.
- Line: Line 1
- Platforms: 2 (1 island platform)

Construction
- Structure type: Underground

Other information
- Station code: 108

History
- Opened: June 28, 1999; 26 years ago

Services
Preceding station	Guangzhou Metro	Following station
Chen Clan Academy towards Xilang	Line 1	Gongyuanqian towards Guangzhou East Railway Station
Location

Ximenkou Station (simplified Chinese: 西门口站; traditional Chinese: 西門口站; Jyutping: sai1 mun4 hau2 zaam6; Cantonese Yale: Sāimùhnháu Jaahm; lit. 'West Gate Station') is a station on Line 1 of the Guangzhou Metro that started operations on 28 June 1999. It is situated under Zhongshan 6th Road (Chinese: 中山六路) in the Yuexiu District of Guangzhou City, Guangdong Province, southern China.

== Station layout ==
G	-	Exit
L1; Concourse	Lobby	Customer Service, Shops, Vending machines, ATMs
L2; Platforms	Platform 2	1 towards Xilang (Chen Clan Academy)
L2; Platforms	Island platform, doors will open on the left
L2; Platforms	Platform 1	1 towards Guangzhou East Railway Station (Gongyuanqian)

== Exits ==
Exit number	Exit location
Exit A	Zhongshan 6th Road (中山六路)
Exit B	Zhongshan 6th Road (中山六路)
Exit C	North Renmin Road (人民北路)
Exit D	Zhongshan 7th Road (中山七路)

== Around the station ==
- Guangxiao Temple
- Huaisheng Mosque
- Temple of the Six Banyan Trees
