= Huangsha station =

Guangzhou Metro interchange station

Coordinates: 23.1106°N 113.24086°E

Huangsha 黄沙
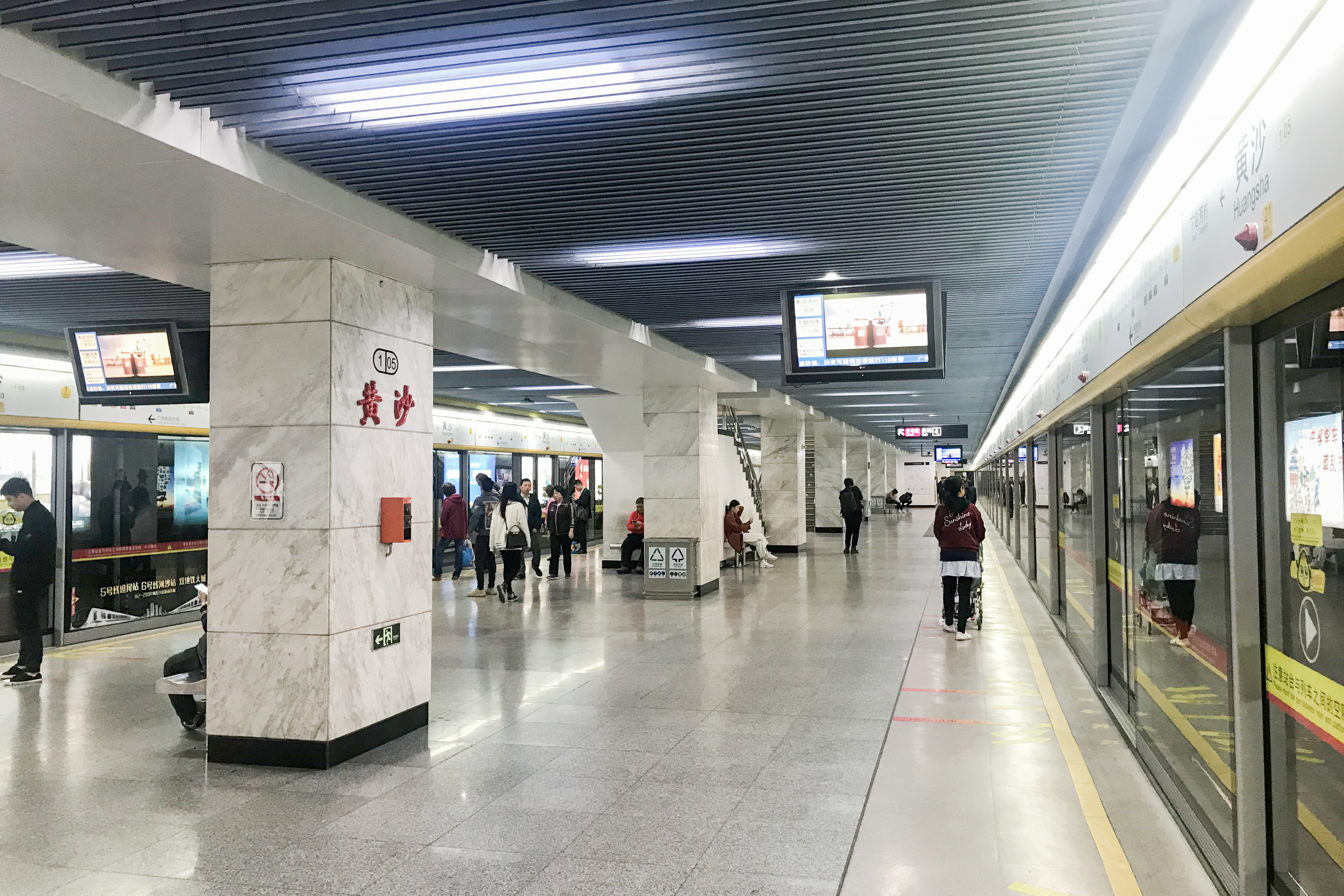
- Line 1 platform

Chinese name
- Simplified Chinese: 黄沙站
- Traditional Chinese: 黃沙站
- Literal meaning: yellow sands
Transcriptions
Standard Mandarin
- Hanyu Pinyin: Huángshā Zhàn
Yue: Cantonese
- Jyutping: wong^{2}saa^{1} zaam^{6}
- Hong Kong Romanization: Wong Sha station

General information
- Location: Liu'ersan Road (六二三路) and Datong Road (大同路); Liwan District, Guangzhou, Guangdong; China
- Operated by: Guangzhou Metro Co. Ltd.
- Lines: Line 1; Line 6
- Platforms: 4 (2 island platforms)
- Tracks: 4

Construction
- Structure type: Underground
- Accessible: Yes

Other information
- Station code: 105 607

History
- Opened: 28 June 1997; 28 years ago (Line 1); 28 December 2013; 12 years ago (Line 6)

Services
Preceding station	Guangzhou Metro	Following station
Fangcun towards Xilang	Line 1	Changshou Lu towards Guangzhou East Railway Station
Ruyifang towards Xunfenggang	Line 6	Cultural Park towards Xiangxue
Location

Huangsha station (simplified Chinese: 黄沙站; traditional Chinese: 黃沙站; Jyutping: wong^{2} saa^{1} zaam^{6}; Cantonese Yale: Wóngsā Jaahm; lit. 'Yellow Sands station') is an interchange station between Line 1 and Line 6 of the Guangzhou Metro, and was the first Line 1 station to have platform screen doors installed. Line 1 started operations on 28 June 1997. Line 6 started operations on 28 December 2013. It was the terminus of Line 1 when the Guangzhou Metro started the service in 1997. It is situated under the junction of Datong Road (Chinese: 大同路) and Liu'ersan Road (六二三路) in the Liwan District of Guangzhou. It is near Shamian Island, where the White Swan Hotel and many Western style buildings are. It became an interchange station between Line 1 and Line 6 in 2013.

== Station layout ==
G	-	Exits B–F
B1; Concourse	Line 1 Lobby	Ticket Machines, Customer Service, Police Station, Safety Facilities, Exit to Metropolitan Plaza
B1; Concourse	Transfer Passageway	Transfer passageway between Lines 1 & 6
B1; Concourse	Line 6 Lobby	Ticket Machines, Customer Service, Police Station, Safety Facilities, Toilet
B2; Platforms	Platform 2	1 towards Xilang (Fangcun)
B2; Platforms	Island platform, doors will open on the left
B2; Platforms	Platform 1	1 towards Guangzhou East Railway Station (Changshou Lu)
B2; Platforms	Equipment Area	Station Equipment
B3; Equipment Area	-	Station Equipment
B3; Equipment Area	Buffer Area	Buffer area of Line 6
B4; Platforms	Platform 4	6 towards Xunfenggang (Ruyifang)
B4; Platforms	Island platform, doors will open on the left
B4; Platforms	Platform 3	6 towards Xiangxue (Cultural Park)

== Gallery ==
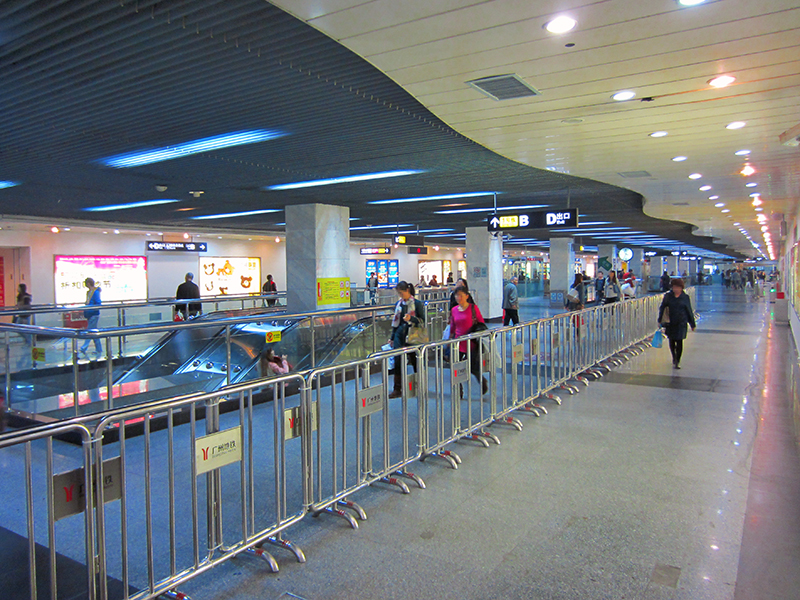
Line 1 concourse

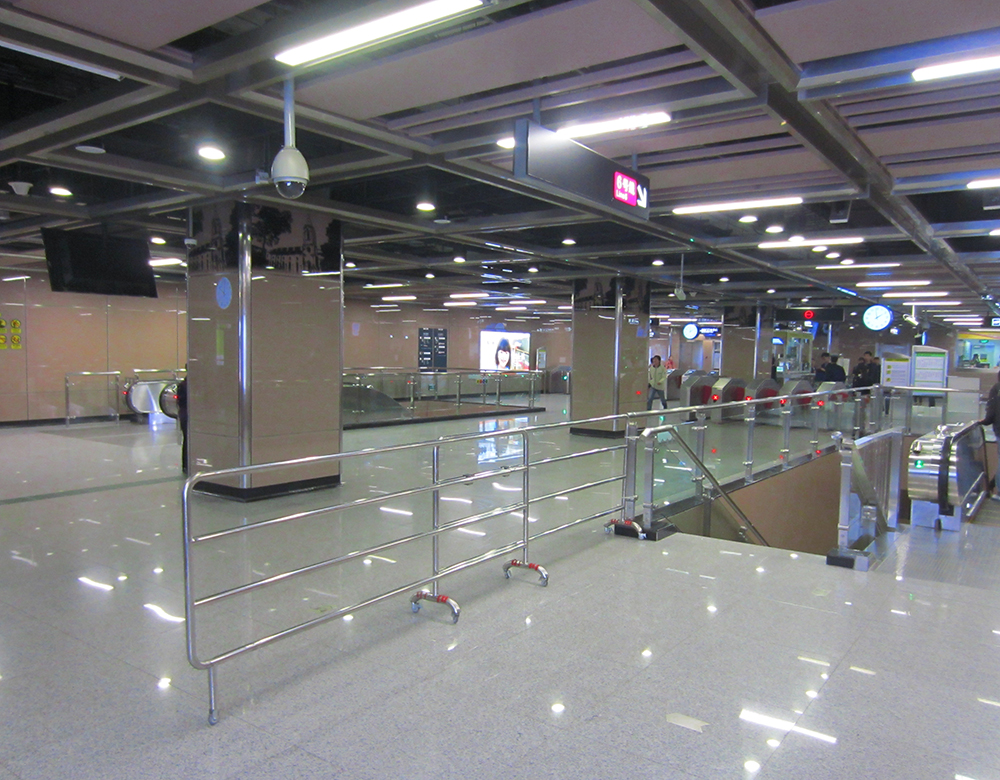
Line 6 concourse

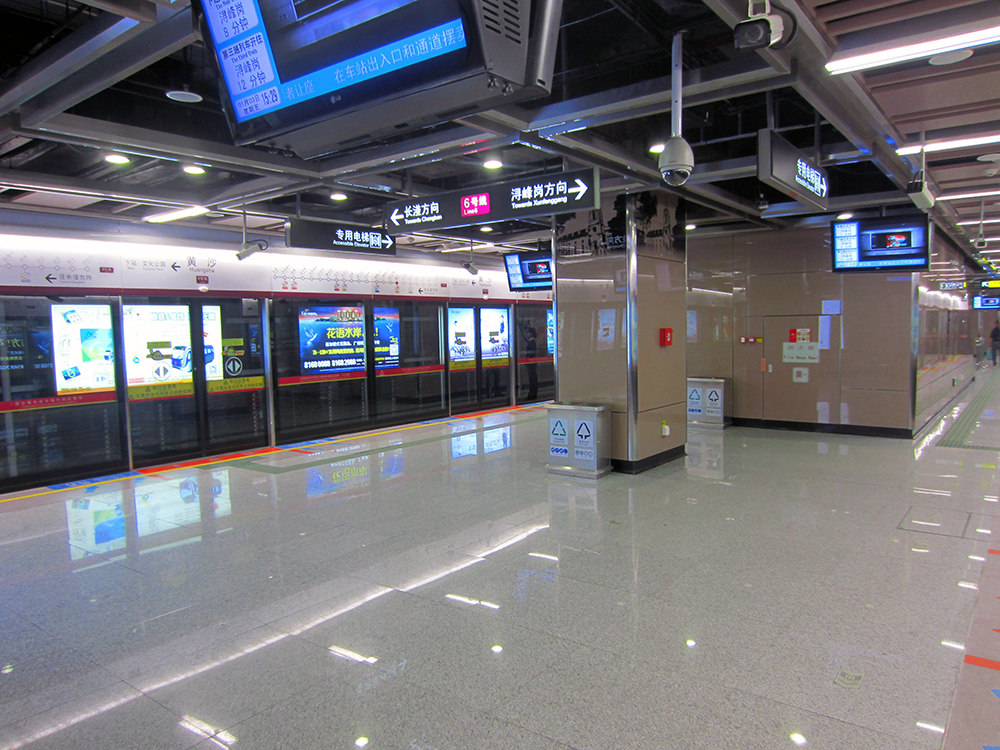
Line 6 platform

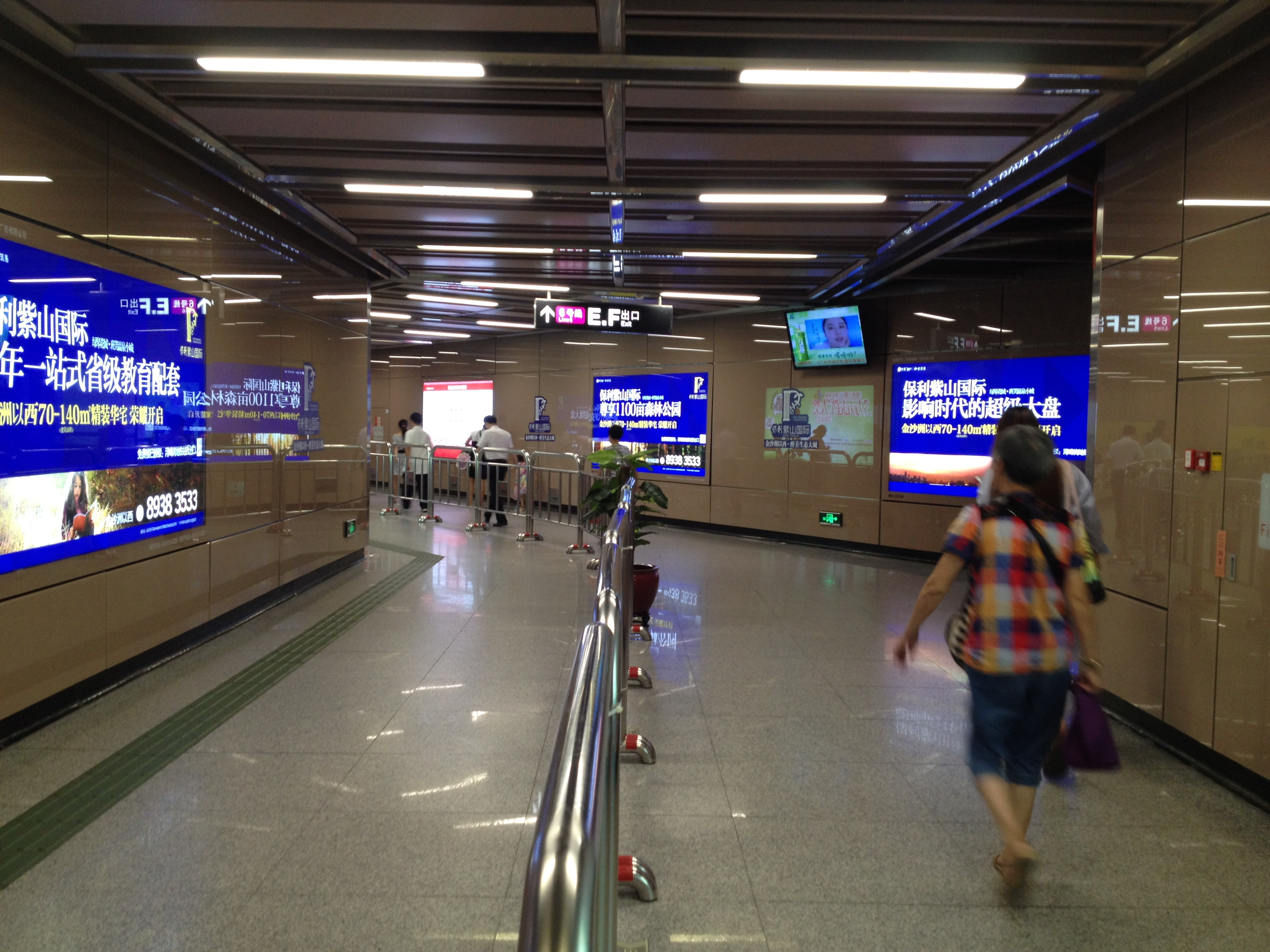
Transfer corridor

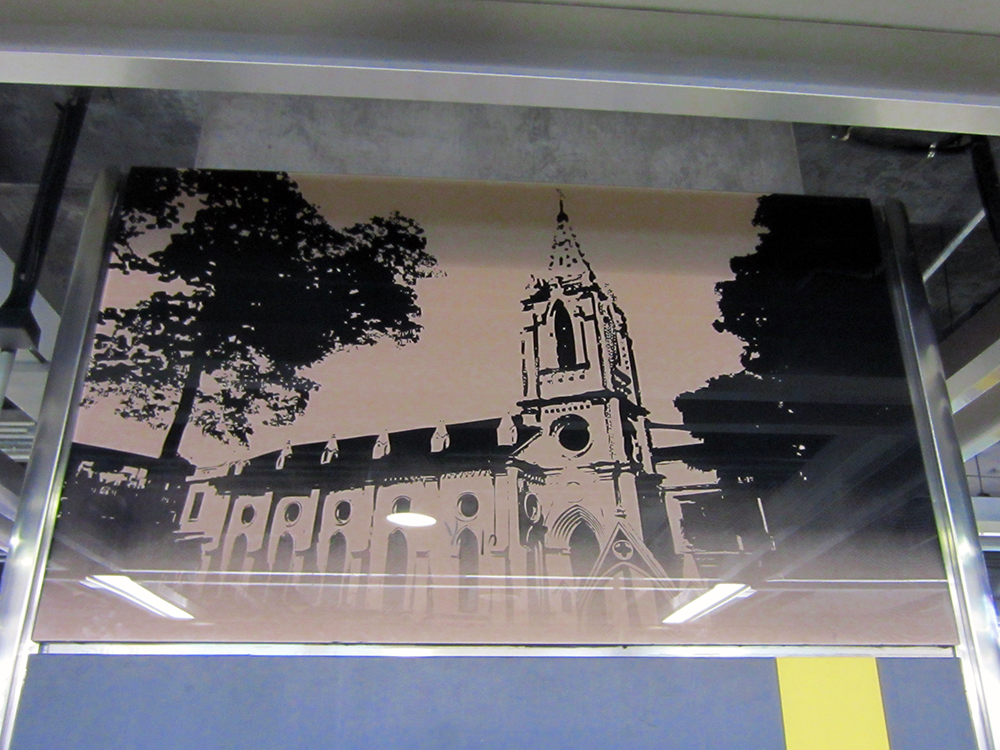
Line 6 platform wall decoration
