= Chen Clan Academy station =

Guangzhou Metro station

Chen Clan Academy 陈家祠
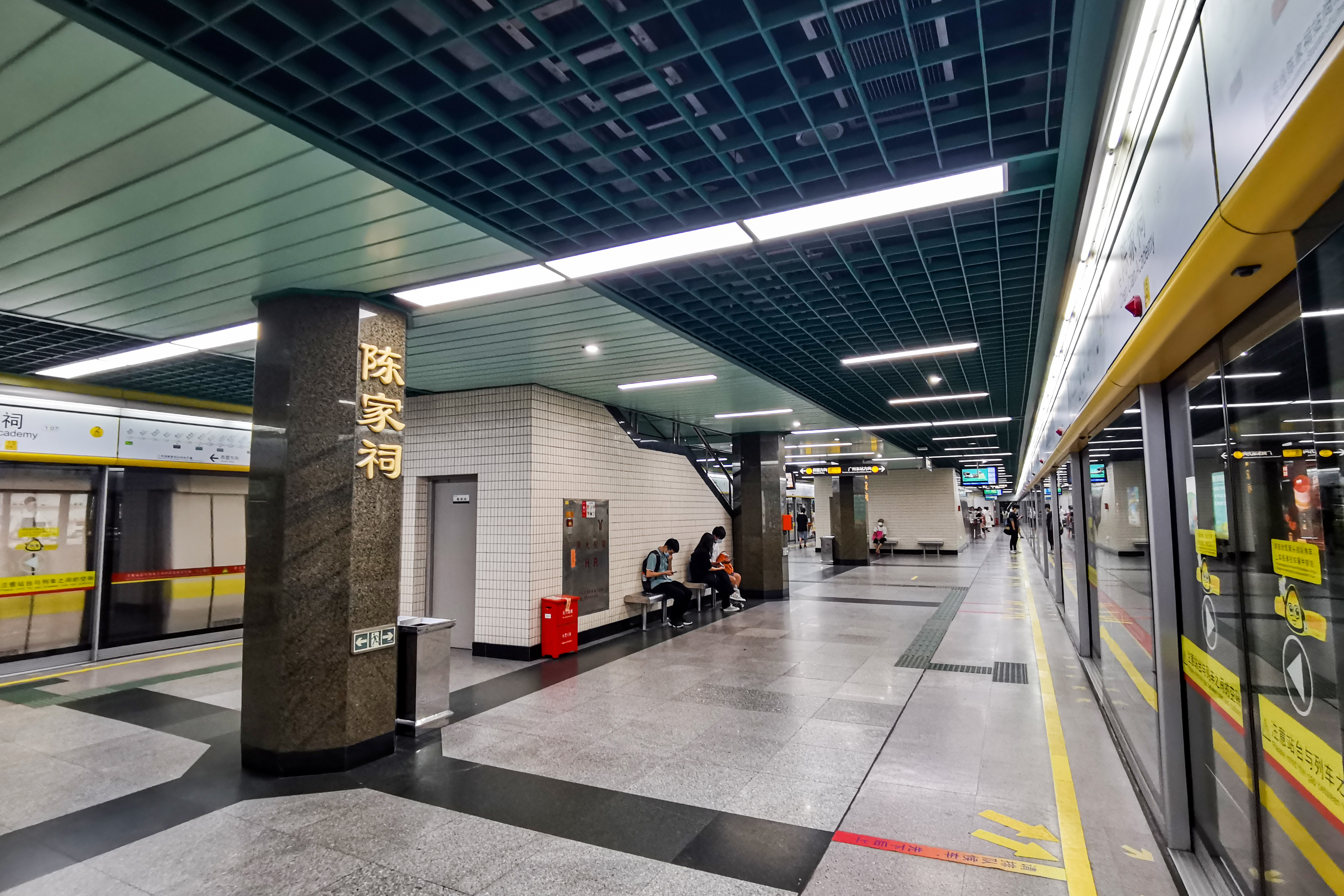
- Line 1 platform

Chinese name
- Simplified Chinese: 陈家祠站
- Traditional Chinese: 陳家祠站
Transcriptions
Standard Mandarin
- Hanyu Pinyin: Chénjiācí Zhàn
Yue: Cantonese
- Jyutping: Can^{4}gaa^{1}ci^{4} Zaam^{6}

General information
- Location: Liwan District, Guangzhou, Guangdong; China
- Coordinates: 23.12550°N 113.24659°E
- Operated by: Guangzhou Metro Co. Ltd.
- Lines: Line 1; Line 8
- Platforms: 4 (2 island platforms)
- Tracks: 4

Construction
- Structure type: Underground
- Accessible: Yes

Other information
- Station code: 107 812

History
- Opened: 28 June 1999; 26 years ago (Line 1); 26 November 2020; 5 years ago (Line 8)

Services
Preceding station	Guangzhou Metro	Following station
Changshou Lu towards Xilang	Line 1	Ximenkou towards Guangzhou East Railway Station
Caihong Bridge towards Jiaoxin	Line 8	Hualinsi Buddhist Temple towards Wanshengwei
Location

Chen Clan Academy Station (simplified Chinese: 陈家祠站; traditional Chinese: 陳家祠站; Jyutping: Can^{4}gaa^{1}ci^{4} Zaam^{6}; Cantonese Yale: Chàhngāchìh Jaahm) is an interchange station between Line 1 and Line 8 of the Guangzhou Metro. It started operations on 28 June 1999 and is situated underground Zhongshan 7th Road (Chinese: 中山七路) in the Liwan District. The station was named after the nearby Chen Clan Academy, an academy constructed by the Chen family for their juniors' accommodation and study in Guangzhou during the Qing Dynasty (1644–1911).

== Station layout ==
G	Street level	Exits A-G
L1; Concourse	Lobby	Ticket Machines, Customer Service, Shops, Police Station, Safety Facilities
L2; Platforms	Platform 2	1 towards Xilang (Changshou Lu)
L2; Platforms	Island platform, doors will open on the left
L2; Platforms	Platform 1	→ 1 towards Guangzhou East Railway Station (Ximenkou)
L3; Platforms	Platform 3	8 towards Jiaoxin (Caihongqiao)
L3; Platforms	Island platform, doors will open on the left
L3; Platforms	Platform 4	8 towards Wanshengwei (Hualinsi Buddhist Temple)

== Gallery ==
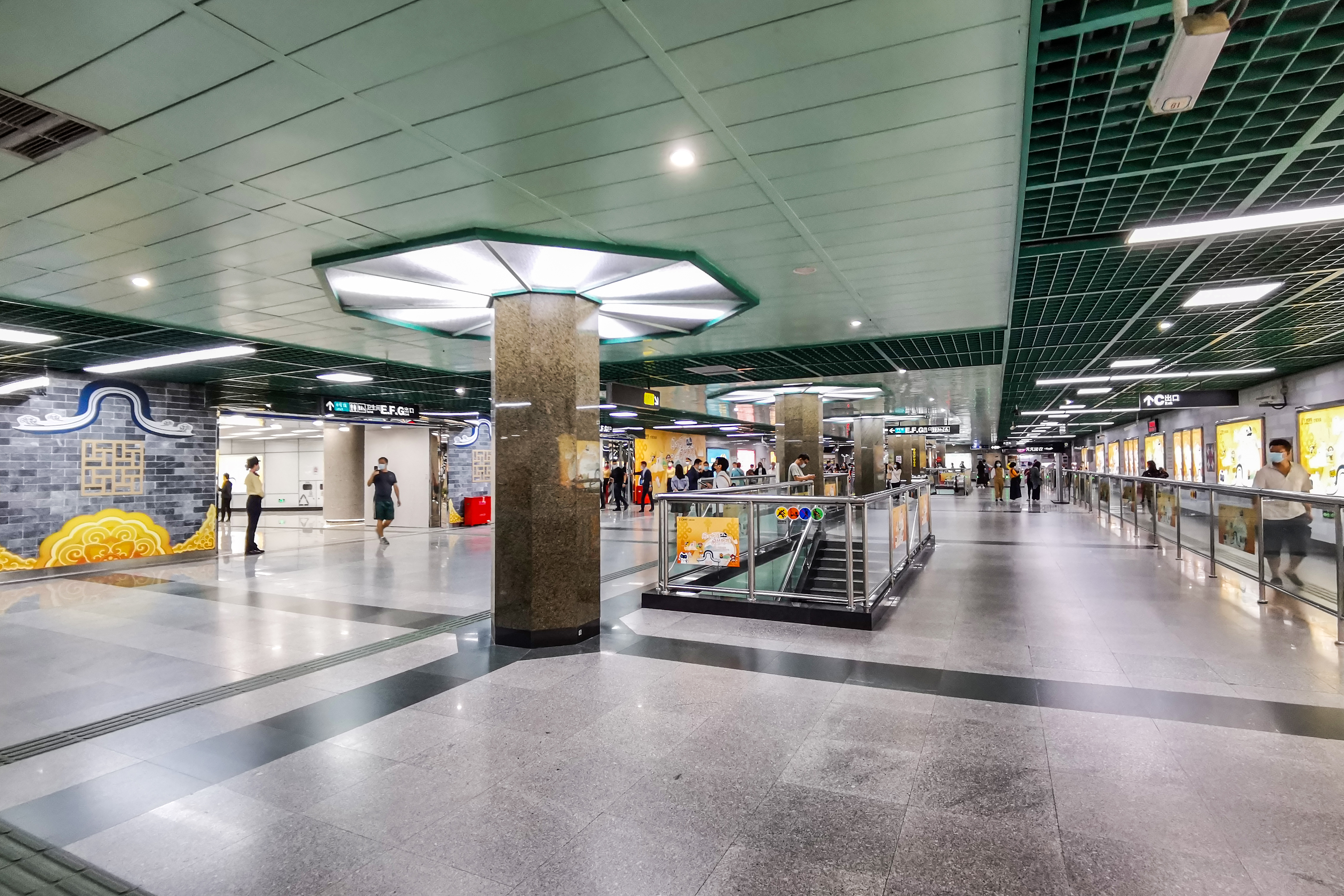
Line 1 concourse

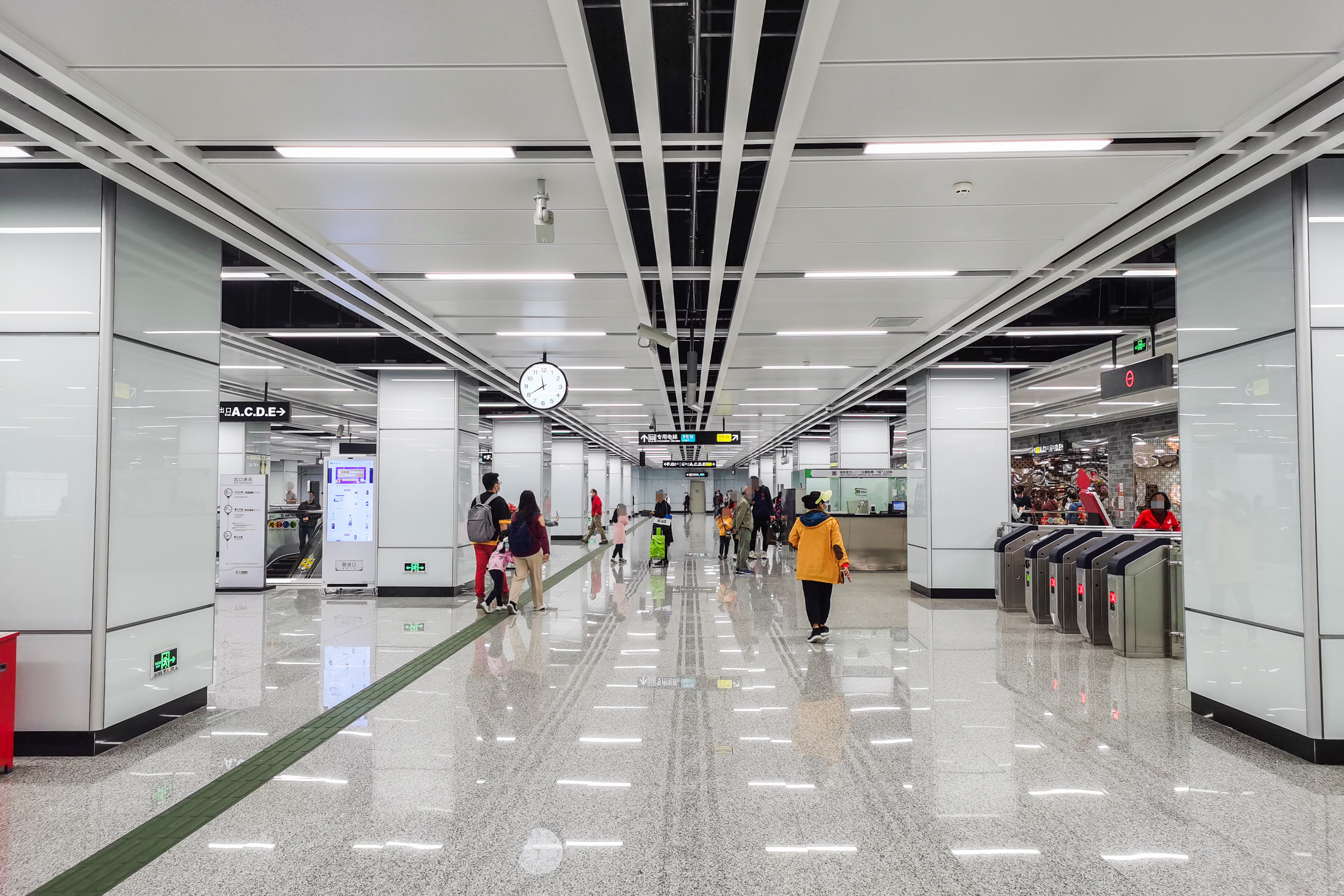
Line 8 concourse

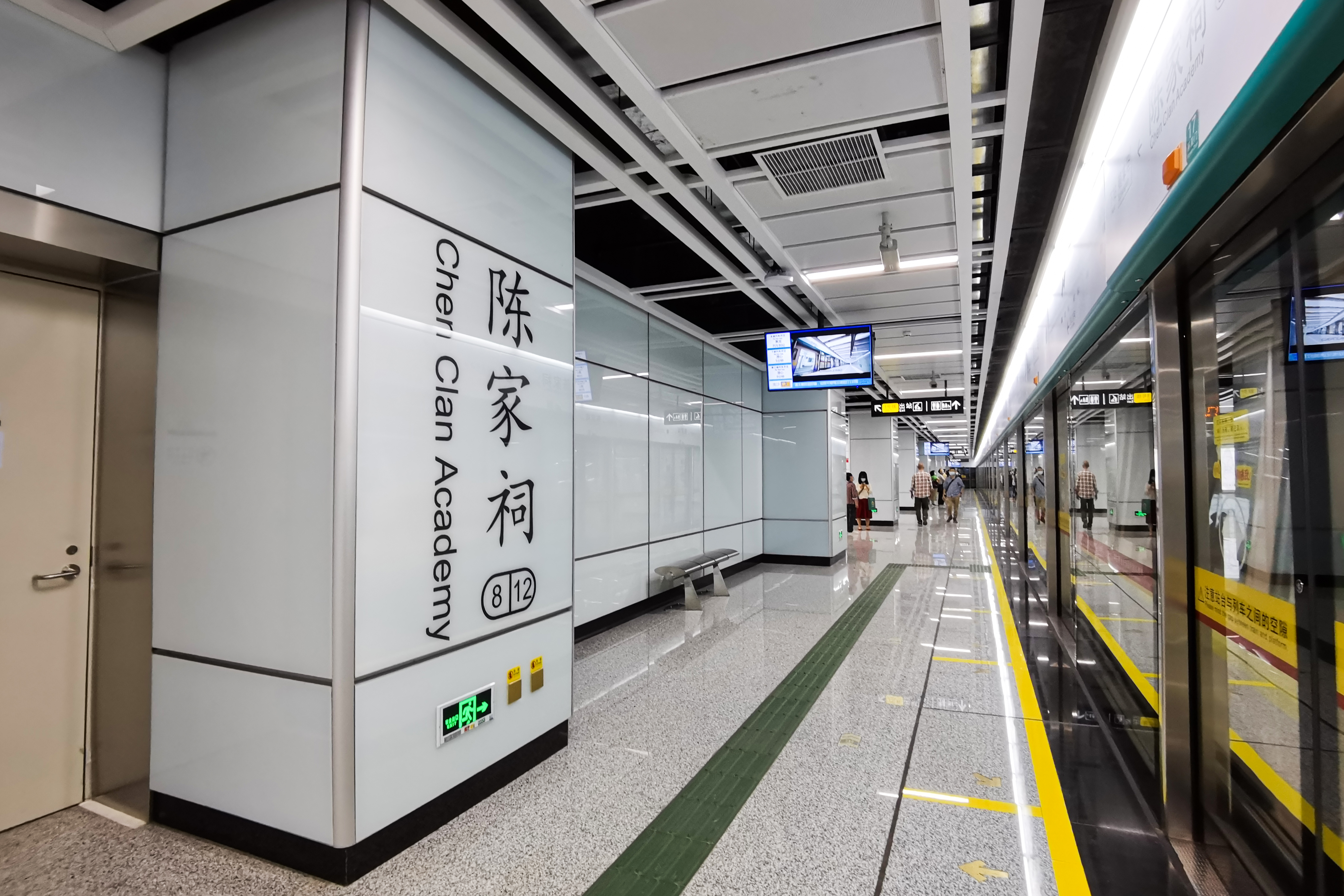
Line 8 platform

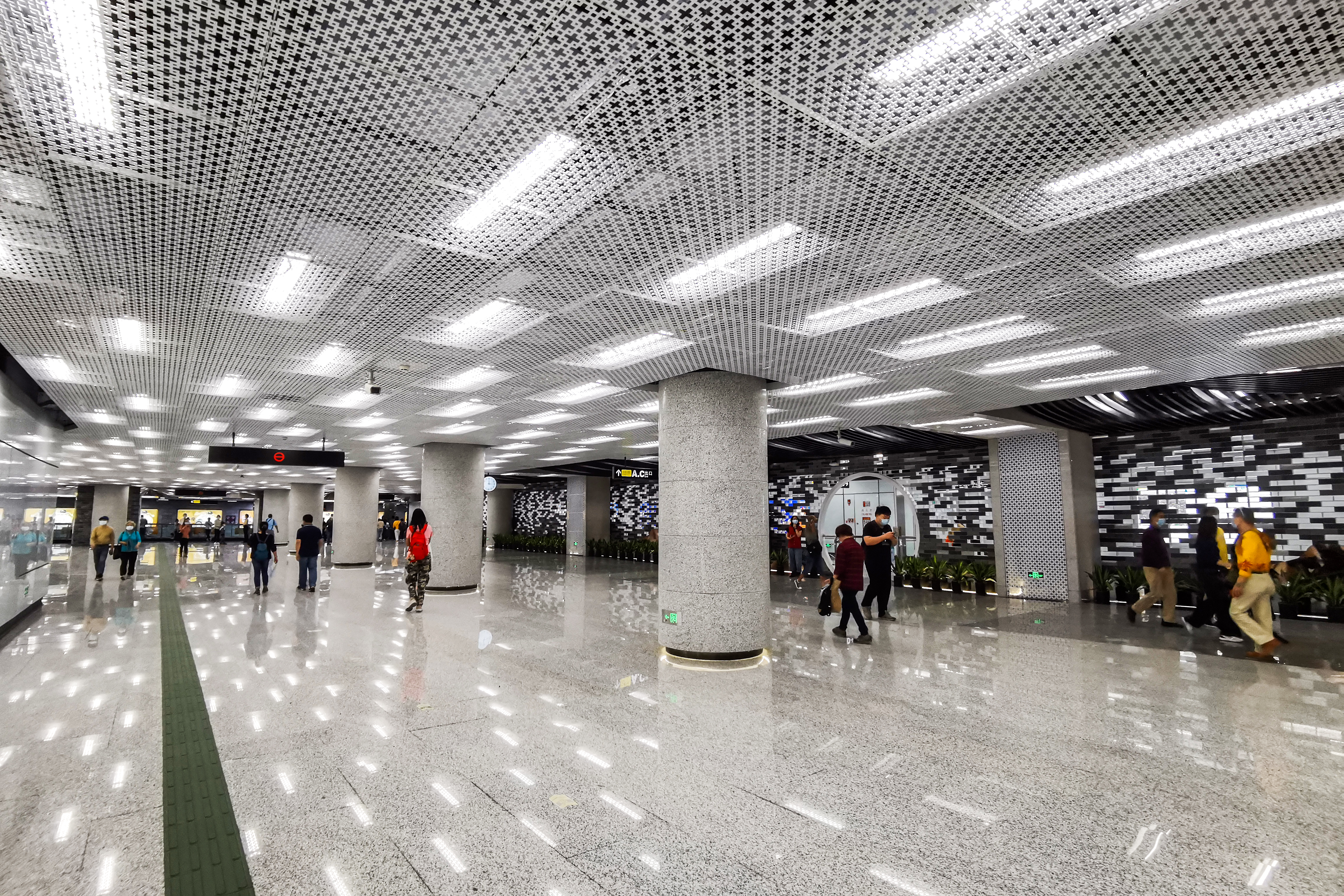
Transfer corridor
