= Changshou Lu station =

Guangzhou Metro station

Coordinates: 23.11792°N 113.24221°E

Changshou Lu 长寿路
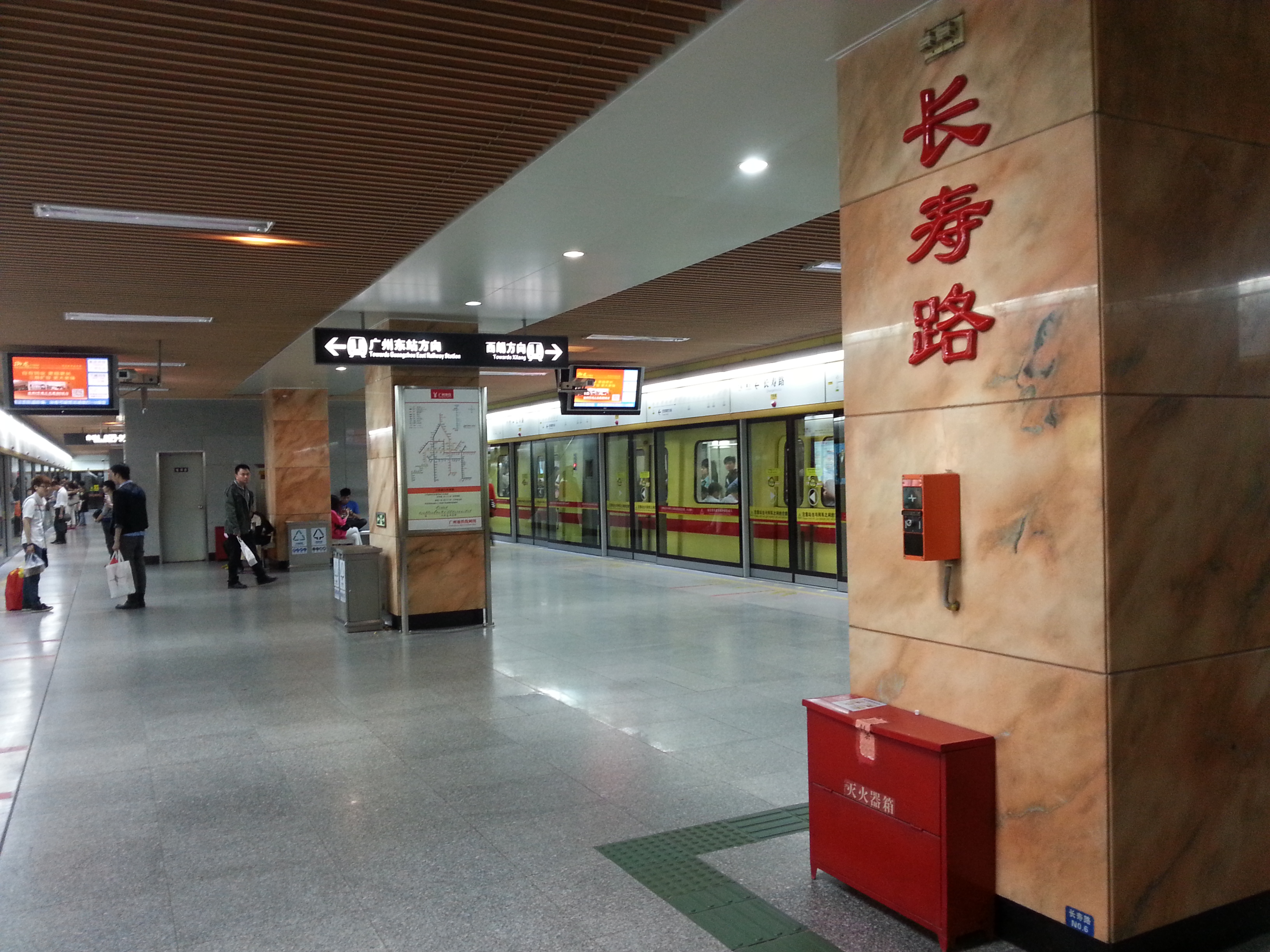

Chinese name
- Simplified Chinese: 长寿路站
- Traditional Chinese: 長壽路站
- Literal meaning: Changshou (Longevity) Road Station
Transcriptions
Standard Mandarin
- Hanyu Pinyin: Chángshòu Lù Zhàn
Yue: Cantonese
- Jyutping: coeng^{4}sau^{6}lou^{6} zaam^{6}
- Hong Kong Romanization: Cheung Sau Road station

General information
- Location: Changshou Road West (长寿西路) and Baohua Road (宝华路); Liwan District, Guangzhou, Guangdong; China
- Operated by: Guangzhou Metro Co. Ltd.
- Line: Line 1
- Platforms: 2 (1 island platform)

Construction
- Structure type: Underground

Other information
- Station code: 106

History
- Opened: June 28, 1999; 26 years ago

Services
Preceding station	Guangzhou Metro	Following station
Huangsha towards Xilang	Line 1	Chen Clan Academy towards Guangzhou East Railway Station
Location

Changshou Lu station (simplified Chinese: 长寿路站; traditional Chinese: 長壽路站; Jyutping: coeng4 sau6 lou6 zaam6; Cantonese Yale: Chèuhngsauh Louh Jaahm; lit. 'Longevity Road Station') is a station on Line 1 of the Guangzhou Metro that began operations on June 28, 1999. It is situated underground at the junction of Changshou Road West (Chinese: 长寿西路) and Baohua Road (宝华路) in Guangzhou's Liwan District, near the Shangxiajiu shopping area.

== Station layout ==
G	Street level	Exits (3)
B1; Concourse	Lobby	Customer Service, Shops, Vending machines, ATMs
B2; Platforms	Platform 2	1 towards Xilang (Huangsha)
B2; Platforms	Island platform, doors will open on the left
B2; Platforms	Platform 1	→ 1 towards Guangzhou East Railway Station (Chen Clan Academy)
