= Hualinsi Buddhist Temple station =

Metro station in Guangzhou, China

Hualinsi Buddhist Temple 华林寺
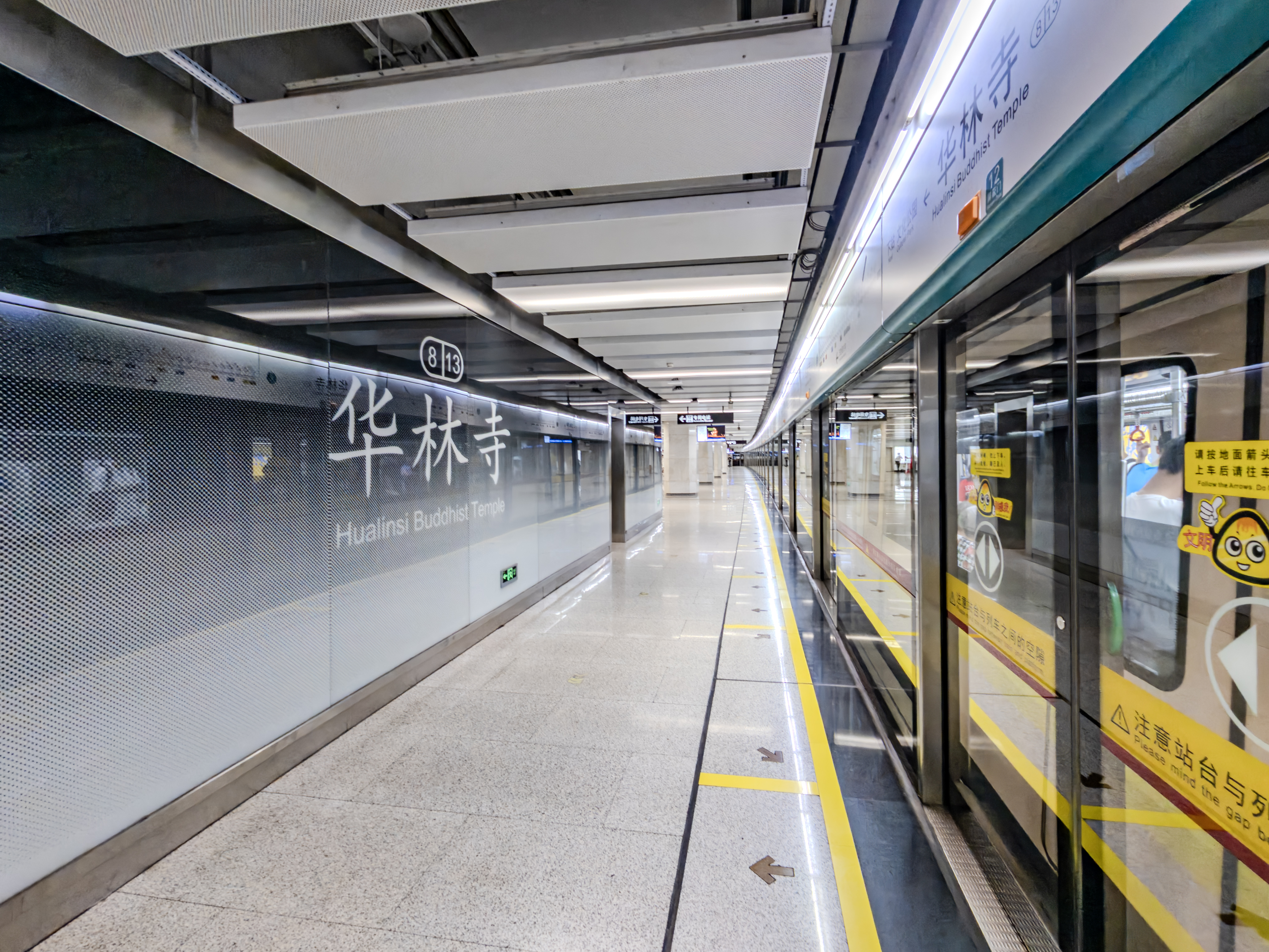
- Platform 2 (southbound platform)

Chinese name
- Simplified Chinese: 华林寺站
- Traditional Chinese: 華林寺站
Transcriptions
Standard Mandarin
- Hanyu Pinyin: Huálínsì Zhàn

General information
- Location: Middle Kangwang Road, Changshou West Road, Liwan District, Guangzhou, Guangdong; China
- Coordinates: 23.1206778°N 113.2117139°E
- Operated by: Guangzhou Metro Co. Ltd.
- Line: Line 8
- Platforms: 2 (1 island platform)
- Tracks: 2

Construction
- Structure type: Underground
- Accessible: Yes

Other information
- Station code: 813

History
- Opened: 26 November 2020; 5 years ago

Services
Preceding station	Guangzhou Metro	Following station
Chen Clan Academy towards Jiaoxin	Line 8	Cultural Park towards Wanshengwei
Location

Hualinsi Buddhist Temple Station (simplified Chinese: 华林寺站; traditional Chinese: 華林寺站; pinyin: Huálínsì Zhàn) is a station of Guangzhou Metro Line 8, located underground on the intersection of Middle Kangwang Road, Changshou West Road, Liwan District, Guangzhou, Guangdong Province, China. The station was opened on November 26, 2020, with the opening of the northern extension of Guangzhou Metro Line 8.

== Station layout ==
The station has an underground island platform. Platform 1 is for trains towards Jiaoxin, whilst platform 2 is for trains towards Wanshengwei.

In order not to affect the ground traffic of Middle Kangwang Road as much as possible during the construction of this station, and to avoid the Kangwang Road tunnel south of the station, the platform was constructed using a combination of cut and cover excavation, and the width of the central open cut part was 26 meters wide, the most spacious platform in Guangzhou Metro. In addition, the two main tracks of Line 8 need to match the direction of Kangwang Road, so both platforms 1 and 2 are curved.

G	-	Exits B, C1, C2, D, E
L1; Concourse	Lobby	Customer Service, Shops, Vending machines, ATMs
L2; Equipment Area	-	Station equipment
L3; Equipment Area	-	Station equipment
L4; Platforms
L4; Platforms	Platform 1	8 towards Jiaoxin (Chen Clan Academy)
L4; Platforms	Island platform, doors will open on the left
L4; Platforms	Platform 2	8 towards Wanshengwei (Cultural Park)

== Exits ==
There are 5 exits, lettered B, C1, C2, D, and E. Exit C2 is accessible. Exit B is located on Changshou East Road, exit C1 is located on Middle Kangwang Road, exits C2 and D are located on Changshou West Road, and exit E is located on Xiajiu Road.

== Gallery ==
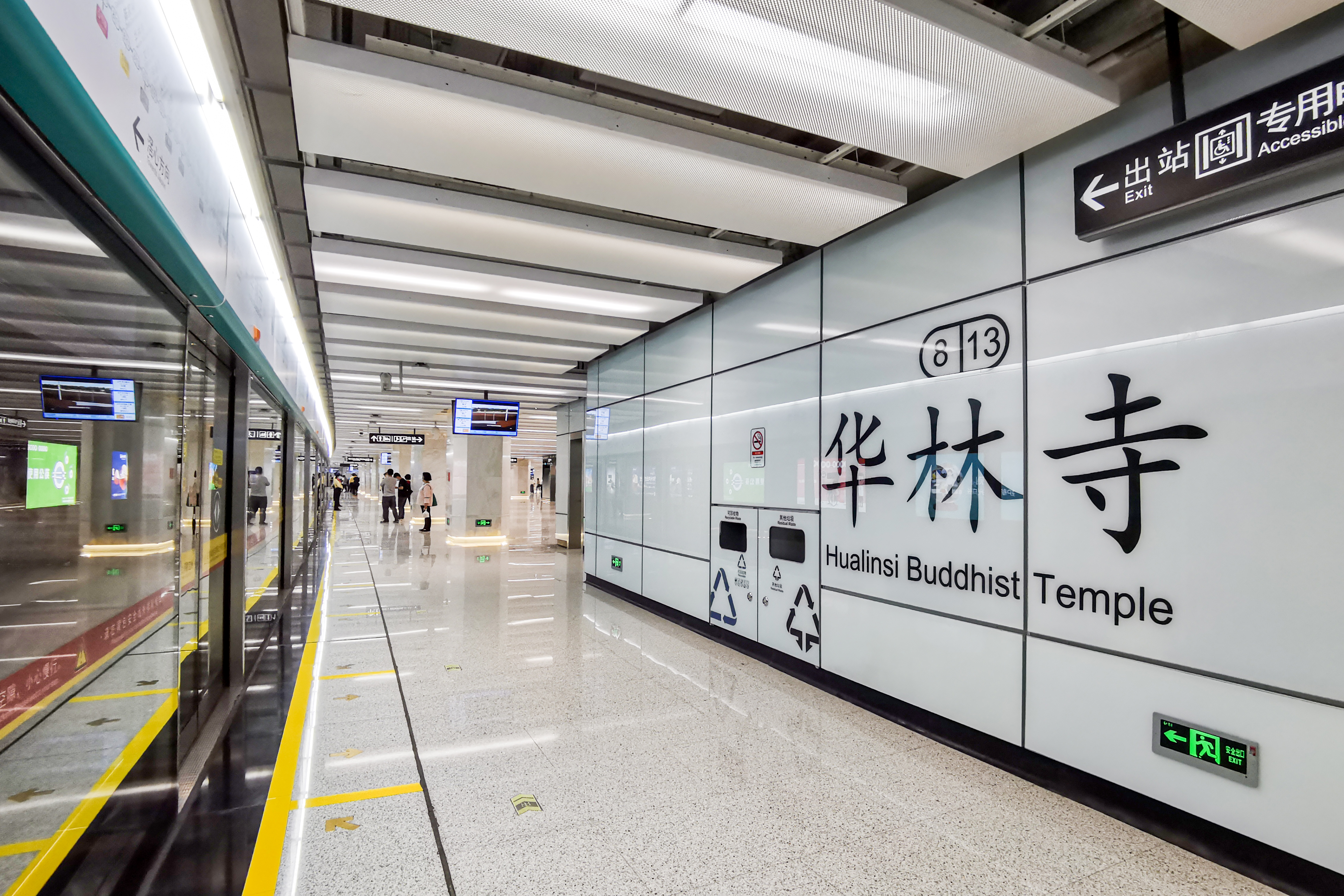
Platform 1

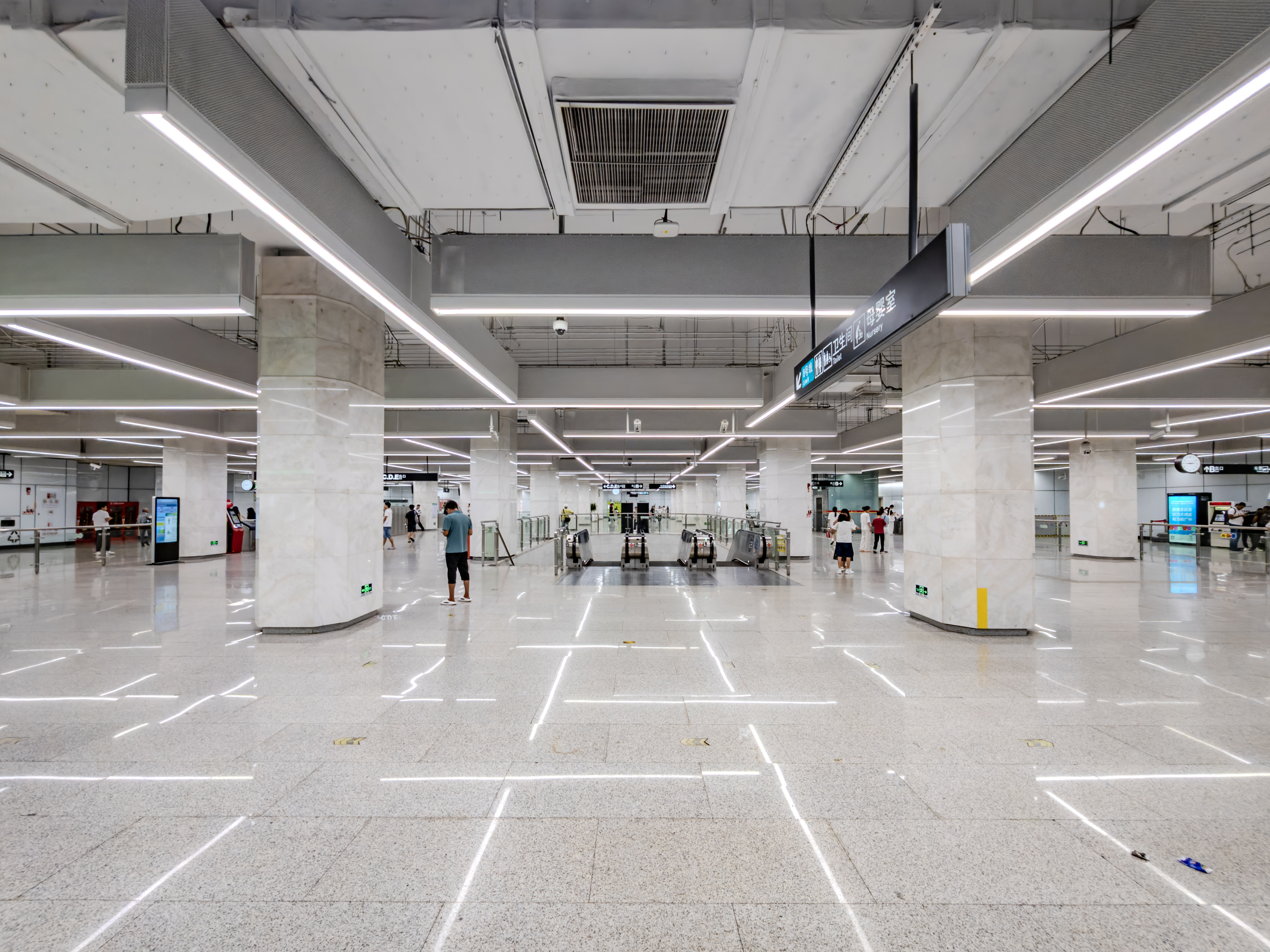
Concourse
