= Line 1 (Guangzhou Metro) =

Line of the Guangzhou Metro

- A Line 1 train in 2023

Overview
- Other name(s): M1 ("十" shape plan name); Zhongshanlu line (中山路线)
- Status: Operational
- Owner: City of Guangzhou
- Locale: Tianhe, Yuexiu, and Liwan districts Guangzhou, Guangdong
- Termini: Guangzhou East Railway Station; Xilang
- Stations: 16
- Color on map: Yellow (#f3d03e)

Service
- Type: Rapid transit
- System: Guangzhou Metro
- Services: 1
- Operator: Guangzhou Metro Corporation
- Depot: Xilang Depot
- Rolling stock: 21 cars Siemens Modular Metro-AEG/Adtranz (original order); 48 Bombardier Movia with CRRC Changchun Railway Vehicles
- Daily ridership: 788,700 (2025 daily average); 2 million (2015 Peak)

History
- Opened: 28 June 1997 (29 years ago)
- Last extension: 16 February 1999 (27 years ago)

Technical
- Line length: 18.5 km (11.50 mi)
- Num of tracks: Double-track
- Character: Underground and At-grade
- Track gauge: 1,435 mm (4 ft 8 1/2 in) standard gauge
- Electrification: 1,500 V DC (overhead lines)
- Operating speed: 80 km/h (50 mph)
- Signalling: Siemens Trainguard LZB 700 M, FTGS Moving block

Line 1
- Simplified Chinese: 广州地铁1号线
- Traditional Chinese: 廣州地鐵1號線
- Cantonese Yale: Gwóngjāu Deihtit Yāt Houh Sin
Transcriptions
Standard Mandarin
- Hanyu Pinyin: Guǎngzhōu Dìtiě Yī Hào Xiàn
Yue: Cantonese
- Yale Romanization: Gwóngjāu Deihtit Yāt Houh Sin
- Jyutping: gwong2 zau1 dei6 tit3 jat1 hou6 sin3
- Canton Romanization: guong2 zeo1 déi6 tid3 yed1 hou6 xin3

Line 1 of the Guangzhou Metro runs from Xilang to Guangzhou East Railway Station (18.5 km (11.50 mi)). Apart from Kengkou and Xilang, all stations in Line 1 are underground. The first section, from Xilang to Huangsha, opened on 28 June 1997. The full line started operation on 28 June 1999. Line 1 is coloured yellow.

== History ==
=== Planning ===
Guangzhou began investigating a metro in the 1960s. In August 1960, work started with a series of 6 boreholes across Guangzhou to assess ground conditions. A report was produced, however no further progress was made following an economic downturn.

In 1965, with the Vietnam War escalating, it was decided to build a tunnel, initially as an air raid shelter, but with provision to run trains through it once the war was over. To maintain secrecy, the project was called 九号工程 (Project No. 9), named for the nine strokes in the characters for underground (地下). In the end, due to the lack of resources and rushed construction, the tunnel was never suitable for trains and the project was abandoned after the war. In the decades after, there were another 5 proposals for a metro, however none of these proceeded for various reasons.

By the 1990s, the growing population and traffic congestion in Guangzhou had renewed interest in a metro. The Guangzhou Municipal Government committed to building Line 1 in May 1991 and a year later, the Guangzhou Mass Transit Railway Corporation (now Guangzhou Metro Corporation) was formed. In March 1993, Line 1 received planning approval.

As this was only the fourth metro system in China, Guangzhou Metro looked overseas for expertise. Initially, there were talks with the France, however these were ultimately unsuccessful. In November 1993, Germany sent a delegation to China to negotiate a series of contracts, including a US$416m contract to build Line 1, which they ultimately won.

=== Construction ===
Work started on 28 December 1994. The main structure of Tiyu Xilu station was the first to be completed on 18 April 1997. On 28 June 1997, the line between Xilang and Huangsha was opened to passengers. At this time the line was in "sightseeing operation", operating with much lower frequencies and a flat fare of ¥5.

The largest station, Gongyuanqian, was completed on 20 August the same year and all tunnel boring was completed on 3 October. Train testing began on 30 September the following year, and all construction work had been completed by 28 December. From 16 February - 2 March 1999, the full line opened for "sightseeing operation" again. Following more testing, the line was officially opened on 28 June 1999. The total investment was 12.2616 billion yuan with an average cost per kilometer of 662.9 million yuan.

Segment	Commencement	Length	Station(s)	Name
Xilang — Huangsha	28 June 1997	5.4 km (3.36 mi)	5	(initial section)
Huangsha — Guangzhou East	16 February 1999	13.1 km (8.14 mi)	11	(final section)

=== Upgrades ===
In 2004, station ventilation and electrical systems started to be updated and platforms strengthened in preparation for retrofitting of platform screen doors in all stations, one of the first PSD retrofit projects in Mainland China. By 2009, all stations on Line 1 were retrofitted with PSDs.

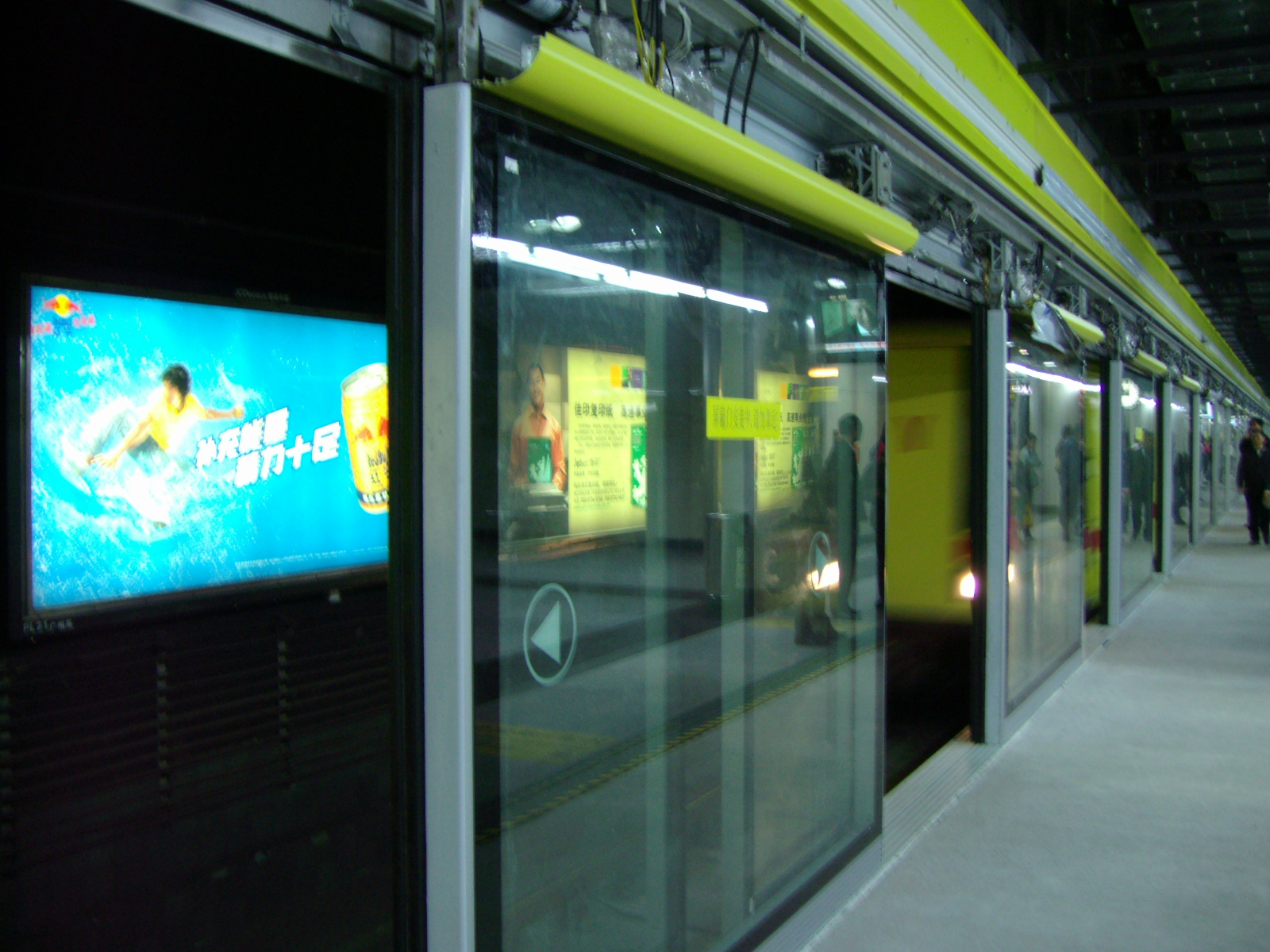
Retrofitting for PSDs on Line 1

Since Line 1 began operation, there have been several incidents of service disruptions due to overhead catenary cable breakages. During that period, Guangzhou Metro experimented rigid catenary installations between Kengkou and Huadiwan stations. Rigid catenary was promoted on all newer lines using overhead electric traction such as Line 2. Beginning in 2007, Guangzhou Metro began converting Line 1's overhead into rigid catenary without shutting down regular service. Instead, trains ran at a speed of 30 km/h (19 mph) when passing through the temporary transition sections.

In 2011, Line 1 carried out renovation work on the walls of stations along the entire line, removing the original wall tiles and replacing them with gray tiles. Chen Yihua, a middle school student from Guangzhou No. 16 Middle School, attracted media attention by protesting the rationale behind the renovation, arguing that the new uniform tiles destroyed the unique decoration and design features of each Line 1 station. In the end, the project was suspended with only some stations renovated. The rest of the stations remained as is temporarily. In 2017, the platforms of Line 1's Guangzhou East Railway Station began to be renovated, having its wall tiles and false ceiling decorations replaced. However, the replaced tiles and decorations were similar in color to the original. Subsequently, the rest of the underground stations also began to have wall tiles replaced and decorations hung up accordingly, completing the remaining station renovations using designs as close to the original style as possible.

In June 2016, Guangzhou Metro began to study how to extend the service life of A1 trains, which were introduced in 1997. The A1s were the rolling stock used during the opening of Line 1 and are the oldest in the Guangzhou Metro. The first A1 train started the refurbishment process between 2019–2020. The refurbished trains feature rebuilt interiors, lighting and electrical systems as well as LCD passenger information screens. The A3 trains were also updated with their dot-matrix route maps replaced by full color LCD passenger information screens.

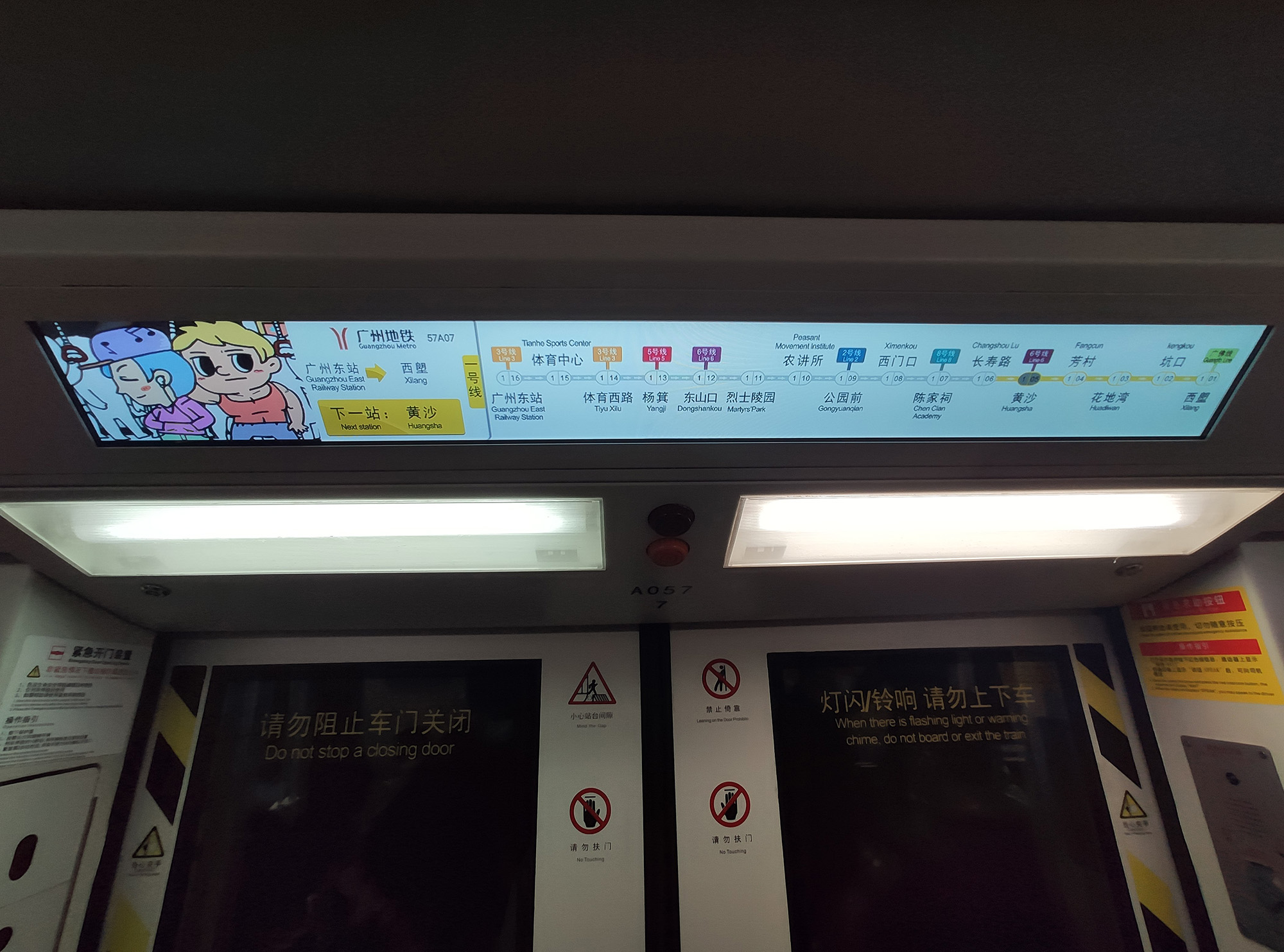
Retrofitted LCD passenger display on an A3 car.

In order to ensure the continuation of reliable daily operations, there were plans to upgrade the existing aging signaling system of Line 1. According to the tender information, it will be upgraded to a newer version of the Siemens signaling system. In February 2022, Guangzhou Metro decided to use the holidays in March and April to upgrade the catenary, signaling system and other equipment of Line 1. During the 16-day upgrade and renovation period, the two-way traffic of Line 1 was closed 1.5 hours earlier.

== Description ==
Line 1 starts at Xilang on the southwest edge of Guangzhou in Liwan district (formerly Fangcun district) as a surface level line. It then runs north, diving underground to cross the Pearl River in an immersed tube tunnel, the first to be built in China. It then enters the old city at Huangsha, turning east to follow Zhongshan Road. Finally, it reaches the newer Tianhe district, turning north to terminate at Guangzhou East Railway Station.

Although Line 1 has largely not been expanded since 1999, the passenger flows of Line 1 has been increasing as the Guangzhou Metro network continues to rapidly expand its coverage in and around Guangzhou. At present, the average daily passenger flow has exceeded one million passengers per day, ranking among highest of Guangzhou Metro's lines. Trains are often crowded during the morning and evening peak hours, and the platforms of key transfer stations (Gongyuanqian, Tiyu Xilu etc.) are even more crowded. Line 1 remains busy throughout the day leading to it being the subway line with the highest passenger intensity in Mainland China with 55,000 passengers/day/km in 2019.

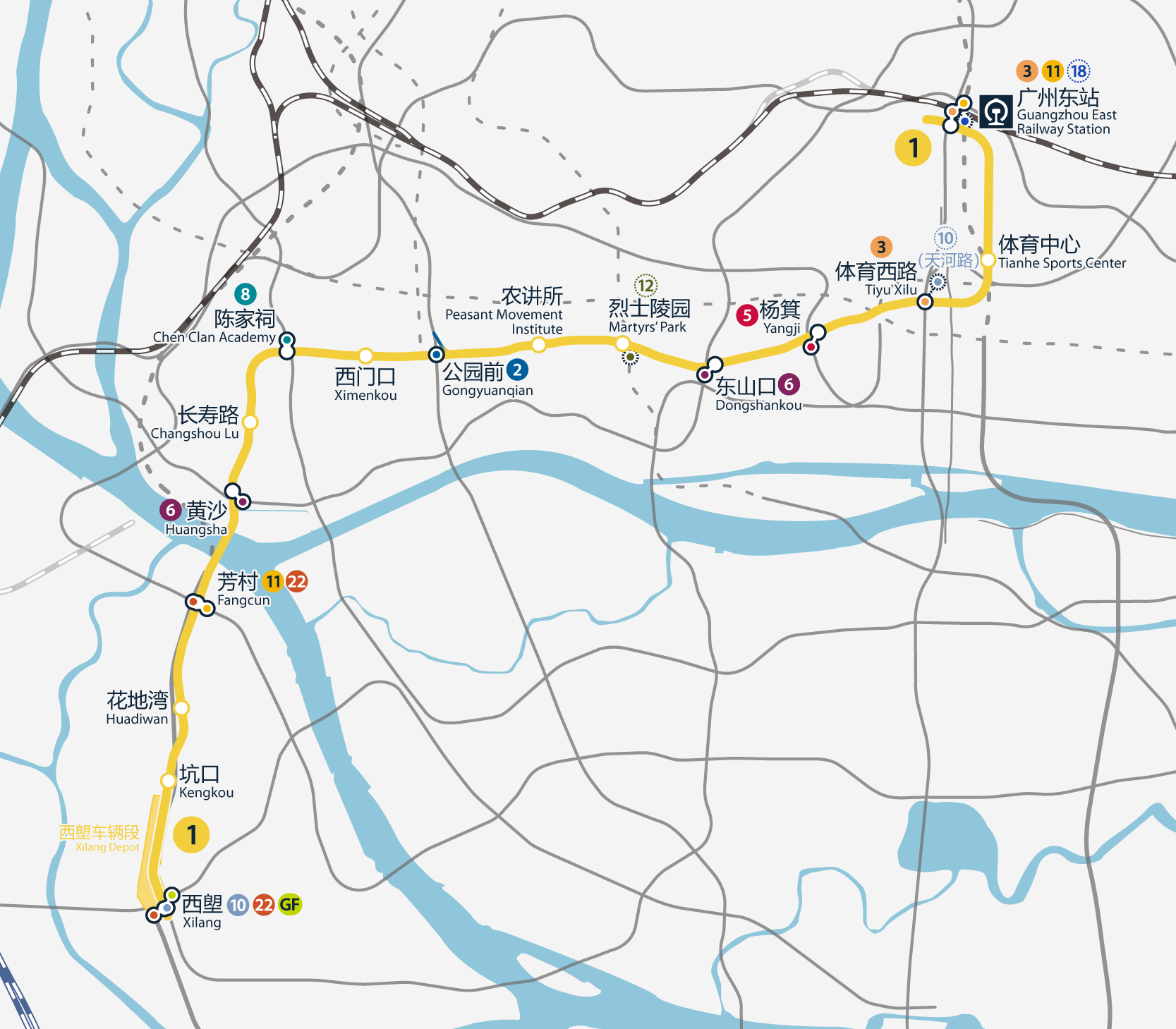
Line 1 drawn to scale.

== Stations ==
- OSI - Out-of-station interchange (only available for IC cards users)

Station No.	Station name		Connections	Future Connections	Distance km		Location
Station No.	English	Chinese	Connections	Future Connections	Distance km		Location
101	Xilang	西塱	Guangfo GF18 10 1001 22 2207		0.00	0.00	Liwan
102	Kengkou	坑口			1.64	1.64	Liwan
103	Huadiwan	花地湾			1.03	2.67	Liwan
104	Fangcun	芳村	11 1120 22 2208		1.35	4.02	Liwan
105	Huangsha	黄沙	6 607		1.45	5.47	Liwan
106	Changshou Lu	长寿路			0.77	6.24	Liwan
107	Chen Clan Academy	陈家祠	8 812		1.16	7.4	Liwan
108	Ximenkou	西门口			1.01	8.41	Yuexiu
109	Gongyuanqian	公园前	2 213		1.02	9.43	Yuexiu
110	Peasant Movement Institute	农讲所			1.17	10.6	Yuexiu
111	Martyrs' Park	烈士陵园		12 1215	1.08	11.68	Yuexiu
112	Dongshankou	东山口	6 614		1.07	12.75	Yuexiu
113	Yangji	杨箕	5 511		1.41	14.16	Yuexiu
114	Tiyu Xilu	体育西路	3 311; GBRT; OSI: APM (Tianhenan APM07)	10 (via Tianhe Road) OSI: 13 (Huacheng Square North) 1315	1.36	15.52	Tianhe
115	Tianhe Sports Center	体育中心			1.04	16.56	Tianhe
116	Guangzhou East Railway Station	广州东站	3 318 11 1108; GS GGQ	18	1.96	18.52	Tianhe
