= Chen Clan Ancestral Hall =

Former academic temple in Guangzhou, China

Chen Clan Ancestral Hall Chen Clan Academy
- 陈家祠
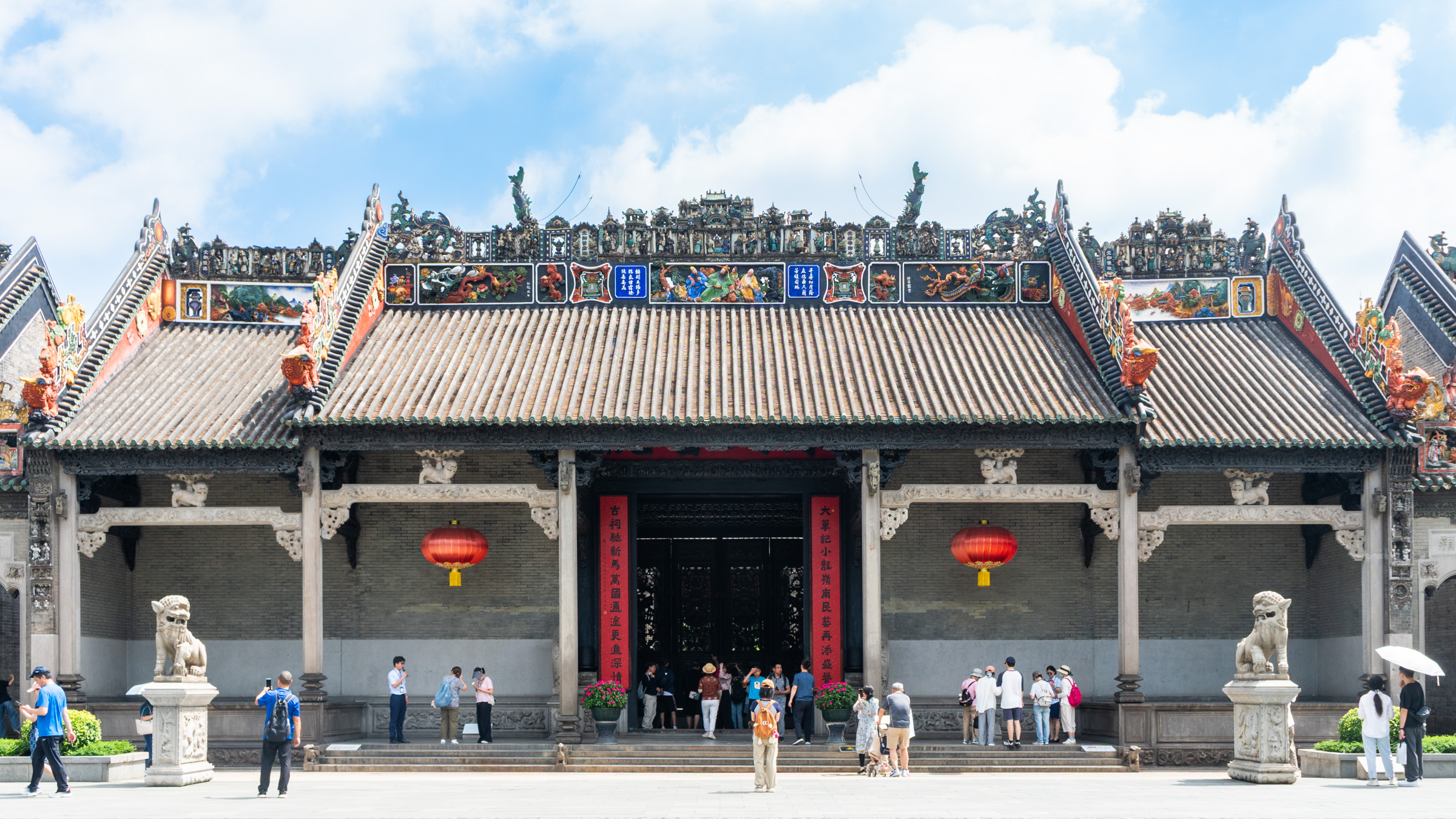

- Location within Guangdong
- Established: 1894
- Location: Guangzhou, China
- Coordinates: 23°7′47.13″N 113°14′25.8″E
- Type: Cultural

Chen Clan Ancestral Hall
- Simplified Chinese: 陈家祠
- Traditional Chinese: 陳家祠
- Literal meaning: Chen Family Ancestral Hall
Transcriptions
Standard Mandarin
- Hanyu Pinyin: Chén Jiā Cí
Yue: Cantonese
- Yale Romanization: Chàhn Gà Chìh
- Jyutping: Can^{4} Gaa^{1} Ci^{4}
- IPA: [tsʰɐn˩.ka˥.tsʰi˩]

Guangdong Folk Art Museum
- Simplified Chinese: 广东民间工艺博物馆
- Traditional Chinese: 廣東民間工藝博物館
Transcriptions
Standard Mandarin
- Hanyu Pinyin: Guǎngdōng Mínjiān Gōngyì Bówùguǎn
Yue: Cantonese
- Jyutping: gwong2 dung1 man4 gaan1 gung1 ngai6 bok3 mat6 gun2

The Chen Clan Ancestral Hall or Chen Clan Academy is an academic temple in Guangzhou, China, built by the 72 Chen clans for their juniors' accommodation and preparation for the imperial examinations in 1894 during the Qing dynasty. Later it was changed to be the Chen Clan's Industry College, and then middle schools afterward. Now it houses the Guangdong Folk Art Museum.

Located at Zhongshan 7th Road beside the Chen Clan Academy metro station, the Chen Clan Ancestral Hall is a symmetric complex consist of 19 buildings with nine halls and six courtyards. Facing south, the complex forms around a north–south axis. A large collection of southern China art pieces, such as wood carvings and pottery, can be found in the structure. The Chen Clan Ancestral Hall complex exemplifies traditional Chinese architecture and decoration style, and has influenced cultural and architectural developments worldwide. It was added in the list of "Cultural Relics of National Importance under the Protection of the State" in 1988.

== Name ==
From its former purpose, the Chen Clan Ancestral Hall is also known as the Chen Clan Academy. From the Cantonese pronunciation of the name, its Chinese name was formerly romanized as Chun-Ka-Che.

== History ==
Chen Ruinan and Zhaonan, Cantonese returning from America, first proposed raising money from the various Chen lineages to build a temple for worship of their ancestors and an academy to train their clansmen for the imperial examination during the late Qing dynasty. With money donated by Chens abroad and in 72 of Guangdong's counties, the hall was finished in 1894. When the imperial exam was abolished in 1905, the academy became a practical school for members of the clan.

The Guangzhou municipal government approved the hall's status as a special preserve in 1957 and introduced a folk arts and crafts gallery in 1959. During the Cultural Revolution, the artwork of the hall was saved from destruction by "clever local officials" who installed a printshop for publishing works by Mao Zedong. The hall now serves as the Guangdong Folk Art Museum.

== Structure ==
The Chen Clan Ancestral Hall is a traditional Chinese academic complex covering 13200 square meters. The complex consists of 19 buildings with nine halls and six courtyards which are connected by corridors and ride north to south in a symmetric pattern. On the main axis lie the Head-entrance (Chinese: 頭門), the Gathering Hall (Chinese: 聚賢堂) and the Back Hall (Chinese: 後堂). These three main buildings are separated with courtyards.

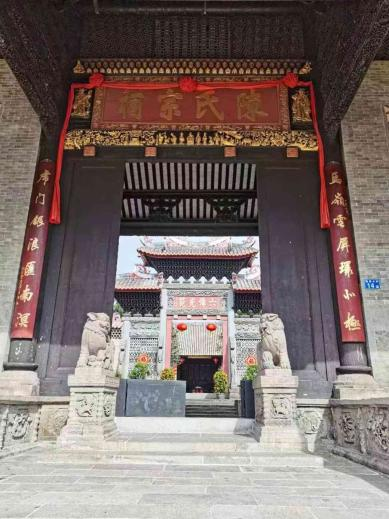
Entrance of the Hall

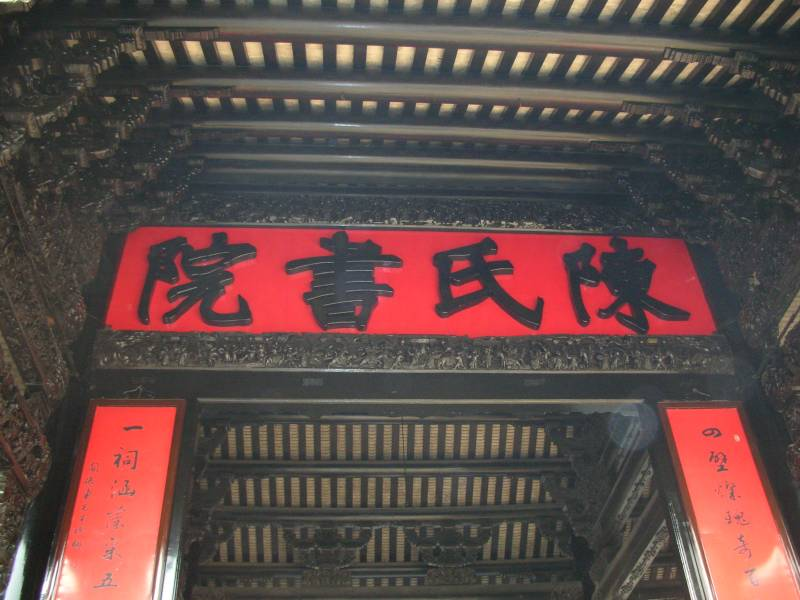
Tablet of the Chen Clan Ancestral Hall

The Head-entrance is 27.56 metres (90.4 ft) wide and 14.91 metres (48.9 ft) deep with 17 columns, all decorated with flowers and figures. On the top of the gate of the Head-entrance hangs a tablet with words 陳氏書院, meaning "Chen Clan Academy". On the sides of the gate sit stone mats and a pair of 2.25-meter-high (7.4 ft) stone drums. River gods are painted in color on the gate. Inside the gate there are four double-side engraved screen. The main beams are decorated with birds, flowers, human figures plasters, bats and lions.

The Gathering Hall was once a place for meeting and worship of the Chen clansmen and now it is used as an ancestral hall. It is 27.84 metres (91.3 ft) wide and 16.7 metres (55 ft) deep with 21 main beams and 6 carved stone columns. In front of the hall lies a stone gazebo surrounded by stone balustrades. Inside the hall sit twelve engraved folding screens. The pottery sculpture on the beams was renovated in 1981.

Memorial tablets of ancestors were placed on a 21-step wooden shelves in the Back Hall, which was once used for worship of ancestors. In the rooms sit 7-meter-high wooden-carved niche covers.

Buildings are separated with "Qingyun alleys" (Chinese: 青雲巷) and connected with corridors.

The buildings in the Chen Clan Ancestral Hall are fully decorated with wood carving, stone carving, brick carving, pottery, plaster and iron engraving. The content of these decoration are mostly flowers, birds, Cantonese fruits and scenes in traditional dramas.

== Art works ==
The Chen Clan Ancestral Hall is notable for the rich decoration which exist inside, outside the halls and in almost every beams, ridges, walls and columns. This make the Chen Clan Ancestral Hall a large collection of wood carving, stone carving, brick carving, pottery, plaster and iron engraving.

=== Pottery ===
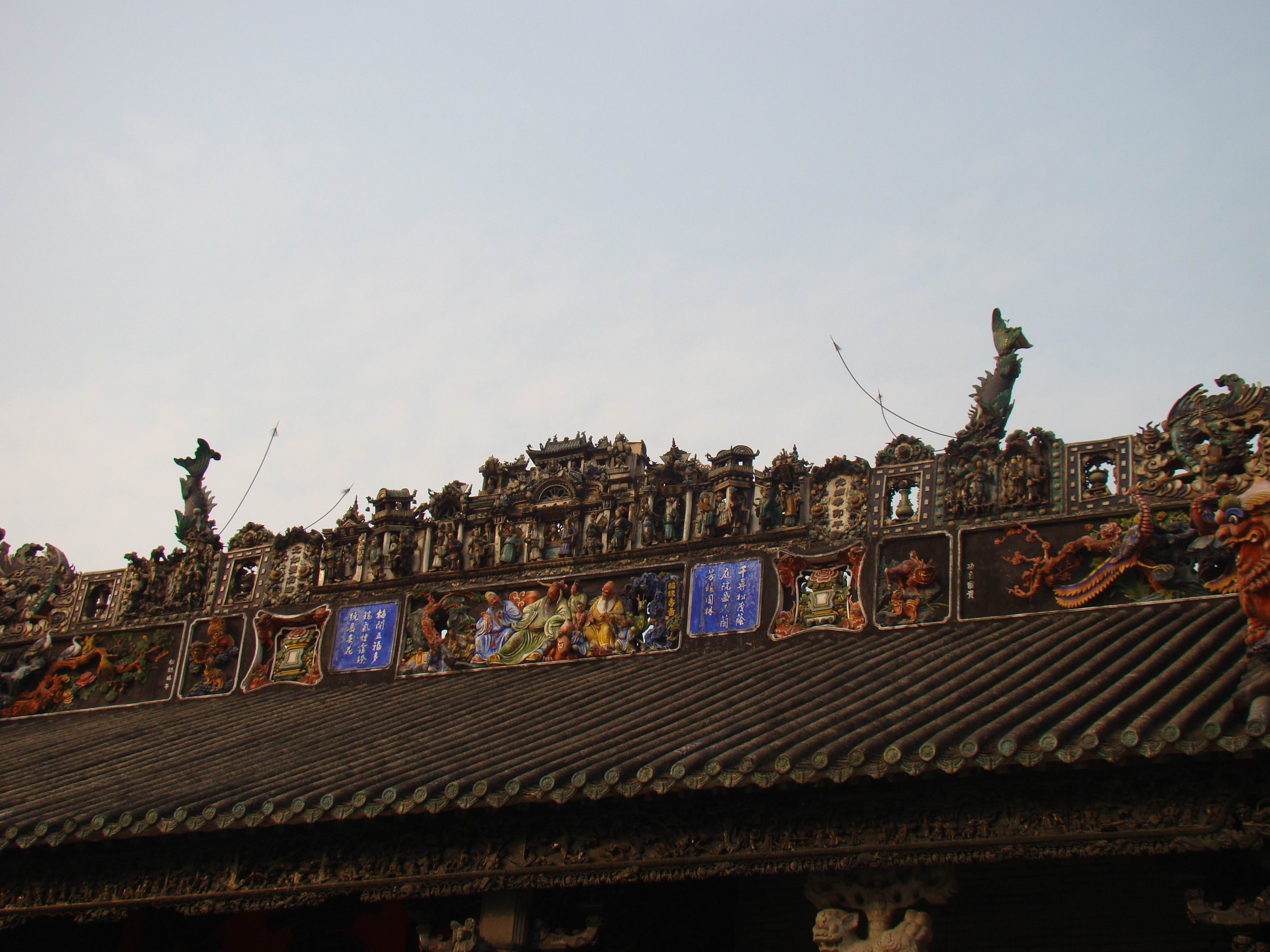
Pottery flying cod on the ridge

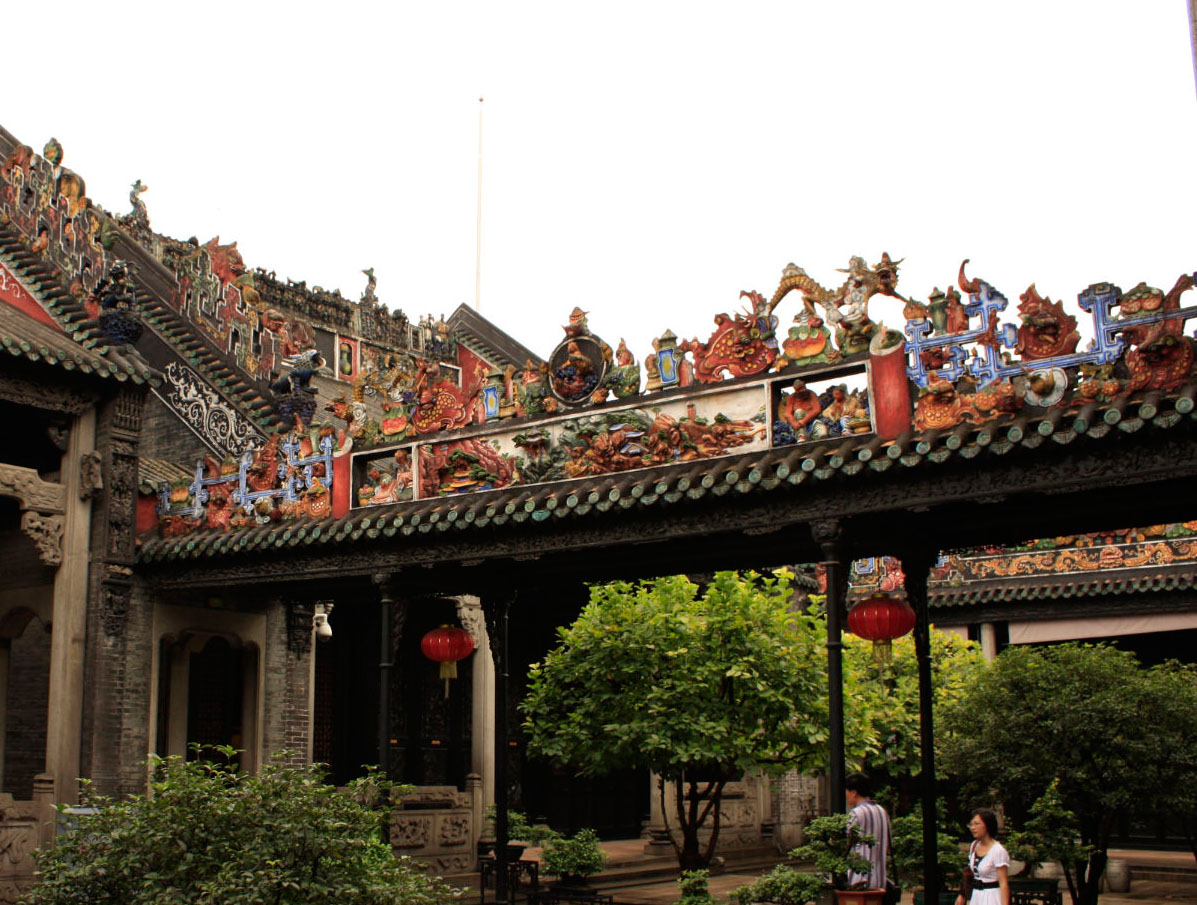
Pottery on the ridge

One of the most distinguished features of the Chen Clan Ancestral Hall is the 11 pottery ridge crest, which was installed on the nine great halls of the academy. Each ridge crest has a theme taken from famous traditional dramas. Some are figures of characters in a play, some have series of more than ten scenes in a drama. With summering and exaggerating, the pottery ridge crests show the featured drama scene in comic series. The pottery ridge crest on the roof of the Gathering Hall has the largest scale and most delicate manufacture among all. This ridge crest spans 27 meters, 2.9 meters in height, 4.26 meters high with the plaster base and contains a total of 224 figures. The scenes in this ridge crest are "Celebrating the birth of gods", "Qilin giving people offspring", "The bearded man and Li Jing" and some others. Along with the figures are patterns of Yutang birds and peony, which represent wealth and glamour, and shapes of melons and fruits, which represent flourish of offspring. Moreover, the tip of the ridge crests are flying cods, which were believed to be a half-dragon half-fish creature. These flying cod figures have tentacles reaching out from the roof to the sky, which make the profile of the building more elegant.

=== Wood carving ===
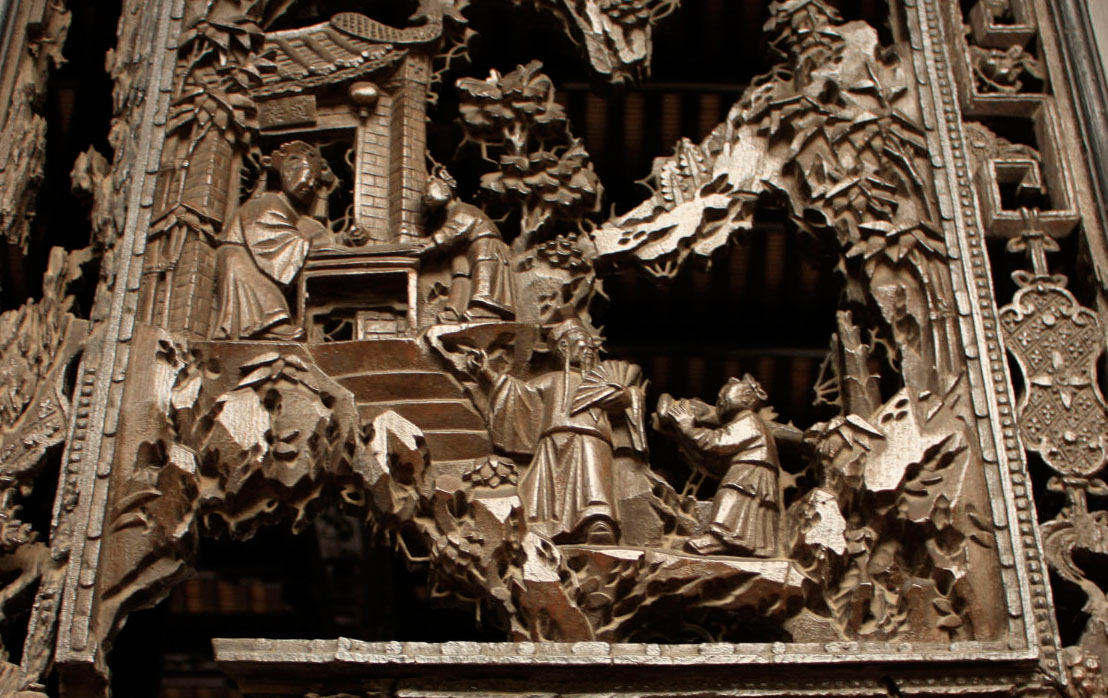
Wood carvings on screen doors (close up)

The Chen Clan Ancestral Hall has a large collection of wood carvings, which can be seen everywhere in the halls at the corners of the beams, walls, and doors. On the beams in the Head entrance sit eight pieces of exquisite wood carvings describing historical stories like Tongque Tai (Chinese: 銅雀臺), Celebrating the birth of the God Mother (Chinese: 王母祝壽) and The alliance of Goujian, the king of Yue (Chinese: 越王勾踐會盟). The most prominent wood carvings work in Chen Clan Academy is the sixteen double-sided wood carving screen doors in the back of the Gathering Hall, each describing a classic drama scene in old story books like the Romance of the Three Kingdoms and The biography of Yue Fei. These wood carvings have abundant high resolution figures as each facial expression can be clearly distinguished. Also, wood carvings work from Guangdong can be found in the folk art and craft gallery.

=== Plaster carvings ===
The plaster carvings in the Chen Clan Ancestral Hall lie mostly on the bases of ridges and the roofs of corridors and have a total length of 1800 meter in the temple. The theme of the plaster sculptures are similar to those of pottery crests: scenes in traditional dramas, birds and flowers, pavilions, and landscapes. Plaster in old Cantonese houses were called "grass tails" since the pattern are often shaped like curling grass and placed on the end of walls. In wealthy families, larger scaled and more delicate plaster were used in the house decorating. Since plaster has to be made on site, artists can bring their talent to play according to the surrounding. The plaster carvings in the Chen Clan Ancestral Hall were example of exquisite plaster art: some were made as they go through the wall; some come out up to 60 centimeter from the wall, giving a three-dimensional effect.

=== Brick carving ===
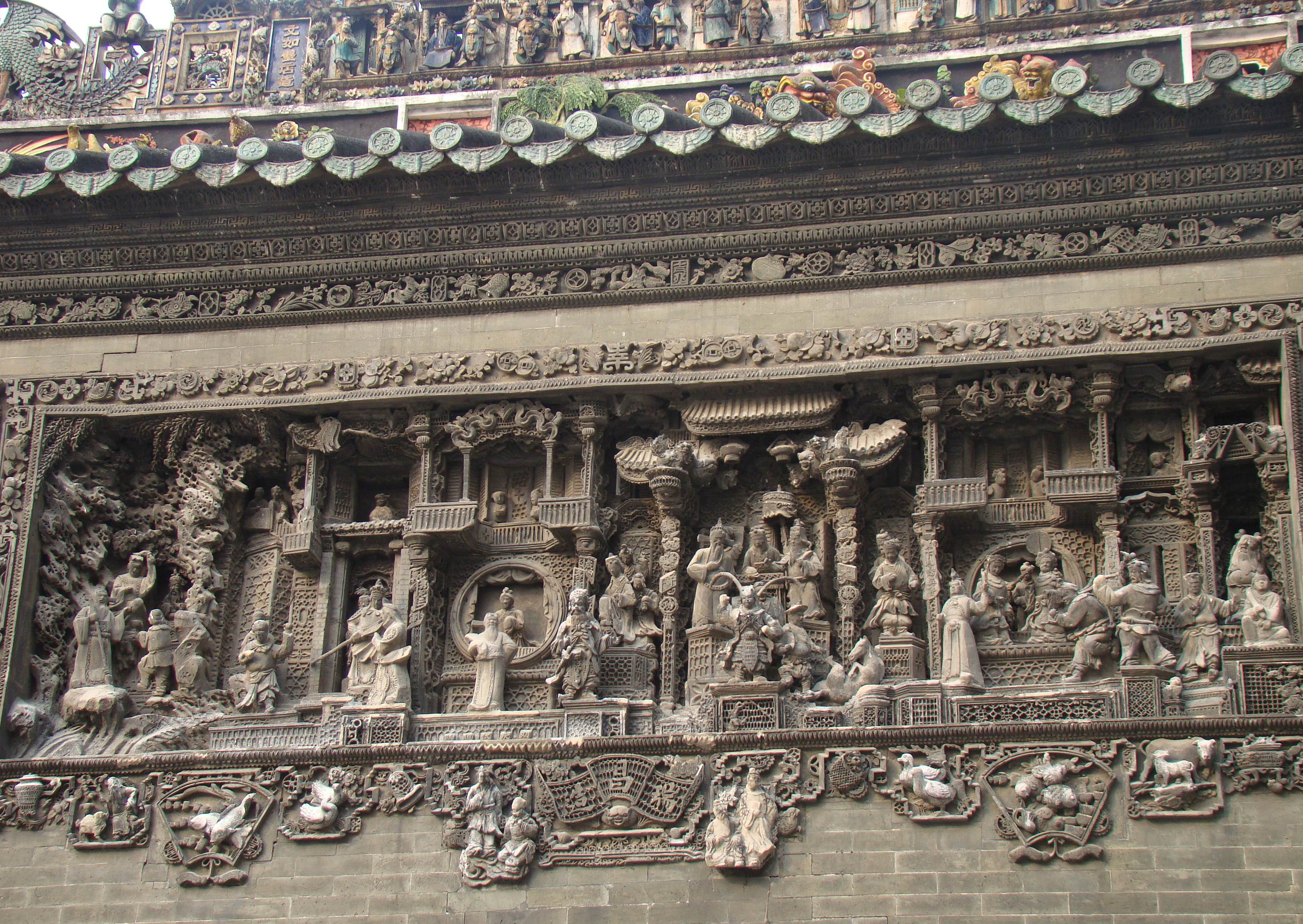
Brick Carving "Liu Qing taming 'the Wolf'"

Brick carvings in the Chen Clan Ancestral Hall lie on the inner walls of each great halls. The one on the east wall features the old story "Liu Qing taming 'the Wolf'", with more than 40 figures in the picture, describing the lively scene of the man Liu Qing taming the wild horse from the west named "the wolf" in the time of Northern Song. Each figure has a distinguished facial expression and pose.

=== Engraving ===
The iron engravings in the Chen Clan Ancestral Hall are mainly used on the platform railings. These engravings have symmetric patterns and four different themes, which are "The Qilin and the Phoenix", "Dragons and orbs", "The three goats" and "Goldfish in a pond". The iron engravings railings are dim in color and delicate in structure. They are rarely seen in traditional Cantonese architecture.
