= Guangzhou East railway station =

Railway and metro interchange station in Guangzhou

Guangzhoudong 广州东
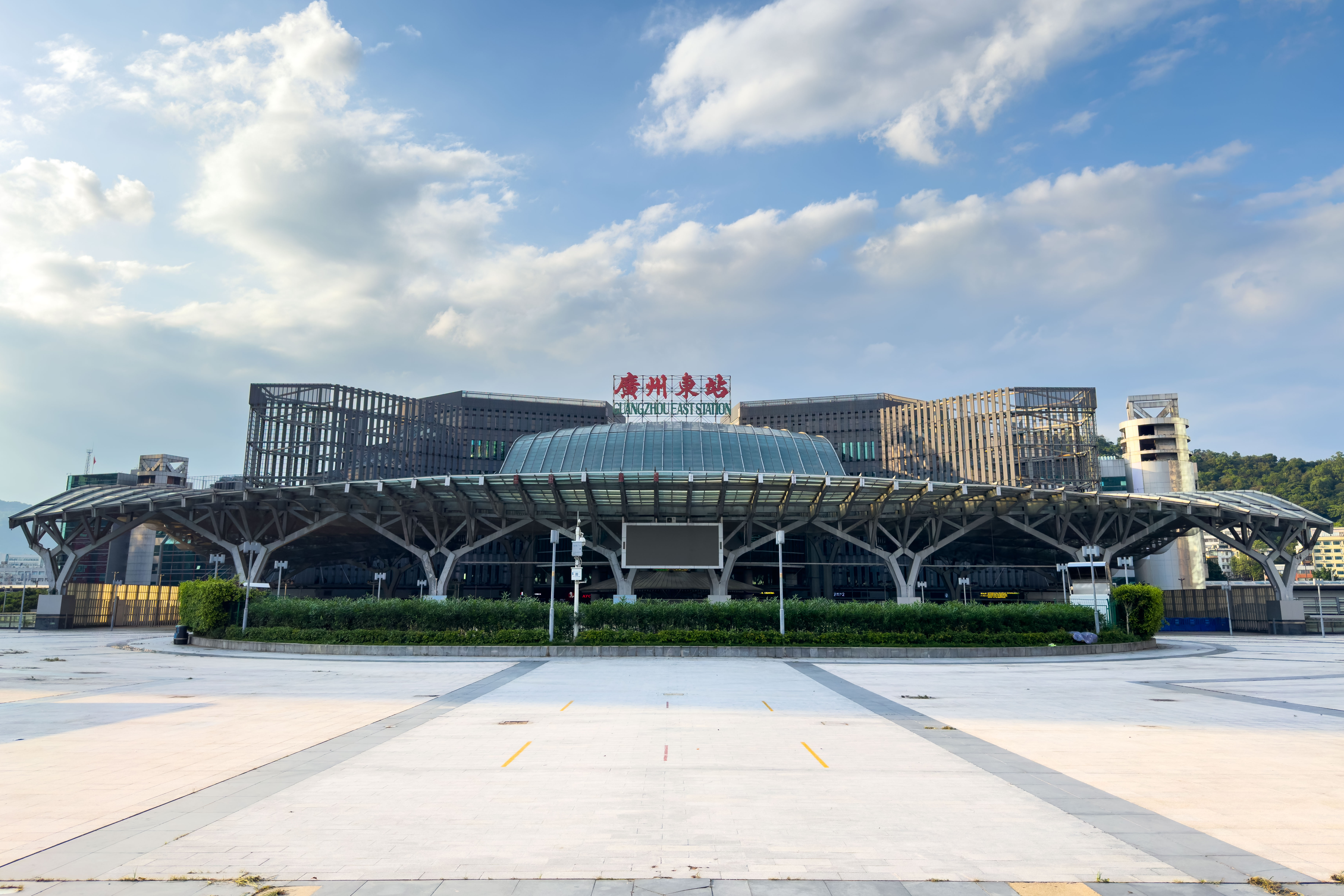

Chinese name
- Simplified Chinese: 广州东站
- Traditional Chinese: 廣州東站
- Postal: Canton East station
Transcriptions
Standard Mandarin
- Hanyu Pinyin: Gǔangzhōudōng Zhàn
Yue: Cantonese
- Yale Romanization: Gwóngjāu Dūng Jaahm
- Jyutping: Gwong^{2}zau^{1} Dung^{1} Zaam^{6}

General information
- Other names: Guangzhoudong railway station, Tianhe railway station (formerly); Guangzhou East railway station
- Location: 1 Dongzhan Lu, Tianhe District, Guangzhou, Guangdong; China
- Coordinates: 23°9′12.58″N 113°19′11.09″E
- Operator: China Railway Guangzhou Group; Guangshen Railway Company; Guangzhou Metro
- Lines: Guangzhou–Shenzhen railway Guangzhou Metro: 1 3 11
- Platforms: 12 (5 island platforms, 2 side platforms); 6 (3 island platforms)
- Tracks: 12; 6
- Connections: Bus terminal

Construction
- Structure type: Surface; Underground
- Accessible: Yes

Other information
- Station code: China Railway: TMIS code: 23711; Telegraph code: GGQ; Pinyin code: GZD; Metro: 116 318 1108
- Classification: Top Class station

History
- Opened: 1940 (86 years ago); Line 1: 28 June 1999 (27 years ago); Line 3: 26 December 2005 (20 years ago); Line 11: 29 September 2025 (13 months ago)
- Former names: Tianhe railway station

Services
Preceding station	China Railway	Following station
Guangzhou Terminus	Guangzhou–Shenzhen railway	Shipai towards Shenzhen
Terminus	Guangzhou–Meizhou–Shantou railway	Shipai towards Shantou
Preceding station	Guangzhou Metro	Following station
Tianhe Sports Center towards Xilang	Line 1	Terminus
Linhexi towards Haibang	Line 3	Yantang towards Airport North (Terminal 2)
Shahe Outer Circle	Line 11	Longkou West Inner Circle
Future services
Jingxilu towards Huachengjie	Line 18	Xiancun towards Wanqingsha
Location

Guangzhoudong (Guangzhou East) railway station (simplified Chinese: 广州东站; traditional Chinese: 廣州東站; Jyutping: gwong2 zau1 dung1 zaam6; Cantonese Yale: Gwóngjāu Dūng Jaahm), formerly known as Tianhe railway station (Chinese: 天河站; Cantonese Yale: Tīnhòh Jaahm) serves the city of Guangzhou, located in the city's Tianhe District.

The railway, metro, and bus terminal stations is interconnected as a single station complex. There was an immigration check point within the station for Guangzhou–Kowloon through train passengers travelling to and from Hong Kong, until the service was discontinued due to the COVID-19 pandemic. Guangzhou East is served by the Guangzhou-Hong Kong Express Rail Link, however customs and immigration for passengers entering mainland China are handled in "Main Port Area" of West Kowloon Station in Hong Kong.

== Rail services ==
Rail services serving Guangzhou East railway station include:

- Guangzhou–Shenzhen railway
- Guangzhou–Hong Kong high-speed train
- Guangzhou–Shanwei high-speed railway
- Other high-speed train services to Fujian, Jiangxi, Zhejiang, etc.

== Metro services ==
An interchange station between Line 1, Line 3 and Line 11 of the Guangzhou Metro, and also the northern terminus of Line 1. It is located at the underground of the China Railway station in Linhe Zhonglu (Chinese: 林和中路; lit. 'Linhe Middle Road'), Tianhe District. It started operations on 28 June 1999 (Line 1), 26 December 2005 (Line 3) and 29 September 2025 (Line 11) respectively.

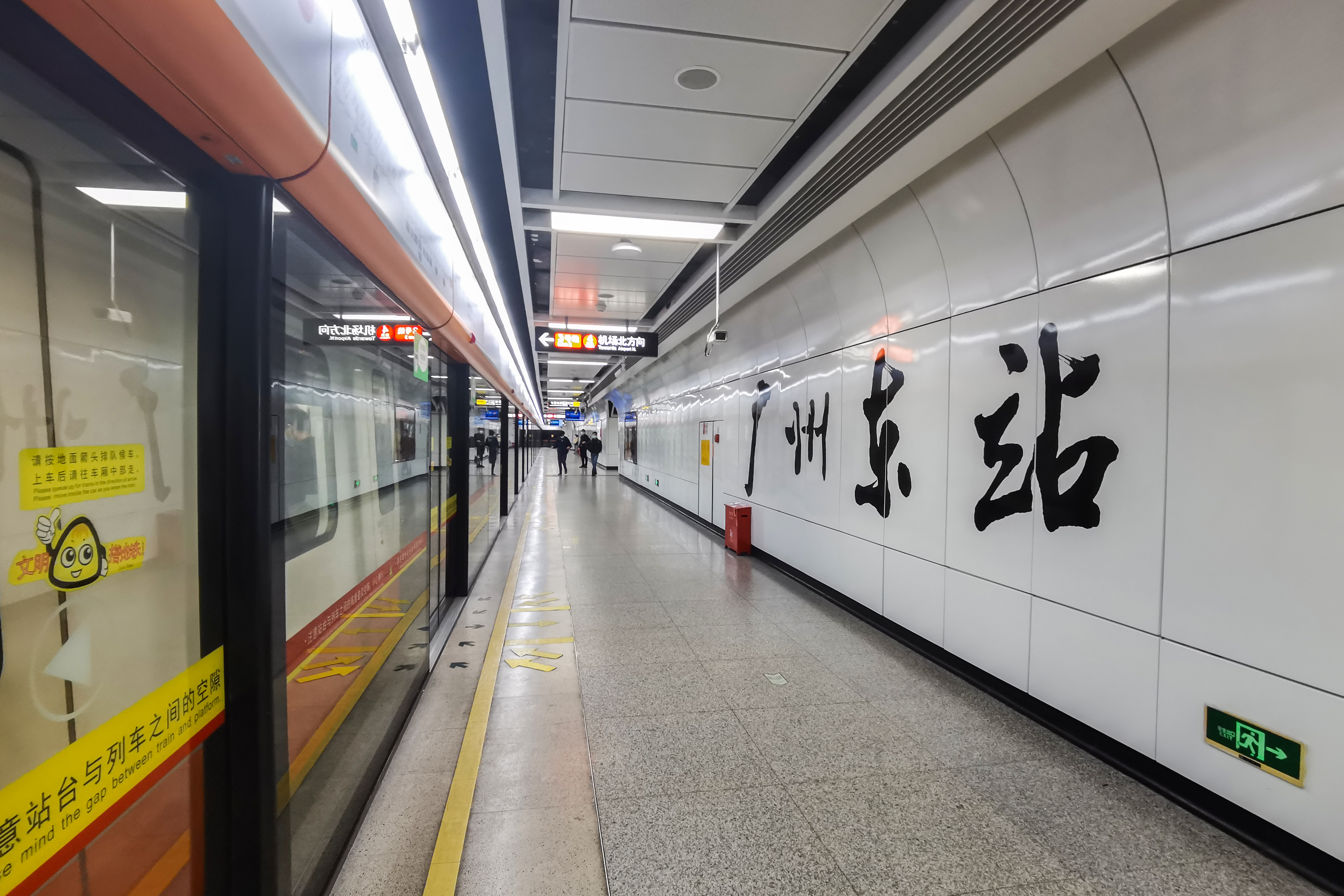
Platform 4 (Line 3 towards Airport North)

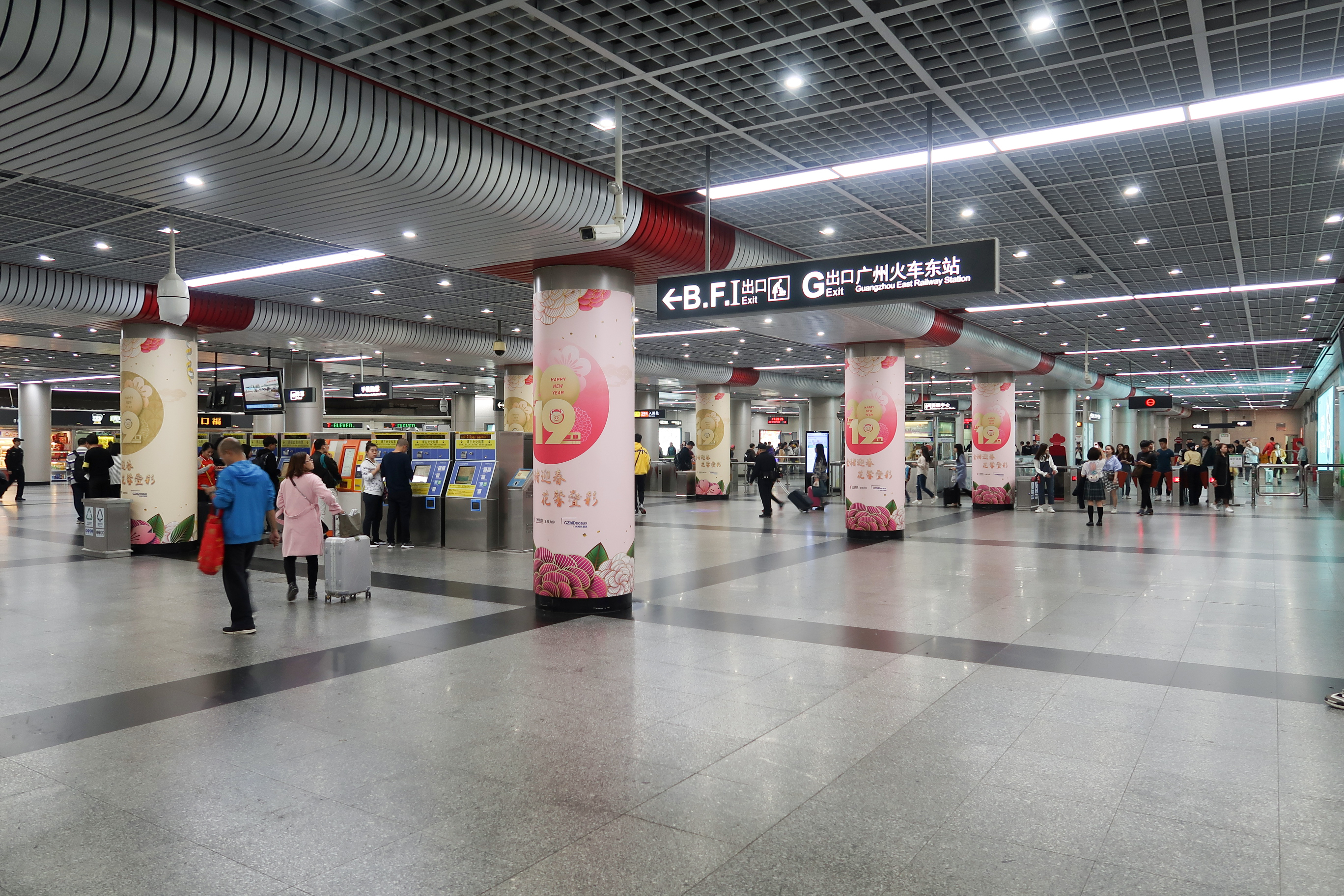
South concourse (Line 1)

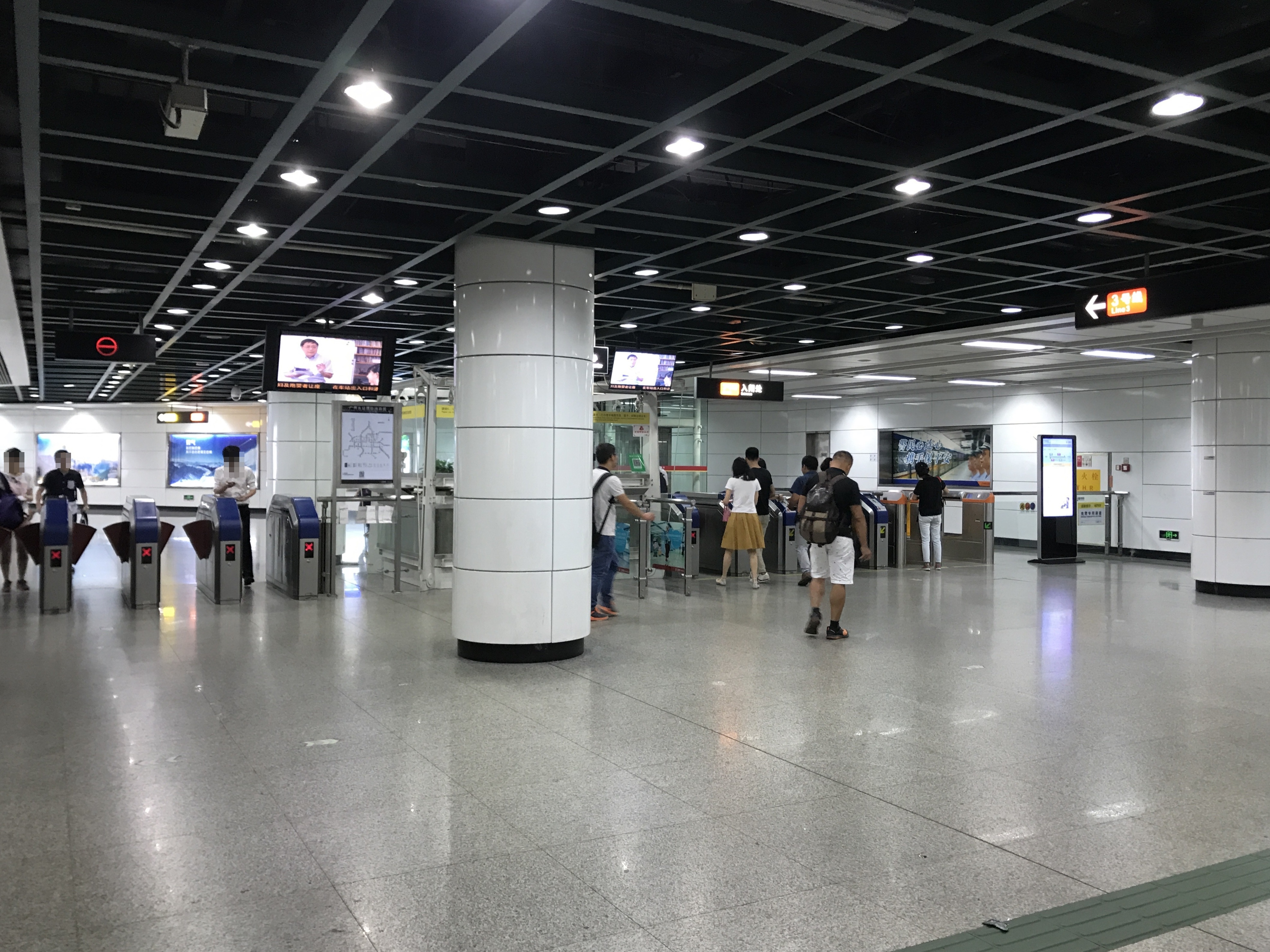
South concourse (Line 3)

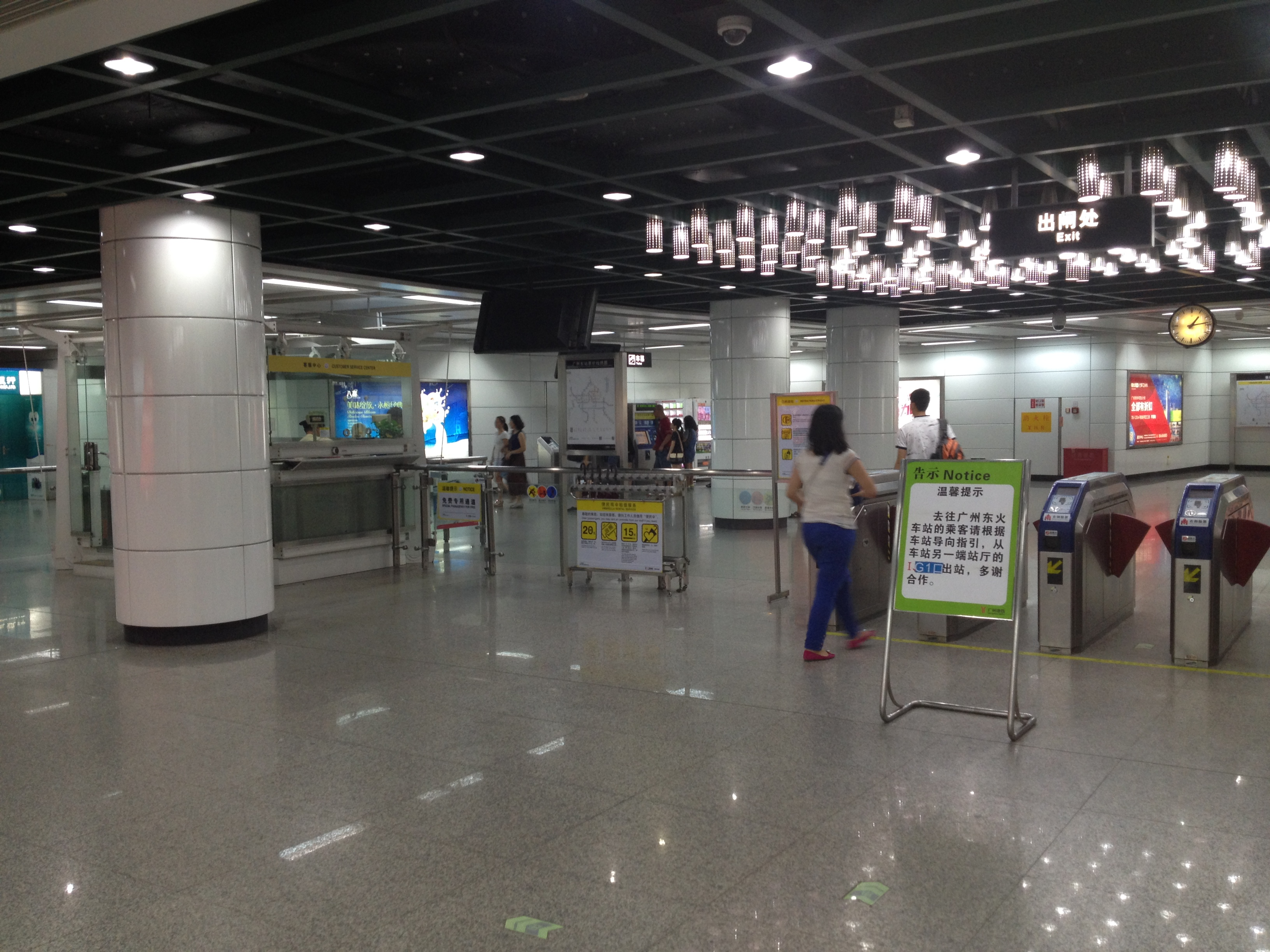
North concourse

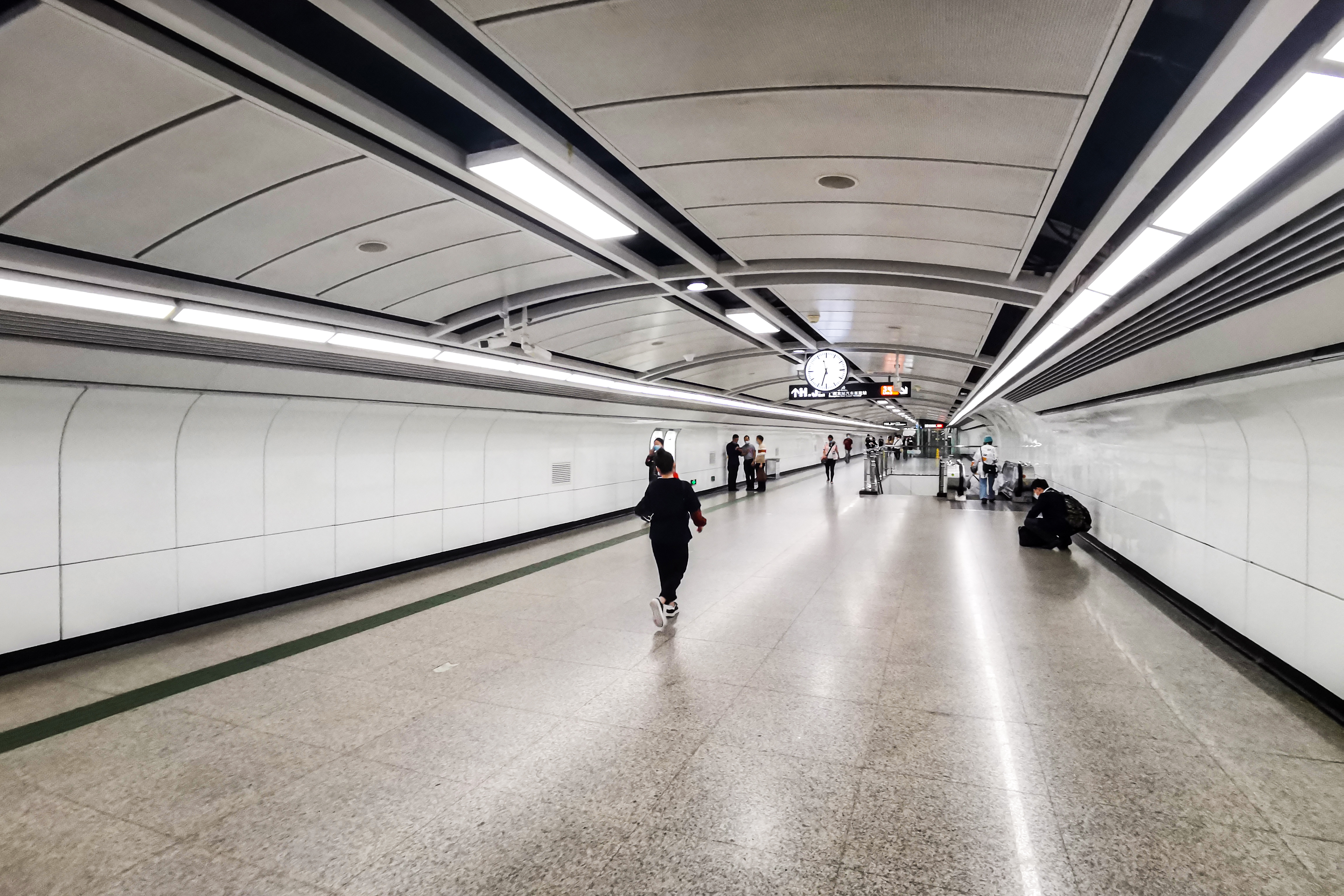
Paid transfer corridor

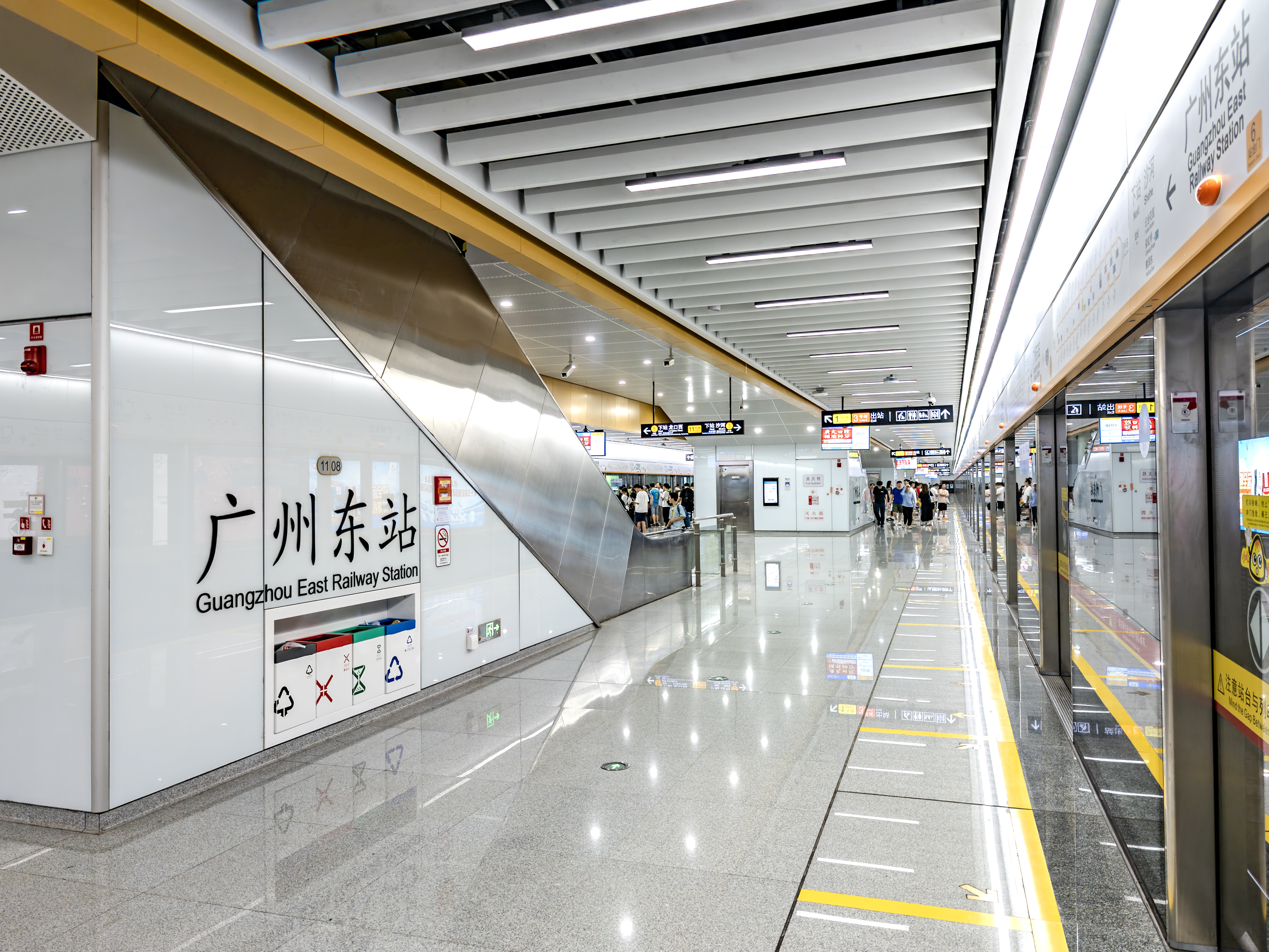
Line 11 platform
