= Baise Uprising =

Uprising in the Chinese Civil War

- Part of Chinese Civil War
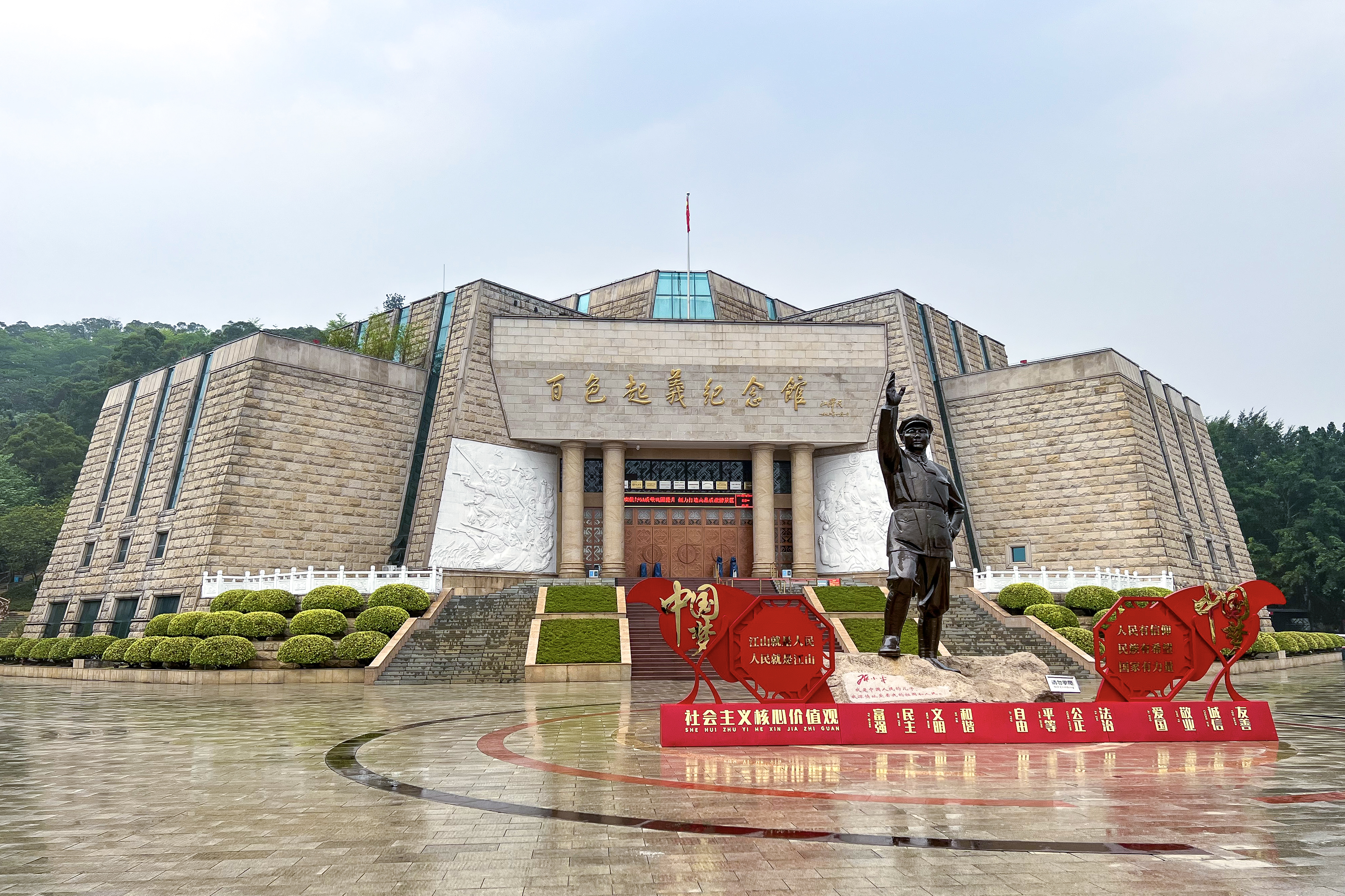
- Baise Uprising Memorial Hall in Youjiang District, Baise
Date	December 11, 1929 – 1931
Location	Guangxi
Result	Communist defeat

Belligerents
New Guangxi clique; National Revolutionary Army	Chinese Red Army

Commanders and leaders
Li Zongren	Zhang Yunyi; Li Mingrui; Deng Xiaoping; Wei Baqun

Baise Uprising
- Traditional Chinese: 百色起義
- Simplified Chinese: 百色起义
Transcriptions
Standard Mandarin
- Hanyu Pinyin: Bǎisè qǐyì

Alternative Chinese name
- Traditional Chinese: 右江暴動
- Simplified Chinese: 右江暴动
Transcriptions
Standard Mandarin
- Hanyu Pinyin: Yòujiāng bàodòng

The Baise Uprising was a short-lived uprising organized by the Chinese Communist Party (CCP) in northwestern Guangxi around the city of Baise. It officially began on December 11, 1929, and lasted until late 1931. The uprising established the Seventh Red Army and a soviet over a number of counties in the You River valley. It drew support from a pre-existing movement of Zhuang peasants led by Wei Baqun, and focused on land redistribution in the area it controlled. After a brief but costly attempt to capture Guangxi's major cities, the soviet was suppressed and surviving soldiers made their way to Jiangxi. Today, it is most famous for the role played by Deng Xiaoping, who was the CCP Central Committee's leading representative in Guangxi during the Uprising. Deng was strongly criticized, both during the Cultural Revolution and by modern historians, for the uprising's swift defeat and his decision to abandon the retreating Seventh Red Army.

== Background ==
=== Donglan peasants' movement ===
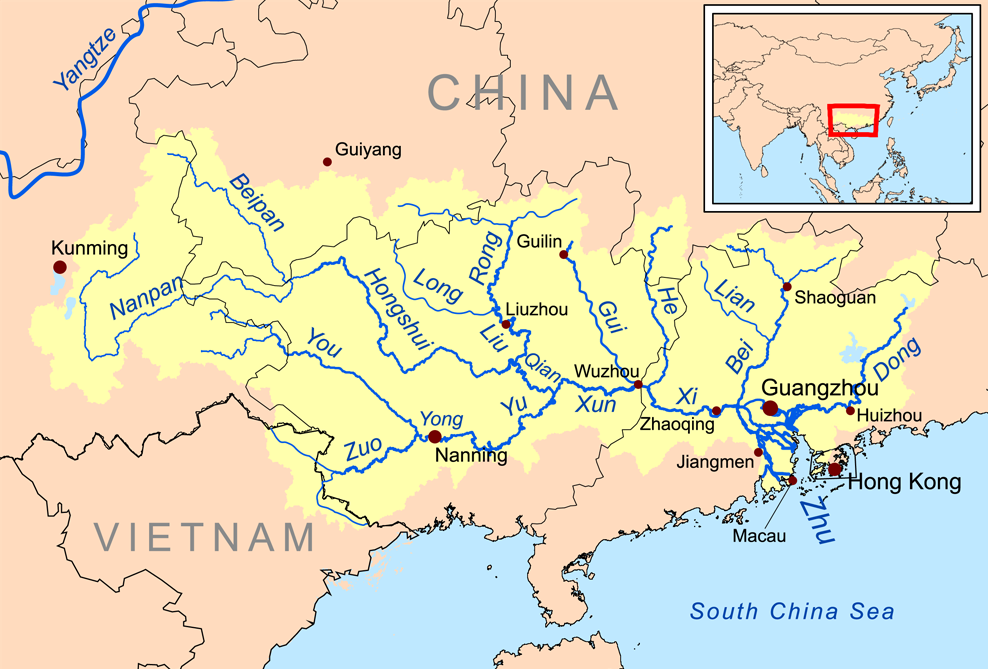
The Zuo and You River valleys had long been a hotbed of revolt in western Guangxi.

Guangxi is a province in southwestern China with several minority communities, the largest of which is the Zhuang. In the early 1900s, the Zhuang of the You and Zuo River valleys still retained an independent identity and frequently came into conflict with Han Chinese administrative officials. Wei Baqun was the son of a family of wealthy Zhuang peasants from Donglan County. Inspired by the rise of Chinese nationalism, Wei organized a company of peasants to take part in the National Protection War. He subsequently joined the Kuomintang (KMT or Nationalist Party) and led a local rebellion against corruption, warlordism, and the abuses of local elites. The rebellion succeeded in establishing him as a popular leader in Donglan, but it was eventually put down and Wei was forced to leave Donglan. He spent the next few years in the KMT stronghold of Guangzhou. There, he came in contact with Chinese Communist Party (CCP) members who were supporting the KMT in the First United Front. As part of their strategy to defeat the warlords, the two parties were organizing peasant associations in counties across southern China. Wei attended classes at the Peasant Movement Training Institute and toured several of the Communist-led peasant associations near Guangzhou. He was deeply impressed by Communist ideas, although he did not yet become a member of the CCP.

Wei returned to Donglan in 1925 as the KMT's special agent to organize peasant associations in Guangxi. He quickly reestablished contact with his supporters and they began the process of rebuilding the peasants' movement along the model of the organizations Wei had witnessed in Guangdong. The peasant associations made themselves popular with policies such as reduced taxes, banditry crackdowns, and especially the abolition of rent and debt collection. Membership in the Donglan's peasant associations reached 20,000 by September 1925 and quadrupled to 80,000 by late 1926, greater than those in any other county in Guangxi. The rapid growth of peasant movements in Donglan and elsewhere across southern China disturbed the conservative wing of the KMT. Guangxi was governed by a group of warlords known as the New Guangxi clique, aligned with the KMT's right-wing, and in February 1926, Governor Huang Shaohong sent in soldiers to suppress the Donglan peasants' movement. They perpetrated a bloody massacre of peasant leaders, but were withdrawn under pressure from the KMT's left-wing. Wei himself survived by retreating into the mountains. The same pattern repeated itself the following year when the right wing of the KMT orchestrated a takeover of the entire party and a purge of the Communists (see below). Once again, Nationalist forces briefly occupied the county before withdrawing and allowing Wei and his followers to re-assume control.

=== Overthrow of the Guangxi clique ===
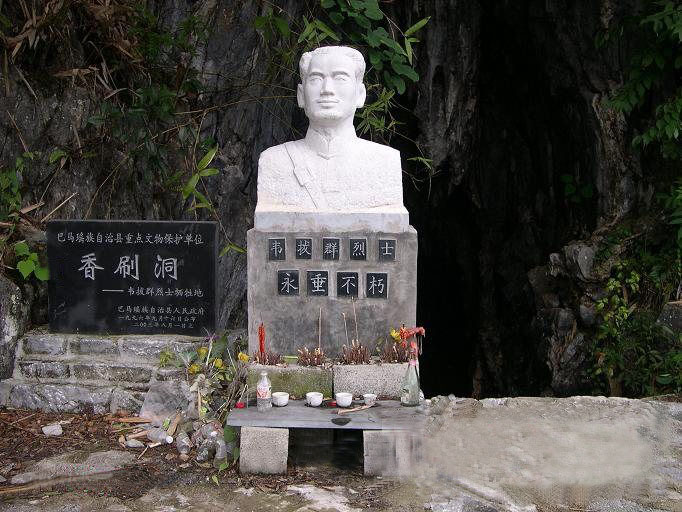
Bust of Wei Baqun

By 1929, the Kuomintang had completed the Northern Expedition, re-unifying the Republic of China. But in the process, the KMT had split into left- and right-wings: the left wing wanted to maintain the First United Front with the CCP, while the right-wing saw the CCP as subversive and wanted to break the alliance. In the end, right-winger Chiang Kai-shek defeated Wang Jingwei's left-wing faction and commenced a bloody purge of the Communists. The CCP went underground and eventually decided on a strategy of creating rural soviets. The Communists took advantage of the fact that many of the warlords who had allied with the KMT during the Northern Expedition were itching for an opportunity to rebel. The New Guangxi clique launched just such a revolt in March 1929. Chiang managed to defeat the New Guangxi clique only by bribing two of their subordinate generals, Li Mingrui and Yu Zuobo, to betray and overthrow them. Possibly unbeknownst to Chiang, Li and Yu were left-wing Nationalists, and after coming to power, they restored the policies of the United Front.

The CCP quickly took advantage of the situation. They sent cadres to infiltrate Guangxi, including Yu Zuoyu (the younger brother of Yu Zuobo) and Zhang Yunyi, an experienced military officer who had served in the KMT's National Revolutionary Army. They managed to receive high posts in the administration and organized Communist cells inside the Guangxi army. Later that year, Deng Xiaoping arrived representing the party's central committee. It was during this time that Wei Baqun formally decided to join the Communist Party.

== Events ==
=== Start of the Uprising ===
In October 1929, Wang Jingwei convinced Li Mingrui and Yu Zuobo to launch an uprising against Chiang Kai-shek and restore the left wing of the KMT to power. The Communists in Guangxi strongly opposed this idea because it had little chance for success and put their own plans for local insurrection at risk. They could not convince Li and Yu to change their minds, but they did get them to leave behind a substantial garrison force in Nanning in case of defeat.

Li and Yu's offensive was indeed quickly defeated. Zhang Yunyi led a mutiny that took control of the Nanning garrison, and led the majority of the army northwest to Baise. Yu Zuoyu and the rest of the army escorted the defeated generals southwest to Longzhou. Yu Zuobo went into exile, but Li Mingrui decided to join the Communists. Baise and Longzhou were chosen for their economic value: Baise was a center of the opium trade and Longzhou was an import customs post on the border with French Indochina. Over the next few months, the Communists were able to tax Baise's large opium industry to pay for recruiting new soldiers and expanding the peasant movement across a number of neighboring counties. The Communist leadership initially took a cautious approach to governance and presented themselves as part of the official United Front government instituted by Yu and Li. Historians Alexander Pantsov and Steven Levine argue that this was because the Zhuang peasant movement had been motivated by ethnic hatred of the Han, and it took the Communists time to appeal to them on the basis of class.

In November, the Communists in Baise received a letter from the Central Committee authorizing them to create a Guangxi Front Committee and openly seize power. On December 11, 1929 (the second anniversary of the Guangzhou Uprising), the Guangxi Front Committee proclaimed the creation of the Seventh Red Army and the You River Soviet (aka the Youjiang Soviet). Estimates of the initial strength of the Seventh Red Army range from 4,000 to 10,000 men. Zhang Yunyi was appointed overall commander and Wei Baqun was made commander of the third column. Because Deng had left to report to the Central Committee in person, his deputy Chen Haoren became the secretary of the Front Committee and leader of the Soviet. Diana Lary notes how this leadership cadre was dominated by outsiders, mainly of Han ethnicity. Wei, who had led the revolution in the You River valley for over a decade, was demoted to a subordinate commander.

=== Land reform ===
Land reform was one of the most important priorities of the You River Soviet. The Communists launched a propaganda drive in December 1929 urging peasants to rise up and redistribute the land of landlords and wealthy peasants. They plastered posters throughout Baise and sent cadres to the villages to distribute pamphlets and give speeches. In the spring of 1930, Deng Xiaoping, Wei Baqun, Chen Haoren, and Lei Jingtian (another Guangxi peasant revolutionary) met in Donglan to write a new land law for the You River Soviet. Formal ownership of all land was transferred to the Soviet, although most landholders were allowed to continue cultivating their land. Only the largest landowners and counterrevolutionaries had their land seized, and it, along with the land held by institutions, was divided up among the poor. Taxation was reduced and made progressive. These policies were likely influenced by Deng's experience in the Jiangxi Soviet. Some villages opted for collective management of land and even, in the case of Wei Baqun's home village, for collective farming.

=== Military confrontations and defeat ===
From December to February 1930, Deng Xiaoping returned to Shanghai to report to the Central Committee. The Committee endorsed the course that the Guangxi Front Committee had taken in Baise and ordered the agrarian revolution be continued. They directed Deng to reunite the forces that had occupied Longzhou with the main army in Baise, and to use this combined force to expand the You River Soviet northwards. The ultimate goal would be to link up with Mao Zedong in Jiangxi. Meanwhile, the soldiers in Longzhou had launched their own uprising, inspired by Baise. They formed the Eighth Red Army, and together with the Seventh Red Army in Baise, launched a pincer attack on Nanning. They expected the city to be weakly defended by the only recently re-established New Guangxi clique. However, the Seventh Red Army was defeated in a quick series of battles by their better-trained and armed opponents. Around the same time, Deng Xiaoping arrived in Longzhou and ordered the Eighth Red Army not to join the doomed attack. He led the army north towards Baise, but it was intercepted and destroyed. The remnants that reached their destination were absorbed into the Seventh Red Army.

In late summer, Deng once again made the trip to Shanghai to receive directions from the Central Committee. Director of the Propaganda Department Li Lisan had formulated an aggressive strategy of attacking cities to quick-start a nationwide revolution. Applied to Guangxi, the "Li Lisan Line" meant that the Red Army had to abandon the You River Soviet and liberate the cities of south China, starting with Liuzhou. Over objections from the other Guangxi Communists—especially Wei Baqun—Deng insisted on following this line. The army departed from Baise in September 1930 but failed to take Liuzhou. They decided to make for Mao Zedong in Jiangxi instead. This route took them through rough, mountainous terrain in winter. The Guangxi soldiers were unprepared for cold weather and casualties were high. Less than a third of the troops who set out made it to Jiangxi. When the army was close to Mao Zedong's base area, Deng Xiaoping went ahead to make contact. On the way back to his army he realized that it was under attack by Nationalist forces. Rather than going to take command, he sent a message to the army to fight their way through and left for Shanghai. Eventually, a portion of the army was able to join Mao and became part of the Red Army units there.

After the departure of the Seventh Red Army, the You River Soviet came under immediate attack by the New Guangxi clique. Wei Baqun again retreated to the mountains with his peasant forces, but he was eventually betrayed and executed.

== Legacy ==
Both at the time and later, Deng Xiaoping's leadership, and especially his decision to leave his army, have faced serious criticism. A Central Committee post-mortem in 1931 singled out his behavior as an example of "rightist opportunism and a rich peasant line". In 1945, a former commander of the Seventh Red Army spoke out against Deng for his actions during the uprising, although Mao Zedong protected Deng from any serious repercussions. During the Cultural Revolution, Red Guards uncovered these criticisms and accused Deng of desertion. Deng admitted that leaving the army was one of the "worst mistakes of [his] life" and that "although this action was allowed by the party, it was politically horribly wrong." Modern historians and biographers tend to agree. Uli Franz calls leaving the army a "serious error". Benjamin Yang calls the whole uprising a "tragic failure and dark period in [Deng's] political life." Diana Lary places blame for the uprising's failure more broadly on the "ineptitude" of both the local leaders and the CCP Central Committee.

== See also ==
- Outline of the Chinese Civil War

== Bibliography ==
- Yang, Benjamin (1997). Deng: A Political Biography. New York: M. E. Sharpe. ISBN 978-0-7656-3208-1.
- Goodman, David (1994). Deng Xiaoping and the Chinese Revolution: A Political Biography. New York: Routledge. ISBN 978-1-134-83121-0.
- Han, Xiaorong (2014). Red God: Wei Baqun and His Peasant Revolution in Southern China. Albany, New York: State University of New York Press. ISBN 978-1-4384-5385-9.
- Lary, Diana (1974). Region and Nation: the Kwangsi Clique in Chinese Politics, 1925-1937. New York: Cambridge University Press. ISBN 978-0-521-20204-6.
- Wilbur, C. Martin (1983). The nationalist revolution in China, 1923–1928. Cambridge University Press. ISBN 978-0-521-31864-8.
- Pantsov, Alexander V.; Levine, Steven I. (2015). Deng Xiaoping: A Revolutionary Life. New York: Oxford University Press. ISBN 978-0-19-939205-6.
- Franz, Uli (1988). Artin, Tom (ed.). Deng Xiaoping. New York: Harcourt Brace Jovanovich. ISBN 978-0-15-125177-3.
- Deng, Xiaoping (1968). "My Self-Criticism". Letter to the Central Committee of the Chinese Communist Party.
