= Longzhou Uprising =

Armed Chinese Communist Party uprising

- Part of Chinese Civil War
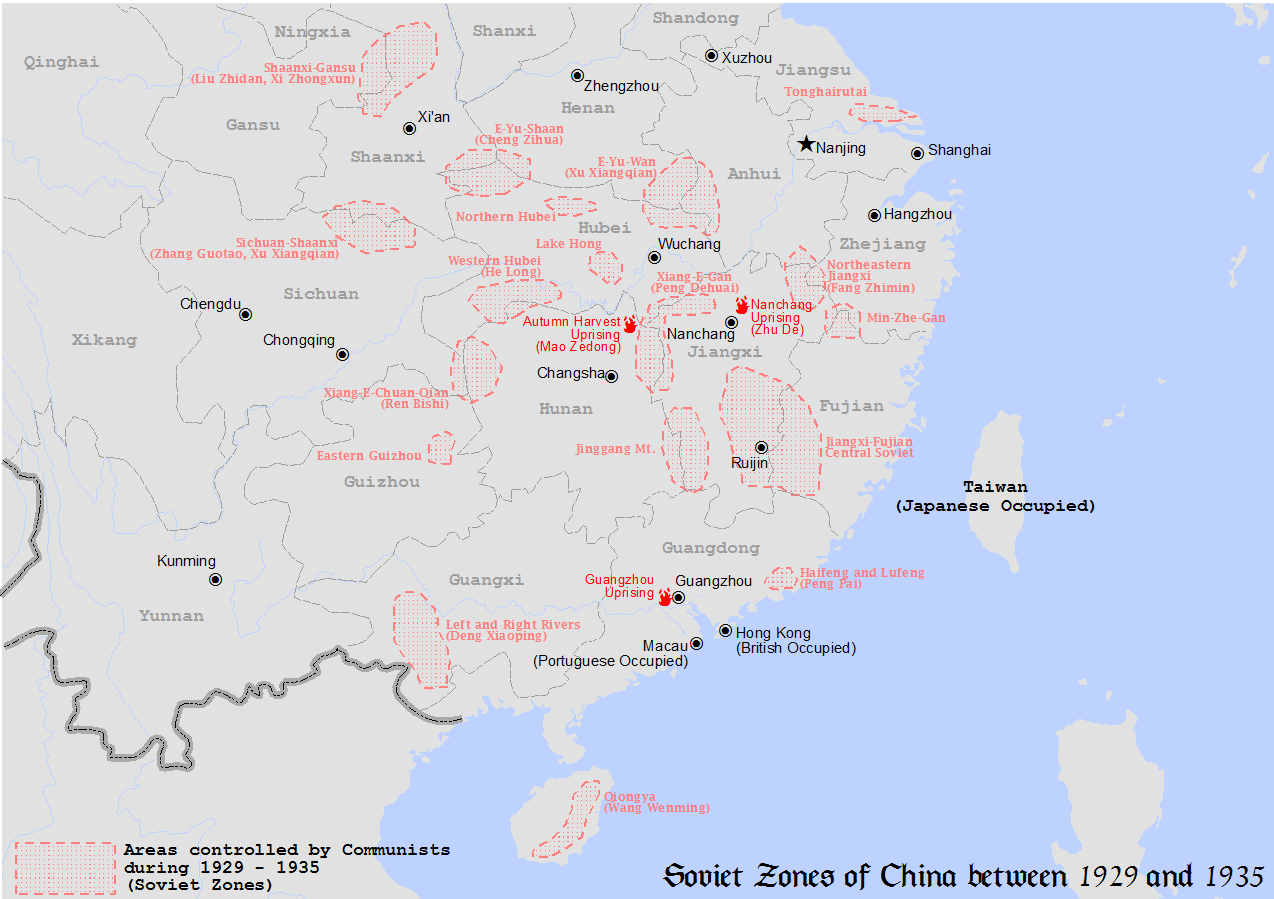
- The Longzhou Uprising, labelled as the "Left River" Uprising
Date	February–April, 1930
Location	Guangxi
Result	Defeated, survivors joined the You River Soviet

Belligerents
New Guangxi clique Nanjing government: National Revolutionary Army	Chinese Soviet Republic: Chinese Red Army

Commanders and leaders
Li Zongren	Yu Zuoyu; Li Mingrui; Deng Xiaoping

Longzhou Uprising
- Traditional Chinese: 龍州起義
- Simplified Chinese: 龙州起义
Transcriptions
Standard Mandarin
- Hanyu Pinyin: Lóngzhōu qǐyì

The Longzhou Uprising was an armed Chinese Communist Party uprising during the early years of the Chinese Civil War that took place in Longzhou County, Guangxi. Following on the heels of the Baise Uprising that had created the You River Soviet to its north, the uprising began on 2 February 1930, and established the Zuo River Soviet in eight counties of southwest Guangxi. It was led by the Guangxi Front Committee of the Chinese Communist Party (CCP), including Li Mingrui and Deng Xiaoping. Its military forces were organized into the Eighth Red Army under Yu Zuoyu (俞作豫). The uprising was suppressed within only a few months by the Nationalist Army with help from French bombers operating out of French Indochina. The survivors joined the You River Soviet.

== Events ==
The Longzhou Uprising began on 1 February 1930. Like the Baise Uprising, it was quickly successful, perhaps with the assistance of Vietnamese Communists operating just across the border. Yu Zuoyu was made commander of the Eighth Red Army and Deng Xiaoping served as the political commissar. Li Mingrui was commander-in-chief over both the Seventh (organized in the Baise Uprising) and Eighth Armies. They established the Zuo River Soviet over eight counties along the Zuo River (because Zuo means "left", it is sometimes known as the "Left River Soviet"). The Seventh and Eighth Red Armies immediately marched on Nanning to take advantage of the conflict between Guangxi warlord Li Zongren and the Nationalist Government. However, that conflict ended quickly, and Li was able to bring his army around in time to engage the revolutionaries. The CCP fought fiercely but were no match for the experienced warlord troops.

Although he was the political commissar of both the Zuo and You River Soviets, Deng Xiaoping had actually been in Shanghai at the beginning of the uprising to tend to his pregnant wife Zhang Xiyuan, who died in childbirth that January. On 7 February, Deng returned to Longzhou. He telegraphed the Seventh Red Army to stop attacking Nanning and ordered the Eighth Red Army to withdraw to Longzhou. He then departed to the You River Soviet to help conduct the Communists' land reform there. In mid-March, Li Zongren sent more than 4,000 troops to attack Longzhou along two routes. The French colonial government in Tonkin, angered by the CCP's attacks on the Catholic Mission and French consulate in what they considered the French sphere of influence, assisted Li with bombing sorties. The Eighth Red Army was quickly defeated and forced to retreat north to join the Seventh Red Army in the You River Soviet.

== See also ==
- Outline of the Chinese Civil War
