= 安州 =

安州 may refer to:

- Anju, South Pyongan, a city of South Pyongan province, North Korea
- Anzhou (disambiguation), the Chinese pinyin transliteration
- Awa Province (Chiba), abbreviated form name Anshū (安州), a province of Japan in the area of modern Chiba Prefecture
