= Qinzhou (disambiguation) =

Qinzhou (钦州) is a prefecture-level city in Guangxi, China.

Qinzhou may also refer to:

- Qinzhou District (秦州区), a district in Tianshui, Gansu, China
- Qín Prefecture (秦州), a prefecture between the 3rd and 20th centuries in modern Gansu, China
- Qīn Prefecture (欽州), a prefecture between the 6th and 20th centuries in modern Guangxi, China
