= Wei Baqun =

Chinese peasant revolutionary (1894–1932)

- 韦拔群
- 1958 posthumous portrait of Wei Baqun
- Born: 6 February 1894; Donglan, Guangxi, Qing China
- Died: 18 October 1932 (aged 38); Donglan, Guangxi, Republic of China (present-day Bama, Guangxi, China)
- Military career
- Allegiance: National Protection Army; Chinese Red Army
- Conflicts: National Protection War; Chinese Civil War

Chinese name
- Simplified Chinese: 韦拔群
- Traditional Chinese: 韋拔群
Transcriptions
Standard Mandarin
- Hanyu Pinyin: Wéi Báqún
Yue: Cantonese
- Jyutping: Wai5 Bat6-kwan4

Zhuang name
- Zhuang: Veiz Bazginz

Wei Baqun (Chinese: 韦拔群; pinyin: Wéi Báqún; Zhuang: Veiz Bazginz; 6 February 1894 – 18 October 1932) was a Chinese revolutionary and military officer. He was a senior general in the Chinese Workers' and Peasants' Red Army and one of the leaders of the 1929 Baise Uprising.

== Early life ==
Born on 6 February 1894 into an ethnic Zhuang family who were the wealthiest local landlords in Donglan County, Hechi, in Guangxi, Wei studied at Guangxi Legal and Political Academy in his early years. In late 1914, he left his family at the age 20 and except for a brief visit in late 1915 to early 1916, he did not return to his family until the end of 1921.

== Revolutionary career ==
In early 1916, Wei Baqun joined the National Protection Army to resist Yuan Shikai's forces in Guizhou, actively participating in the National Protection War. He later enrolled in the Guizhou Military Academy and, after graduating, became a staff officer in the Guizhou Army.

Inspired by the May Fourth Movement in 1919, Wei left the Guizhou Army in 1920 and joined the Comrades Association for the Reformation of Guangxi in Guangzhou. He later became a member of the Kuomintang (KMT) and led a local uprising against corruption, warlord rule, and elite exploitation. Though initially gaining popularity in Donglan, the rebellion was suppressed, forcing Wei to flee. He spent several years in Guangzhou, where he encountered Chinese Communist Party (CCP) members who were collaborating with the KMT under the First United Front. Both parties sought to overthrow warlords and were organizing peasant associations in southern China. Wei attended classes at the Peasant Movement Training Institute and visited CCP-led peasant organizations near Guangzhou. Though deeply influenced by communist ideals, he did not immediately join the CCP.

In 1925, Wei returned to Donglan as the KMT's special agent to establish peasant associations in Guangxi. He quickly reestablished contact with his supporters and they began the process of rebuilding the peasants' movement along the model of the organizations Wei had witnessed in Guangdong. They implemented policies such as tax reductions, crackdowns on banditry, and the abolition of rent and debt collection, leading to widespread support. By September 1925, membership in Donglan's peasant associations had reached 20,000, surging to 80,000 by late 1926, the highest in Guangxi.

However, the movement alarmed the KMT's conservative faction, particularly the warlord-led New Guangxi clique, which controlled the region. In February 1926, Governor Huang Shaohong deployed troops to suppress the peasant movement, resulting in a brutal massacre of its leaders. Due to pressure from the KMT's left-wing, the troops eventually withdrew, allowing Wei to survive by retreating into the mountains.

=== Baise Uprising ===
By 1929, the Northern Expedition had reunified China under the KMT, but internal divisions arose between the left-wing, which sought to maintain the United Front with the CCP, and the right-wing, which viewed communists as a threat. Eventually, Chiang Kai-shek defeated Wang Jingwei's left-wing faction and launched a violent crackdown on the CCP. In response, the communists went underground, focusing on establishing rural soviets. That same year, Guangxi warlords revolted against Chiang, but he quelled the uprising by bribing two of their generals, Li Mingrui and Yu Zuobo, to betray their leaders. However, unbeknownst to Chiang, both generals were left-wing Nationalists who reinstated United Front policies, allowing the CCP to expand its influence. Later in 1929, Deng Xiaoping arrived in Guangxi as the CCP's representative. During this period, Wei Baqun formally joined the CCP.

In November 1929, the Communist leadership in Baise authorized the creation of a Guangxi Front Committee, formally seizing control of the region. On 11 December 1929, marking the second anniversary of the Guangzhou Uprising, they established the Seventh Red Army of the Chinese Workers' and Peasants' Red Army and the You River Soviet (Youjiang Soviet). The army's initial strength ranged between 4,000 and 10,000 troops. Zhang Yunyi was appointed overall commander, with Wei Baqun leading the third column. With Deng Xiaoping leaving to report to the CCP Central Committee, his deputy, Chen Haoren, assumed leadership of the Front Committee and the Soviet. Historian Diana Lary notes that the Soviet's leadership was dominated by outsiders, primarily Han Chinese, relegating Wei—despite his decade-long leadership in the You River Valley—to a subordinate role. Wei led the pre-existing movement of Zhuang and focused on land redistribution in the area it controlled during the uprising. After a brief but costly attempt to capture Guangxi's major cities, the soviet and uprising was suppressed and surviving soldiers made their way to Jiangxi.

In October 1930, the Red 7th Army regrouped in Hechi, Guangxi, reorganizing into three divisions. Wei was appointed commander of the 21st Division, tasked with defending the You River Soviet. Demonstrating commitment to the broader revolution, Wei transferred 1,000 of his best troops to the two main divisions preparing for an expedition towards the communist base in Jiangxi. After their departure, he returned to You River Soviet with just over 100 men, continuing the struggle. He rebuilt the 21st Division by incorporating local militias from Donglan, Fengshan, and Du'an counties, expanding it into four regiments and two independent battalions, forming a solid resistance force.

=== Final years ===
Between spring and November 1931, the You River Soviet faced two large-scale KMT encirclement and suppression campaigns, led by Bai Chongxi. Despite harsh conditions, Wei effectively led guerrilla warfare, repelling Nationalist forces.

By August 1932, Bai Chongxi personally led 10,000 troops, supported by local militias, in a siege on Xishan, Donglan County, the heart of the You River Soviet. On 19 October 1932, Wei Baqun was betrayed and assassinated by his nephew at a cave in Donglan, Guangxi (in present-day Bama Yao Autonomous County in Guangxi). He was 38 years old. After photographs were taken of Wei's head and it was treated with preservatives, it was then taken to Nanning, where it was put on public display. 17 of Wei's 24 family members, including his wife and children, were killed as a result of his revolutionary activities.

After the founding of the People's Republic of China in 1949, Wei's body along with his head were recovered and are buried together at the Martyrs' Cemetery in Donglan County.

== Legacy ==
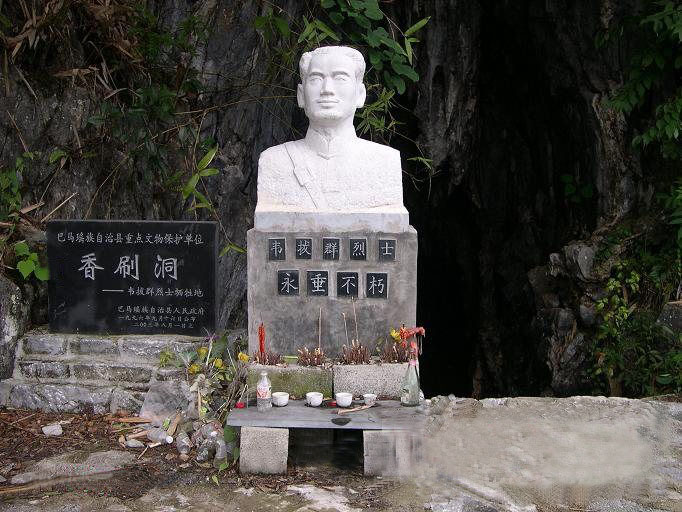
Bust of Wei in Donglan County

Wei's nephew was murdered in unknown circumstances in Hechi after moving there from Liuzhou in early 1939 to take refugee from Japanese aerial bombardment of Liuzhou during the Second Sino-Japanese War. In the early 1960s, two of the conspirators who were involved in the murder of Wei Baqun were arrested by local authorities. After being sentenced to death and while waiting for approval from the Supreme People's Court, both of them died in the Donglan County Detention Center due to serious illness.

In the official historiography of the Chinese Communist Party, along with Mao Zedong and Peng Pai, Wei is considered as one of the great early peasant movement leaders of the Chinese Communist Party. In Guangxi, a memorial hall honoring Wei is located in Donglan County. Deng Xiaoping once wrote an inscription for Wei Baqun stating "Comrade Wei Baqun devoted his entire life to the cause of the Party and the people, and finally sacrificed his life. He is worthy of being a hero of the proletariat and the working people, a leader of the masses, and a model Communist Party member!" Mao Zedong stated that Wei was a "good son of the Zhuang people, a good leader of the peasants and a good cadre of the Party." In a 1979 movie about the life of Wei, he was portrayed by actor Ma Changyu.

In 2009, Wei Baqun was named one of the 100 heroes and role models who contributed to the founding of New China.

== Bibliography ==
- Goodman, David (1994). Deng Xiaoping and the Chinese Revolution: A Political Biography. New York: Routledge. ISBN 978-1-134-83121-0.
- Han, Xiaorong (2014). Red God: Wei Baqun and His Peasant Revolution in Southern China. Albany, New York: State University of New York Press. ISBN 978-1-4384-5385-9.
- Lary, Diana (1974). Region and Nation: the Kwangsi Clique in Chinese Politics, 1925-1937. New York: Cambridge University Press. ISBN 978-0-521-20204-6.
- Pantsov, Alexander V.; Levine, Steven I. (2015). Deng Xiaoping: A Revolutionary Life. New York: Oxford University Press. ISBN 978-0-19-939205-6.
- Wilbur, C. Martin (1983). The nationalist revolution in China, 1923–1928. Cambridge University Press. ISBN 978-0-521-31864-8.
- Yang, Benjamin (1997). Deng: A Political Biography. New York: M. E. Sharpe. ISBN 978-0-7656-3208-1.
