= Anzhou =

Anzhou may refer to:

- Anzhou Subdistrict, a subdistrict in Xianju County, Zhejiang, China
- Anzhou, Hebei, a town in Anxin County, Hebei, China

== Historical prefectures ==
- An Prefecture, a prefecture between the 6th and 12th centuries in modern Hubei, China
- An Prefecture (Guangxi), a prefecture in the 6th century in modern Guangxi, China

== See also ==
- Yên Châu (Vietnamese equivalent)
