= Gongyuanqian station =

Guangzhou Metro interchange station

Coordinates: 23.12543°N 113.26420°E

Gongyuanqian 公园前
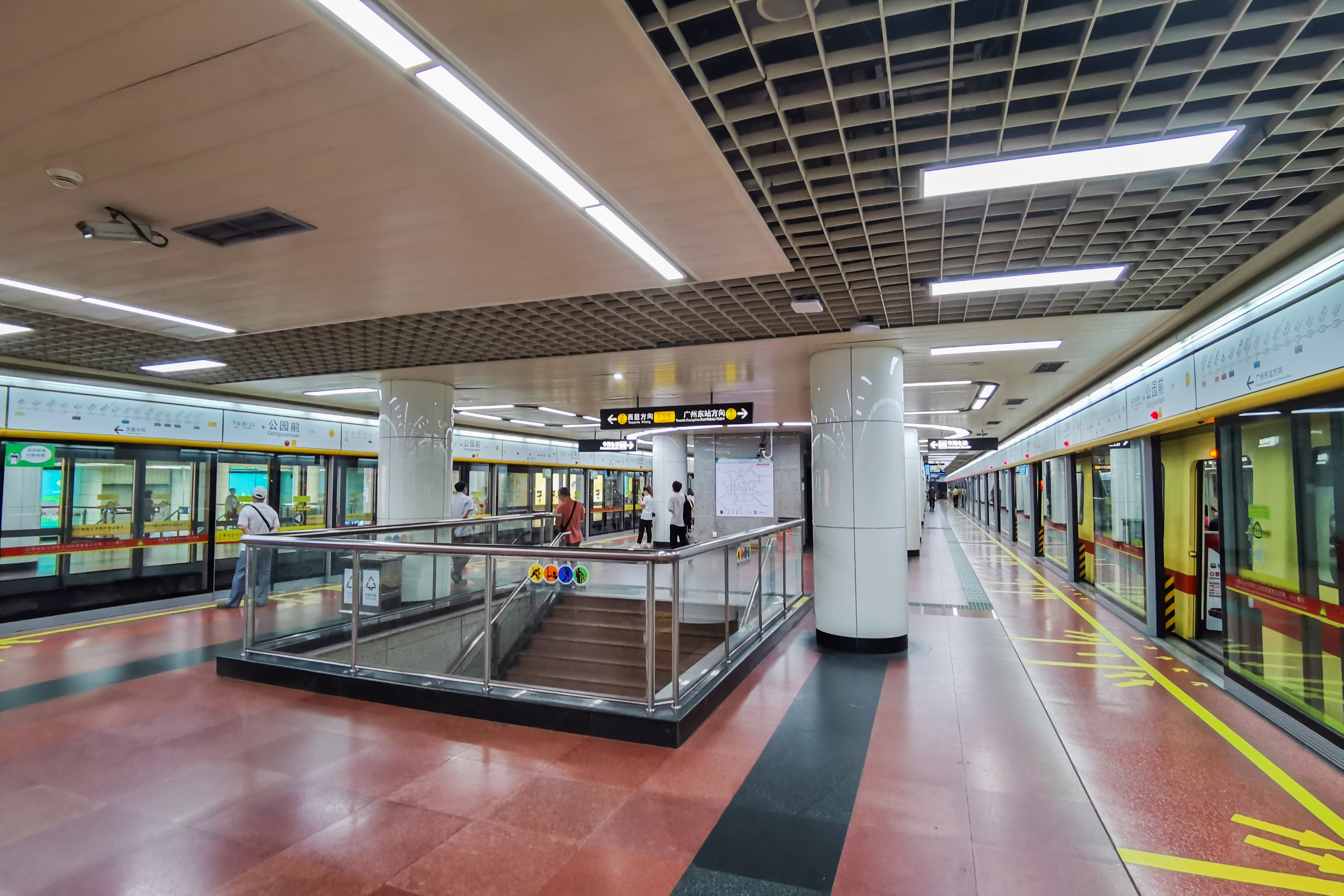
- Line 1 island platform

Chinese name
- Simplified Chinese: 公园前站
- Traditional Chinese: 公園前站
- Literal meaning: Park Front station
Transcriptions
Standard Mandarin
- Hanyu Pinyin: Gōngyuánqián Zhàn
Yue: Cantonese
- Jyutping: gung^{1}jyun^{2}cin^{4} zaam^{6}

General information
- Location: Zhongshan No. 5 Road and Qiyi Road (起义路); Yuexiu District, Guangzhou, Guangdong; China
- Operated by: Guangzhou Metro Co. Ltd.
- Lines: Line 1; Line 2
- Platforms: 8 (2 island platforms and 4 side platforms)
- Tracks: 4

Construction
- Structure type: Underground
- Accessible: Yes

Other information
- Station code: 109 213

History
- Opened: 16 February 1999; 27 years ago (Line 1); 29 December 2002; 23 years ago (Line 2)

Services
Preceding station	Guangzhou Metro	Following station
Ximenkou towards Xilang	Line 1	Peasant Movement Institute towards Guangzhou East Railway Station
Haizhu Square towards Guangzhou South Railway Station	Line 2	Sun Yat-sen Memorial Hall towards Jiahewanggang
Location

Gongyuanqian Station (simplified Chinese: 公园前站; traditional Chinese: 公園前站; Jyutping: gung1 jyun2 cin4 zaam6; Cantonese Yale: Gūng'yúnchìhn Jaahm; lit. 'Front of the Park Station') is an interchange station between Line 1 and Line 2 of the Guangzhou Metro. It started operation on 28 June 1999 and is located under People's Park in Yuexiu District of Guangzhou.

== Station layout ==
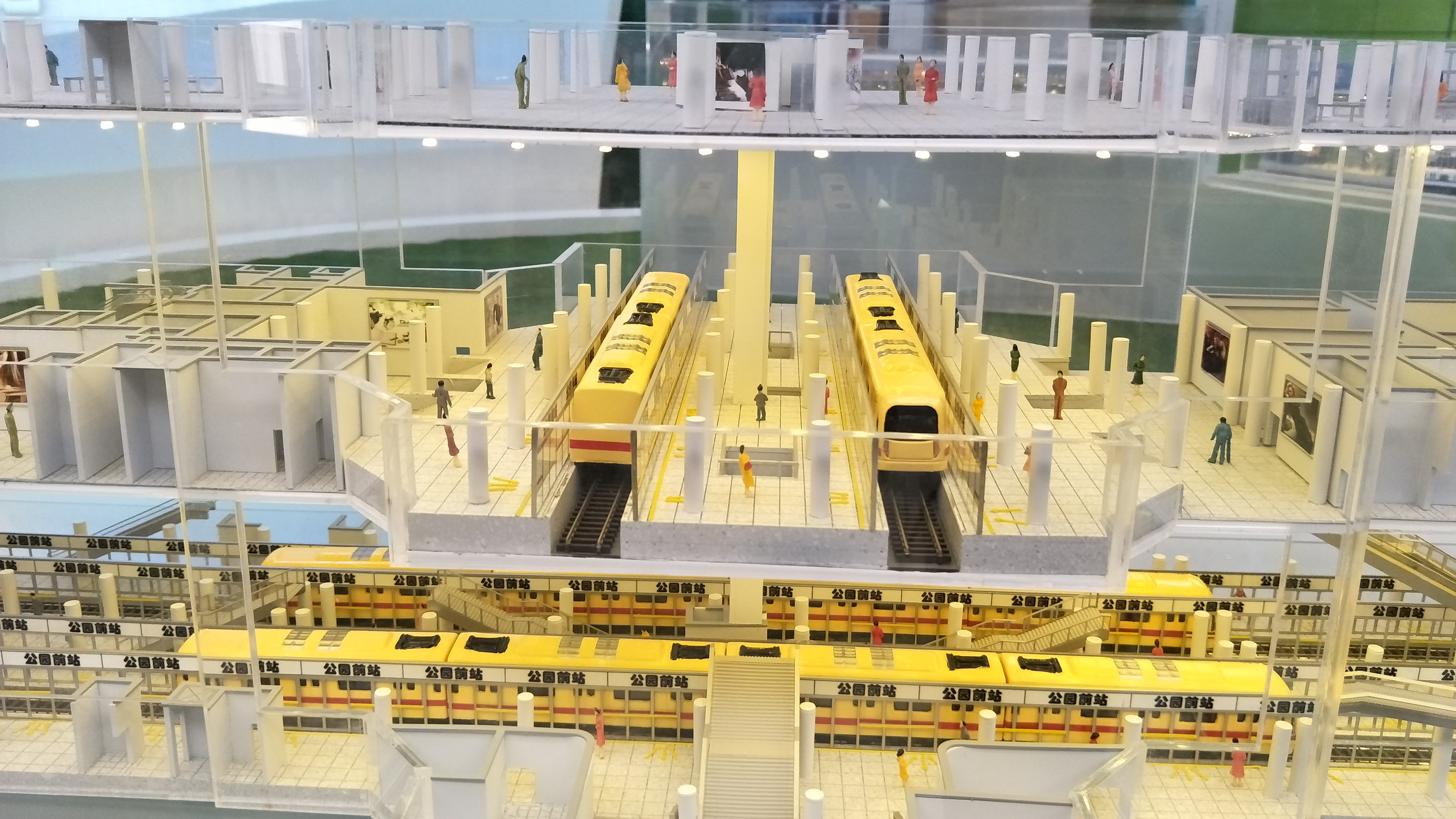
Scale model of Gongyuanqian Station at the Guangzhou Metro Museum, showing the perpendicular Spanish Solution interchange.

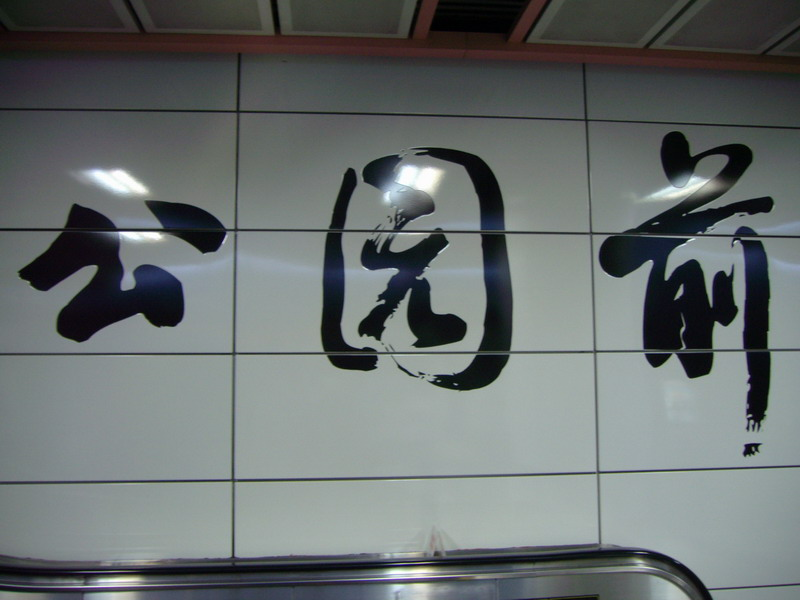
the calligraphy display on the Chinese characters of Gongyuangqian Station

Due to being an interchange between two busy lines and serving a major office and shopping district, it's one of the busiest stations of the Guangzhou Metro. Both the line 1 and line 2 stations adopt the Spanish solution to separate boarding and alighting passengers on both lines. When the train arrives at the platform, train doors and platform screen doors on the right side are opened first to allow passengers to get off. Then those on the left side are opened to allow passengers to get on.

L1; Concourse	Lobby	Ticket Machines, Customer Service, Shops, Police Station, Baby Change, Safety Facilities
L2; Platforms
L2; Platforms	Side platform, doors will open on the right
L2; Platforms	Platform 4 ↑ Platform 2 ↓	1 towards Xilang (Ximenkou)
L2; Platforms	Island platform, doors will open on the left
L2; Platforms	Platform 1 ↑ Platform 3 ↓	1 towards Guangzhou East Railway Station (Peasant Movement Institute)
L2; Platforms	Side platform, doors will open on the right
L3; Platforms
L3; Platforms	Side platform, doors will open on the right
L3; Platforms	Platform 8 ↑ Platform 6 ↓	2 towards Guangzhou South Railway Station (Haizhu Square)
L3; Platforms	Island platform, doors will open on the left
L3; Platforms	Platform 5 ↑ Platform 7 ↓	2 towards Jiahewanggang (Sun Yat-sen Memorial Hall)
L3; Platforms	Side platform, doors will open on the right

== Exits ==
The station has 12 exits, lettered A, B, C, D, E, F, G, H, I (I1, I2), J and K.

== Gallery ==
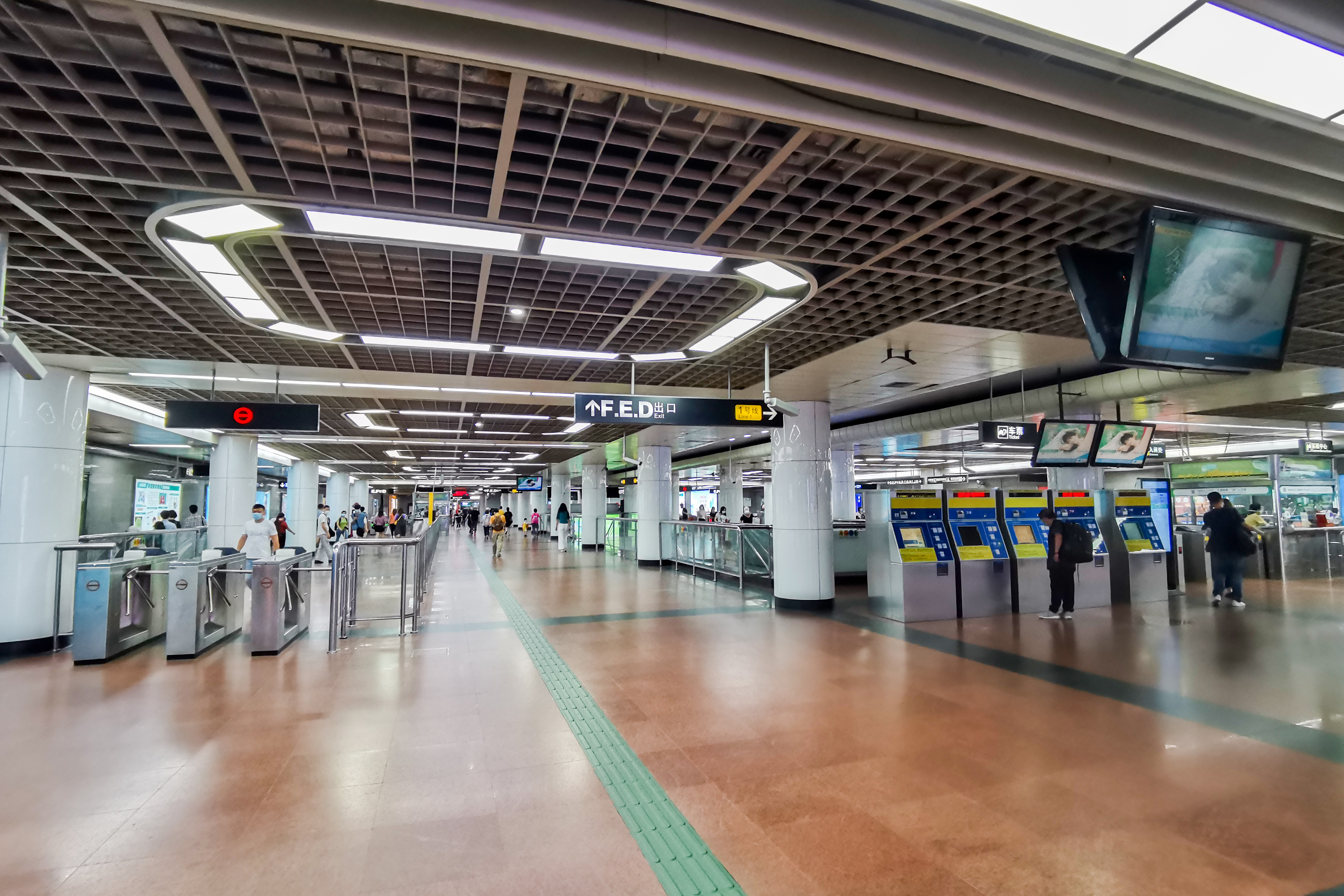
Main concourse between both lines looking east

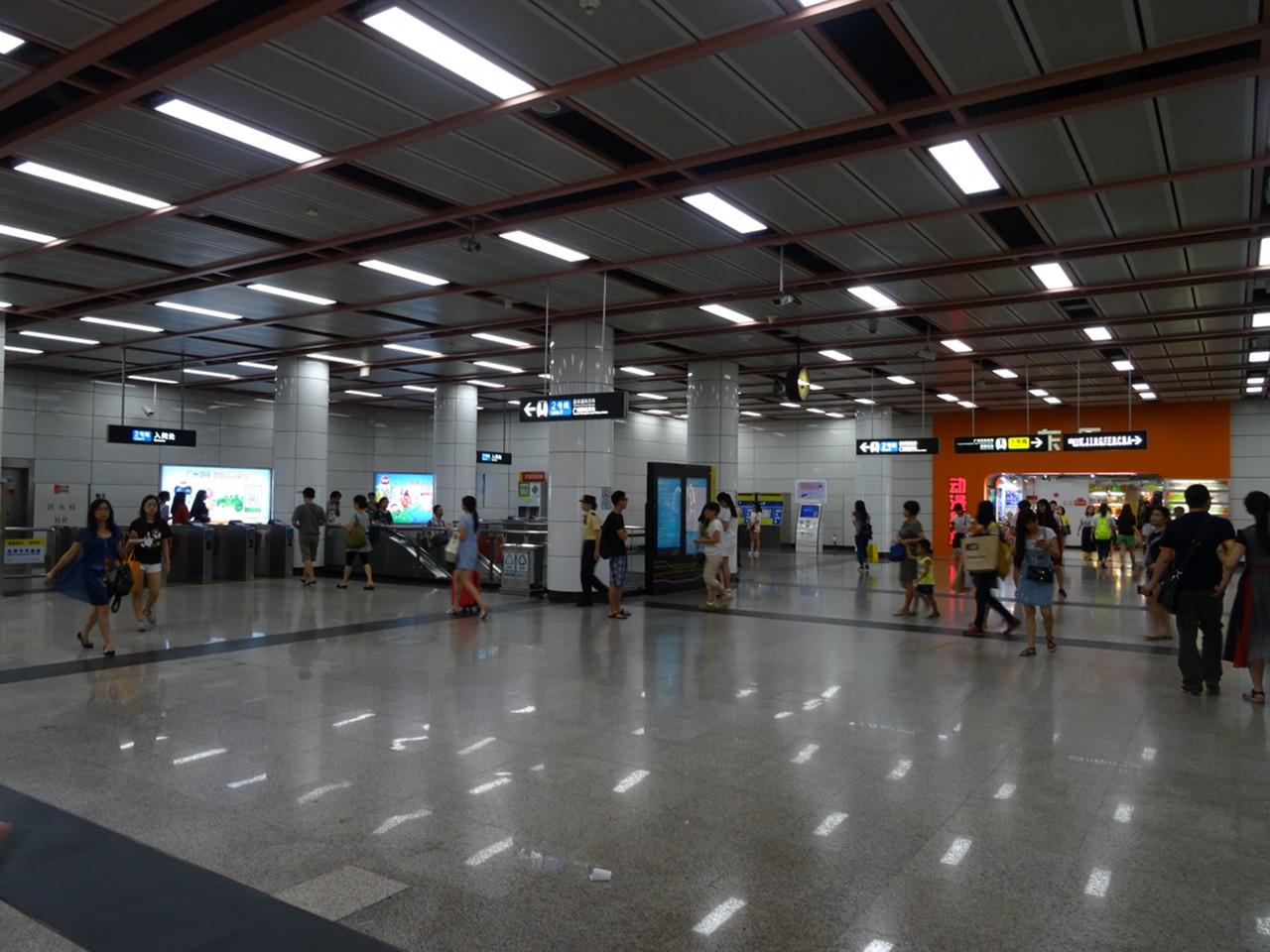
Line 2 north concourse

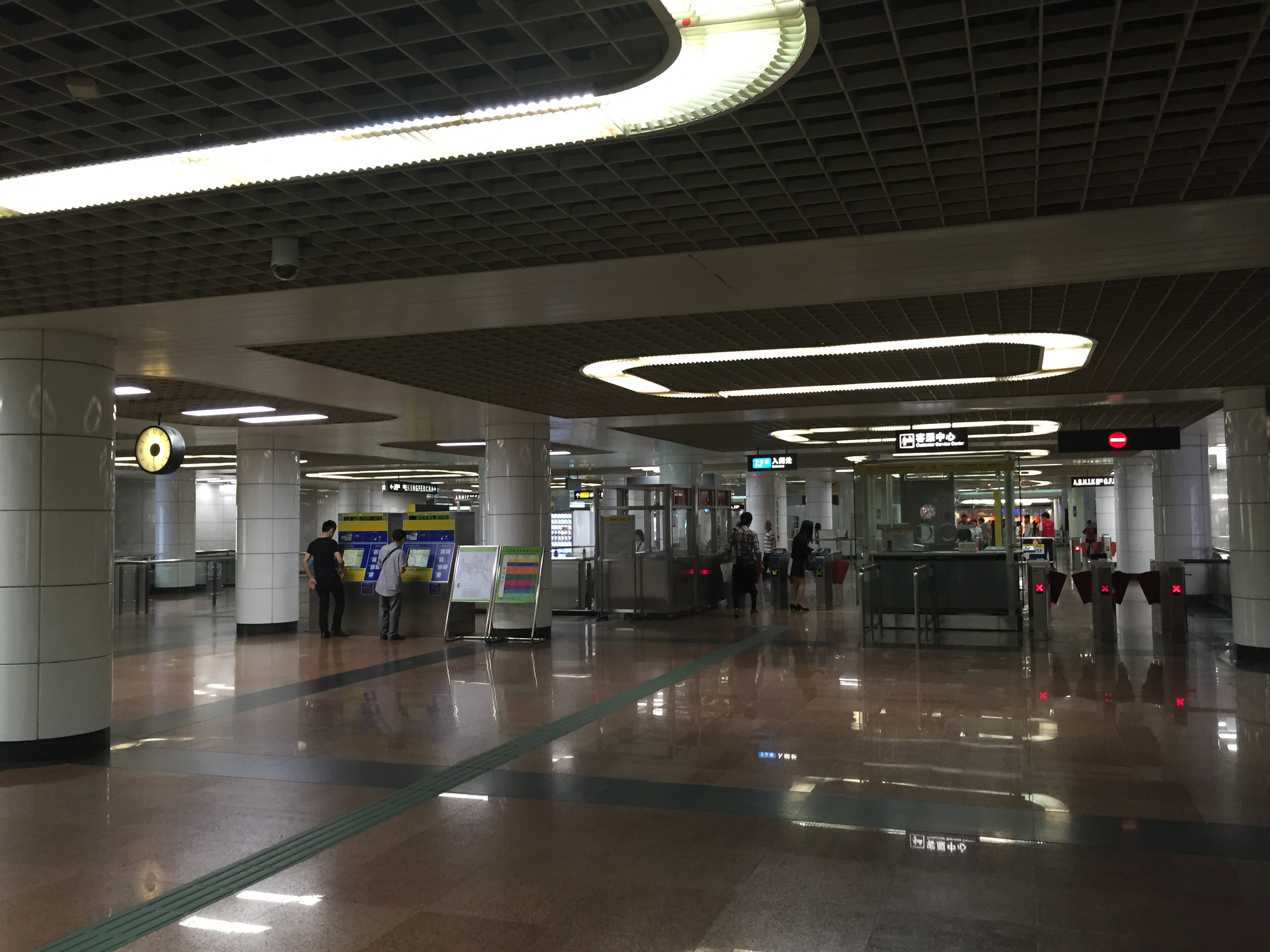
Main concourse looking south

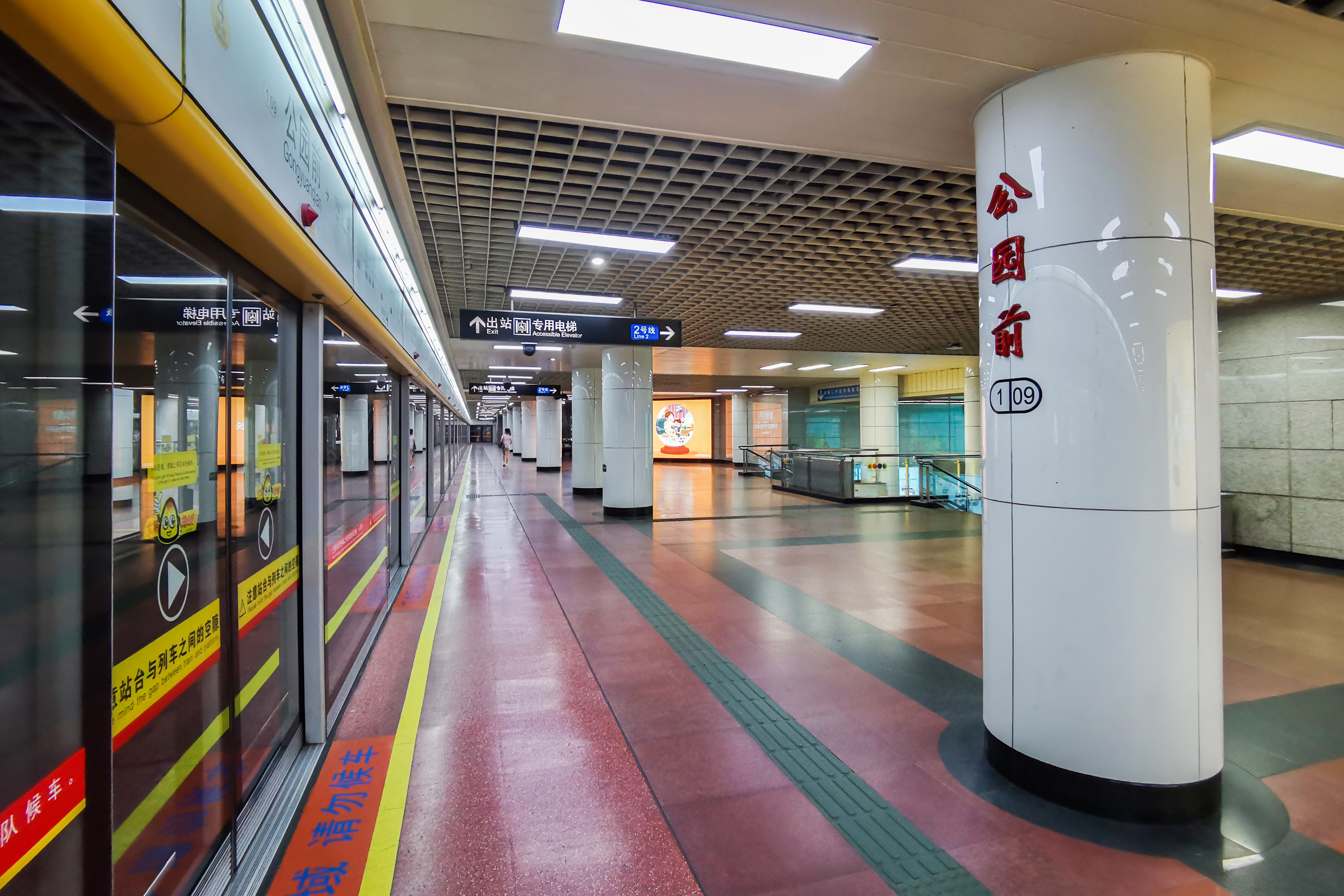
Platform 4 (Line 1 towards Xilang alighting platform)

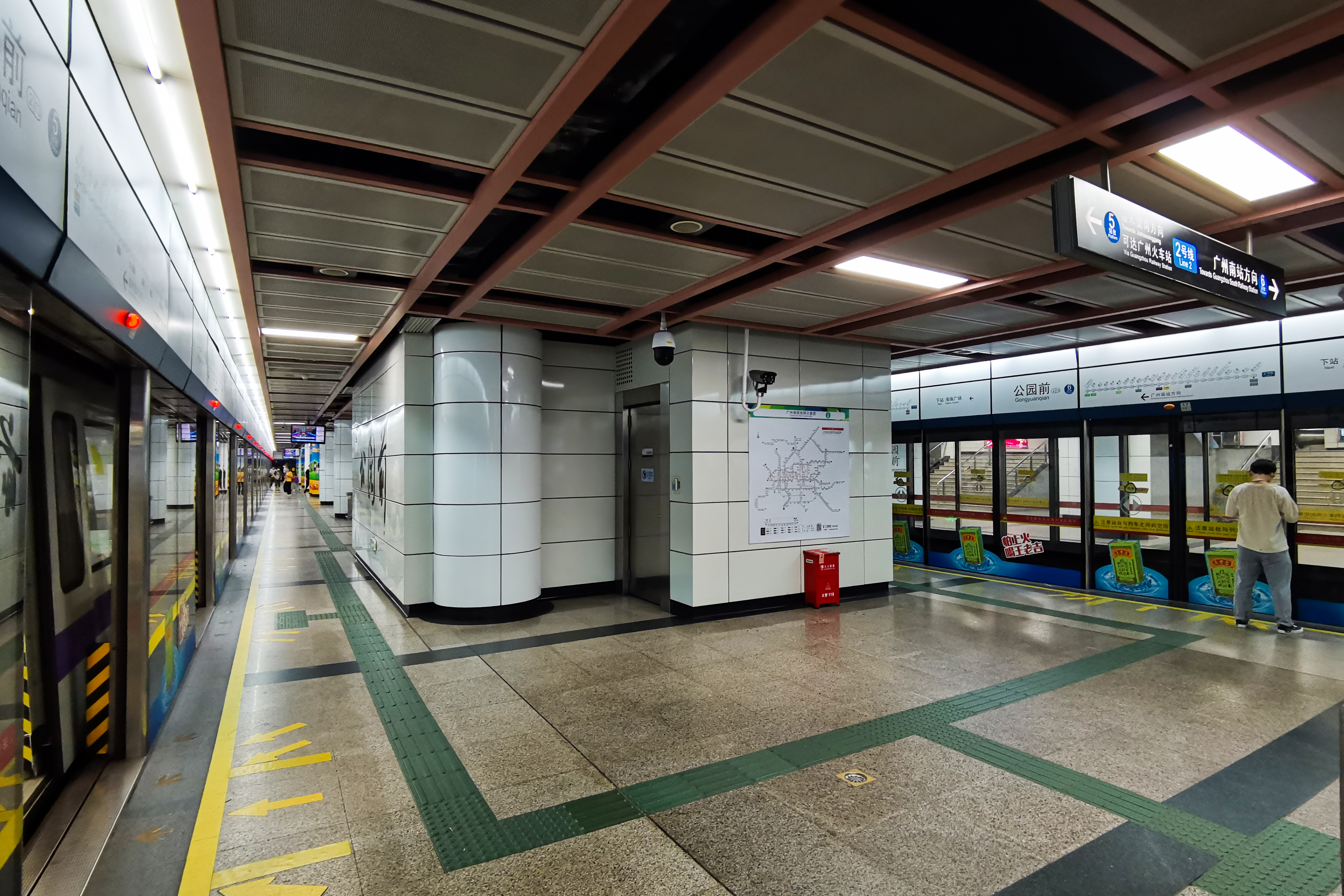
Line 2 island platform

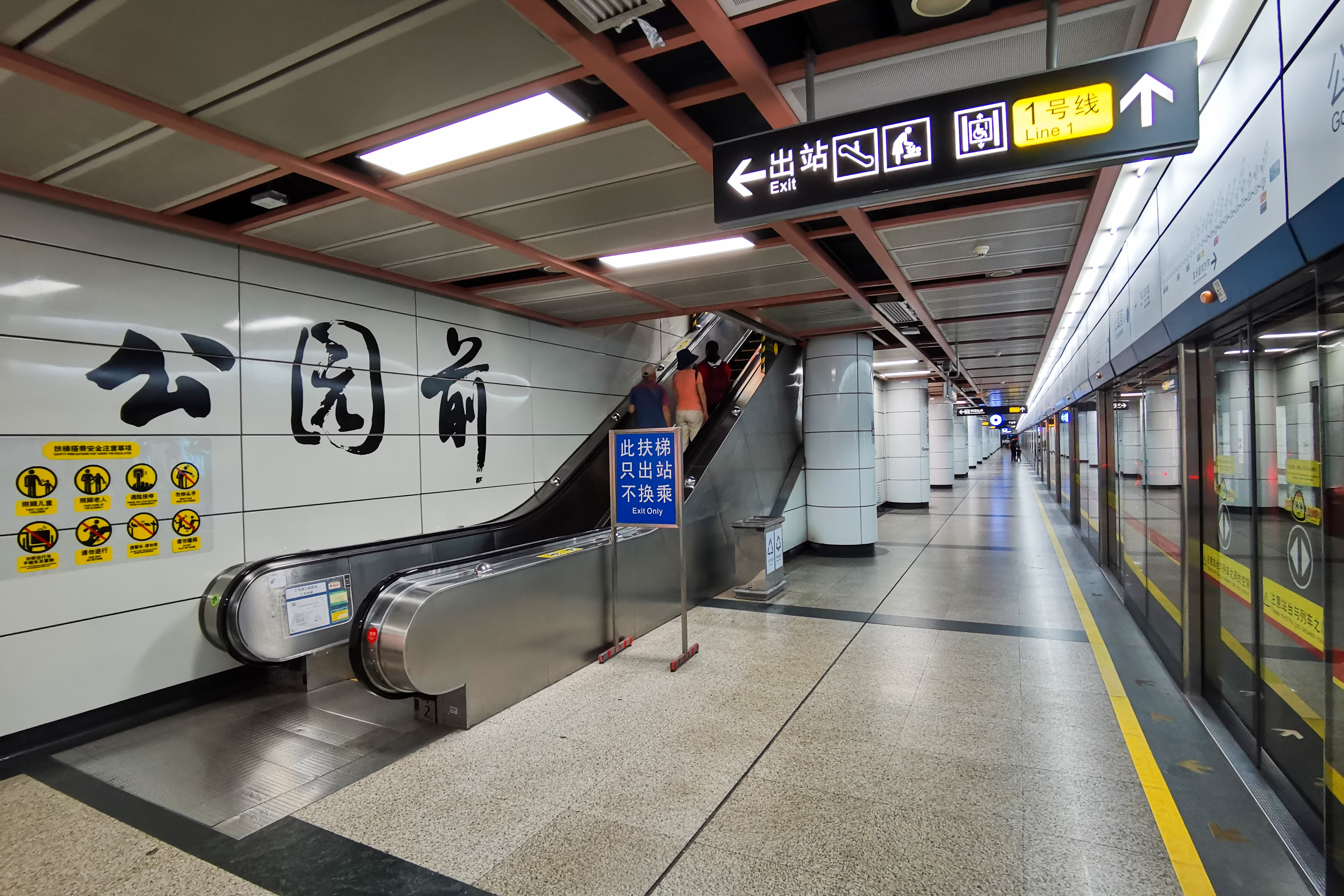
Platform 7 (Line 2 towards Jiahewanggang alighting platform)

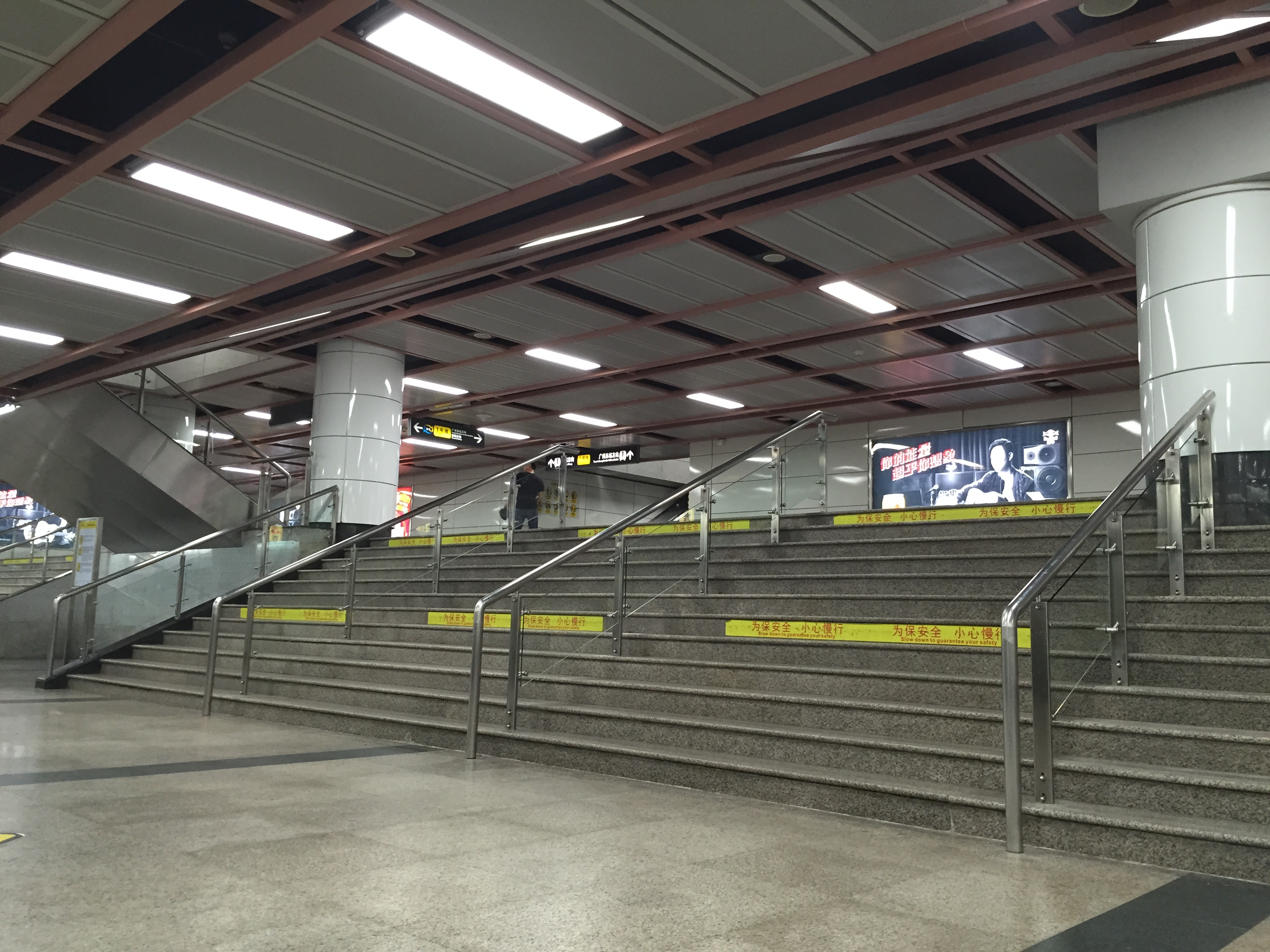
Transfer stairs to Line 1 in the middle of Line 2 Platform 7

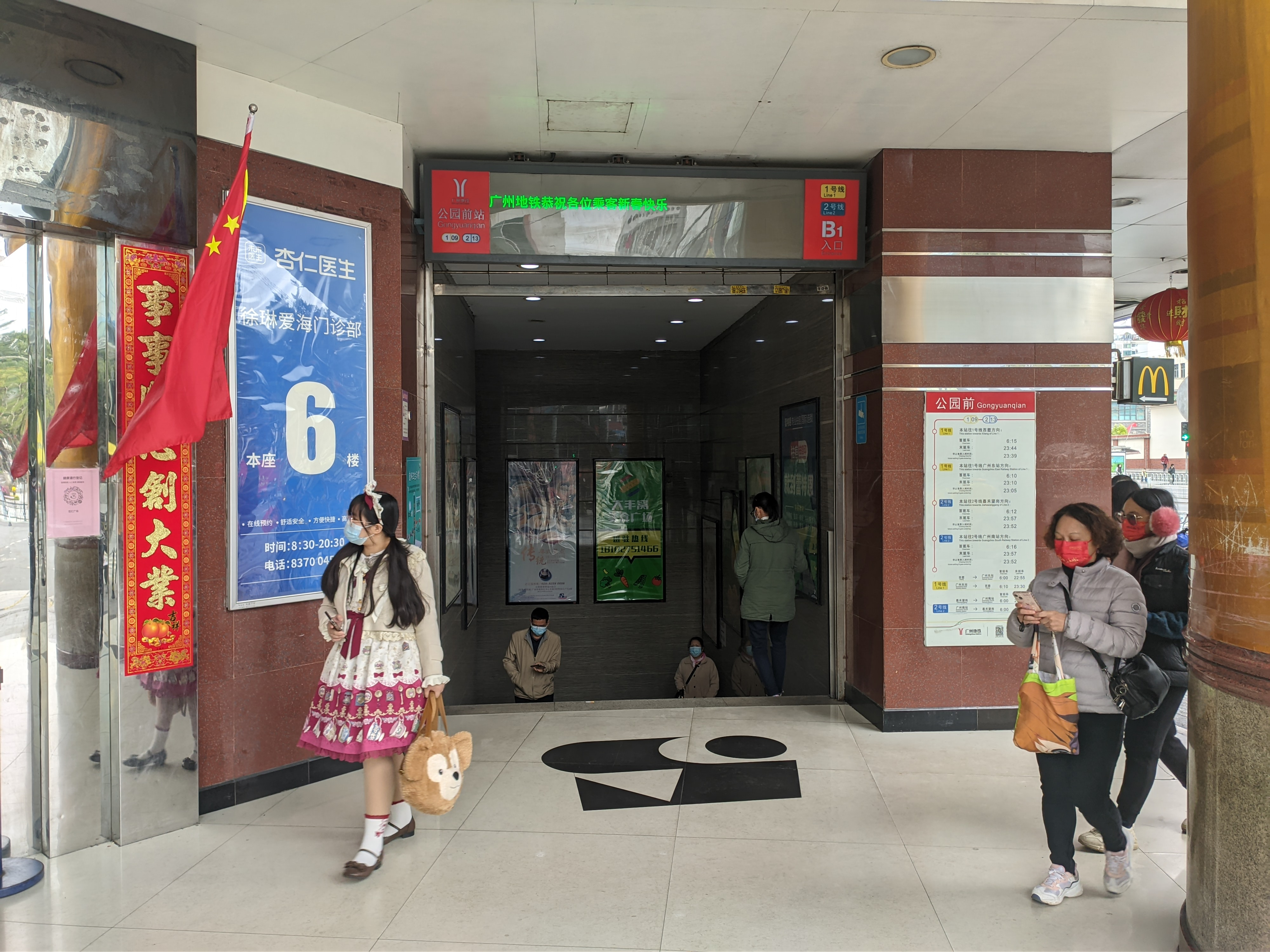
Exit B1

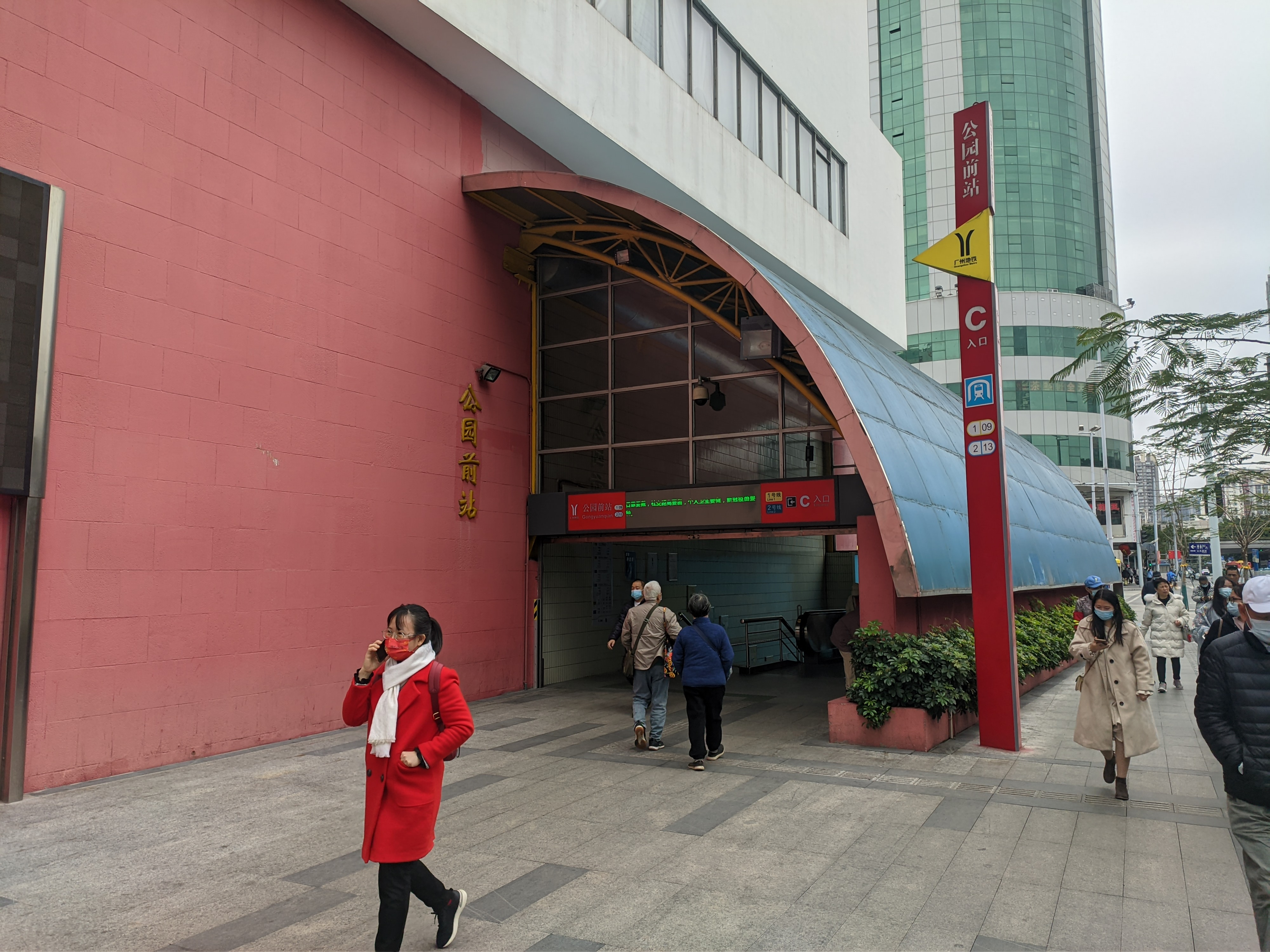
Exit C

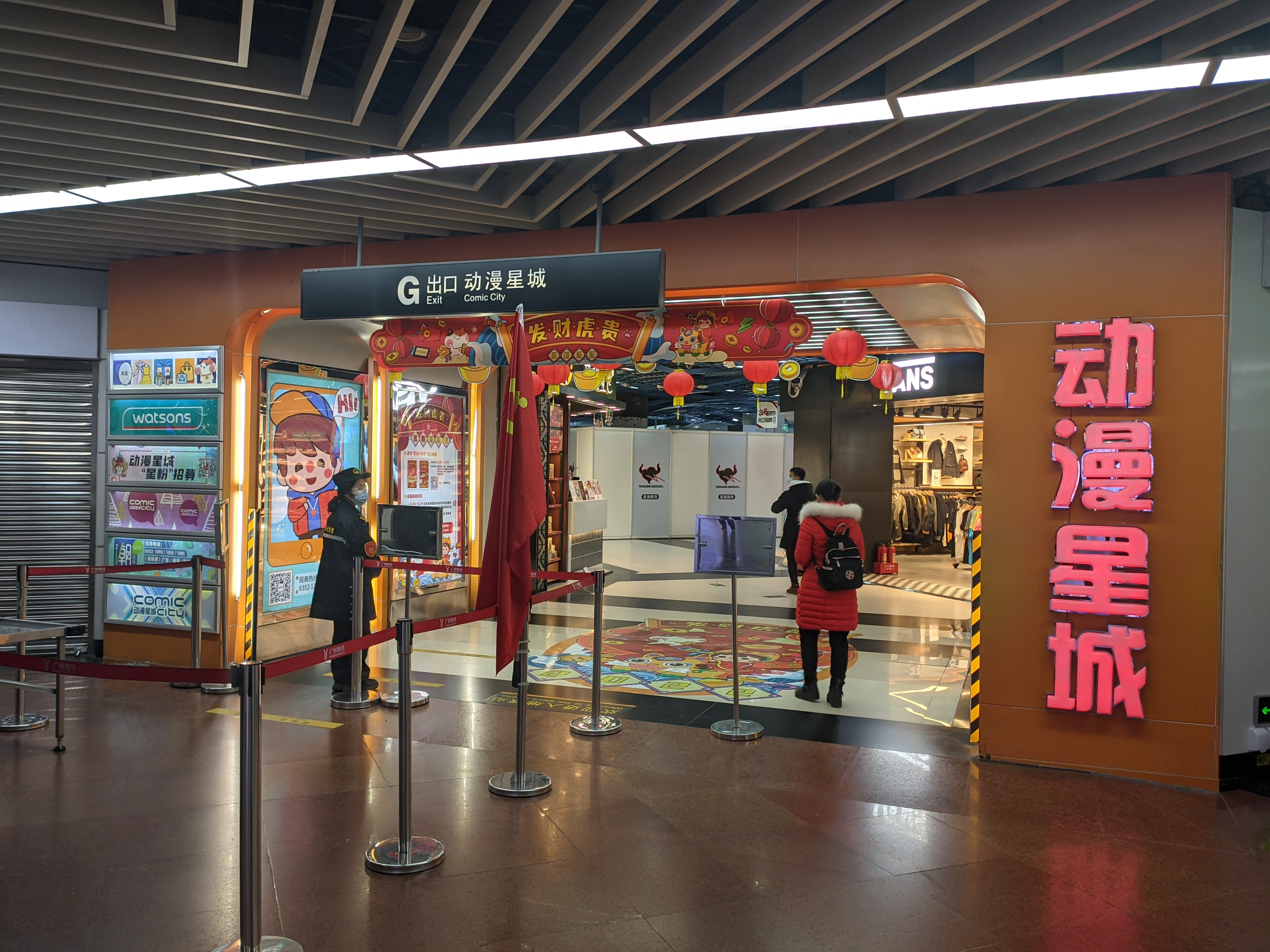
Exit G

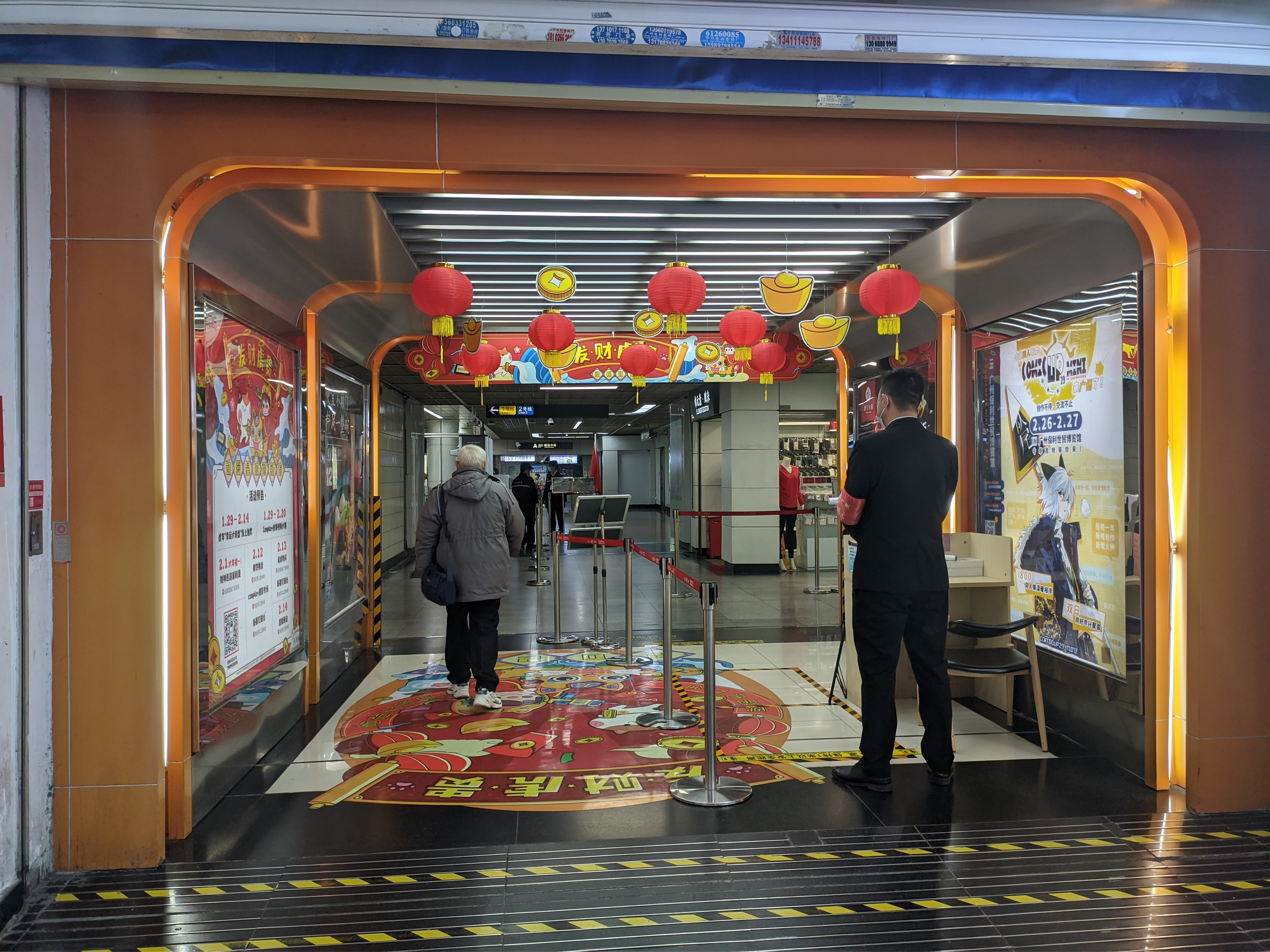
Exit I1
