= Peasant Movement Institute station =

Guangzhou Metro station

Coordinates: 23°07′36″N 113°16′32″E

Peasant Movement Institute 农讲所
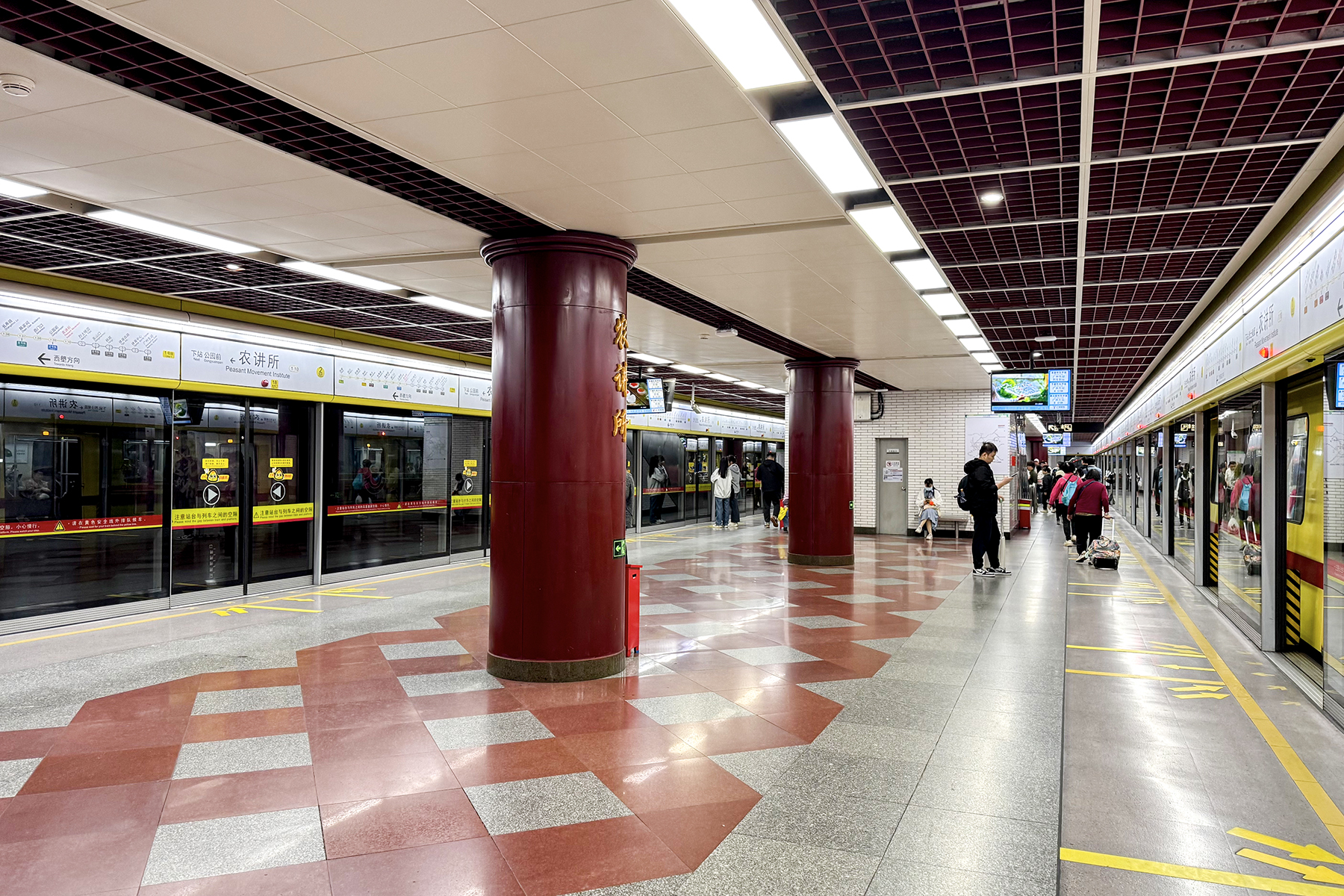

Chinese name
- Simplified Chinese: 农讲所站
- Traditional Chinese: 農講所站
Transcriptions
Standard Mandarin
- Hanyu Pinyin: Nóngjiǎngsuǒ Zhàn
Yue: Cantonese
- Jyutping: nung^{4}gong^{2}so^{2} zaam^{6}

General information
- Location: Yuexiu District, Guangzhou, Guangdong; China
- Operated by: Guangzhou Metro Co. Ltd.
- Line: Line 1
- Platforms: 2 (1 island platform)

Construction
- Structure type: Underground

Other information
- Station code: 110

History
- Opened: 28 June 1999; 27 years ago

Services
Preceding station	Guangzhou Metro	Following station
Gongyuanqian towards Xilang	Line 1	Martyrs' Park towards Guangzhou East Railway Station
Location

Peasant Movement Institute Station (simplified Chinese: 农讲所站; traditional Chinese: 農講所站; Jyutping: nung4 gong2 so2 zaam6; Cantonese Yale: Nùhnggóngsó Jaahm) is a station of Line 1 of the Guangzhou Metro. It started operations on 28 June 1999. It is located underground, below the junction of Zhongshan 4th Road and Dezheng Road in Yuexiu District. Its name is a result of being near the former site of Guangzhou Peasant Movement Institute, an institute established by the Chinese Communist Party to train youngsters for the peasants' revolutionary movement.

== Station layout ==
G	-	Exit
L1; Concourse	Lobby	Customer Service, Shops, Vending machines, ATMs
L2; Platforms	Platform 2	1 towards Xilang (Gongyuanqian)
L2; Platforms	Island platform, doors will open on the left
L2; Platforms	Platform 1	1 towards Guangzhou East Railway Station (Martyrs' Park)

== Exits ==
Exit number	Exit location
Exit A	Dezheng Zhonglu
Exit B	Dezheng Zhonglu
Exit C	Zhongshan Silu
Exit D	Zhongshan Silu

== Around the station ==
- Guangzhou Peasant Movement Institute
