= Peasant Movement Training Institute =

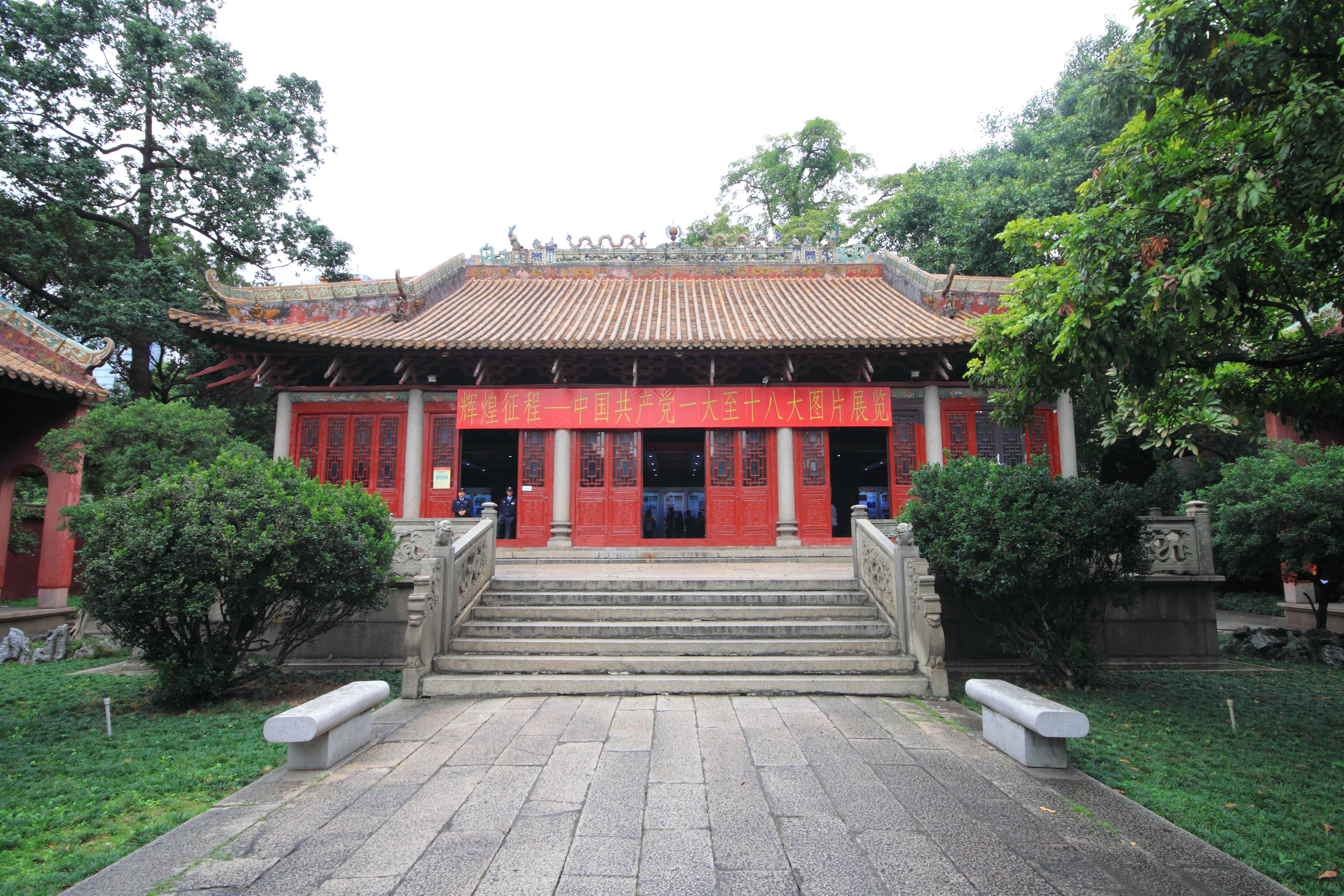
- Main hall of the institute
- Established: July 3, 1924
- Address: 53 South Yuexiu Road
- Location: Guangzhou, China
- Coordinates: 23°7′49.22″N 113°16′16.8″E
- Interactive map of Peasant Movement Training Institute
- Dissolved: September 1926

Peasant Movement Training Institute
- Simplified Chinese: 广州农民运动讲习所
- Traditional Chinese: 廣州農民運動講習所
- Literal meaning: Guangzhou Peasant Movement Lecture Site
Transcriptions
Standard Mandarin
- Hanyu Pinyin: Guǎngzhōu Nóngmín Yùndòng Jiǎngxí Suǒ
Yue: Cantonese
- Jyutping: Gwong^{2}-zau^{1} Nung^{4}-man^{4} Wan^{6}-dung^{6} Gong^{2}-jaap^{6} So^{2}

The Peasant Movement Training Institute or Peasant Training School was a school in Guangzhou (then romanized as "Canton"), China, operated from 1923 to 1926 during the First United Front between the Nationalists and Communists. It was located in a former Confucian temple built in the 14th century. The site now houses a museum to Guangzhou's revolutionary past.

== History ==
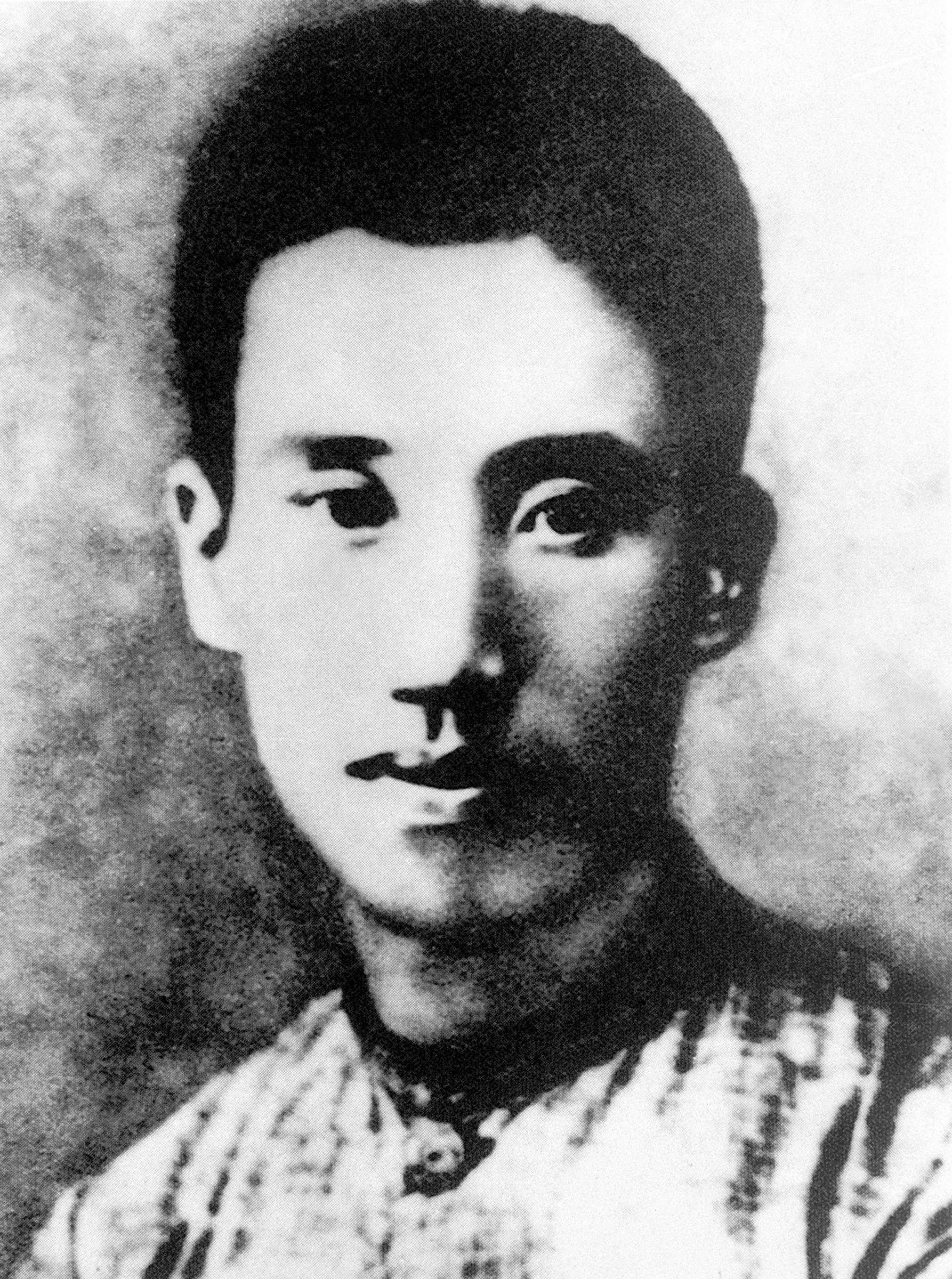
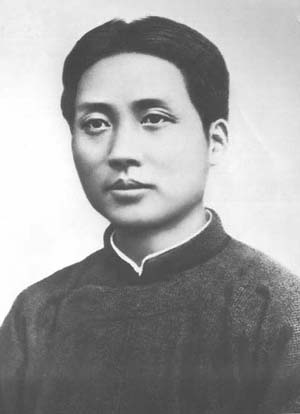
Peng Pai (left) and Mao Zedong (right) were the first and last directors of the PMTI, respectively.

The PMTI was one of the outcomes of the First United Front between the Kuomintang (KMT or Nationalist Party) and the Chinese Communist Party (CCP) during early-mid-1920s. In 1923, the KMT-CCP Alliance had been formed. The KMT was then led by Sun Yat-sen and carried out the policies of "alliance with Soviet Russia, cooperation with the Communists, and assistance to peasant and worker movements". In 1924, Peng Pai, one of the leaders of the CCP at its early stage, became a member of KMT and served as the Secretary of Peasant Department of KMT Central Committee. Based on Peng's suggestion, the KMT Central Committee decided to set up the institute to train young idealists from all over China who then went out to educate the masses in rural China. The decision to establish the PMTI was historic, in that it was the first formal government-sponsored training institute for rural political activities. The institute was officially opened on July 3, 1924, in Guangzhou at the Huizhou Association headquarters (惠州会馆) at 53 South Yuexiu Road (越秀南路), with Peng Pai as director.

Between July 1924 and September 1926, there were a total of 6 classes or terms held in the PMTI. Peng Pai was the Director for 1st and 5th terms, and Mao Zedong was the Director for 6th term or class with the largest size. Luo Yiyuan, Ruan Xiaoxian, and Tan Zhitang were Directors for 2nd, 3rd, and 4th terms, respectively. Some of the famous figures in the CCP lectured here, including Zhou Enlai, Yun Daiying, and Xiao Chu'nü.

The institute was closed in 1926 as the relationship between the Nationalists and Communists disintegrated. Many former students were killed during the failed 1927 uprising and are remembered in the Martyrs Memorial Park.

In the 1950s, the Peasant Movement Training Institute was reopened as a commemorative site and the lecture rooms and dormitories of the young revolutionaries have been recreated.

== See also ==
- PMTI Station of Guangzhou Metro
