= Qīn Prefecture =

Historical administrative division in Guangxi, China

Qīn Prefecture (欽州) Ningyue Commandery (寧越郡)
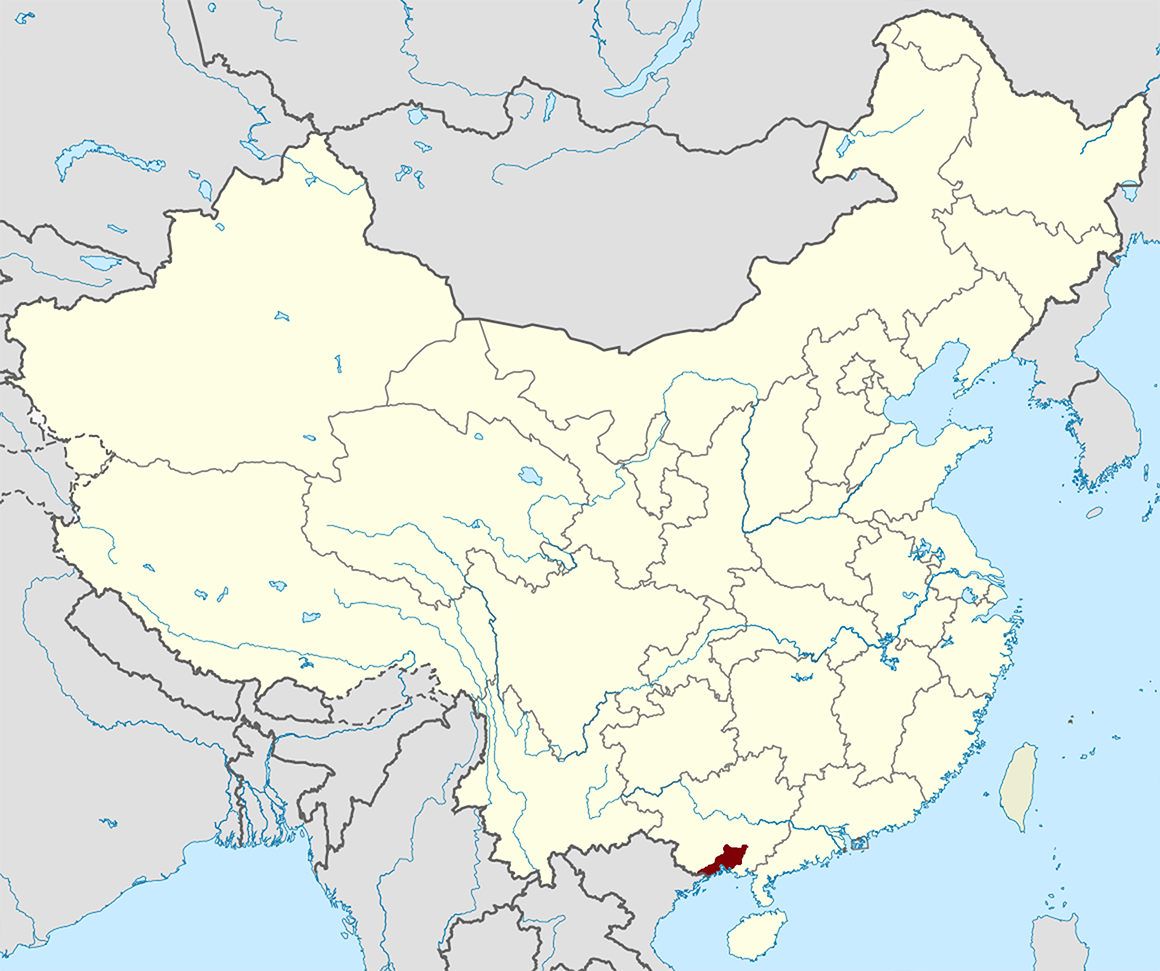
- Population
  - 740s or 750s: 10,146
  - 1070s or 1080s: Unknown, 10,552 households
- History
  - Preceded by: An Prefecture
  - Created: 598 (Sui dynasty)
  - Abolished: 1912 (R.O. China)
  - Succeeded by: Qin County, Guangxi
- Contained within
  - Circuit: Tang dynasty: Lingnan Circuit; Song dynasty: Guangnan Circuit; Guangnan West Circuit

Qīn Prefecture
- Traditional Chinese: 欽州
- Simplified Chinese: 钦州
Transcriptions
Standard Mandarin
- Hanyu Pinyin: Qīn Zhōu

Qīnzhōu or Qīn Prefecture was a zhou (prefecture) in imperial China in modern Guangxi, China. It existed (intermittently) from 598 to 1912. Between 607–621 and 742–758 it was known as Ningyue Commandery.

== Counties ==
Qīn Prefecture administered the following counties (縣) through history:

#	Name	Modern location
1	Lingshan (靈山)	Lingshan County
2	Zunhua (遵化)	Lingshan County
3	Anyuan (安遠) or Anjing (安京)	Qinzhou; Fangchenggang; Dongxing, Guangxi
4	Qinjiang (欽江)	Qinzhou; Fangchenggang; Dongxing, Guangxi
5	Neiting (內亭)	Qinzhou; Fangchenggang; Dongxing, Guangxi
