= An Prefecture =

Historical administrative division in Hubei, China

- Chinese: 安州
Transcriptions
Standard Mandarin
- Hanyu Pinyin: Ān Zhōu
- Wade–Giles: An^{1} Chou^{1}

Anzhou or An Prefecture was a zhou (prefecture) in imperial China, centering on modern Anlu, Hubei, China. It existed (intermittently) from 550 until 1119, when the Song dynasty renamed it De'an Prefecture.

== Geography ==
The administrative region of An Prefecture in the Tang dynasty was in modern central Hubei. It probably includes parts of modern:

- Under the administration of Xiaogan:
  - Xiaogan
  - Anlu
  - Yingcheng
  - Yunmeng County
  - Xiaochang County
- Under the administration of Suizhou:
  - Guangshui

== See also ==
- Anlu Commandery
- De'an Prefecture
