= Zuo River =

Coordinates: 22.8300°N 108.1064°E

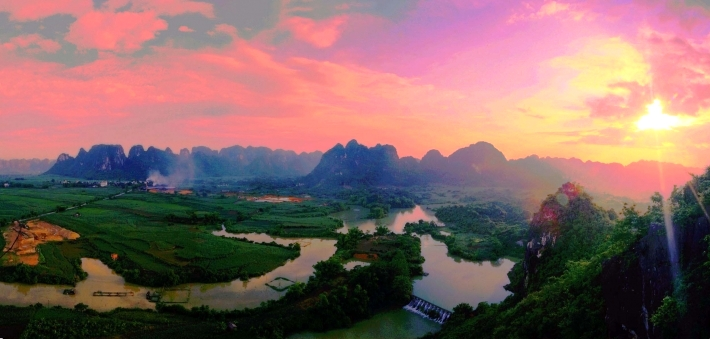
- Zuo River scenery in Fusui

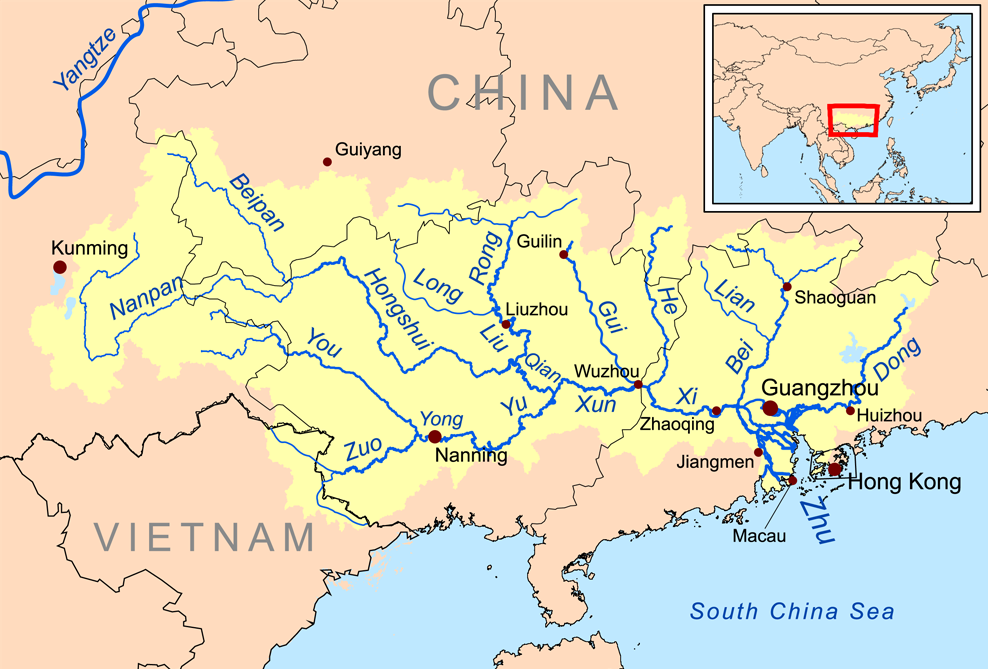
- Watershed of the Pearl River
- Native name: Sông Tả Giang (Vietnamese); 左江 (Chinese)

Location
- Country: China, Vietnam

Physical characteristics
- Length: 539 km (335 mi)
- Basin size: 32,068 km^{2} (12,382 sq mi)

The Zuo River (Chinese: 左江; pinyin: Zuǒjiāng; lit. 'Left River',Vietnamese: Tả Giang) is a river of Guangxi, China. It begins from the confluence of the Bằng River and Kỳ Cùng River near Longzhou and joins the You River ("Right River") near Nanning to form the Yong River. These rivers form part of the Pearl River system, which flows into the South China Sea near Guangzhou. The Zuo River historically was the main communication route in the area, linking the villages of the Zuo Valley to each other, to major Chinese centres to the north and east and to southern territories that are now part of Vietnam.

== See also ==
- List of rivers in China
