= An Prefecture (Guangxi) =

Historical administrative division in Guangxi, China

Anzhou (Chinese: 安州; pinyin: Ānzhōu) was a prefecture (州) created by the Liang dynasty.

Initially, its prefecture seat was at Songshou county (宋寿县, located on the northwest banks of the Qin River, northeast of modern Qinzhou), which was a part of Songshou commandery (宋寿郡). After the Sui conquest of Chen, Songshou commandery was abolished. In 598, Anzhou was changed into Qinzhou prefecture, and its prefecture seat of Songshou county became part of the Ningyue commandery (宁越郡).
