= Longzhou County =

Longzhou County 龙州县 · Lungzcouh Yen
- County
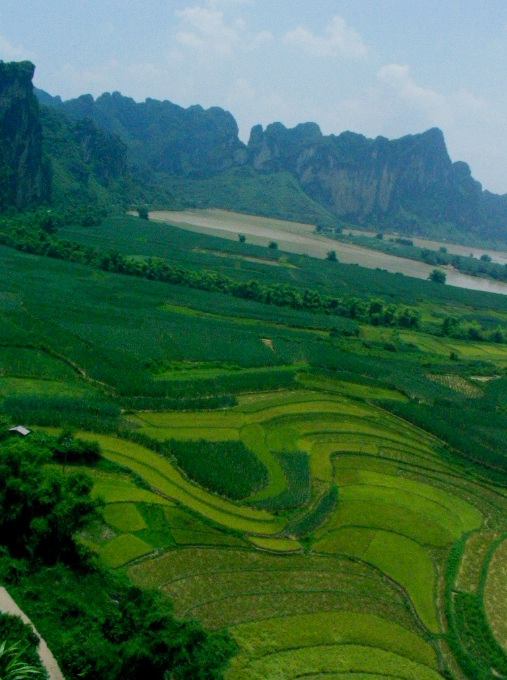
- Typical scene in the county, taken in July in Shangjin Township with the Zuo River in the background
- Interactive map of Longzhou County
- Coordinates: 22°20′42″N 106°51′15″E
- Country: China
- Region: Guangxi
- Prefecture-level city: Chongzuo
- County seat: Longzhou Town

Area
  - Total: 2,317.8 km^{2} (894.9 sq mi)

Population (2020)
  - Total: 232,068
  - Density: 100.12/km^{2} (259.32/sq mi)
- Time zone: UTC+8 (China Standard)

Longzhou County
- Traditional Chinese: 龍州縣
- Simplified Chinese: 龙州县
- Literal meaning: Dragon Prefecture County
Transcriptions
Standard Mandarin
- Hanyu Pinyin: Lóngzhōu Xiàn
- Wade–Giles: Lung-chou Hsien

Longzhou County is a county of southwestern Guangxi, China, bordering Cao Bằng province, Vietnam. It is under the jurisdiction of the prefecture-level city of Chongzuo.

Longzhou lies in a circular valley at the junction of the Xun and Gui rivers.

== History ==
Longzhou was opened to foreign trade—chiefly from nearby French Indochina—in 1889. During the Chinese Civil War, the Longzhou Uprising began on 2 February 1930 and established the "Zuo River Soviet" in Longzhou and seven nearby counties before being suppressed later the same year by the Nationalist Army with assistance from the French Indochinese air force.

== Geography and climate ==
Longzhou has a monsoon-influenced humid subtropical climate (Köppen Cwa), with short, mild winters, and long, very hot and humid summers. Winter begins dry but becomes progressively wetter and cloudier. Spring is generally overcast and often rainy, while summer continues to be rainy though is the sunniest time of year. Autumn is sunny and dry. The monthly 24-hour average temperature ranges from 14.7 °C (58.5 °F) in January to 29.2 °C (84.6 °F) in July, and the annual mean is 23.12 °C (73.6 °F). The annual rainfall is just above 1,300 mm (51 in), a majority of which is delivered from June to August. With monthly percent possible sunshine ranging from 16% in February and March to 50% in September, the county receives 1,583 hours of bright sunshine annually.

Climate data for Longzhou, elevation 129 m (423 ft), (1991–2020 normals, extremes 1953–present)
Month	Jan	Feb	Mar	Apr	May	Jun	Jul	Aug	Sep	Oct	Nov	Dec	Year
Record high °C (°F)	32.6 (90.7)	36.7 (98.1)	37.1 (98.8)	40.4 (104.7)	41.6 (106.9)	40.1 (104.2)	39.1 (102.4)	39.9 (103.8)	38.6 (101.5)	36.5 (97.7)	35.2 (95.4)	31.7 (89.1)	41.6 (106.9)
Mean daily maximum °C (°F)	18.4 (65.1)	20.8 (69.4)	23.3 (73.9)	28.5 (83.3)	32.1 (89.8)	33.4 (92.1)	33.6 (92.5)	33.3 (91.9)	32.3 (90.1)	29.5 (85.1)	25.6 (78.1)	21.0 (69.8)	27.7 (81.8)
Daily mean °C (°F)	14.2 (57.6)	16.3 (61.3)	19.2 (66.6)	23.8 (74.8)	26.9 (80.4)	28.3 (82.9)	28.4 (83.1)	27.9 (82.2)	26.8 (80.2)	23.9 (75.0)	19.8 (67.6)	15.6 (60.1)	22.6 (72.7)
Mean daily minimum °C (°F)	11.4 (52.5)	13.4 (56.1)	16.6 (61.9)	20.6 (69.1)	23.4 (74.1)	25.0 (77.0)	25.1 (77.2)	24.7 (76.5)	23.3 (73.9)	20.3 (68.5)	16.1 (61.0)	12.1 (53.8)	19.3 (66.8)
Record low °C (°F)	−3 (27)	2.2 (36.0)	3.0 (37.4)	9.2 (48.6)	15.1 (59.2)	17.4 (63.3)	19.9 (67.8)	19.6 (67.3)	14.7 (58.5)	8.3 (46.9)	3.4 (38.1)	−0.2 (31.6)	−3 (27)
Average precipitation mm (inches)	34.6 (1.36)	27.2 (1.07)	56.5 (2.22)	77.9 (3.07)	150.6 (5.93)	214.8 (8.46)	215.5 (8.48)	228.2 (8.98)	116.1 (4.57)	63.3 (2.49)	35.3 (1.39)	28.1 (1.11)	1,248.1 (49.13)
Average precipitation days (≥ 0.1 mm)	10.3	9.9	13.8	12.0	13.8	17.3	17.8	16.9	11.1	7.8	6.7	7.2	144.6
Average snowy days	0.1	0	0	0	0	0	0	0	0	0	0	0	0.1
Average relative humidity (%)	78	77	80	78	77	81	82	83	80	78	77	76	79
Mean monthly sunshine hours	63.1	62.1	53.1	96.1	159.5	157.1	179.1	182.3	171.2	154.1	127.3	106.4	1,511.4
Percentage possible sunshine	19	19	14	25	39	39	44	46	47	43	39	32	34
Source: China Meteorological Administration extremesall-time October record

== Administrative divisions ==
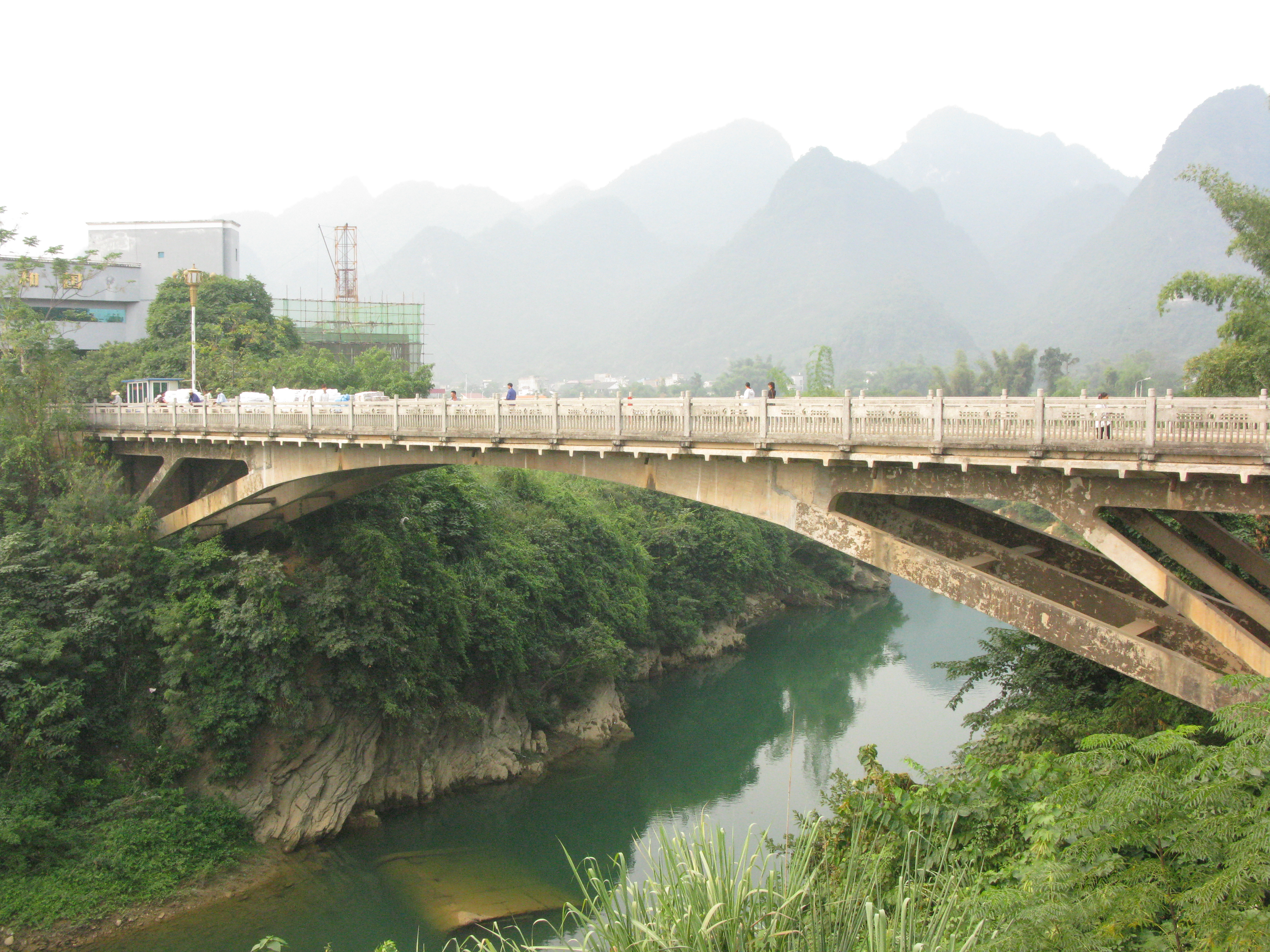
Border bridge crossing between Shuikou Township of Longzhou and Ta Lung, Vietnam over the Shuikou River.

Longzhou County has 5 towns and 7 townships under its jurisdiction.

Towns

- Longzhou (龙州镇)
- Xiadong (下冻镇)
- Shuikou (水口镇)
- Jinlong (金龙镇)
- Xiangshui (响水镇)

Townships

- Bajiao (八角乡)
- Shangjiang (上降乡)
- Binqiao (彬桥乡)
- Shanglong (上龙乡)
- Wude (武德乡)
- Zhubu (逐卜乡)
- Shangjin (上金乡)

== See also ==
- Longzhou Uprising
