= You River (Guangxi) =

River in Yunnan and Guangxi, China

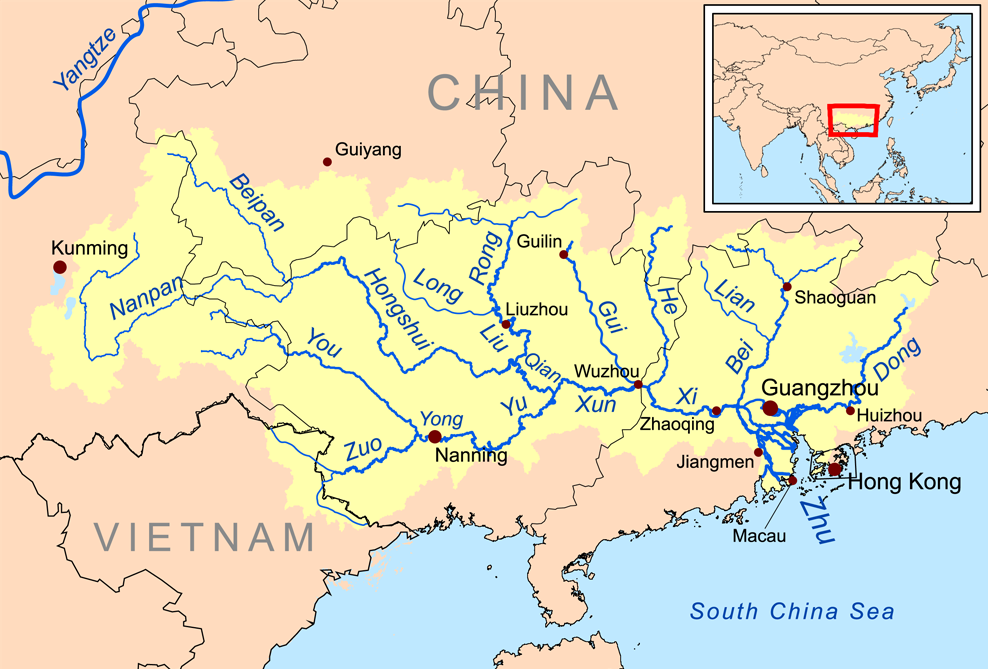
Watershed of the Pearl River

The You River (Chinese: 右江; pinyin: Yòujiāng; lit. 'Right River'), also known as the Youjiang River, is a river of Guangxi, China. It rises in eastern Yunnan and joins the Zuo River ("Left River") near Nanning to form the Yong River. These rivers form part of the Pearl River system, which flows into the South China Sea near Guangzhou, Guangdong province.

The river lends it name to the language Youjiang Zhuang, the area Youjiang District, Baise and to a university Youjiang Medical University for Nationalities. Formerly, Baise Bama Airport was known as Baise Youjiang Airport between December 2006 and September 2013.

== See also ==
- List of rivers in China
- Baise Uprising
