= Jianshe 6th Road station =

Guangzhou Metro Line 12 and Line 13 station under construction

Jianshe 6th Road 建设六马路

Chinese name
- Traditional Chinese: 建設六馬路站
- Simplified Chinese: 建设六马路站
Transcriptions
Standard Mandarin
- Hanyu Pinyin: Jiànshè Liùmǎlù Zhàn
Yue: Cantonese
- Yale Romanization: Ginchit Luhkmáhlouh Jaahm
- Jyutping: Gin^{3}cit^{3} Luk^{6}maa^{5}lou^{6} Zaam^{6}

General information
- Location: Intersection of Jianshe 6th Road and Dongfeng East Road; Jianshe Subdistrict, Yuexiu District, Guangzhou, Guangdong; China
- Coordinates: 23°8′1.7″N 113°16′41.9″E
- Operator: Guangzhou Metro Co. Ltd.
- Lines: Line 12; Line 13
- Platforms: 4 (1 island platform and 1 split island platform)
- Tracks: 4

Construction
- Structure type: Underground
- Accessible: Yes

Other information
- Station code: 1214 1312

History
- Opening: December 2026 (1 month's time) (expected)

Services
Preceding station	Guangzhou Metro	Following station
Future services
Luhu Lake towards Xunfenggang	Line 12	Martyrs' Park towards Higher Education Mega Center South
Cangbian Road towards Yagang	Line 13	Zhixin towards Xinsha
Transfer at Taojin station
Xiaobei towards Jiaokou	Line 5	Ouzhuang towards Huangpu New Port
Location

Jianshe 6th Road station (Chinese: 建设六马路站; pinyin: Jiànshè Liùmǎlù Zhàn; Cantonese Yale: Ginchit Luhkmáhlouh Jaahm) is an interchange station under construction on Line 12 and Line 13 of the Guangzhou Metro. It is located underground at the intersection of Jianshe 6th Road and Dongfeng East Road in Guangzhou's Yuexiu District.

== Station layout ==
This station is a three-story underground station. The ground level is the station entrance/exit, and it is surrounded by Dongfeng East Road, Jianshe 6th Road, Huadong Road and nearby communities and buildings. The first floor is the concourse, the second floor is the platform for Line 12, and the third floor is the platform for Line 13.

G	-	Exits
M	-	(Unknown use)
L1; Concourse	Transfer Passage	Towards Line 5 Taojin
L1; Concourse	12 Lobby	Ticket Machines, Customer Service, Shops, Police Station, Security Facilities
L1; Concourse	Transfer Passage	Towards Line 12 concourse and Line 13 west concourse
L1; Concourse	13 West Lobby	Ticket Machines, Customer Service, Shops, Police Station, Security Facilities
L1; Concourse	13 East Lobby	Ticket Machines, Customer Service, Shops, Police Station, Security Facilities
L2; 12 Platforms	Platform 2	12 towards Xunfenggang (Luhu Lake)
L2; 12 Platforms	Island platform, doors will open on the left
L2; 12 Platforms	Platform 1	12 towards Higher Education Mega Center South (Martyrs' Park)
L3; 13 Platforms	Platform 4	13 towards Yagang (Cangbian Road)
L3; 13 Platforms	Side platform, doors will open on the left
L3; 13 Platforms	Pedestrian Passageway	Passage linking Line 13 platforms
L3; 13 Platforms	Side platform, doors will open on the left
L3; 13 Platforms	Platform 3	13 towards Xinsha (Zhixin)

=== Concourse ===
The Line 12 concourse is one whole concourse, and the north end is equipped with a transfer passage to connect to the Line 5 station. Line 13 has two cut-and-cover concourses split between its east and west sides.

There are automatic ticket machines and an AI customer service center at the concourse. There are elevators, escalators, and stairs in the fare-paid areas of the respective concourses for passengers to reach the platforms.

=== Platform ===
The Line 12 station has an island platform located under Jianshe 6th Road. Line 13 has a split island platform located under Dongfeng East Road. Line 12 is on the upper level and Line 13 is on the lower level. There is a single crossing line at the north end of the Line 12 station.

== History ==
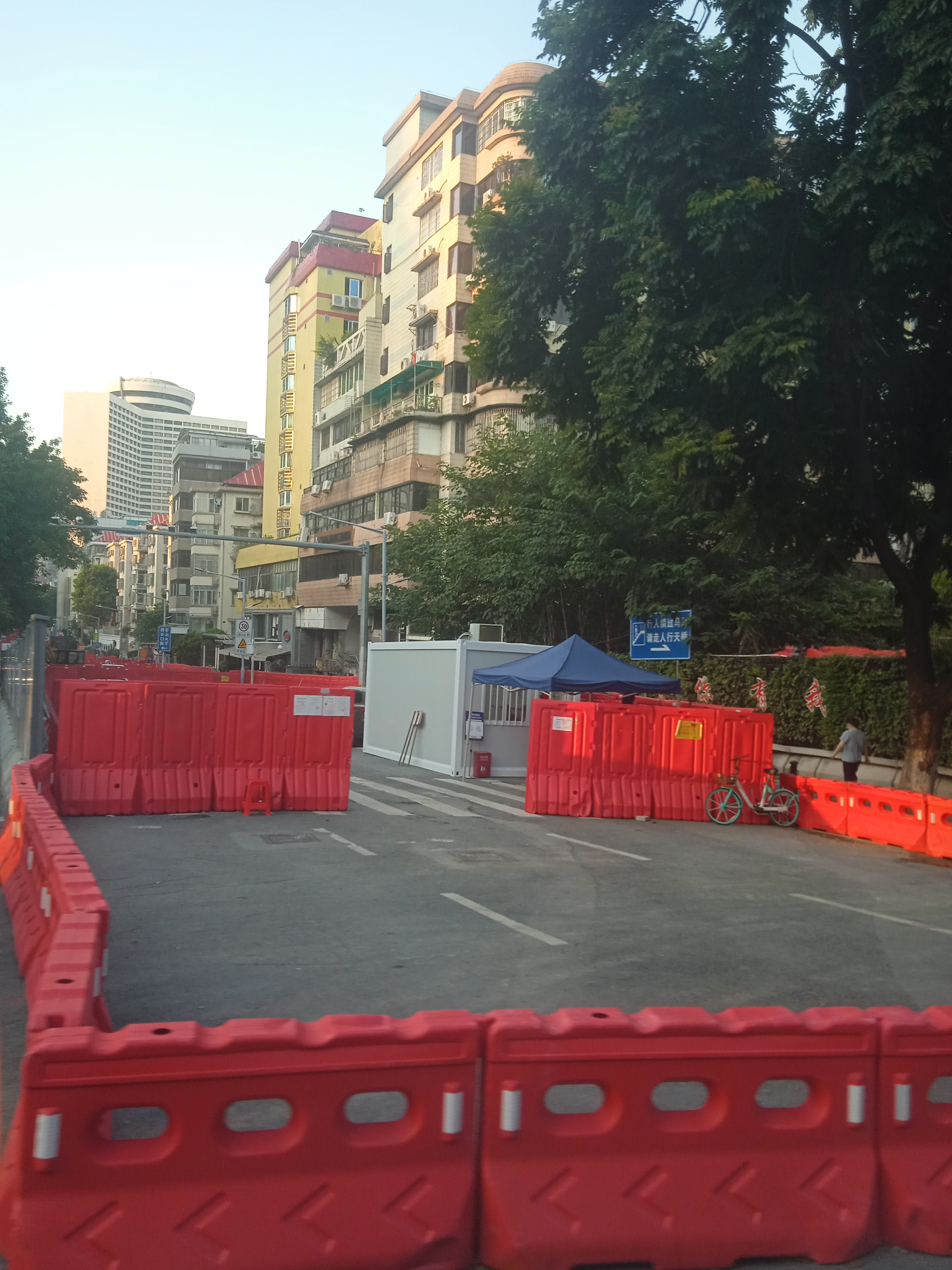
Line 12 construction site (September 2022)

The station appeared at the beginning of the planning and design of Line 12, and its general location is essentially the same as the current one. The station is designed as an interchange station with Line 13. In addition, Line 12 has a Line 5 Taojin station transfer during planning, but due to the wiring and train design of Line 12, the length of the section between it and this station is too short, and the passenger flow forecast of Line 12 showed that the number of passengers transferring to Line 13 is greater than that of Line 5. Therefore, it was later decided to cancel the establishment of the Line 5 station in the approval of the Line 12 project and the announcement of the environmental impact assessment, and instead set up a long transfer passage at the north end of the station to connect to the Line 5 station to realize the transfer between Line 12, Line 13 and Line 5. In this scheme, in order to connect the lines located at the north and south ends of the road, the length of the Line 13 station is 247.55 meters, and the length of the Line 12 station is 595.1 meters.

In February 2019, the Guangzhou Metro and Yuexiu District Government proposed to build the station as a comprehensive rail transit station complex and a city-level medical and convalescent complex, meaning that the station would be built simultaneously with the complex. The site of the complex was still the Dongfeng Campus of the Guangzhou Eighth People's Hospital at the time of the plan's announcement, and it is planned to develop the complex after the Eighth Hospital is relocated to the Jiahe Campus, which meant the station plan still has room for adjustments. However, due to the outbreak of the COVID-19 pandemic a year later, the relocation plan of the Eighth Hospital was abandoned, and construction of the station was unable to start. (Note: After several months of finalizing the station plan, the campus was finally officially relocated on 4 February 2023. The original site will be used to build a new campus, of which construction began in September 2025. An underground passage will be built in the concourse area of Line 13 to connect to the new campus.) In mid-2020, the area where the station is located was included in the Huanshi East Area Urban Renewal and Redevelopment Project. The authorities will coordinate the development of land parcels along Jianshe 6th Road and the underground space from Taojin station to this station.

In January 2022, in order to better connect the transfer between this station and the Taojin station of Line 5, the platform of Line 12 was moved north to the south side of the junction of Huale Road and Jianshe 6th Road. At the same time, a concourse will be set up at the north end of the Line 12 station, connecting to the west side of the Taojin station concourse for transfer. The relevant plan was subsequently officially approved and confirmed by the Municipal Planning Bureau and the Resources Bureau. In July of the same year, the relevant departments of Yuexiu District launched the relevant requisition and demolition work, and construction officially started on 29 August 2022.

In January 2025, the underground platform tunnel of the Line 13 station was completed. In March 2026, the transfer nodes were topped out. In early June 2026, the main structure of the Line 12 station was topped out, followed by the construction of electromechanical systems, interior decoration, and auxiliary structures. In late June, the first entrance/exit of the Line 13 station was completed. In early July of the same year, the main structure of the Line 13 station was also topped out, and the remaining exits were constructed, along with the electromechanical systems for the concourse and platforms.

=== Station naming ===
This station was originally named Jianshe 6th Road station during planning and construction. Since the final construction plan of this station was able to connect with Line 5, and the "Guangzhou Metro Station Naming Rules" required that "the same transfer station of two or more metro lines should use the same name, and the name that was used first shall prevail", in the preliminary name announcement of the stations of the eastern section of Line 12 in August 2024, this station was proposed to be named Taojin station in accordance with the Line 5 station. However, the main body of this station is far away from the Taojin Pit, the source of the name of Taojin station, which does not meet the requirements of "name and place match, clear indication" in the "Guangzhou Metro Station Naming Rules", and this move has been questioned as potentially misleading passengers. The Civil Affairs Bureau responded that it would transfer the matter to the metro group for further research and demonstration. The station was finally named Jianshe 6th Road station in April 2025 to meet the naming principle of "matching place and name" for metro stations.This makes it the first transfer hub in Guangzhou Metro network to connect two stations with different names.
