= Dongshankou, Guangzhou =

Area of Guangzhou, China

- Traditional Chinese: 東山口
- Simplified Chinese: 东山口
Transcriptions
Standard Mandarin
- Hanyu Pinyin: Dōngshānkǒu
- Wade–Giles: Tung^{1}-shan^{1}-k‘ou^{3}
- IPA: [tʊ́ŋ.ʂán.kʰǒʊ]
Yue: Cantonese
- Yale Romanization: Dūngsāanháu
- Jyutping: dung1 saan1 hau2
- IPA: [tʊŋ˥.san˥.hɐw˧˥]

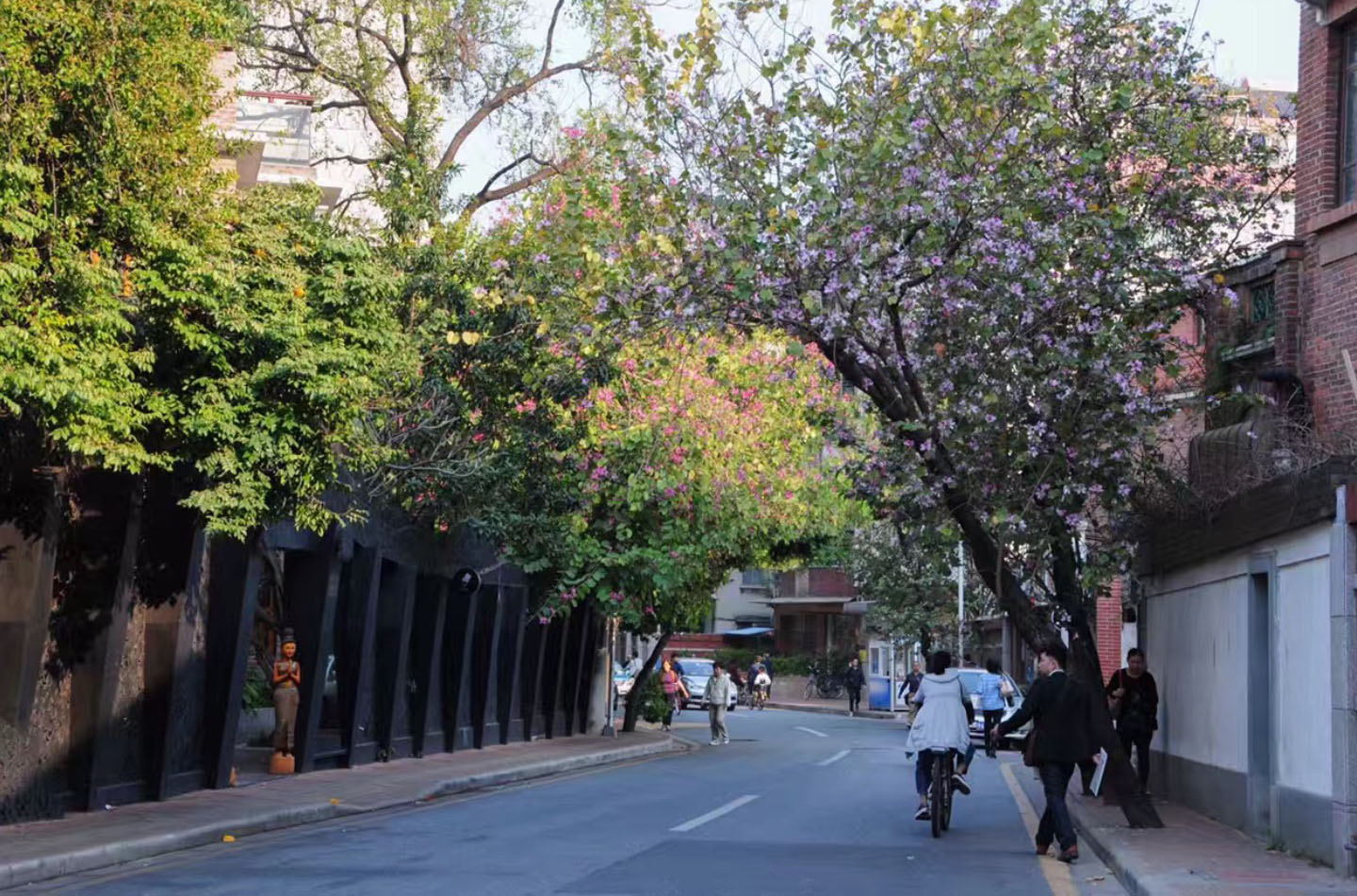
Si Bei Tong Jin Road

Dongshankou (Chinese: 东山口; Cantonese Yale: Dūngsāanháu; lit. 'the entrance of East Hill') is an area in the Yuexiu District of Guangzhou, Guangdong province, People's Republic of China. The name "Dongshan" can trace back to Ming dynasty (14th–17th century). A eunuch named Wei Juan, who was an officer in Guangzhou in years of Chenghua of Ming dynasty, built a temple on a small hill in the east side of Guangzhou city to boast himself. Guangzhou people at that time often called the main small hill as "Shan" and called the hummocks around it as "Gang", so they named the temple "Dongshan Temple" (Chinese: 东山寺; lit. 'East Hill temple'). After that, the surrounding area is called Dongshan.

== History ==
According to the historic record, Dongshankou was the suburb area of Guangzhou city before Qing dynasty. With poor development and utilization, this wooded area was called "Jindongjiao" (Chinese: 近东郊), which means the Near Eastern suburbs. In the late Qing dynasty, as the modern industry began to grow, Dongshankou met the unprecedented development opportunity. During the same period, the construction of Guangdong–Hankou Railway and Kowloon–Canton Railway promoted a rapid population growth in Guangzhou city. Therefore, Dongshankou became a hotspot of the development of public buildings and residential area. Under the Treaty of Wanghia, the Southern Baptist Convention bought lands on Miao Qian Xi Road, Xu Gu Yuan Road, Pei Zheng Road and Si Bei Tong Jin Street in Dongshankou and erected churches, schools and hospitals there. After World War I, some Overseas Chinese came back to Guangzhou and became the main force of Dongshankou development. Dongshankou had belong to Dongshan District before the district merged with Yuexiu District in 2005.

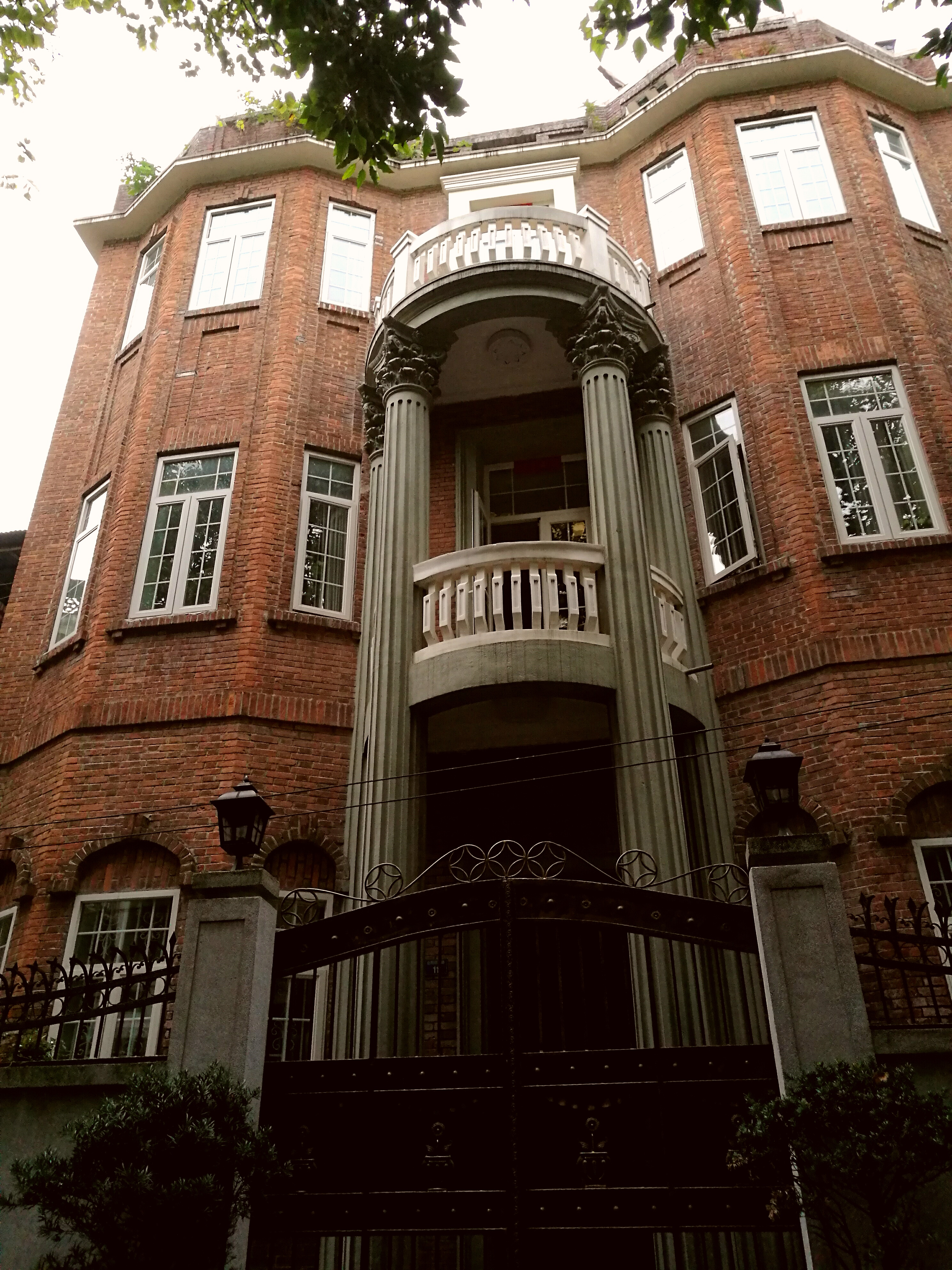
A Dongshan historic mansion in Dongshankou

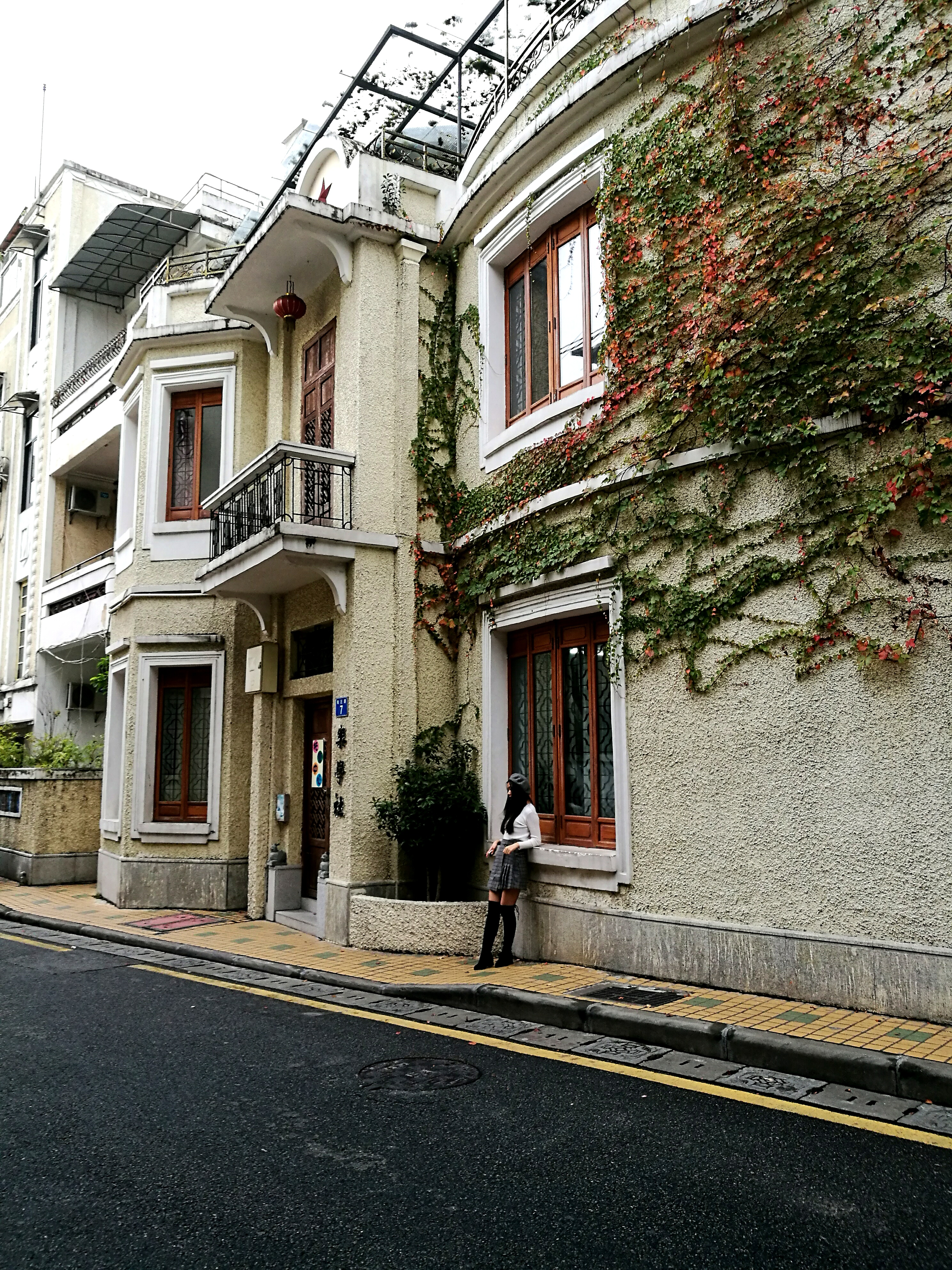
A Dongshan mansion

== Landmarks ==
- Tung Shan Christian Church (Chinese: 基督教东山堂; pinyin: Jīdūjiàodōngshāntáng)

Tung Shan Christian Church, formerly Tung Shan Baptist Church, was built in 1909 by the Southern Baptist Convention.

- The Museum of Site of the 3rd National Congress of the Chinese Communist Party (Chinese: 中共三大会址纪念馆; pinyin: Zhōnggòngsāndàhuìzhǐjìnìanguǎn)
- Dongshan historical mansions (Chinese: 东山洋房; pinyin: Dōngshānyángfáng)

Most of the historical mansions and villas in Dongshankou are listed as important protection units of cultural relic. These historical mansions, combined with Chinese and Western styles, show the special and multicultural history of Guangzhou City. Kui Yuan, Chun Yuan, Jian Yuan, Ming Yuan and Yu Yuan are prime examples.

- Guangzhou Dongshan Lake Park (Chinese: 广州东山湖公园; pinyin: Guāngzhōudōngshānhúgōngyuán)
- Guangzhou Yuexiu Library (Chinese: 广州越秀区图书馆; pinyin: Guāngzhōuyuèxìuqūtúshūguǎn)

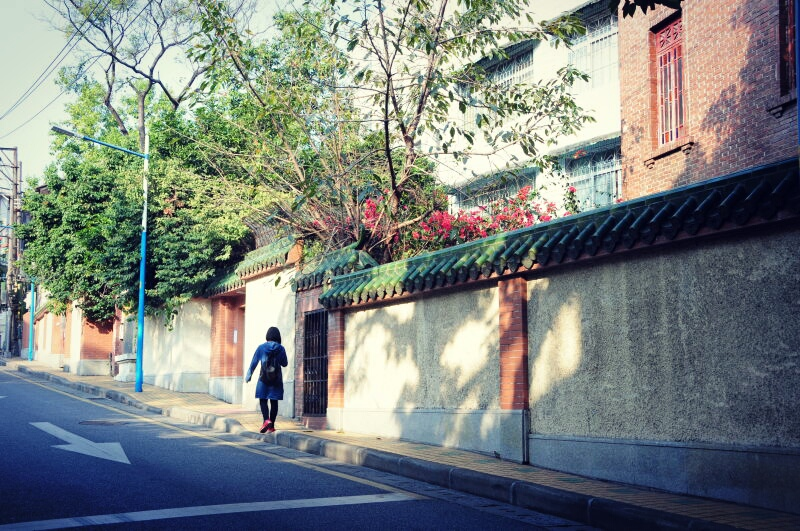
A street in Dongshankou

== Dongshankou today ==
People also come to Dongshankou to visit historical mansions, many of which have been renovated into upscale bars, cafés, restaurants, clubs and galleries. Besides, the film Hell Lover was shot in Dongshankou in 2016.

== See also ==
- Dongshankou Station
- Dongshan District, Guangzhou
