= Dongshankou station =

Guangzhou Metro interchange station

Coordinates: 23.12411°N 113.29529°E

Dongshankou 东山口
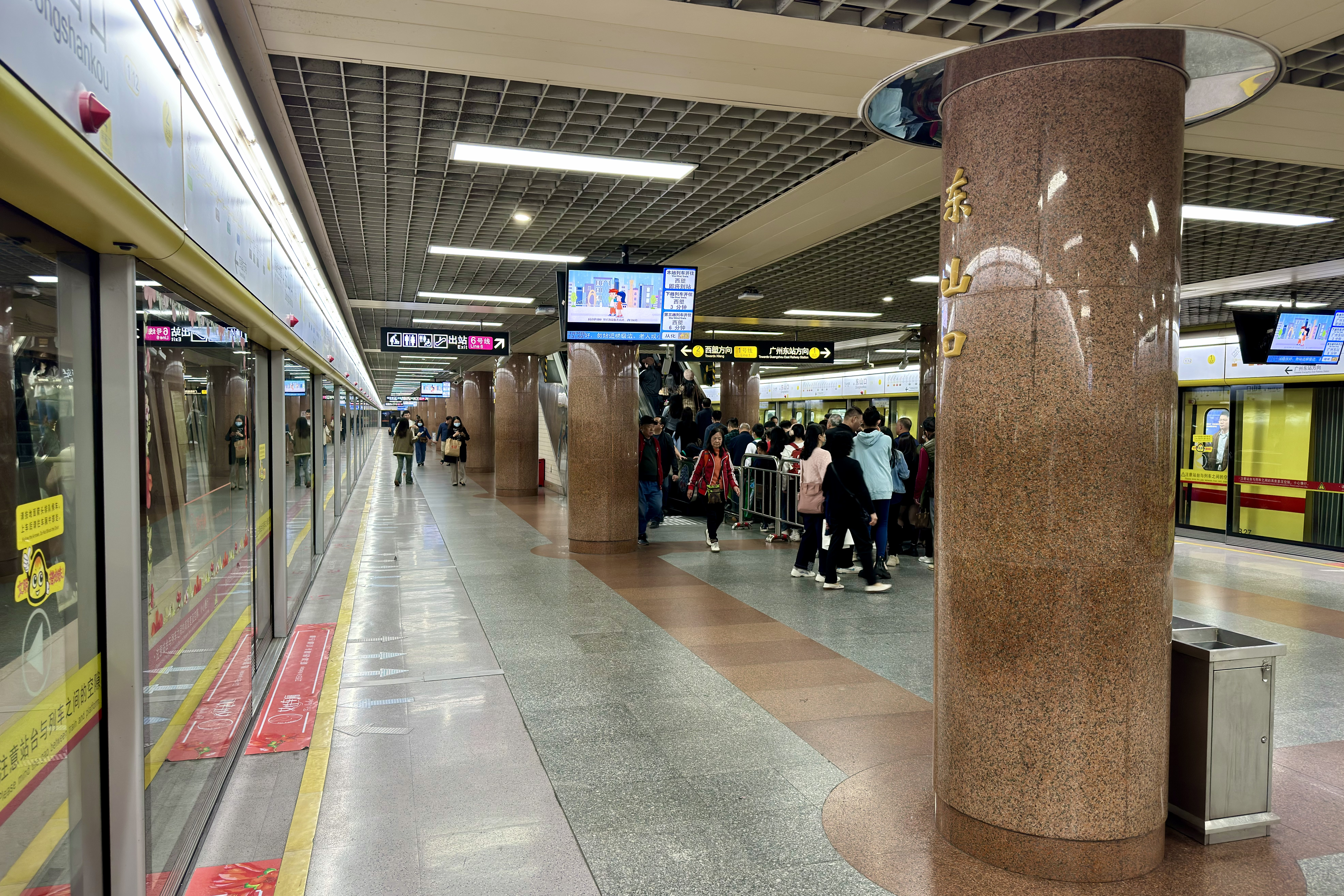
- Line 1 platform

Chinese name
- Simplified Chinese: 东山口站
- Traditional Chinese: 東山口站
- Literal meaning: Entrance of East Hill Station
Transcriptions
Standard Mandarin
- Hanyu Pinyin: Dōngshānkǒu Zhàn
Yue: Cantonese
- Jyutping: dung^{1}saan^{1}hau^{2} zaam^{6}
- Hong Kong Romanization: Tung Shan Hau station

General information
- Location: Yuexiu District, Guangzhou, Guangdong; China
- Operated by: Guangzhou Metro Co. Ltd.
- Lines: Line 1; Line 6
- Platforms: 4 (2 island platforms)
- Tracks: 4

Construction
- Structure type: Underground
- Accessible: Yes

Other information
- Station code: 112 614

History
- Opened: 28 June 1999; 26 years ago (Line 1); 28 December 2013; 12 years ago (Line 6)

Services
Preceding station	Guangzhou Metro	Following station
Martyrs' Park towards Xilang	Line 1	Yangji towards Guangzhou East Railway Station
Donghu towards Xunfenggang	Line 6	Ouzhuang towards Xiangxue
Location

Dongshankou Station (simplified Chinese: 东山口站; traditional Chinese: 東山口站; Jyutping: dung1 saan1 hau2 zaam6; Cantonese Yale: Dūngsāanháu Jaahm) is an interchange station between Line 1 and Line 6 of the Guangzhou Metro. Line 1 started operations on 28 June 1999. Line 6 started operations on 28 December 2013. It is situated under Zhongshan Road (中山路), Nonglinxia Road (农林下路), Donghua Road South (东华南路), and Shuqian Road (署前路) in the Dongshankou area of Yuexiu District. The station takes its name from the former business district of Dongshan.

== Station layout ==
G	-	Exits C, E, F
L1; Concourse	Line 1 Lobby	Ticket Machines, Customer Service, Shops, Safety Facilities
L1; Concourse	Transfer Passageway	Transfer passageway between Lines 1 & 6
L1; Concourse	Line 6 Lobby	Ticket Machines, Customer Service, Baby Change, Safety Facilities
L1; Concourse	-	Pedestrian subway
L2; Line 1 Platforms	Platform 2	1 towards Xilang (Martyrs' Park)
L2; Line 1 Platforms	Island platform, doors will open on the left
L2; Line 1 Platforms	Platform 1	1 towards Guangzhou East Railway Station (Yangji)
L2; Line 1 Platforms	Buffer Area	Buffer area of Line 6
L3; Equipment Area	-	Station equipment
L4; Line 6 Platforms	Platform 4	6 towards Xunfenggang (Donghu)
L4; Line 6 Platforms	Side platform, doors will open on the left
L4; Line 6 Platforms	Pedestrian Passageway	Passage linking Line 6 platforms
L4; Line 6 Platforms	Side platform, doors will open on the left
L4; Line 6 Platforms	Platform 3	6 towards Xiangxue (Ouzhuang)

== Gallery ==
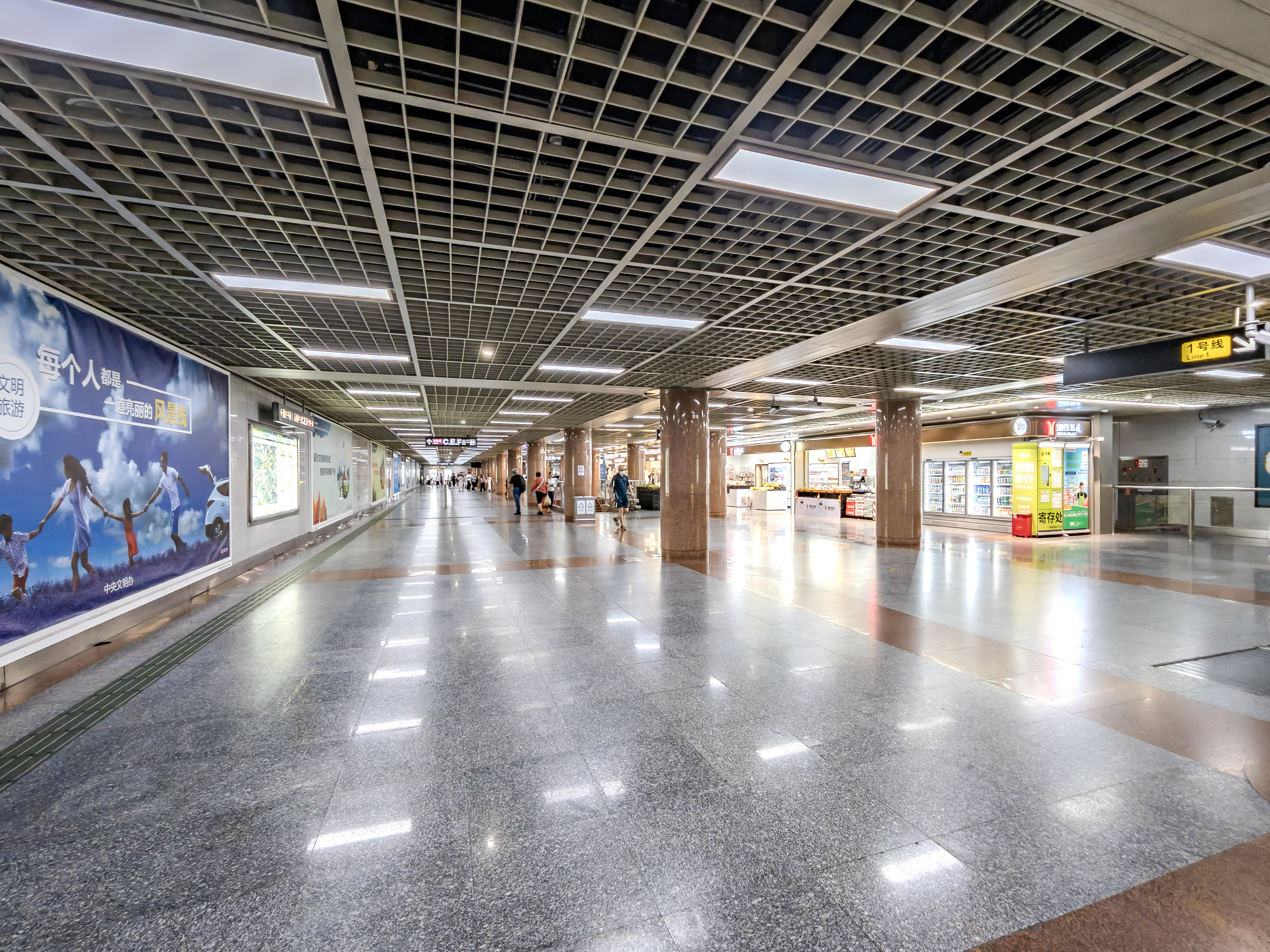
Line 1 concourse

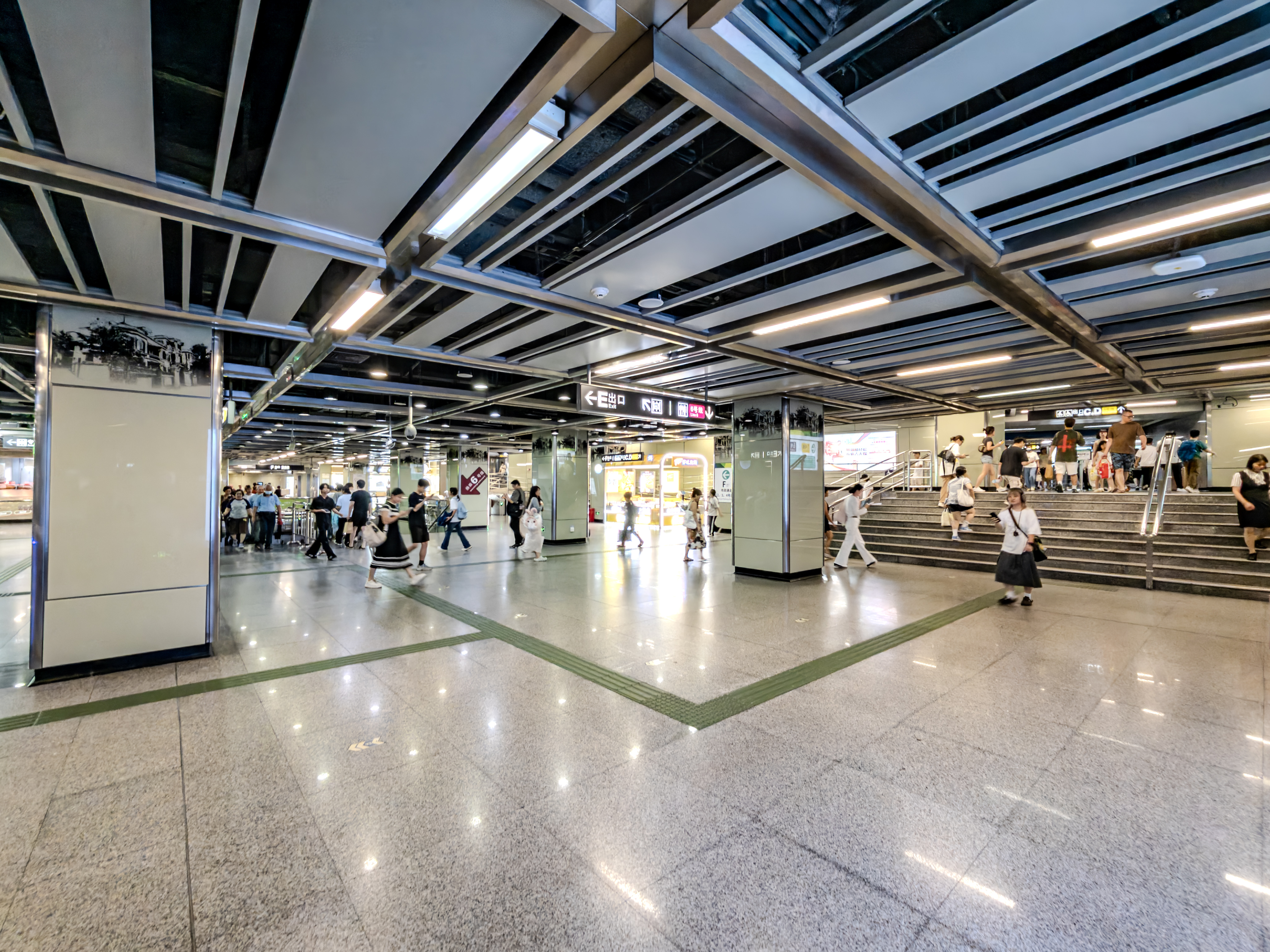
Line 6 concourse

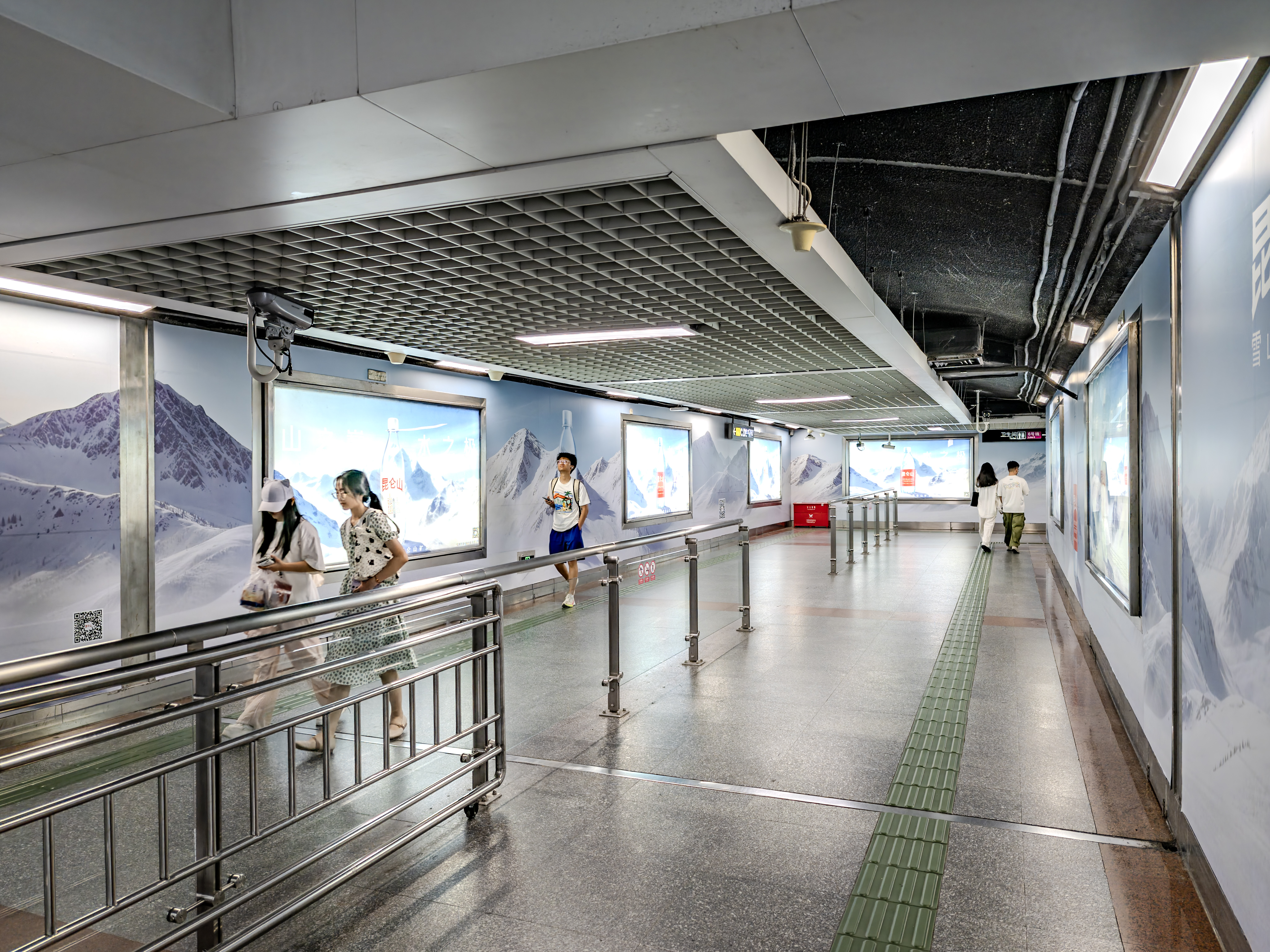
Transfer corridor

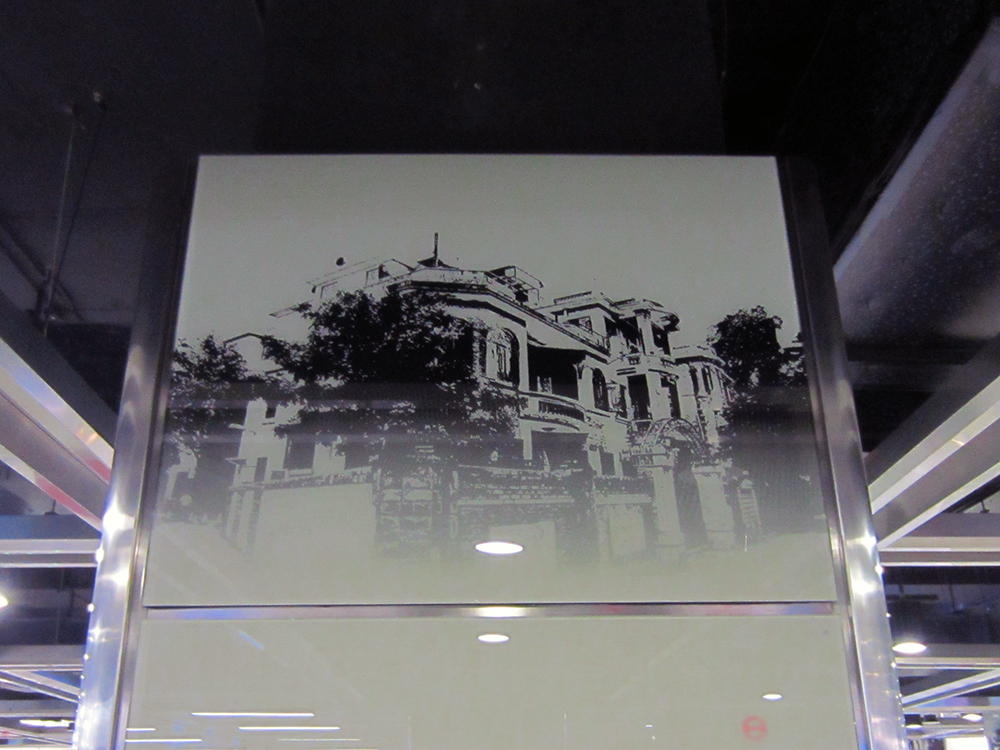
Line 6 platform wall decoration

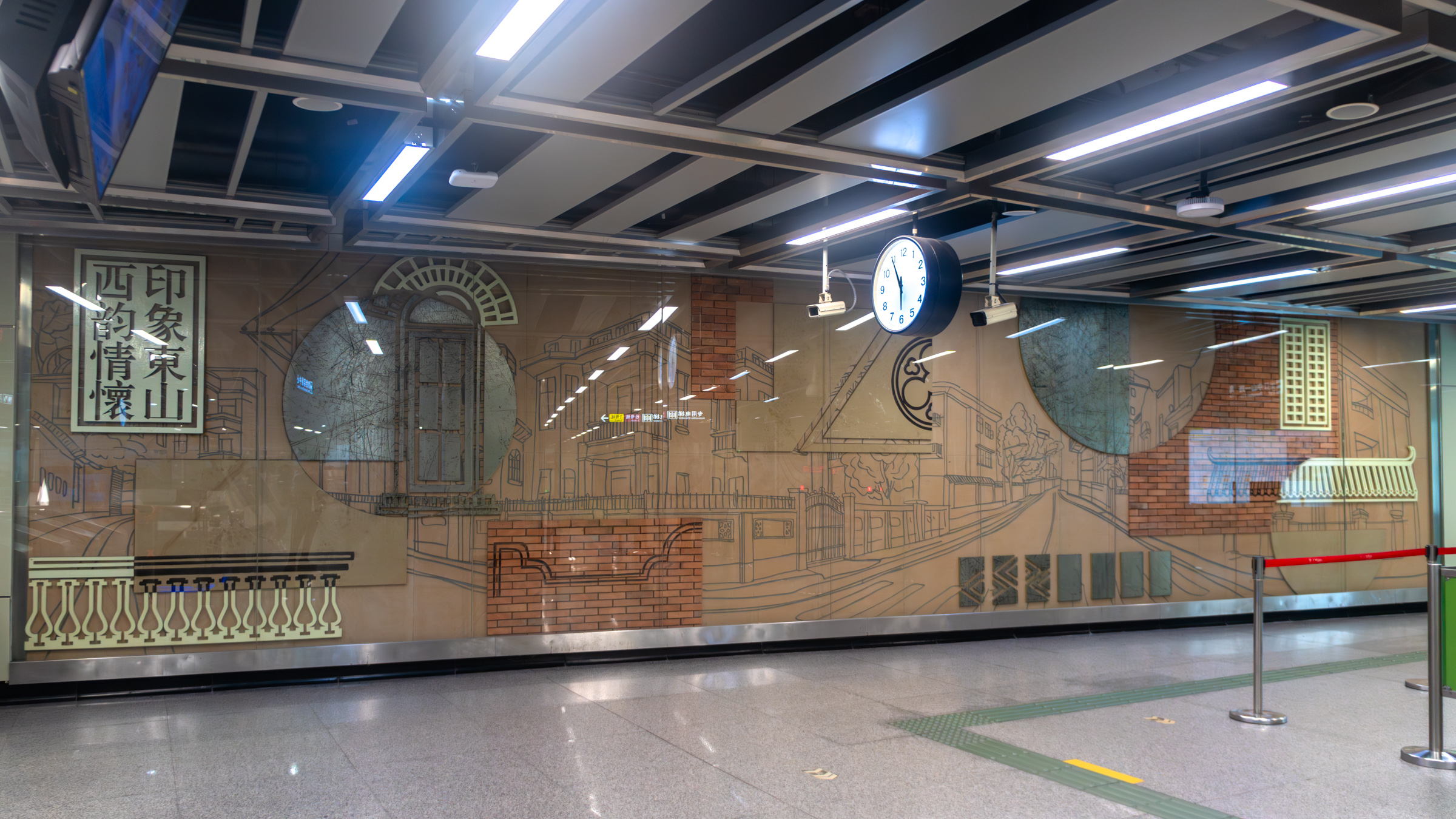
Line 6 concourse art wall

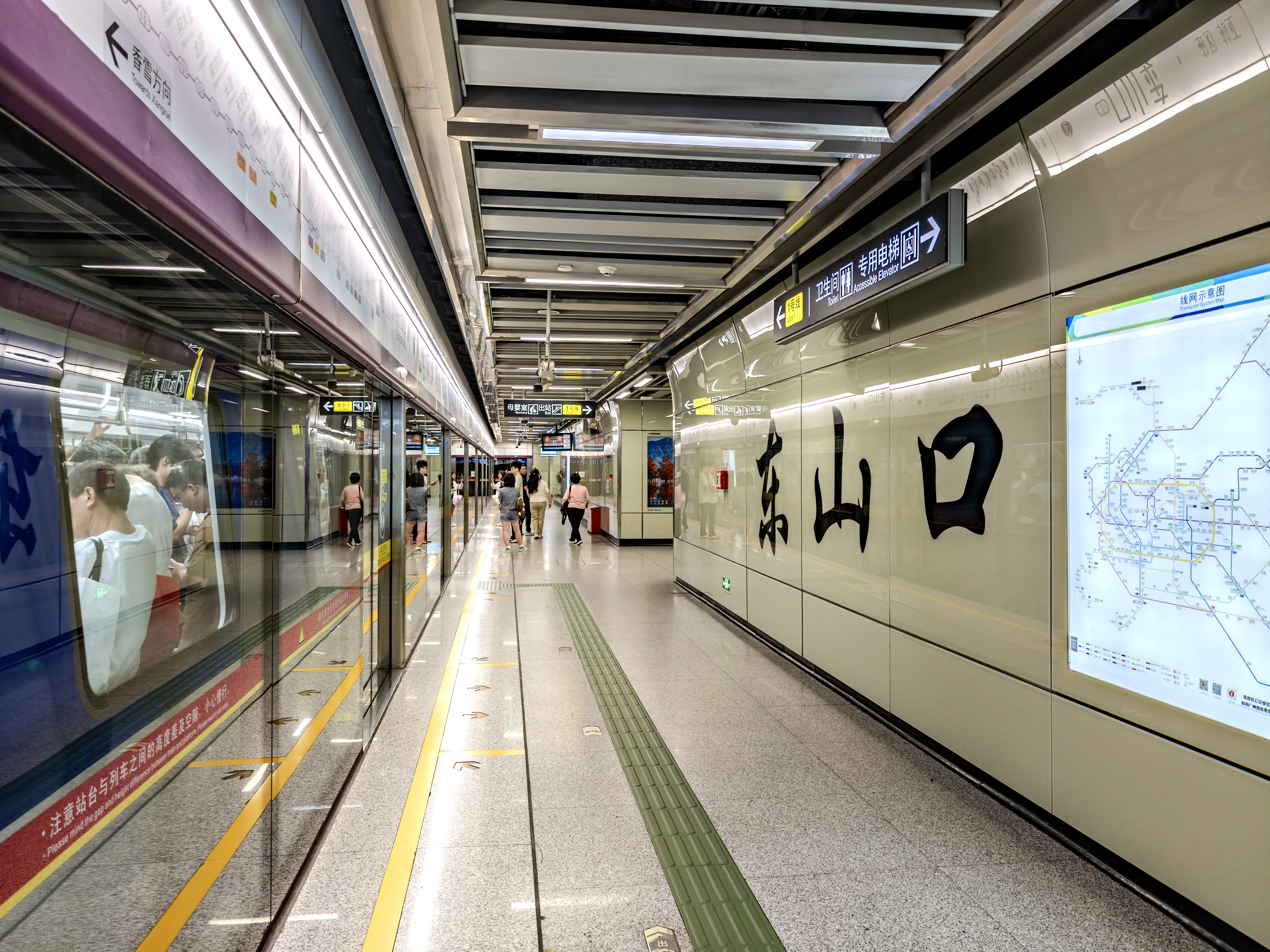
Line 6 platform
