= Taojin station =

Guangzhou Metro station

Coordinates: 23.13639°N 113.2867°E

Taojin 淘金
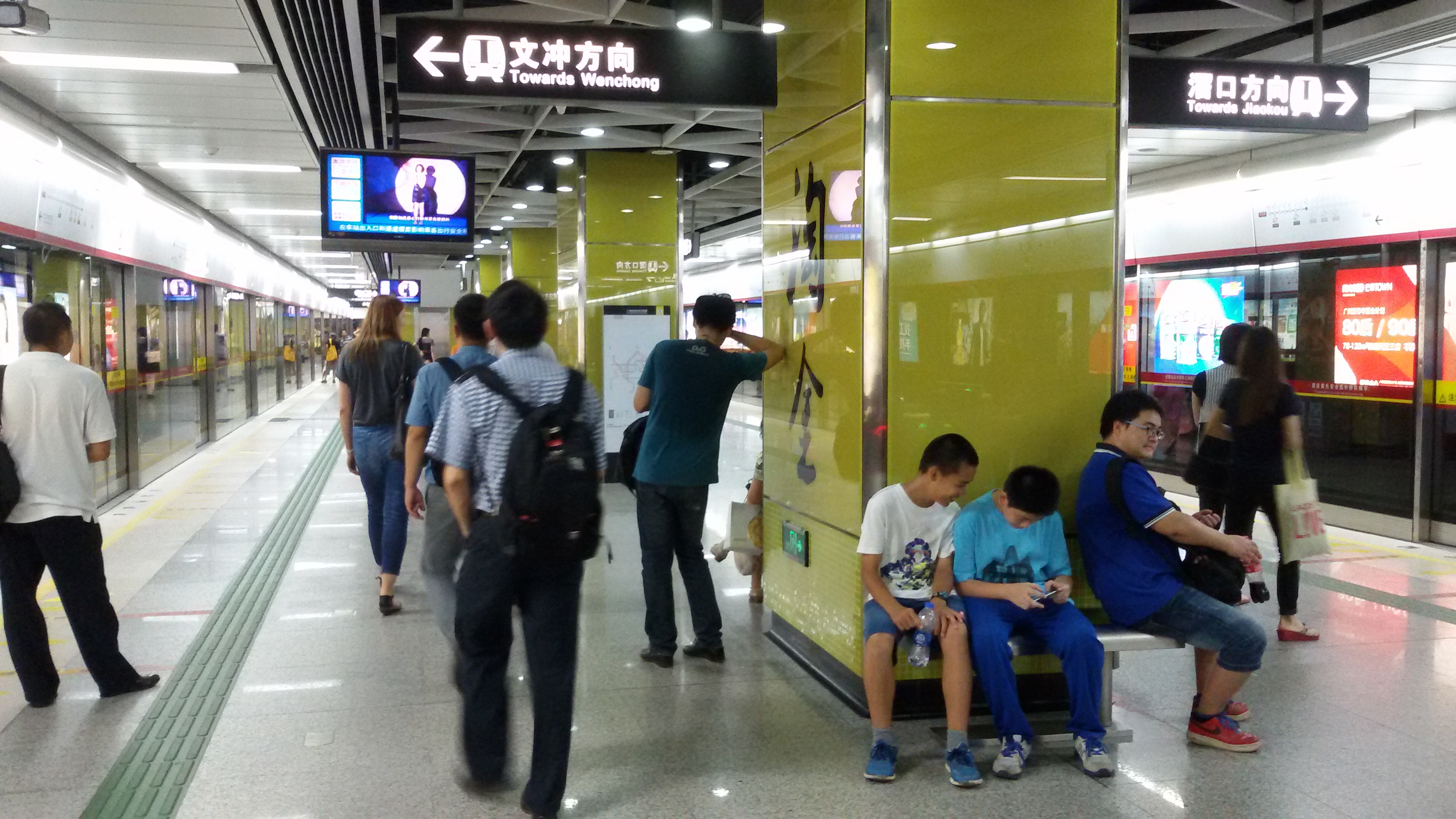

Chinese name
- Chinese: 淘金站
Transcriptions
Standard Mandarin
- Hanyu Pinyin: Táojīn Zhàn
Yue: Cantonese
- Yale Romanization: Tòuhgām Jaahm
- Jyutping: Tou^{4}gam^{1} Zaam^{6}
- Hong Kong Romanization: To Kam station

General information
- Location: Yuexiu District, Guangzhou, Guangdong; China
- Operator: Guangzhou Metro Co. Ltd.
- Lines: Line 5; Line 12 (via Jianshe 6th Road station, opening 2026); Line 13 (via Jianshe 6th Road station, opening 2026)
- Platforms: 2 (1 island platform)

Construction
- Structure type: Underground

Other information
- Station code: 508

History
- Opened: 28 December 2009; 16 years ago

Services
Preceding station	Guangzhou Metro	Following station
Xiaobei towards Jiaokou	Line 5	Ouzhuang towards Huangpu New Port
Transfer at Jianshe 6th Road station (future)
Luhu Lake towards Xunfenggang	Line 12	Martyrs' Park towards Higher Education Mega Center South
Cangbian Road towards Chaoyang	Line 13	Nonglin Lower Road towards Xinsha
Location

Taojin station (Chinese: 淘金站; Jyutping: tou^{4} gam^{1} zaam^{6}; Cantonese Yale: Tòuhgām Jaahm), formerly Garden Hotel station (花园酒店站; 花園酒店站; faa^{1} jyun^{4} zau^{2} dim^{3} zaam^{6}; Fāyùhn Jáudim Jaahm). during planning, is a station on Line 5 of the Guangzhou Metro. It is located under the junction of East Huanshi Road (环市东路) and Taojin Road (淘金路) in the Yuexiu District, near the Garden and Baiyun Hotels. It opened on 28 December 2009.

By 2026, it will be connected to Jianshe 6th Road station on Lines 12 and 13, making it the first transfer hub in Guangzhou Metro network to connect two stations with different names.
