= Zoo station (Guangzhou Metro) =

Guangzhou Metro station

Coordinates: 23.1344°N 113.3073°E

Zoo 动物园
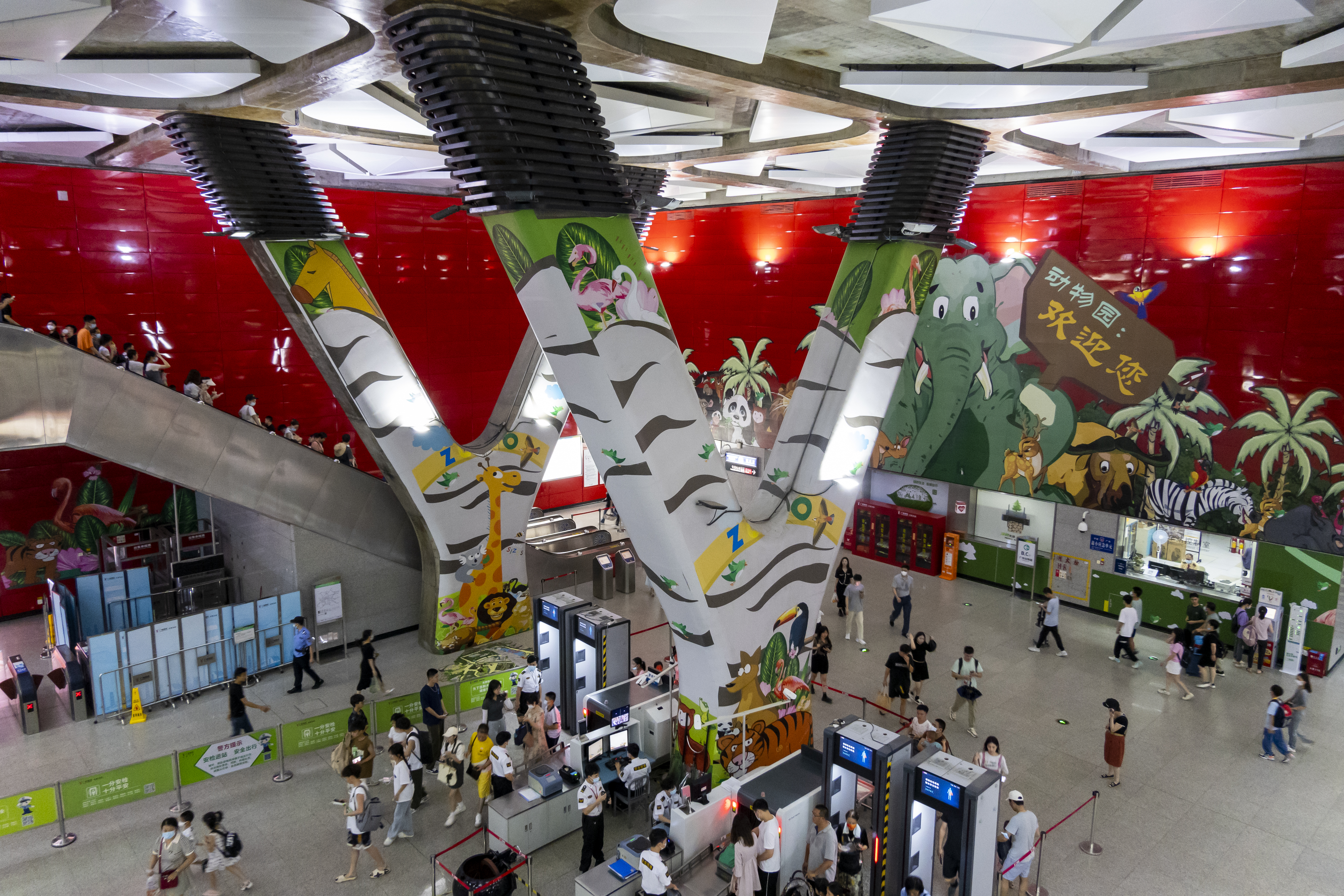

Chinese name
- Simplified Chinese: 动物园站
- Traditional Chinese: 動物園站
Transcriptions
Standard Mandarin
- Hanyu Pinyin: Dòngwùyuán Zhàn
Yue: Cantonese
- Yale Romanization: Duhngmaht'yùhn Jaahm
- Jyutping: Dung^{6}mat^{6}jyun^{4} Zaam^{6}

General information
- Location: Yuexiu District, Guangzhou, Guangdong; China
- Operated by: Guangzhou Metro Co. Ltd.
- Line: Line 5
- Platforms: 2 (2 side platforms)

Construction
- Structure type: Underground

Other information
- Station code: 510

History
- Opened: 28 December 2009; 16 years ago

Services
Preceding station	Guangzhou Metro	Following station
Ouzhuang towards Jiaokou	Line 5	Yangji towards Huangpu New Port
Location

Zoo Station (simplified Chinese: 动物园站; traditional Chinese: 動物園站; Cantonese Yale: Duhngmaht'yùhn Jaahm), formerly planned to be called Guangzhou Zoo South Entrance Station (动物园南门站; 動物園南門站; Duhngmaht'yùhn Nàahmmùhn Jaahm), is a station on Line 5 of the Guangzhou Metro. It is located below the junction of Tianhe Road (天河路), East Huanshi Road and Shuiyin Road in the Yuexiu District, near the south gate of Guangzhou Zoological Garden (广州动物园). It opened on 28 December 2009.

Zoo Station was not in the original plan but was added later, between Ouzhuang Station and Yangji Station after a request by Guangzhou citizens. Due to space limitations it is designed on three levels like Hong Kong MTR stations. The top underground floor is the concourse, below that is the platform for trains towards Huangpu New Port Station and the lowest level is for trains towards Jiaokou Station. It is the first station in Guangzhou Metro system to have this Hong Kong-style multilevel design.
