= Yangji =

Former village in Guangzhou, China

Coordinates: 23.1266°N 113.3132°E

- Traditional Chinese: 楊箕村
- Simplified Chinese: 杨箕村
- Literal meaning: Yangji Village
Transcriptions
Standard Mandarin
- Hanyu Pinyin: Yángjī Cūn
Yue: Cantonese
- Jyutping: Joeng^{4-2} Gei^{1} Cyun^{1}

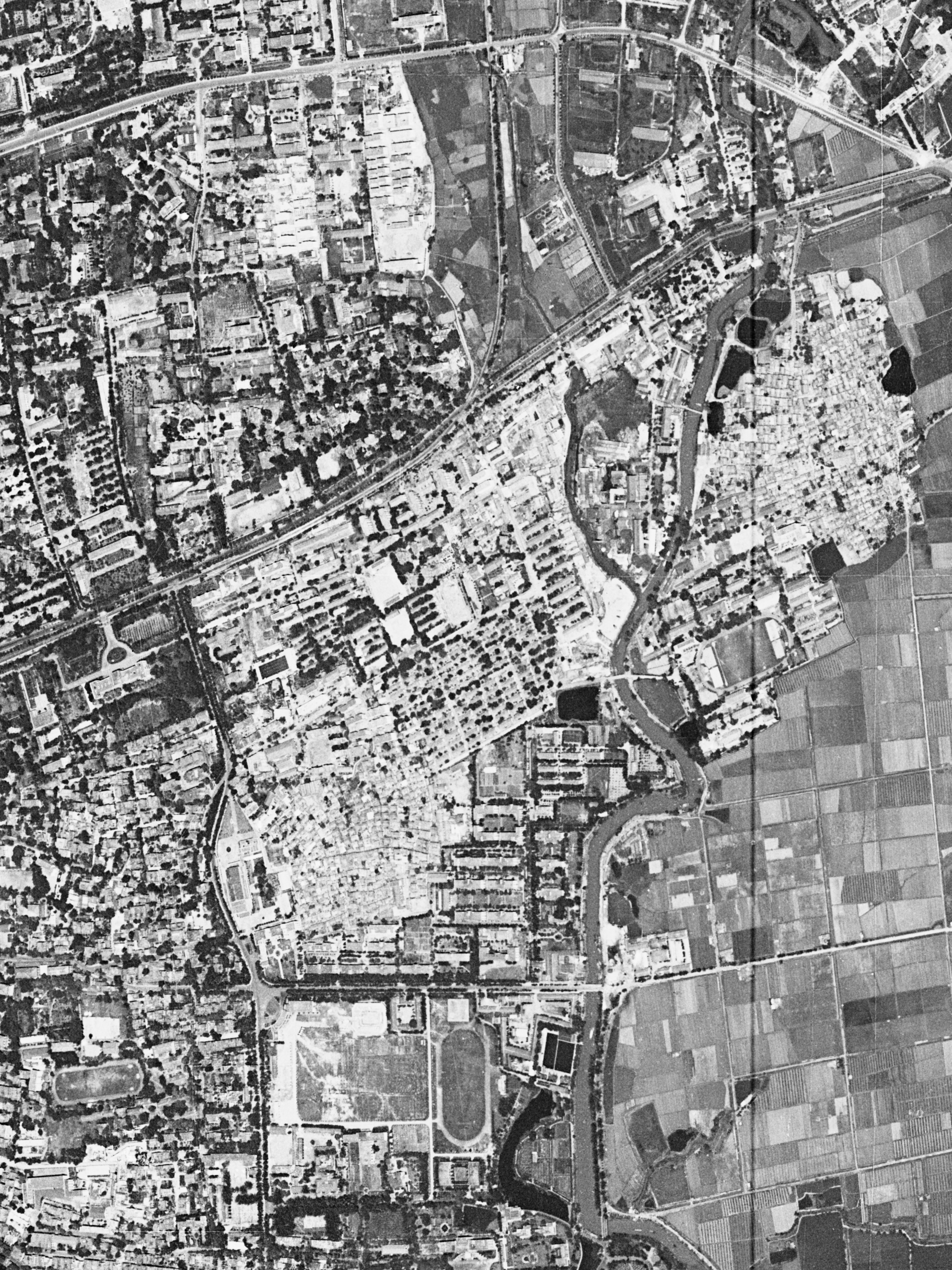

Yangji was a village in the Yuexiu District of Guangzhou City, Guangdong Province, China, which was demolished in 2010 and is now planned to be rebuilt as a 'new community'.

== Demolition ==
As the city of Guangzhou developed, Yangji was surrounded by newly built skyscrapers in Zhujiang New Town and Wuyang New Town and became incompatible with them with frequent cases of robbery and theft reported in the village . As a result, plans were made for its demolition in 2010. This started on July 1 of that year.

== Transportation ==
- Guangzhou Metro: 1 5 Yangji Station
