= Yangji station =

Guangzhou Metro interchange station

Yangji 杨箕
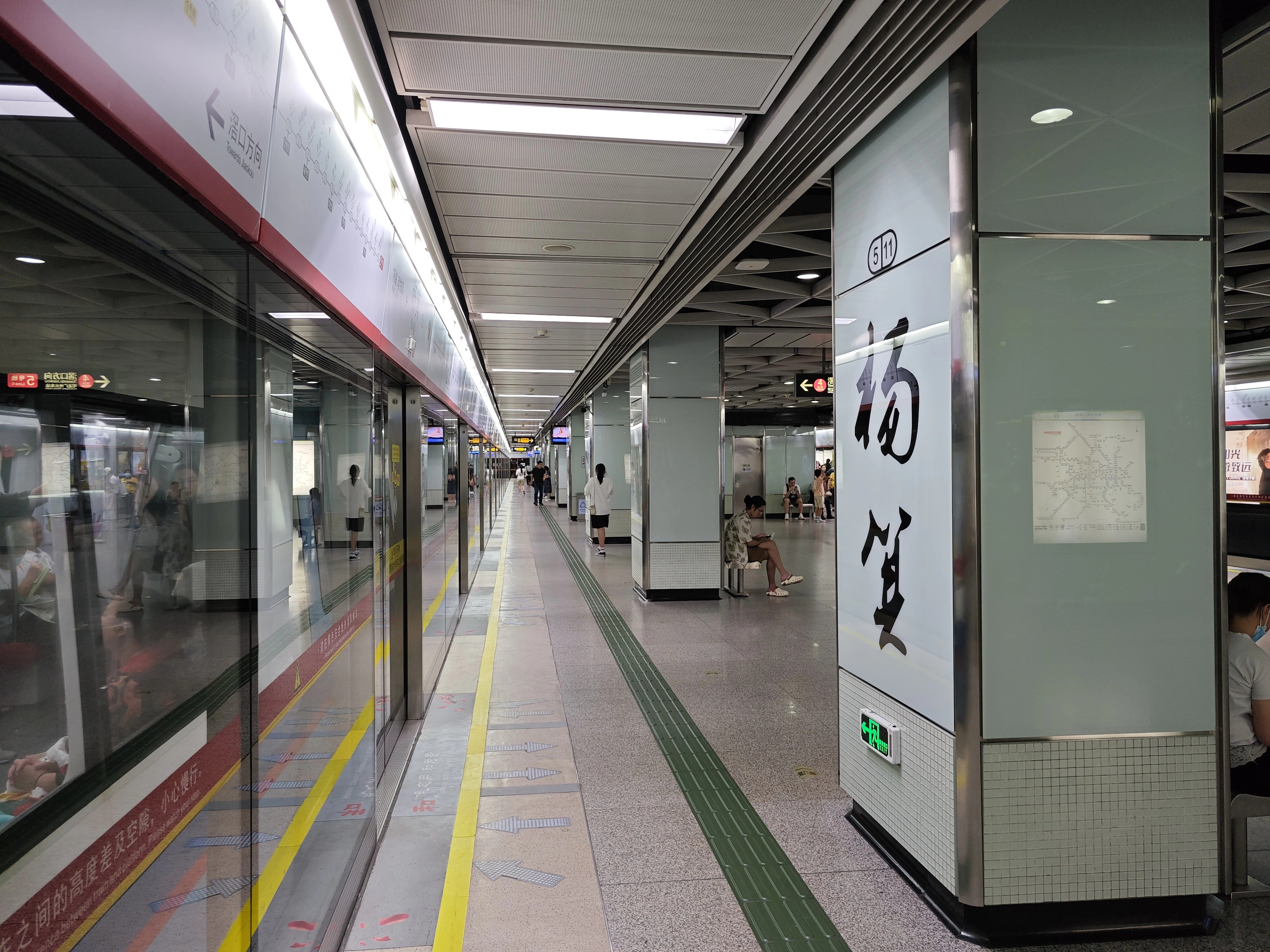
- Platform 4 (Line 5 towards Jiaokou)

Chinese name
- Simplified Chinese: 杨箕站
- Traditional Chinese: 楊箕站
Transcriptions
Standard Mandarin
- Hanyu Pinyin: Yángjī Zhàn
Yue: Cantonese
- Yale Romanization: Yéunggēi Jaahm
- Jyutping: Joeng^{2}gei^{1} Zaam^{6}
- Hong Kong Romanization: Yeung Kei station

General information
- Location: Zhongshan First Road and Meidong Road (梅东路); Yuexiu District, Guangzhou, Guangdong; China
- Coordinates: 23.1278°N 113.3074°E
- Operator: Guangzhou Metro Co. Ltd.
- Lines: Line 1; Line 5
- Platforms: 4 (2 island platforms)
- Tracks: 4

Construction
- Structure type: Underground
- Accessible: Yes

Other information
- Station code: 113 511

History
- Opened: 28 June 1999; 27 years ago (Line 1); 28 December 2009; 16 years ago (Line 5)

Services
Preceding station	Guangzhou Metro	Following station
Dongshankou towards Xilang	Line 1	Tiyu Xilu towards Guangzhou East Railway Station
Zoo towards Jiaokou	Line 5	Wuyangcun towards Huangpu New Port
Location

Yangji Station (simplified Chinese: 杨箕站; traditional Chinese: 楊箕站; Jyutping: joeng2 gei1 zaam6; Cantonese Yale: Yéunggēi Jaahm) is an interchange station between Line 1 and Line 5 of the Guangzhou Metro. It started operations on 28 June 1999 and is situated under Zhongshan 1st Road (中山一路) in Guangzhou's Yuexiu District, near Yangji Village.

== Station layout ==
G	Street level	Exits A-F
L1; Concourse	Line 1 Lobby	Ticket Machines, Customer Service, Shops, Police Station, Safety Facilities
L1; Concourse	Transfer Lobby	Customer Service, Vending machines, Transfer passageway between Lines 1 & 5
L1; Concourse	Line 5 Lobby	Ticket Machines, Customer Service, Shops, Police Station, Safety Facilities
L2; Platforms	Platform 2	1 towards Xilang (Dongshankou)
L2; Platforms	Island platform, doors will open on the left
L2; Platforms	Platform 1	1 towards Guangzhou East Railway Station (Tiyu Xilu)
L3; Platforms	Platform 4	5 towards Jiaokou (Zoo)
L3; Platforms	Island platform, doors will open on the left
L3; Platforms	Platform 3	5 towards Huangpu New Port (Wuyangcun)

== Exits ==
Exit number		Exit location
Exit A		Zhongshan Yilu
Exit B		Zhongshan Yilu Interchange
Exit C		Zhongshan Yilu
Exit D		Zhongshan Yilu
Exit E	E1	Meidong Lu
Exit F		Gonghe Donglu

== Gallery ==
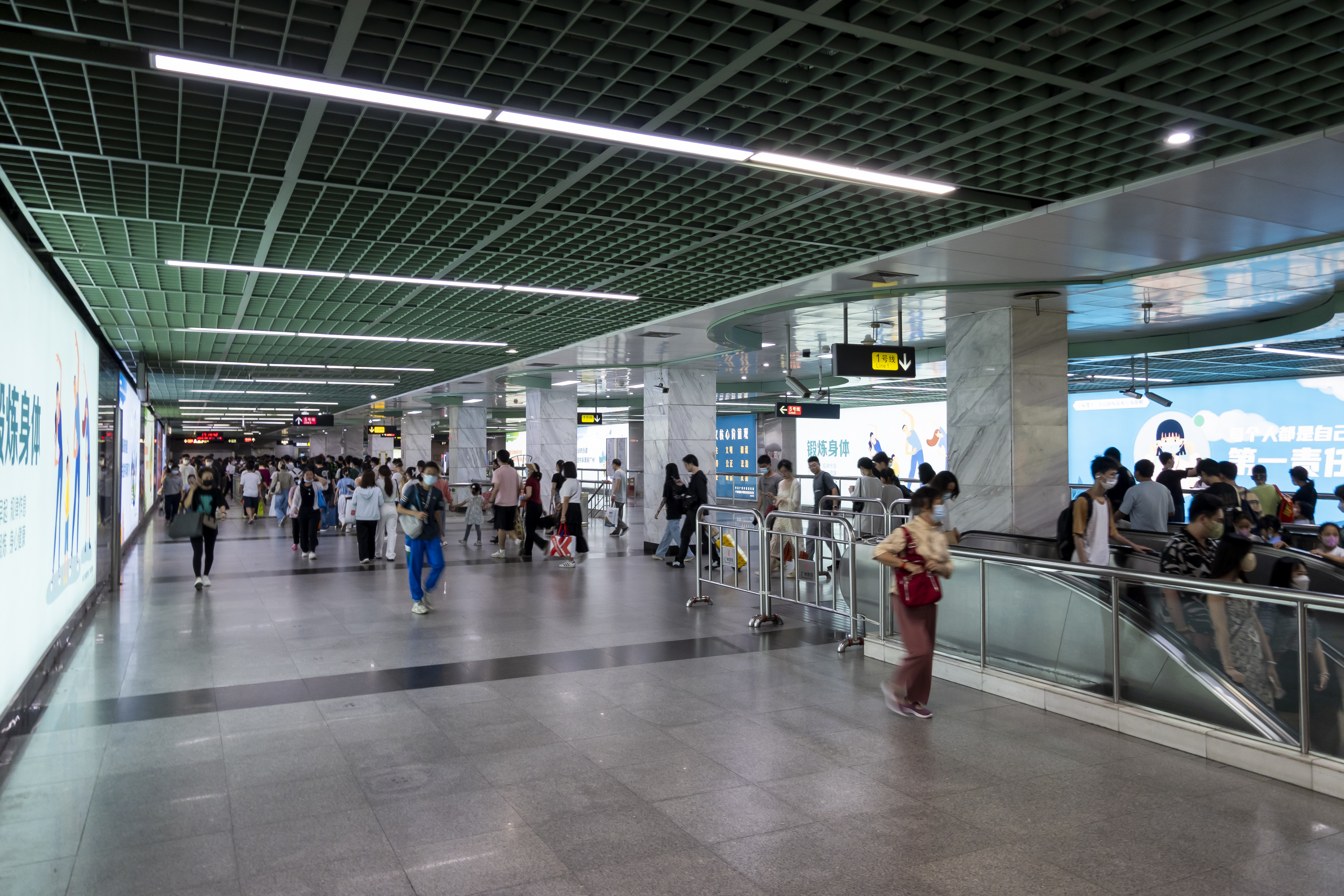
Line 1 concourse

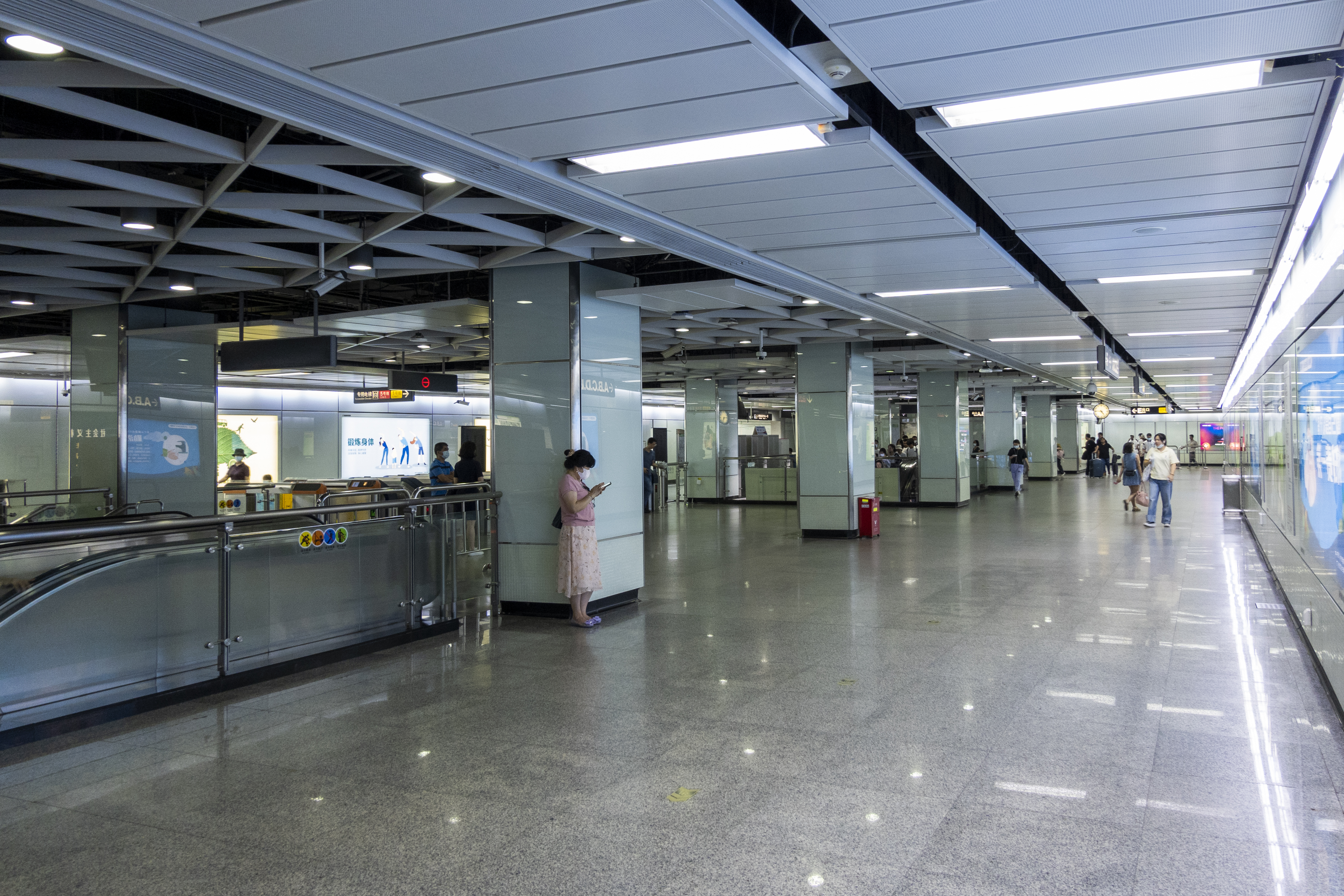
Line 5 concourse

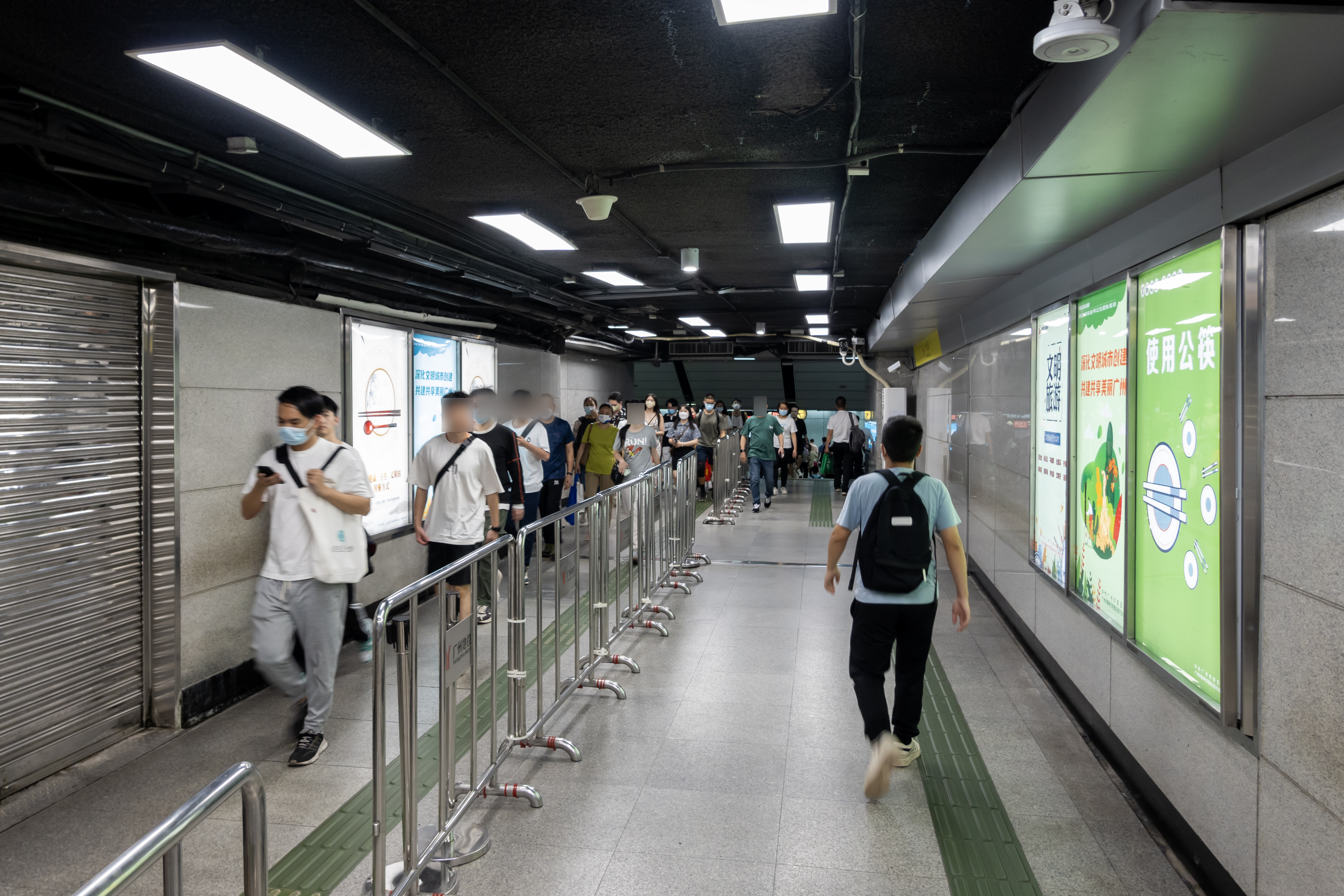
Transfer corridor

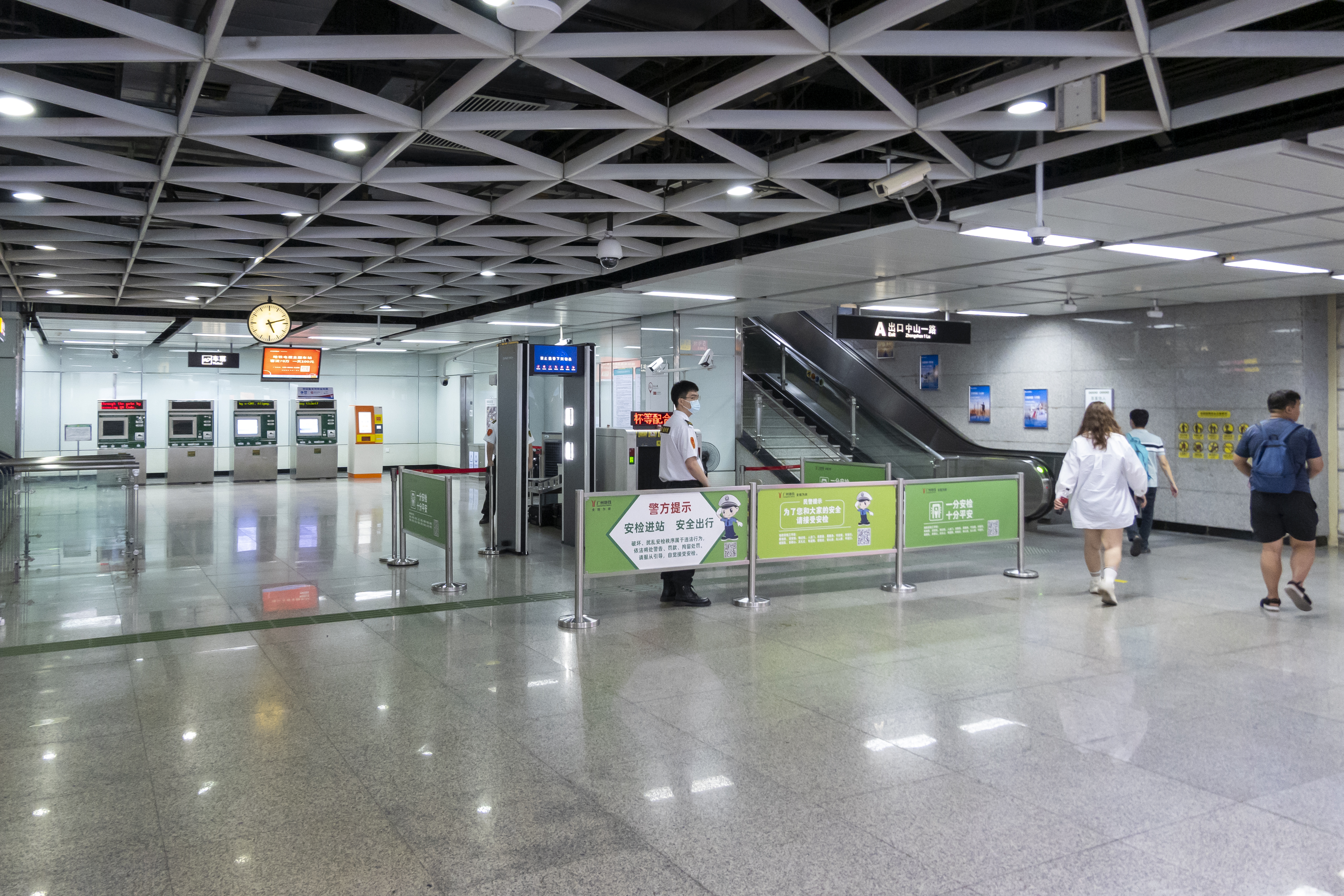
Concourse of Exit A

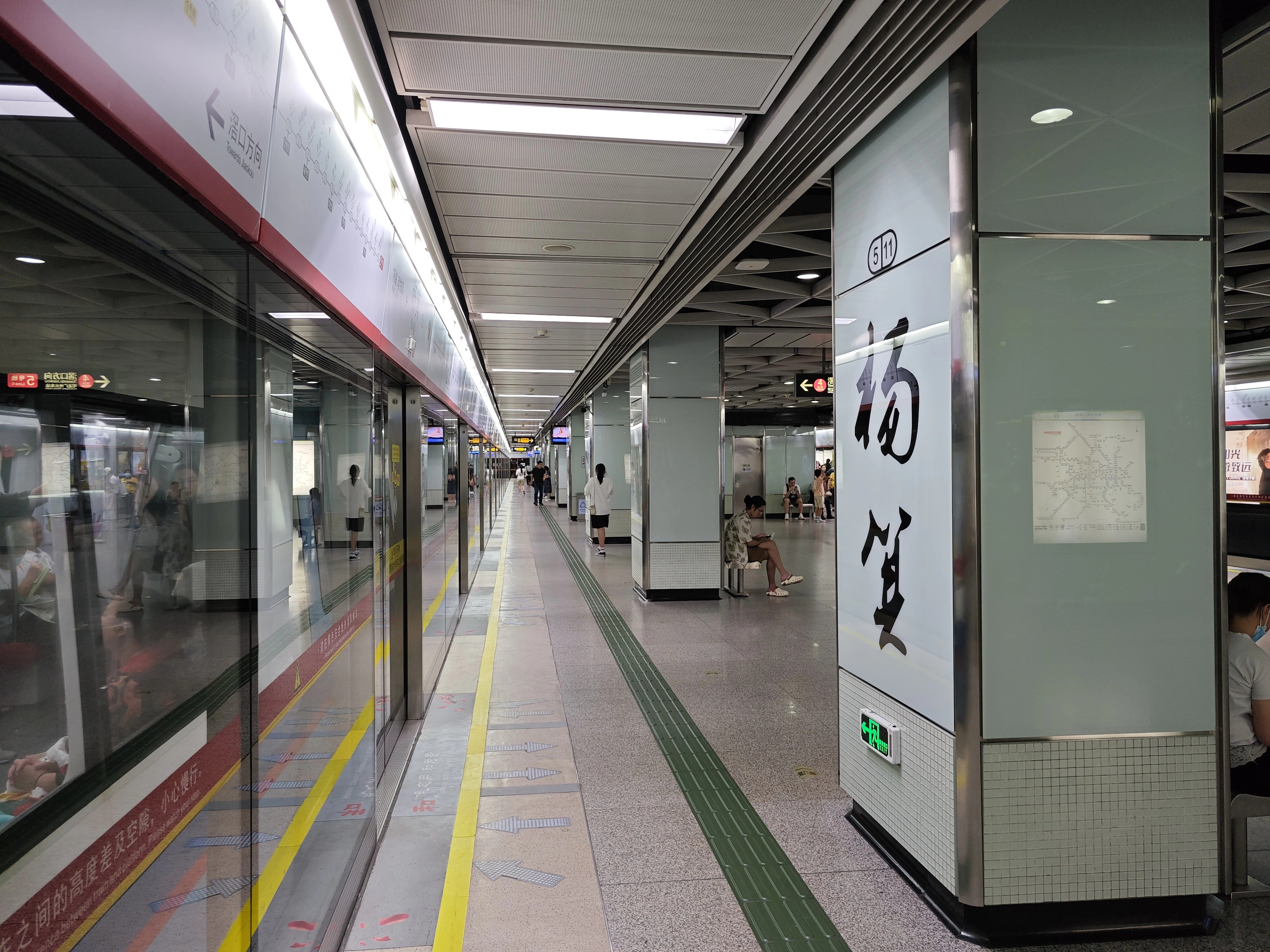
Platform 4

== See also ==
- Yangji East station, a Guangzhou Metro Line 10 station located to the east of Yangji
