= Xiaobei station =

Guangzhou Metro station

Coordinates: 23.1394°N 113.2764°E

Xiaobei 小北
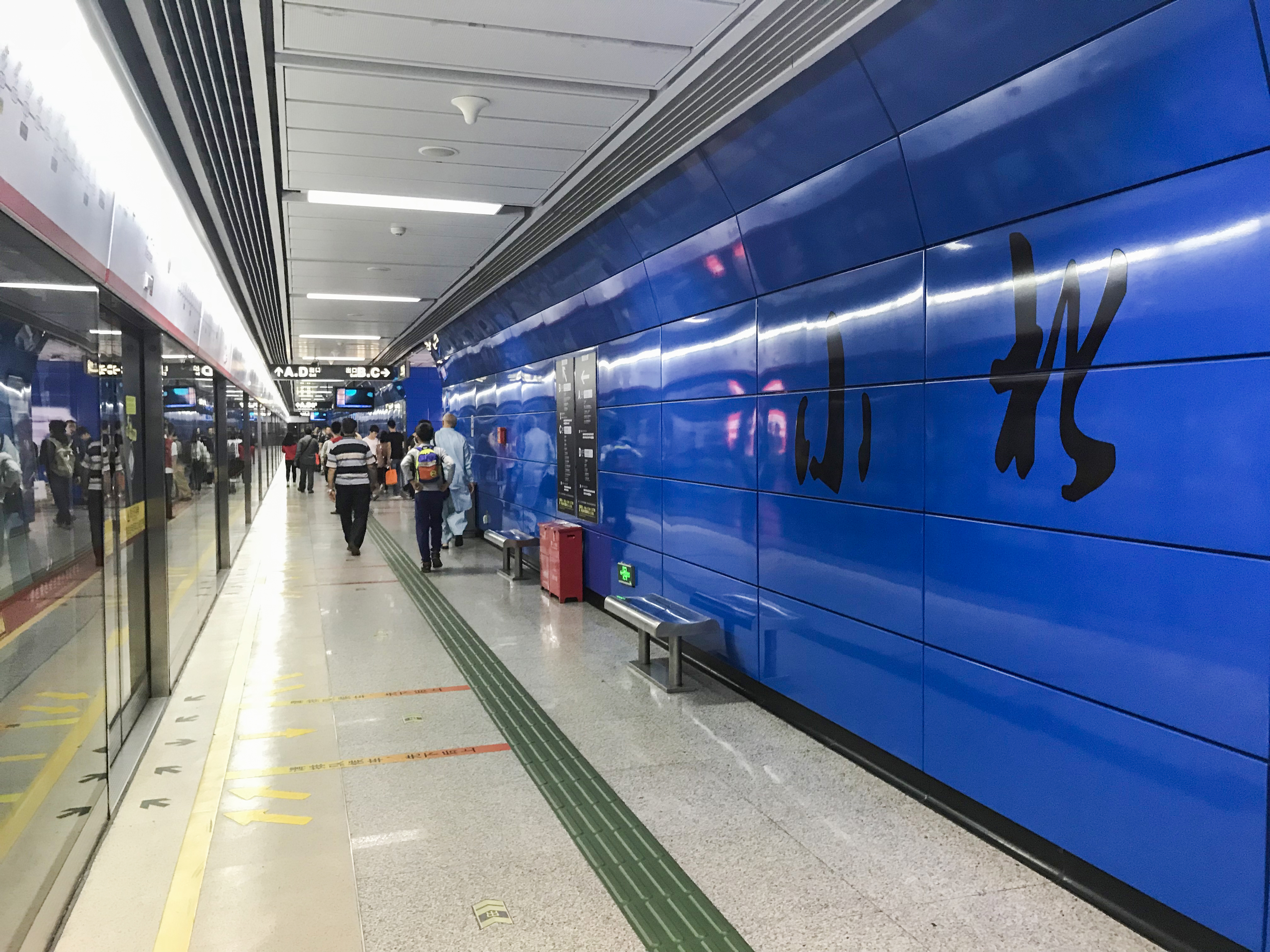

Chinese name
- Chinese: 小北站
Transcriptions
Standard Mandarin
- Hanyu Pinyin: Xiǎoběi Zhàn
Yue: Cantonese
- Yale Romanization: Síubāk Jaahm
- Jyutping: Siu^{2}bak^{1} Zaam^{6}
- Hong Kong Romanization: Siu Pak station

General information
- Location: Yuexiu District, Guangzhou, Guangdong; China
- Operated by: Guangzhou Metro Co. Ltd.
- Line: Line 5
- Platforms: 2 (2 side platforms)

Construction
- Structure type: Underground

Other information
- Station code: 507

History
- Opened: 28 December 2009; 16 years ago

Services
| Preceding station | Guangzhou Metro | Following station |
|---|---|---|
| Guangzhou Railway Station towards Jiaokou | Line 5 | Taojin towards Huangpu New Port |
Location

Xiaobei Station (Chinese: 小北站; Cantonese Yale: Síubāk Jaahm) is a station on Line 5 of the Guangzhou Metro. It is located under East Huanshi Road (环市东路) near the Beixiu Building (北秀大厦) in the Yuexiu District. It opened on 28 December 2009.
