= Martyrs' Park station =

Guangzhou Metro station

Coordinates: 23.12675°N 113.28539°E

Martyrs' Park 烈士陵园
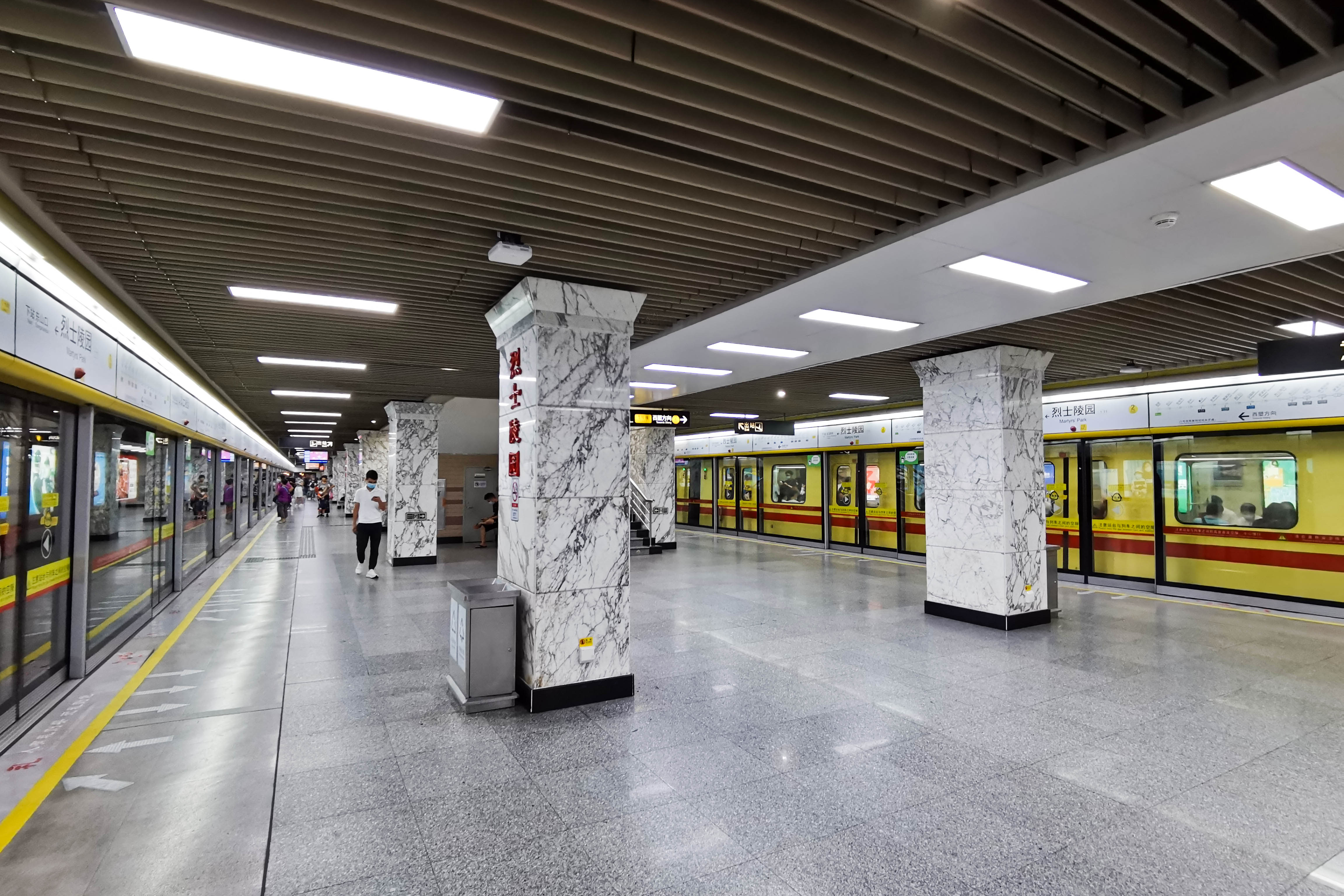
- Line 1 platform

Chinese name
- Simplified Chinese: 烈士陵园站
- Traditional Chinese: 烈士陵園站
Transcriptions
Standard Mandarin
- Hanyu Pinyin: Lièshì Língyuán Zhàn
Yue: Cantonese
- Jyutping: lit^{6}si^{6} ling^{4}jyun^{4} zaam^{6}

General information
- Location: Yuexiu District, Guangzhou, Guangdong; China
- Operated by: Guangzhou Metro Co. Ltd.
- Lines: Line 1; Line 12 (opening 2026)
- Platforms: 2 (1 island platform)

Construction
- Structure type: Underground
- Accessible: Yes

Other information
- Station code: 111

History
- Opened: June 28, 1999; 26 years ago

Services
Preceding station	Guangzhou Metro	Following station
Peasant Movement Institute towards Xilang	Line 1	Dongshankou towards Guangzhou East Railway Station
Future services
Jianshe 6th Road towards Xunfenggang	Line 12	Donghu towards Higher Education Mega Center South
Location

Martyrs' Park Station (simplified Chinese: 烈士陵园站; traditional Chinese: 烈士陵園站; Jyutping: lit6 si6 ling4 jyun4 zaam6; Cantonese Yale: Lihtsih Lìhng'yùhn Jaahm) is a station on Line 1 of the Guangzhou Metro that started operations on 28 June 1997. It is located at the under the junction of Zhongshan 3rd Road and Jiaochang Road East (较场东路) in the Yuexiu District of Guangzhou. It is named "Martyrs' Park Station" because of the nearby Guangzhou Martyrs' Memorial Garden or Guangzhou Martyrs' Memorial Cemetery (广州起义烈士陵园), a park dedicated to those who fought and died in the 1927 Guangzhou Uprising by the Chinese communists against the Kuomintang.

== Station layout ==
G	-	Exit
L1; Concourse	Lobby	Customer Service, Shops, Vending machines, ATMs
L2; Platforms	Platform 2	1 towards Xilang (Peasant Movement Institute)
L2; Platforms	Island platform, doors will open on the left
L2; Platforms	Platform 1	1 towards Guangzhou East Railway Station (Dongshankou)

== Incidents ==
On December 25, 2025, a power bank fire was reported here on a train to Guangzhou East Railway Station. The train was evacuated and was under control.

== Exits ==
Exit number		Exit location
Exit A		Zhongshan Sanlu
Exit B	B1	Zhongshan Sanlu
Exit B	B2	Zhongshan Sanlu
Exit B	B3	Dongchuan Lu
Exit C		Zhongshan Sanlu
Exit D		Zhongshan Sanlu
