= Ouzhuang station =

Guangzhou Metro interchange station

Ouzhuang 区庄
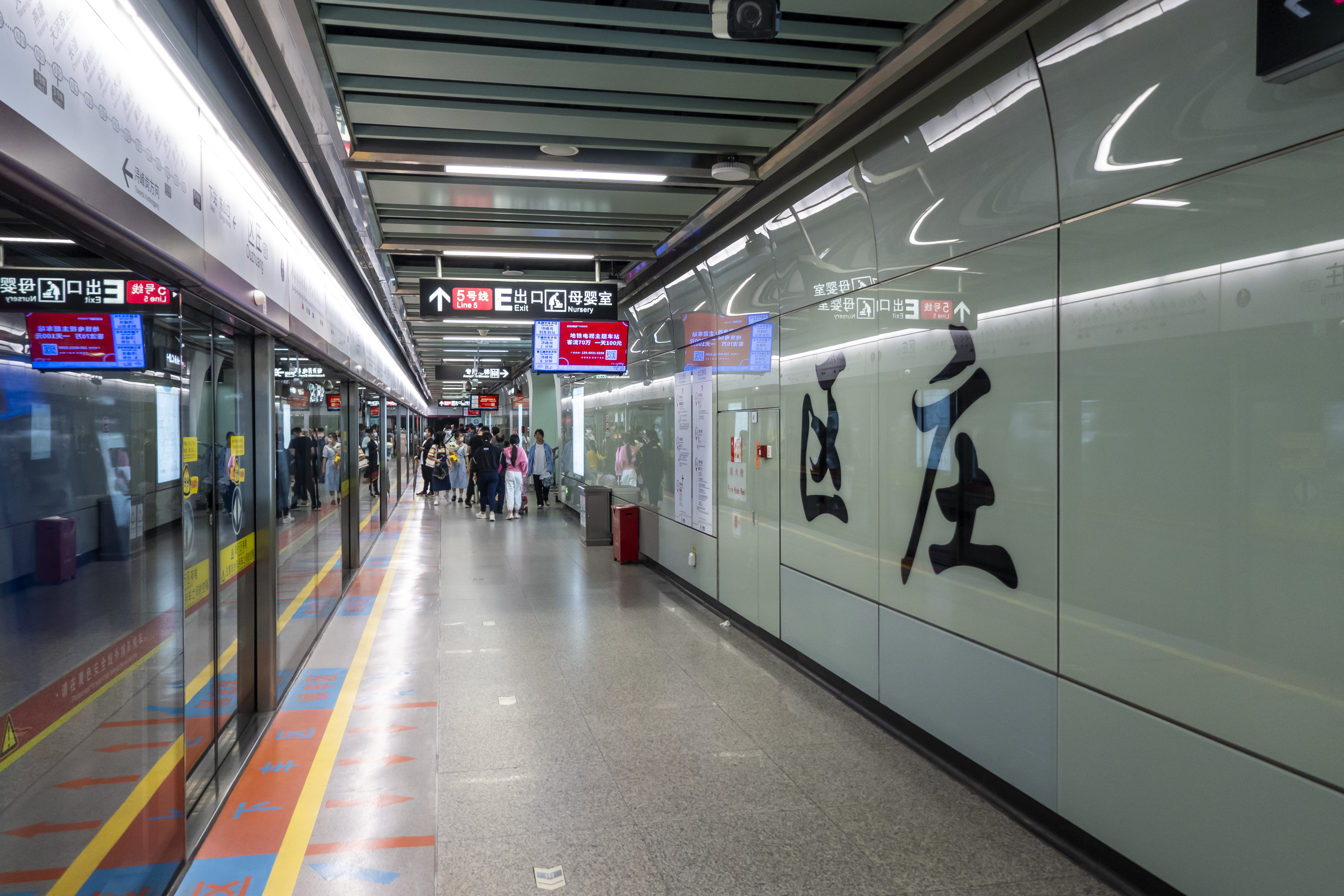
- Platform 4 (Line 6 towards Xunfenggang)

Chinese name
- Simplified Chinese: 区庄站
- Traditional Chinese: 區莊站
Transcriptions
Standard Mandarin
- Hanyu Pinyin: Ōuzhuāng Zhàn
Yue: Cantonese
- Yale Romanization: Āujōng Jaahm
- Jyutping: Au^{1}zong^{1} Zaam^{6}

General information
- Location: Yuexiu District, Guangzhou, Guangdong; China
- Coordinates: 23.1345°N 113.2966°E
- Operated by: Guangzhou Metro Co. Ltd.
- Lines: Line 5; Line 6
- Platforms: 4 (2 split island platforms)
- Tracks: 4

Construction
- Structure type: Underground
- Accessible: Yes

Other information
- Station code: 509 615

History
- Opened: 28 December 2009; 16 years ago (Line 5); 28 December 2013; 12 years ago (Line 6)

Services
Preceding station	Guangzhou Metro	Following station
Taojin towards Jiaokou	Line 5	Zoo towards Huangpu New Port
Dongshankou towards Xunfenggang	Line 6	Huanghuagang towards Xiangxue
Location

Ouzhuang Station (simplified Chinese: 区庄站; traditional Chinese: 區莊站; Cantonese Yale: Āujōng Jaahm) is an interchange station between Line 5 and Line 6 of the Guangzhou Metro in the Yuexiu District of Guangzhou. It is located under the junction of East Huanshi Road (环市东路) and Nonglinxia Road (农林下路), It opened on 28 December 2009.

== Station layout ==
G Concourse	North Lobby	Exit E, Ticket Machines, Police Station, Safety Facilities
G Concourse	-	Exits A-D
L1; Concourse	North Lobby	Ticket Machines, Customer Service, Baby Change, Safety Facilities
L1; Concourse	Passageway	Passageway to South Lobby
L2; Equipment Area	-	Station equipment
L3; Line 5 Platforms	Platform 2	5 towards Jiaokou (Taojin)
L3; Line 5 Platforms	Side platform, doors will open on the left
L3; Line 5 Platforms	Pedestrian Passageway	Passage linking Line 5 platforms
L3; Line 5 Platforms	Side platform, doors will open on the left
L3; Line 5 Platforms	Platform 1	5 towards Huangpu New Port (Zoo)
L4; Concourse	Transfer Passageway	Transfer passageway between Lines 5 & 6
L4; Concourse	South Lobby	Ticket Machines, Customer Service, Safety Facilities
L4; Concourse	Passageway	Passageway to North Lobby
L5; Line 6 Platforms	Platform 4	6 towards Xunfenggang (Dongshankou)
L5; Line 6 Platforms	Side platform, doors will open on the left
L5; Line 6 Platforms	Pedestrian Passageway	Passage linking Line 6 platforms
L5; Line 6 Platforms	Side platform, doors will open on the left
L5; Line 6 Platforms	Platform 3	6 towards Xiangxue (Huanghuagang)

== Exits ==
Exit number		Exit location
Exit A		Huanshi Donglu
Exit B	B1	Nonglin Xialu
Exit B	B2	Nonglin Xialu
Exit C		Huanshi Donglu
Exit D		Huanshi Donglu
Exit E		Huanshi Donglu

== Gallery ==
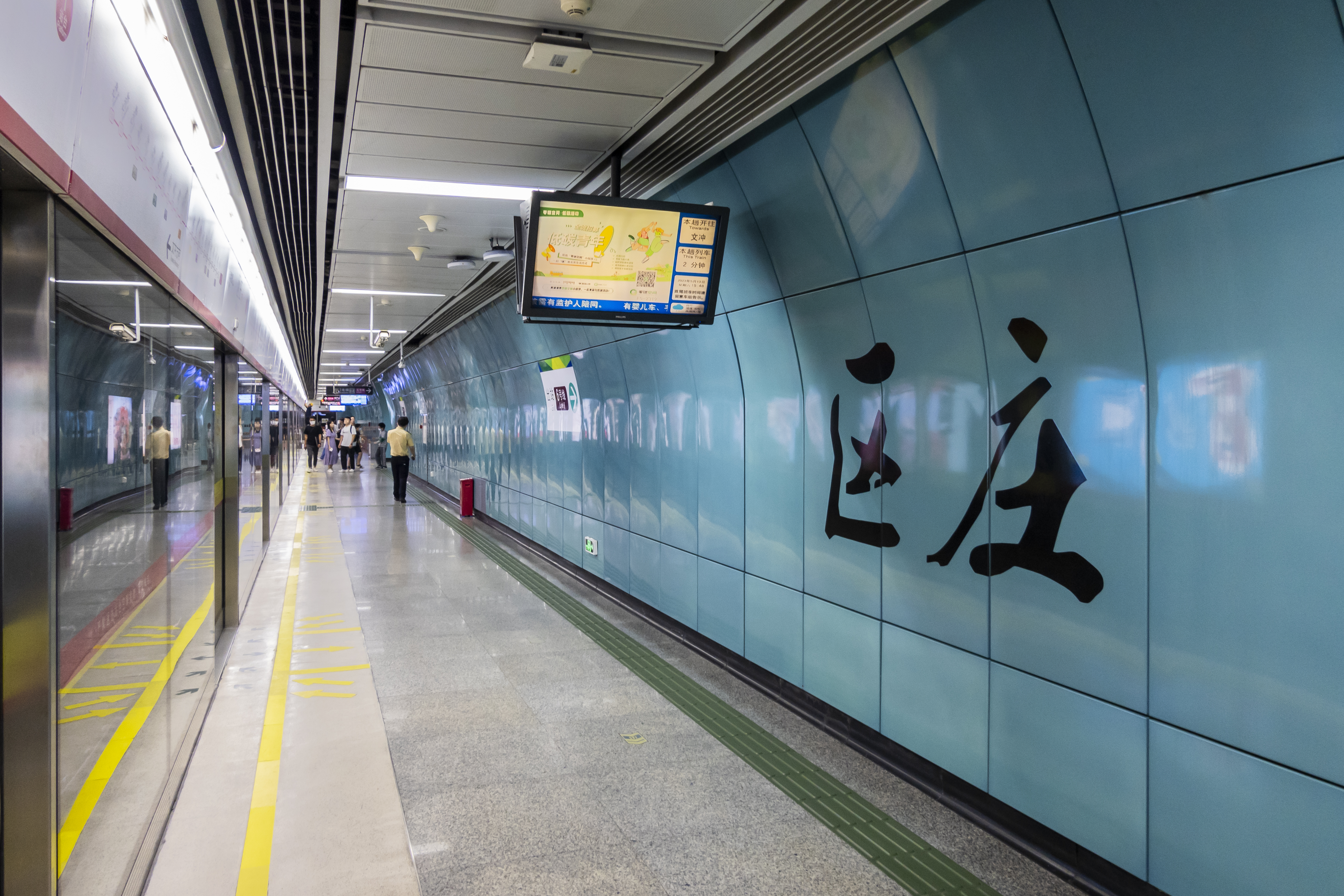
Platform 1 (Line 5 towards Huangpu New Port)

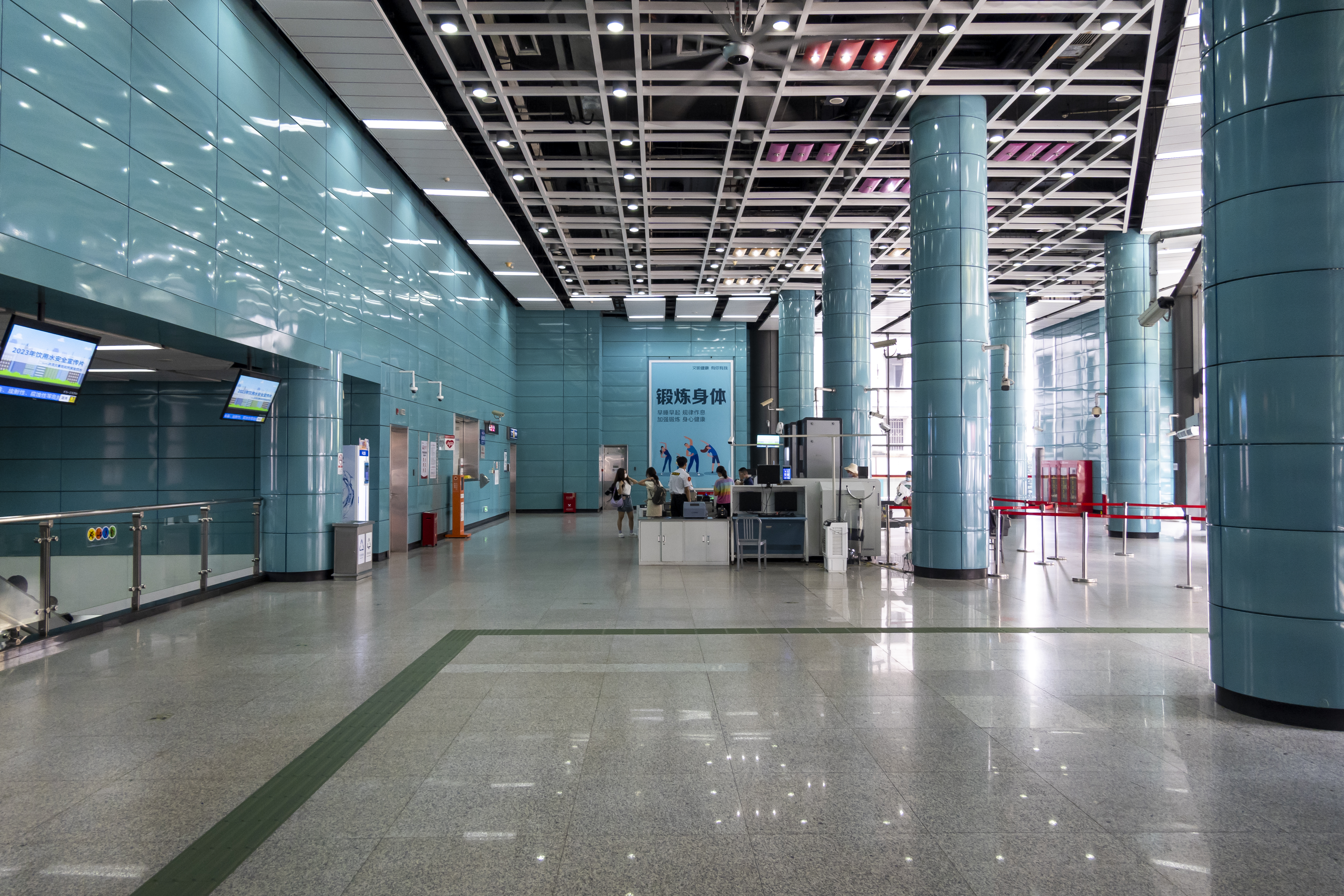
North concourse

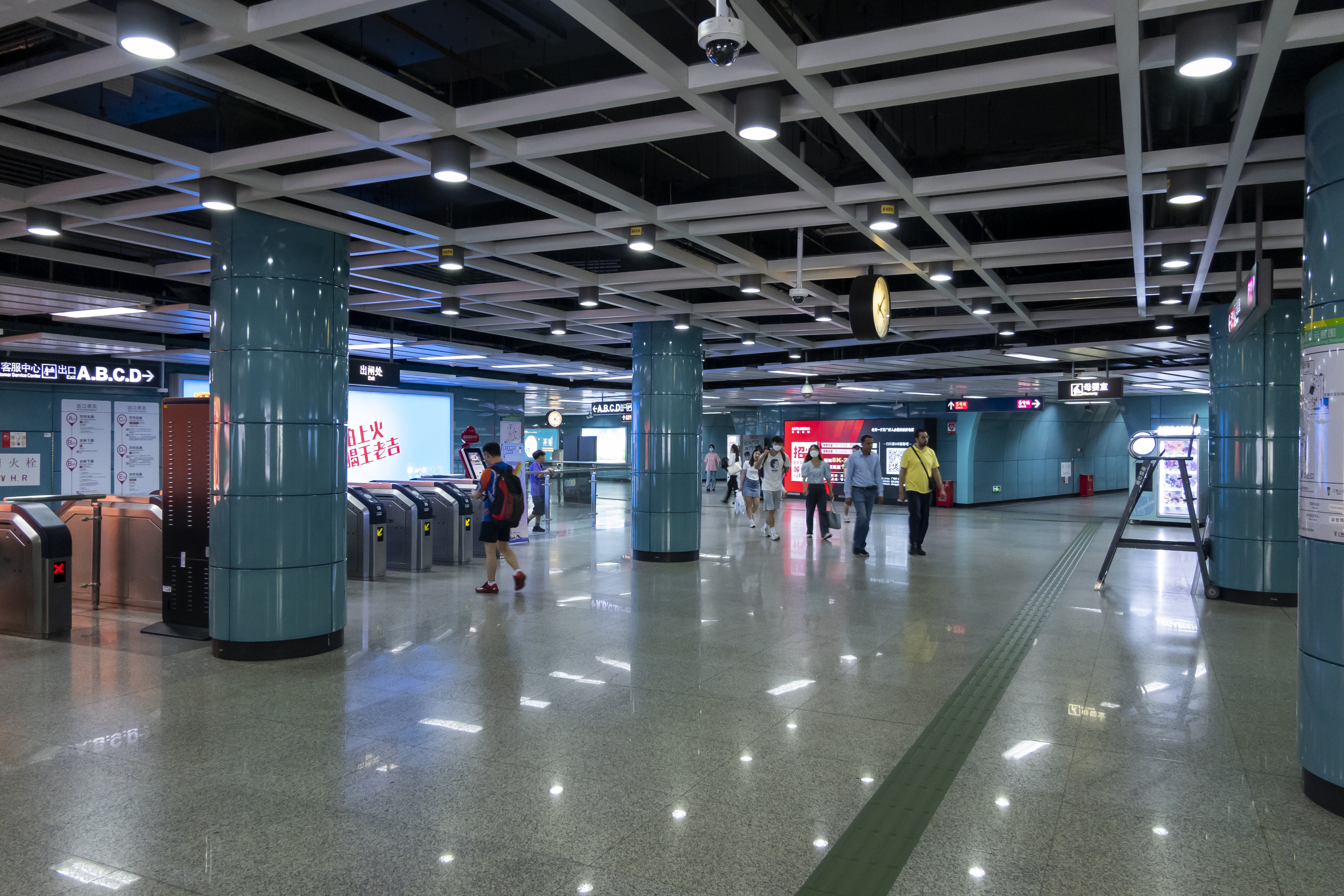
North concourse mezzanine

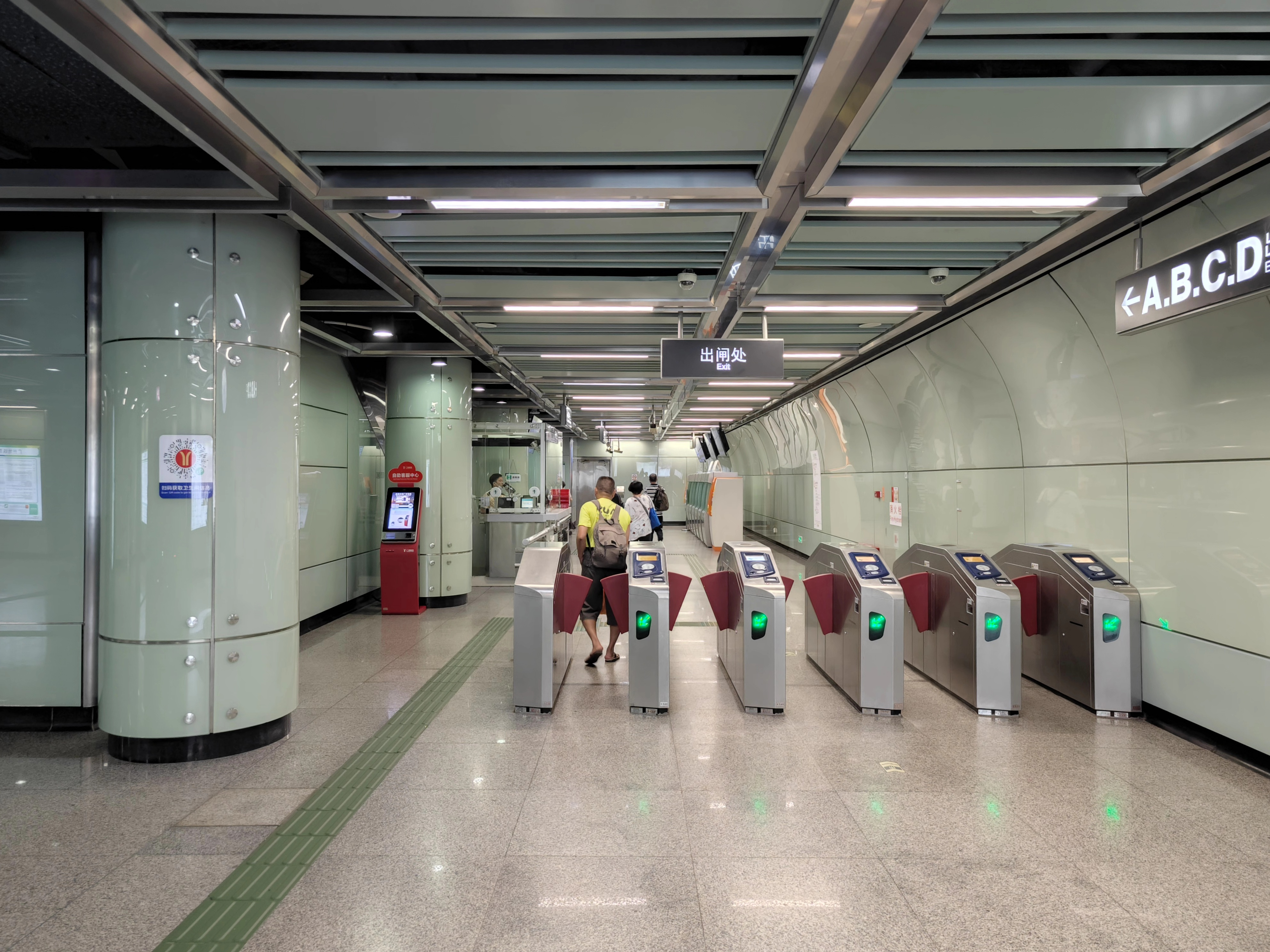
South concourse

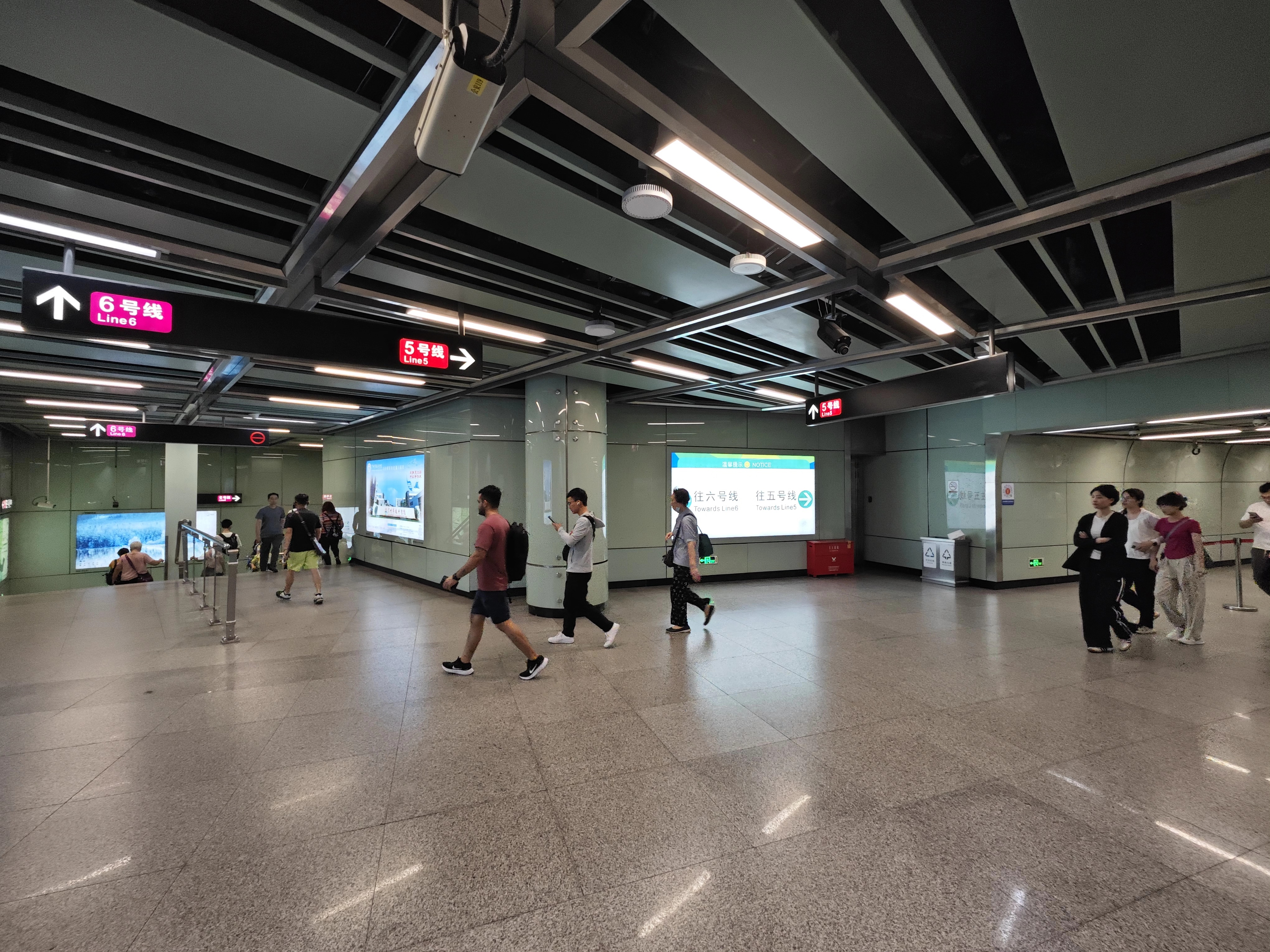
Transfer corridor
