= Dongshan, Guangzhou =

Former district of Guangzhou, China

Coordinates: 23.1243°N 113.2900°E

Dongshan 东山区
- District of China
- 1960–2005
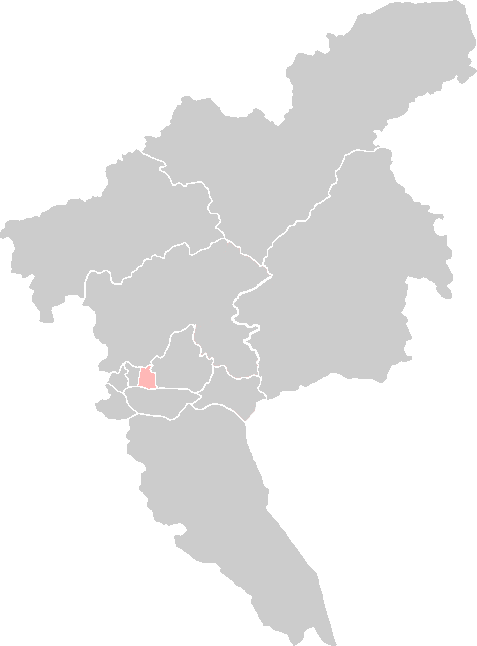
- Location of Dongshan on Guangzhou.
- History
  - Established: 1960
  - Disestablished: 2005
Succeeded by
Yuexiu District
- Today part of: Part of the Yuexiu District

Dongshan District (Chinese: 东山区; Jyutping: dung1 saan1 keoi1) was a former district in Guangzhou, Guangdong, China located to the west of Tianhe District and the east of Yuexiu District. It was the political and cultural centre of Guangdong Province and noted for its high-quality education. The district was established in 1960, then merged with Yuexiu District in 2005.
