= CJK Unified Ideographs (Unicode block) =

- Range: U+4E00..U+9FFF (20,992 code points)
- Plane: BMP
- Scripts: Han
- Assigned: 20,992 code points
- Unused: 0 reserved code points

Unicode Version History
- 1.0.1 (1992): 20,902 (+20,902)
- 4.1 (2005): 20,924 (+22)
- 5.1 (2008): 20,932 (+8)
- 5.2 (2009): 20,940 (+8)
- 6.1 (2012): 20,941 (+1)
- 8.0 (2015): 20,950 (+9)
- 10.0 (2017): 20,971 (+21)
- 11.0 (2018): 20,976 (+5)
- 13.0 (2020): 20,989 (+13)
- 14.0 (2021): 20,992 (+3)

Unicode documentation
- Code chart ∣ Web page

CJK Unified Ideographs is a Unicode block containing the most common CJK ideographs used in modern Chinese, Japanese, Korean and Vietnamese characters. When contrasted with other blocks containing CJK Unified Ideographs, it is also referred to as the Unified Repertoire and Ordering (URO).

The block has hundreds of variation sequences defined for standardized variants.

It also has tens of thousands of ideographic variation sequences registered in the Unicode Ideographic Variation Database (IVD). These sequences specify the desired glyph variant for a given Unicode character.

== Block ==
Chart
This list is a single Unicode block. For an overview of all CJK ideograph blocks in Unicode, see CJK Unified Ideographs.

CJK Unified Ideographs^{[1]} Official Unicode Consortium code chart (PDF)
	0	1	2	3	4	5	6	7	8	9	A	B	C	D	E	F
U+4E0x	一	丁	丂	七	丄	丅	丆	万	丈	三	上	下	丌	不	与	丏
U+4E1x	丐	丑	丒	专	且	丕	世	丗	丘	丙	业	丛	东	丝	丞	丟
U+4E2x	丠	両	丢	丣	两	严	並	丧	丨	丩	个	丫	丬	中	丮	丯
U+4E3x	丰	丱	串	丳	临	丵	丶	丷	丸	丹	为	主	丼	丽	举	丿
U+4E4x	乀	乁	乂	乃	乄	久	乆	乇	么	义	乊	之	乌	乍	乎	乏
U+4E5x	乐	乑	乒	乓	乔	乕	乖	乗	乘	乙	乚	乛	乜	九	乞	也
U+4E6x	习	乡	乢	乣	乤	乥	书	乧	乨	乩	乪	乫	乬	乭	乮	乯
U+4E7x	买	乱	乲	乳	乴	乵	乶	乷	乸	乹	乺	乻	乼	乽	乾	乿
U+4E8x	亀	亁	亂	亃	亄	亅	了	亇	予	争	亊	事	二	亍	于	亏
U+4E9x	亐	云	互	亓	五	井	亖	亗	亘	亙	亚	些	亜	亝	亞	亟
U+4EAx	亠	亡	亢	亣	交	亥	亦	产	亨	亩	亪	享	京	亭	亮	亯
U+4EBx	亰	亱	亲	亳	亴	亵	亶	亷	亸	亹	人	亻	亼	亽	亾	亿
U+4ECx	什	仁	仂	仃	仄	仅	仆	仇	仈	仉	今	介	仌	仍	从	仏
U+4EDx	仐	仑	仒	仓	仔	仕	他	仗	付	仙	仚	仛	仜	仝	仞	仟
U+4EEx	仠	仡	仢	代	令	以	仦	仧	仨	仩	仪	仫	们	仭	仮	仯
U+4EFx	仰	仱	仲	仳	仴	仵	件	价	仸	仹	仺	任	仼	份	仾	仿
U+4F0x	伀	企	伂	伃	伄	伅	伆	伇	伈	伉	伊	伋	伌	伍	伎	伏
U+4F1x	伐	休	伒	伓	伔	伕	伖	众	优	伙	会	伛	伜	伝	伞	伟
U+4F2x	传	伡	伢	伣	伤	伥	伦	伧	伨	伩	伪	伫	伬	伭	伮	伯
U+4F3x	估	伱	伲	伳	伴	伵	伶	伷	伸	伹	伺	伻	似	伽	伾	伿
U+4F4x	佀	佁	佂	佃	佄	佅	但	佇	佈	佉	佊	佋	佌	位	低	住
U+4F5x	佐	佑	佒	体	佔	何	佖	佗	佘	余	佚	佛	作	佝	佞	佟
U+4F6x	你	佡	佢	佣	佤	佥	佦	佧	佨	佩	佪	佫	佬	佭	佮	佯
U+4F7x	佰	佱	佲	佳	佴	併	佶	佷	佸	佹	佺	佻	佼	佽	佾	使
U+4F8x	侀	侁	侂	侃	侄	侅	來	侇	侈	侉	侊	例	侌	侍	侎	侏
U+4F9x	侐	侑	侒	侓	侔	侕	侖	侗	侘	侙	侚	供	侜	依	侞	侟
U+4FAx	侠	価	侢	侣	侤	侥	侦	侧	侨	侩	侪	侫	侬	侭	侮	侯
U+4FBx	侰	侱	侲	侳	侴	侵	侶	侷	侸	侹	侺	侻	侼	侽	侾	便
U+4FCx	俀	俁	係	促	俄	俅	俆	俇	俈	俉	俊	俋	俌	俍	俎	俏
U+4FDx	俐	俑	俒	俓	俔	俕	俖	俗	俘	俙	俚	俛	俜	保	俞	俟
U+4FEx	俠	信	俢	俣	俤	俥	俦	俧	俨	俩	俪	俫	俬	俭	修	俯
U+4FFx	俰	俱	俲	俳	俴	俵	俶	俷	俸	俹	俺	俻	俼	俽	俾	俿
U+500x	倀	倁	倂	倃	倄	倅	倆	倇	倈	倉	倊	個	倌	倍	倎	倏
U+501x	倐	們	倒	倓	倔	倕	倖	倗	倘	候	倚	倛	倜	倝	倞	借
U+502x	倠	倡	倢	倣	値	倥	倦	倧	倨	倩	倪	倫	倬	倭	倮	倯
U+503x	倰	倱	倲	倳	倴	倵	倶	倷	倸	倹	债	倻	值	倽	倾	倿
U+504x	偀	偁	偂	偃	偄	偅	偆	假	偈	偉	偊	偋	偌	偍	偎	偏
U+505x	偐	偑	偒	偓	偔	偕	偖	偗	偘	偙	做	偛	停	偝	偞	偟
U+506x	偠	偡	偢	偣	偤	健	偦	偧	偨	偩	偪	偫	偬	偭	偮	偯
U+507x	偰	偱	偲	偳	側	偵	偶	偷	偸	偹	偺	偻	偼	偽	偾	偿
U+508x	傀	傁	傂	傃	傄	傅	傆	傇	傈	傉	傊	傋	傌	傍	傎	傏
U+509x	傐	傑	傒	傓	傔	傕	傖	傗	傘	備	傚	傛	傜	傝	傞	傟
U+50Ax	傠	傡	傢	傣	傤	傥	傦	傧	储	傩	傪	傫	催	傭	傮	傯
U+50Bx	傰	傱	傲	傳	傴	債	傶	傷	傸	傹	傺	傻	傼	傽	傾	傿
U+50Cx	僀	僁	僂	僃	僄	僅	僆	僇	僈	僉	僊	僋	僌	働	僎	像
U+50Dx	僐	僑	僒	僓	僔	僕	僖	僗	僘	僙	僚	僛	僜	僝	僞	僟
U+50Ex	僠	僡	僢	僣	僤	僥	僦	僧	僨	僩	僪	僫	僬	僭	僮	僯
U+50Fx	僰	僱	僲	僳	僴	僵	僶	僷	僸	價	僺	僻	僼	僽	僾	僿
U+510x	儀	儁	儂	儃	億	儅	儆	儇	儈	儉	儊	儋	儌	儍	儎	儏
U+511x	儐	儑	儒	儓	儔	儕	儖	儗	儘	儙	儚	儛	儜	儝	儞	償
U+512x	儠	儡	儢	儣	儤	儥	儦	儧	儨	儩	優	儫	儬	儭	儮	儯
U+513x	儰	儱	儲	儳	儴	儵	儶	儷	儸	儹	儺	儻	儼	儽	儾	儿
U+514x	兀	允	兂	元	兄	充	兆	兇	先	光	兊	克	兌	免	兎	兏
U+515x	児	兑	兒	兓	兔	兕	兖	兗	兘	兙	党	兛	兜	兝	兞	兟
U+516x	兠	兡	兢	兣	兤	入	兦	內	全	兩	兪	八	公	六	兮	兯
U+517x	兰	共	兲	关	兴	兵	其	具	典	兹	兺	养	兼	兽	兾	兿
U+518x	冀	冁	冂	冃	冄	内	円	冇	冈	冉	冊	冋	册	再	冎	冏
U+519x	冐	冑	冒	冓	冔	冕	冖	冗	冘	写	冚	军	农	冝	冞	冟
U+51Ax	冠	冡	冢	冣	冤	冥	冦	冧	冨	冩	冪	冫	冬	冭	冮	冯
U+51Bx	冰	冱	冲	决	冴	况	冶	冷	冸	冹	冺	冻	冼	冽	冾	冿
U+51Cx	净	凁	凂	凃	凄	凅	准	凇	凈	凉	凊	凋	凌	凍	凎	减
U+51Dx	凐	凑	凒	凓	凔	凕	凖	凗	凘	凙	凚	凛	凜	凝	凞	凟
U+51Ex	几	凡	凢	凣	凤	凥	処	凧	凨	凩	凪	凫	凬	凭	凮	凯
U+51Fx	凰	凱	凲	凳	凴	凵	凶	凷	凸	凹	出	击	凼	函	凾	凿
U+520x	刀	刁	刂	刃	刄	刅	分	切	刈	刉	刊	刋	刌	刍	刎	刏
U+521x	刐	刑	划	刓	刔	刕	刖	列	刘	则	刚	创	刜	初	刞	刟
U+522x	删	刡	刢	刣	判	別	刦	刧	刨	利	刪	别	刬	刭	刮	刯
U+523x	到	刱	刲	刳	刴	刵	制	刷	券	刹	刺	刻	刼	刽	刾	刿
U+524x	剀	剁	剂	剃	剄	剅	剆	則	剈	剉	削	剋	剌	前	剎	剏
U+525x	剐	剑	剒	剓	剔	剕	剖	剗	剘	剙	剚	剛	剜	剝	剞	剟
U+526x	剠	剡	剢	剣	剤	剥	剦	剧	剨	剩	剪	剫	剬	剭	剮	副
U+527x	剰	剱	割	剳	剴	創	剶	剷	剸	剹	剺	剻	剼	剽	剾	剿
U+528x	劀	劁	劂	劃	劄	劅	劆	劇	劈	劉	劊	劋	劌	劍	劎	劏
U+529x	劐	劑	劒	劓	劔	劕	劖	劗	劘	劙	劚	力	劜	劝	办	功
U+52Ax	加	务	劢	劣	劤	劥	劦	劧	动	助	努	劫	劬	劭	劮	劯
U+52Bx	劰	励	劲	劳	労	劵	劶	劷	劸	効	劺	劻	劼	劽	劾	势
U+52Cx	勀	勁	勂	勃	勄	勅	勆	勇	勈	勉	勊	勋	勌	勍	勎	勏
U+52Dx	勐	勑	勒	勓	勔	動	勖	勗	勘	務	勚	勛	勜	勝	勞	募
U+52Ex	勠	勡	勢	勣	勤	勥	勦	勧	勨	勩	勪	勫	勬	勭	勮	勯
U+52Fx	勰	勱	勲	勳	勴	勵	勶	勷	勸	勹	勺	勻	勼	勽	勾	勿
U+530x	匀	匁	匂	匃	匄	包	匆	匇	匈	匉	匊	匋	匌	匍	匎	匏
U+531x	匐	匑	匒	匓	匔	匕	化	北	匘	匙	匚	匛	匜	匝	匞	匟
U+532x	匠	匡	匢	匣	匤	匥	匦	匧	匨	匩	匪	匫	匬	匭	匮	匯
U+533x	匰	匱	匲	匳	匴	匵	匶	匷	匸	匹	区	医	匼	匽	匾	匿
U+534x	區	十	卂	千	卄	卅	卆	升	午	卉	半	卋	卌	卍	华	协
U+535x	卐	卑	卒	卓	協	单	卖	南	単	卙	博	卛	卜	卝	卞	卟
U+536x	占	卡	卢	卣	卤	卥	卦	卧	卨	卩	卪	卫	卬	卭	卮	卯
U+537x	印	危	卲	即	却	卵	卶	卷	卸	卹	卺	卻	卼	卽	卾	卿
U+538x	厀	厁	厂	厃	厄	厅	历	厇	厈	厉	厊	压	厌	厍	厎	厏
U+539x	厐	厑	厒	厓	厔	厕	厖	厗	厘	厙	厚	厛	厜	厝	厞	原
U+53Ax	厠	厡	厢	厣	厤	厥	厦	厧	厨	厩	厪	厫	厬	厭	厮	厯
U+53Bx	厰	厱	厲	厳	厴	厵	厶	厷	厸	厹	厺	去	厼	厽	厾	县
U+53Cx	叀	叁	参	參	叄	叅	叆	叇	又	叉	及	友	双	反	収	叏
U+53Dx	叐	发	叒	叓	叔	叕	取	受	变	叙	叚	叛	叜	叝	叞	叟
U+53Ex	叠	叡	叢	口	古	句	另	叧	叨	叩	只	叫	召	叭	叮	可
U+53Fx	台	叱	史	右	叴	叵	叶	号	司	叹	叺	叻	叼	叽	叾	叿
U+540x	吀	吁	吂	吃	各	吅	吆	吇	合	吉	吊	吋	同	名	后	吏
U+541x	吐	向	吒	吓	吔	吕	吖	吗	吘	吙	吚	君	吜	吝	吞	吟
U+542x	吠	吡	吢	吣	吤	吥	否	吧	吨	吩	吪	含	听	吭	吮	启
U+543x	吰	吱	吲	吳	吴	吵	吶	吷	吸	吹	吺	吻	吼	吽	吾	吿
U+544x	呀	呁	呂	呃	呄	呅	呆	呇	呈	呉	告	呋	呌	呍	呎	呏
U+545x	呐	呑	呒	呓	呔	呕	呖	呗	员	呙	呚	呛	呜	呝	呞	呟
U+546x	呠	呡	呢	呣	呤	呥	呦	呧	周	呩	呪	呫	呬	呭	呮	呯
U+547x	呰	呱	呲	味	呴	呵	呶	呷	呸	呹	呺	呻	呼	命	呾	呿
U+548x	咀	咁	咂	咃	咄	咅	咆	咇	咈	咉	咊	咋	和	咍	咎	咏
U+549x	咐	咑	咒	咓	咔	咕	咖	咗	咘	咙	咚	咛	咜	咝	咞	咟
U+54Ax	咠	咡	咢	咣	咤	咥	咦	咧	咨	咩	咪	咫	咬	咭	咮	咯
U+54Bx	咰	咱	咲	咳	咴	咵	咶	咷	咸	咹	咺	咻	咼	咽	咾	咿
U+54Cx	哀	品	哂	哃	哄	哅	哆	哇	哈	哉	哊	哋	哌	响	哎	哏
U+54Dx	哐	哑	哒	哓	哔	哕	哖	哗	哘	哙	哚	哛	哜	哝	哞	哟
U+54Ex	哠	員	哢	哣	哤	哥	哦	哧	哨	哩	哪	哫	哬	哭	哮	哯
U+54Fx	哰	哱	哲	哳	哴	哵	哶	哷	哸	哹	哺	哻	哼	哽	哾	哿
U+550x	唀	唁	唂	唃	唄	唅	唆	唇	唈	唉	唊	唋	唌	唍	唎	唏
U+551x	唐	唑	唒	唓	唔	唕	唖	唗	唘	唙	唚	唛	唜	唝	唞	唟
U+552x	唠	唡	唢	唣	唤	唥	唦	唧	唨	唩	唪	唫	唬	唭	售	唯
U+553x	唰	唱	唲	唳	唴	唵	唶	唷	唸	唹	唺	唻	唼	唽	唾	唿
U+554x	啀	啁	啂	啃	啄	啅	商	啇	啈	啉	啊	啋	啌	啍	啎	問
U+555x	啐	啑	啒	啓	啔	啕	啖	啗	啘	啙	啚	啛	啜	啝	啞	啟
U+556x	啠	啡	啢	啣	啤	啥	啦	啧	啨	啩	啪	啫	啬	啭	啮	啯
U+557x	啰	啱	啲	啳	啴	啵	啶	啷	啸	啹	啺	啻	啼	啽	啾	啿
U+558x	喀	喁	喂	喃	善	喅	喆	喇	喈	喉	喊	喋	喌	喍	喎	喏
U+559x	喐	喑	喒	喓	喔	喕	喖	喗	喘	喙	喚	喛	喜	喝	喞	喟
U+55Ax	喠	喡	喢	喣	喤	喥	喦	喧	喨	喩	喪	喫	喬	喭	單	喯
U+55Bx	喰	喱	喲	喳	喴	喵	営	喷	喸	喹	喺	喻	喼	喽	喾	喿
U+55Cx	嗀	嗁	嗂	嗃	嗄	嗅	嗆	嗇	嗈	嗉	嗊	嗋	嗌	嗍	嗎	嗏
U+55Dx	嗐	嗑	嗒	嗓	嗔	嗕	嗖	嗗	嗘	嗙	嗚	嗛	嗜	嗝	嗞	嗟
U+55Ex	嗠	嗡	嗢	嗣	嗤	嗥	嗦	嗧	嗨	嗩	嗪	嗫	嗬	嗭	嗮	嗯
U+55Fx	嗰	嗱	嗲	嗳	嗴	嗵	嗶	嗷	嗸	嗹	嗺	嗻	嗼	嗽	嗾	嗿
U+560x	嘀	嘁	嘂	嘃	嘄	嘅	嘆	嘇	嘈	嘉	嘊	嘋	嘌	嘍	嘎	嘏
U+561x	嘐	嘑	嘒	嘓	嘔	嘕	嘖	嘗	嘘	嘙	嘚	嘛	嘜	嘝	嘞	嘟
U+562x	嘠	嘡	嘢	嘣	嘤	嘥	嘦	嘧	嘨	嘩	嘪	嘫	嘬	嘭	嘮	嘯
U+563x	嘰	嘱	嘲	嘳	嘴	嘵	嘶	嘷	嘸	嘹	嘺	嘻	嘼	嘽	嘾	嘿
U+564x	噀	噁	噂	噃	噄	噅	噆	噇	噈	噉	噊	噋	噌	噍	噎	噏
U+565x	噐	噑	噒	噓	噔	噕	噖	噗	噘	噙	噚	噛	噜	噝	噞	噟
U+566x	噠	噡	噢	噣	噤	噥	噦	噧	器	噩	噪	噫	噬	噭	噮	噯
U+567x	噰	噱	噲	噳	噴	噵	噶	噷	噸	噹	噺	噻	噼	噽	噾	噿
U+568x	嚀	嚁	嚂	嚃	嚄	嚅	嚆	嚇	嚈	嚉	嚊	嚋	嚌	嚍	嚎	嚏
U+569x	嚐	嚑	嚒	嚓	嚔	嚕	嚖	嚗	嚘	嚙	嚚	嚛	嚜	嚝	嚞	嚟
U+56Ax	嚠	嚡	嚢	嚣	嚤	嚥	嚦	嚧	嚨	嚩	嚪	嚫	嚬	嚭	嚮	嚯
U+56Bx	嚰	嚱	嚲	嚳	嚴	嚵	嚶	嚷	嚸	嚹	嚺	嚻	嚼	嚽	嚾	嚿
U+56Cx	囀	囁	囂	囃	囄	囅	囆	囇	囈	囉	囊	囋	囌	囍	囎	囏
U+56Dx	囐	囑	囒	囓	囔	囕	囖	囗	囘	囙	囚	四	囜	囝	回	囟
U+56Ex	因	囡	团	団	囤	囥	囦	囧	囨	囩	囪	囫	囬	园	囮	囯
U+56Fx	困	囱	囲	図	围	囵	囶	囷	囸	囹	固	囻	囼	国	图	囿
U+570x	圀	圁	圂	圃	圄	圅	圆	圇	圈	圉	圊	國	圌	圍	圎	圏
U+571x	圐	圑	園	圓	圔	圕	圖	圗	團	圙	圚	圛	圜	圝	圞	土
U+572x	圠	圡	圢	圣	圤	圥	圦	圧	在	圩	圪	圫	圬	圭	圮	圯
U+573x	地	圱	圲	圳	圴	圵	圶	圷	圸	圹	场	圻	圼	圽	圾	圿
U+574x	址	坁	坂	坃	坄	坅	坆	均	坈	坉	坊	坋	坌	坍	坎	坏
U+575x	坐	坑	坒	坓	坔	坕	坖	块	坘	坙	坚	坛	坜	坝	坞	坟
U+576x	坠	坡	坢	坣	坤	坥	坦	坧	坨	坩	坪	坫	坬	坭	坮	坯
U+577x	坰	坱	坲	坳	坴	坵	坶	坷	坸	坹	坺	坻	坼	坽	坾	坿
U+578x	垀	垁	垂	垃	垄	垅	垆	垇	垈	垉	垊	型	垌	垍	垎	垏
U+579x	垐	垑	垒	垓	垔	垕	垖	垗	垘	垙	垚	垛	垜	垝	垞	垟
U+57Ax	垠	垡	垢	垣	垤	垥	垦	垧	垨	垩	垪	垫	垬	垭	垮	垯
U+57Bx	垰	垱	垲	垳	垴	垵	垶	垷	垸	垹	垺	垻	垼	垽	垾	垿
U+57Cx	埀	埁	埂	埃	埄	埅	埆	埇	埈	埉	埊	埋	埌	埍	城	埏
U+57Dx	埐	埑	埒	埓	埔	埕	埖	埗	埘	埙	埚	埛	埜	埝	埞	域
U+57Ex	埠	埡	埢	埣	埤	埥	埦	埧	埨	埩	埪	埫	埬	埭	埮	埯
U+57Fx	埰	埱	埲	埳	埴	埵	埶	執	埸	培	基	埻	埼	埽	埾	埿
U+580x	堀	堁	堂	堃	堄	堅	堆	堇	堈	堉	堊	堋	堌	堍	堎	堏
U+581x	堐	堑	堒	堓	堔	堕	堖	堗	堘	堙	堚	堛	堜	堝	堞	堟
U+582x	堠	堡	堢	堣	堤	堥	堦	堧	堨	堩	堪	堫	堬	堭	堮	堯
U+583x	堰	報	堲	堳	場	堵	堶	堷	堸	堹	堺	堻	堼	堽	堾	堿
U+584x	塀	塁	塂	塃	塄	塅	塆	塇	塈	塉	塊	塋	塌	塍	塎	塏
U+585x	塐	塑	塒	塓	塔	塕	塖	塗	塘	塙	塚	塛	塜	塝	塞	塟
U+586x	塠	塡	塢	塣	塤	塥	塦	塧	塨	塩	塪	填	塬	塭	塮	塯
U+587x	塰	塱	塲	塳	塴	塵	塶	塷	塸	塹	塺	塻	塼	塽	塾	塿
U+588x	墀	墁	墂	境	墄	墅	墆	墇	墈	墉	墊	墋	墌	墍	墎	墏
U+589x	墐	墑	墒	墓	墔	墕	墖	増	墘	墙	墚	墛	墜	墝	增	墟
U+58Ax	墠	墡	墢	墣	墤	墥	墦	墧	墨	墩	墪	墫	墬	墭	墮	墯
U+58Bx	墰	墱	墲	墳	墴	墵	墶	墷	墸	墹	墺	墻	墼	墽	墾	墿
U+58Cx	壀	壁	壂	壃	壄	壅	壆	壇	壈	壉	壊	壋	壌	壍	壎	壏
U+58Dx	壐	壑	壒	壓	壔	壕	壖	壗	壘	壙	壚	壛	壜	壝	壞	壟
U+58Ex	壠	壡	壢	壣	壤	壥	壦	壧	壨	壩	壪	士	壬	壭	壮	壯
U+58Fx	声	壱	売	壳	壴	壵	壶	壷	壸	壹	壺	壻	壼	壽	壾	壿
U+590x	夀	夁	夂	夃	处	夅	夆	备	夈	変	夊	夋	夌	复	夎	夏
U+591x	夐	夑	夒	夓	夔	夕	外	夗	夘	夙	多	夛	夜	夝	夞	够
U+592x	夠	夡	夢	夣	夤	夥	夦	大	夨	天	太	夫	夬	夭	央	夯
U+593x	夰	失	夲	夳	头	夵	夶	夷	夸	夹	夺	夻	夼	夽	夾	夿
U+594x	奀	奁	奂	奃	奄	奅	奆	奇	奈	奉	奊	奋	奌	奍	奎	奏
U+595x	奐	契	奒	奓	奔	奕	奖	套	奘	奙	奚	奛	奜	奝	奞	奟
U+596x	奠	奡	奢	奣	奤	奥	奦	奧	奨	奩	奪	奫	奬	奭	奮	奯
U+597x	奰	奱	奲	女	奴	奵	奶	奷	奸	她	奺	奻	奼	好	奾	奿
U+598x	妀	妁	如	妃	妄	妅	妆	妇	妈	妉	妊	妋	妌	妍	妎	妏
U+599x	妐	妑	妒	妓	妔	妕	妖	妗	妘	妙	妚	妛	妜	妝	妞	妟
U+59Ax	妠	妡	妢	妣	妤	妥	妦	妧	妨	妩	妪	妫	妬	妭	妮	妯
U+59Bx	妰	妱	妲	妳	妴	妵	妶	妷	妸	妹	妺	妻	妼	妽	妾	妿
U+59Cx	姀	姁	姂	姃	姄	姅	姆	姇	姈	姉	姊	始	姌	姍	姎	姏
U+59Dx	姐	姑	姒	姓	委	姕	姖	姗	姘	姙	姚	姛	姜	姝	姞	姟
U+59Ex	姠	姡	姢	姣	姤	姥	姦	姧	姨	姩	姪	姫	姬	姭	姮	姯
U+59Fx	姰	姱	姲	姳	姴	姵	姶	姷	姸	姹	姺	姻	姼	姽	姾	姿
U+5A0x	娀	威	娂	娃	娄	娅	娆	娇	娈	娉	娊	娋	娌	娍	娎	娏
U+5A1x	娐	娑	娒	娓	娔	娕	娖	娗	娘	娙	娚	娛	娜	娝	娞	娟
U+5A2x	娠	娡	娢	娣	娤	娥	娦	娧	娨	娩	娪	娫	娬	娭	娮	娯
U+5A3x	娰	娱	娲	娳	娴	娵	娶	娷	娸	娹	娺	娻	娼	娽	娾	娿
U+5A4x	婀	婁	婂	婃	婄	婅	婆	婇	婈	婉	婊	婋	婌	婍	婎	婏
U+5A5x	婐	婑	婒	婓	婔	婕	婖	婗	婘	婙	婚	婛	婜	婝	婞	婟
U+5A6x	婠	婡	婢	婣	婤	婥	婦	婧	婨	婩	婪	婫	婬	婭	婮	婯
U+5A7x	婰	婱	婲	婳	婴	婵	婶	婷	婸	婹	婺	婻	婼	婽	婾	婿
U+5A8x	媀	媁	媂	媃	媄	媅	媆	媇	媈	媉	媊	媋	媌	媍	媎	媏
U+5A9x	媐	媑	媒	媓	媔	媕	媖	媗	媘	媙	媚	媛	媜	媝	媞	媟
U+5AAx	媠	媡	媢	媣	媤	媥	媦	媧	媨	媩	媪	媫	媬	媭	媮	媯
U+5ABx	媰	媱	媲	媳	媴	媵	媶	媷	媸	媹	媺	媻	媼	媽	媾	媿
U+5ACx	嫀	嫁	嫂	嫃	嫄	嫅	嫆	嫇	嫈	嫉	嫊	嫋	嫌	嫍	嫎	嫏
U+5ADx	嫐	嫑	嫒	嫓	嫔	嫕	嫖	嫗	嫘	嫙	嫚	嫛	嫜	嫝	嫞	嫟
U+5AEx	嫠	嫡	嫢	嫣	嫤	嫥	嫦	嫧	嫨	嫩	嫪	嫫	嫬	嫭	嫮	嫯
U+5AFx	嫰	嫱	嫲	嫳	嫴	嫵	嫶	嫷	嫸	嫹	嫺	嫻	嫼	嫽	嫾	嫿
U+5B0x	嬀	嬁	嬂	嬃	嬄	嬅	嬆	嬇	嬈	嬉	嬊	嬋	嬌	嬍	嬎	嬏
U+5B1x	嬐	嬑	嬒	嬓	嬔	嬕	嬖	嬗	嬘	嬙	嬚	嬛	嬜	嬝	嬞	嬟
U+5B2x	嬠	嬡	嬢	嬣	嬤	嬥	嬦	嬧	嬨	嬩	嬪	嬫	嬬	嬭	嬮	嬯
U+5B3x	嬰	嬱	嬲	嬳	嬴	嬵	嬶	嬷	嬸	嬹	嬺	嬻	嬼	嬽	嬾	嬿
U+5B4x	孀	孁	孂	孃	孄	孅	孆	孇	孈	孉	孊	孋	孌	孍	孎	孏
U+5B5x	子	孑	孒	孓	孔	孕	孖	字	存	孙	孚	孛	孜	孝	孞	孟
U+5B6x	孠	孡	孢	季	孤	孥	学	孧	孨	孩	孪	孫	孬	孭	孮	孯
U+5B7x	孰	孱	孲	孳	孴	孵	孶	孷	學	孹	孺	孻	孼	孽	孾	孿
U+5B8x	宀	宁	宂	它	宄	宅	宆	宇	守	安	宊	宋	完	宍	宎	宏
U+5B9x	宐	宑	宒	宓	宔	宕	宖	宗	官	宙	定	宛	宜	宝	实	実
U+5BAx	宠	审	客	宣	室	宥	宦	宧	宨	宩	宪	宫	宬	宭	宮	宯
U+5BBx	宰	宱	宲	害	宴	宵	家	宷	宸	容	宺	宻	宼	宽	宾	宿
U+5BCx	寀	寁	寂	寃	寄	寅	密	寇	寈	寉	寊	寋	富	寍	寎	寏
U+5BDx	寐	寑	寒	寓	寔	寕	寖	寗	寘	寙	寚	寛	寜	寝	寞	察
U+5BEx	寠	寡	寢	寣	寤	寥	實	寧	寨	審	寪	寫	寬	寭	寮	寯
U+5BFx	寰	寱	寲	寳	寴	寵	寶	寷	寸	对	寺	寻	导	寽	対	寿
U+5C0x	尀	封	専	尃	射	尅	将	將	專	尉	尊	尋	尌	對	導	小
U+5C1x	尐	少	尒	尓	尔	尕	尖	尗	尘	尙	尚	尛	尜	尝	尞	尟
U+5C2x	尠	尡	尢	尣	尤	尥	尦	尧	尨	尩	尪	尫	尬	尭	尮	尯
U+5C3x	尰	就	尲	尳	尴	尵	尶	尷	尸	尹	尺	尻	尼	尽	尾	尿
U+5C4x	局	屁	层	屃	屄	居	屆	屇	屈	屉	届	屋	屌	屍	屎	屏
U+5C5x	屐	屑	屒	屓	屔	展	屖	屗	屘	屙	屚	屛	屜	屝	属	屟
U+5C6x	屠	屡	屢	屣	層	履	屦	屧	屨	屩	屪	屫	屬	屭	屮	屯
U+5C7x	屰	山	屲	屳	屴	屵	屶	屷	屸	屹	屺	屻	屼	屽	屾	屿
U+5C8x	岀	岁	岂	岃	岄	岅	岆	岇	岈	岉	岊	岋	岌	岍	岎	岏
U+5C9x	岐	岑	岒	岓	岔	岕	岖	岗	岘	岙	岚	岛	岜	岝	岞	岟
U+5CAx	岠	岡	岢	岣	岤	岥	岦	岧	岨	岩	岪	岫	岬	岭	岮	岯
U+5CBx	岰	岱	岲	岳	岴	岵	岶	岷	岸	岹	岺	岻	岼	岽	岾	岿
U+5CCx	峀	峁	峂	峃	峄	峅	峆	峇	峈	峉	峊	峋	峌	峍	峎	峏
U+5CDx	峐	峑	峒	峓	峔	峕	峖	峗	峘	峙	峚	峛	峜	峝	峞	峟
U+5CEx	峠	峡	峢	峣	峤	峥	峦	峧	峨	峩	峪	峫	峬	峭	峮	峯
U+5CFx	峰	峱	峲	峳	峴	峵	島	峷	峸	峹	峺	峻	峼	峽	峾	峿
U+5D0x	崀	崁	崂	崃	崄	崅	崆	崇	崈	崉	崊	崋	崌	崍	崎	崏
U+5D1x	崐	崑	崒	崓	崔	崕	崖	崗	崘	崙	崚	崛	崜	崝	崞	崟
U+5D2x	崠	崡	崢	崣	崤	崥	崦	崧	崨	崩	崪	崫	崬	崭	崮	崯
U+5D3x	崰	崱	崲	崳	崴	崵	崶	崷	崸	崹	崺	崻	崼	崽	崾	崿
U+5D4x	嵀	嵁	嵂	嵃	嵄	嵅	嵆	嵇	嵈	嵉	嵊	嵋	嵌	嵍	嵎	嵏
U+5D5x	嵐	嵑	嵒	嵓	嵔	嵕	嵖	嵗	嵘	嵙	嵚	嵛	嵜	嵝	嵞	嵟
U+5D6x	嵠	嵡	嵢	嵣	嵤	嵥	嵦	嵧	嵨	嵩	嵪	嵫	嵬	嵭	嵮	嵯
U+5D7x	嵰	嵱	嵲	嵳	嵴	嵵	嵶	嵷	嵸	嵹	嵺	嵻	嵼	嵽	嵾	嵿
U+5D8x	嶀	嶁	嶂	嶃	嶄	嶅	嶆	嶇	嶈	嶉	嶊	嶋	嶌	嶍	嶎	嶏
U+5D9x	嶐	嶑	嶒	嶓	嶔	嶕	嶖	嶗	嶘	嶙	嶚	嶛	嶜	嶝	嶞	嶟
U+5DAx	嶠	嶡	嶢	嶣	嶤	嶥	嶦	嶧	嶨	嶩	嶪	嶫	嶬	嶭	嶮	嶯
U+5DBx	嶰	嶱	嶲	嶳	嶴	嶵	嶶	嶷	嶸	嶹	嶺	嶻	嶼	嶽	嶾	嶿
U+5DCx	巀	巁	巂	巃	巄	巅	巆	巇	巈	巉	巊	巋	巌	巍	巎	巏
U+5DDx	巐	巑	巒	巓	巔	巕	巖	巗	巘	巙	巚	巛	巜	川	州	巟
U+5DEx	巠	巡	巢	巣	巤	工	左	巧	巨	巩	巪	巫	巬	巭	差	巯
U+5DFx	巰	己	已	巳	巴	巵	巶	巷	巸	巹	巺	巻	巼	巽	巾	巿
U+5E0x	帀	币	市	布	帄	帅	帆	帇	师	帉	帊	帋	希	帍	帎	帏
U+5E1x	帐	帑	帒	帓	帔	帕	帖	帗	帘	帙	帚	帛	帜	帝	帞	帟
U+5E2x	帠	帡	帢	帣	帤	帥	带	帧	帨	帩	帪	師	帬	席	帮	帯
U+5E3x	帰	帱	帲	帳	帴	帵	帶	帷	常	帹	帺	帻	帼	帽	帾	帿
U+5E4x	幀	幁	幂	幃	幄	幅	幆	幇	幈	幉	幊	幋	幌	幍	幎	幏
U+5E5x	幐	幑	幒	幓	幔	幕	幖	幗	幘	幙	幚	幛	幜	幝	幞	幟
U+5E6x	幠	幡	幢	幣	幤	幥	幦	幧	幨	幩	幪	幫	幬	幭	幮	幯
U+5E7x	幰	幱	干	平	年	幵	并	幷	幸	幹	幺	幻	幼	幽	幾	广
U+5E8x	庀	庁	庂	広	庄	庅	庆	庇	庈	庉	床	庋	庌	庍	庎	序
U+5E9x	庐	庑	庒	库	应	底	庖	店	庘	庙	庚	庛	府	庝	庞	废
U+5EAx	庠	庡	庢	庣	庤	庥	度	座	庨	庩	庪	庫	庬	庭	庮	庯
U+5EBx	庰	庱	庲	庳	庴	庵	庶	康	庸	庹	庺	庻	庼	庽	庾	庿
U+5ECx	廀	廁	廂	廃	廄	廅	廆	廇	廈	廉	廊	廋	廌	廍	廎	廏
U+5EDx	廐	廑	廒	廓	廔	廕	廖	廗	廘	廙	廚	廛	廜	廝	廞	廟
U+5EEx	廠	廡	廢	廣	廤	廥	廦	廧	廨	廩	廪	廫	廬	廭	廮	廯
U+5EFx	廰	廱	廲	廳	廴	廵	延	廷	廸	廹	建	廻	廼	廽	廾	廿
U+5F0x	开	弁	异	弃	弄	弅	弆	弇	弈	弉	弊	弋	弌	弍	弎	式
U+5F1x	弐	弑	弒	弓	弔	引	弖	弗	弘	弙	弚	弛	弜	弝	弞	弟
U+5F2x	张	弡	弢	弣	弤	弥	弦	弧	弨	弩	弪	弫	弬	弭	弮	弯
U+5F3x	弰	弱	弲	弳	弴	張	弶	強	弸	弹	强	弻	弼	弽	弾	弿
U+5F4x	彀	彁	彂	彃	彄	彅	彆	彇	彈	彉	彊	彋	彌	彍	彎	彏
U+5F5x	彐	彑	归	当	彔	录	彖	彗	彘	彙	彚	彛	彜	彝	彞	彟
U+5F6x	彠	彡	形	彣	彤	彥	彦	彧	彨	彩	彪	彫	彬	彭	彮	彯
U+5F7x	彰	影	彲	彳	彴	彵	彶	彷	彸	役	彺	彻	彼	彽	彾	彿
U+5F8x	往	征	徂	徃	径	待	徆	徇	很	徉	徊	律	後	徍	徎	徏
U+5F9x	徐	徑	徒	従	徔	徕	徖	得	徘	徙	徚	徛	徜	徝	從	徟
U+5FAx	徠	御	徢	徣	徤	徥	徦	徧	徨	復	循	徫	徬	徭	微	徯
U+5FBx	徰	徱	徲	徳	徴	徵	徶	德	徸	徹	徺	徻	徼	徽	徾	徿
U+5FCx	忀	忁	忂	心	忄	必	忆	忇	忈	忉	忊	忋	忌	忍	忎	忏
U+5FDx	忐	忑	忒	忓	忔	忕	忖	志	忘	忙	忚	忛	応	忝	忞	忟
U+5FEx	忠	忡	忢	忣	忤	忥	忦	忧	忨	忩	忪	快	忬	忭	忮	忯
U+5FFx	忰	忱	忲	忳	忴	念	忶	忷	忸	忹	忺	忻	忼	忽	忾	忿
U+600x	怀	态	怂	怃	怄	怅	怆	怇	怈	怉	怊	怋	怌	怍	怎	怏
U+601x	怐	怑	怒	怓	怔	怕	怖	怗	怘	怙	怚	怛	怜	思	怞	怟
U+602x	怠	怡	怢	怣	怤	急	怦	性	怨	怩	怪	怫	怬	怭	怮	怯
U+603x	怰	怱	怲	怳	怴	怵	怶	怷	怸	怹	怺	总	怼	怽	怾	怿
U+604x	恀	恁	恂	恃	恄	恅	恆	恇	恈	恉	恊	恋	恌	恍	恎	恏
U+605x	恐	恑	恒	恓	恔	恕	恖	恗	恘	恙	恚	恛	恜	恝	恞	恟
U+606x	恠	恡	恢	恣	恤	恥	恦	恧	恨	恩	恪	恫	恬	恭	恮	息
U+607x	恰	恱	恲	恳	恴	恵	恶	恷	恸	恹	恺	恻	恼	恽	恾	恿
U+608x	悀	悁	悂	悃	悄	悅	悆	悇	悈	悉	悊	悋	悌	悍	悎	悏
U+609x	悐	悑	悒	悓	悔	悕	悖	悗	悘	悙	悚	悛	悜	悝	悞	悟
U+60Ax	悠	悡	悢	患	悤	悥	悦	悧	您	悩	悪	悫	悬	悭	悮	悯
U+60Bx	悰	悱	悲	悳	悴	悵	悶	悷	悸	悹	悺	悻	悼	悽	悾	悿
U+60Cx	惀	惁	惂	惃	惄	情	惆	惇	惈	惉	惊	惋	惌	惍	惎	惏
U+60Dx	惐	惑	惒	惓	惔	惕	惖	惗	惘	惙	惚	惛	惜	惝	惞	惟
U+60Ex	惠	惡	惢	惣	惤	惥	惦	惧	惨	惩	惪	惫	惬	惭	惮	惯
U+60Fx	惰	惱	惲	想	惴	惵	惶	惷	惸	惹	惺	惻	惼	惽	惾	惿
U+610x	愀	愁	愂	愃	愄	愅	愆	愇	愈	愉	愊	愋	愌	愍	愎	意
U+611x	愐	愑	愒	愓	愔	愕	愖	愗	愘	愙	愚	愛	愜	愝	愞	感
U+612x	愠	愡	愢	愣	愤	愥	愦	愧	愨	愩	愪	愫	愬	愭	愮	愯
U+613x	愰	愱	愲	愳	愴	愵	愶	愷	愸	愹	愺	愻	愼	愽	愾	愿
U+614x	慀	慁	慂	慃	慄	慅	慆	慇	慈	慉	慊	態	慌	慍	慎	慏
U+615x	慐	慑	慒	慓	慔	慕	慖	慗	慘	慙	慚	慛	慜	慝	慞	慟
U+616x	慠	慡	慢	慣	慤	慥	慦	慧	慨	慩	慪	慫	慬	慭	慮	慯
U+617x	慰	慱	慲	慳	慴	慵	慶	慷	慸	慹	慺	慻	慼	慽	慾	慿
U+618x	憀	憁	憂	憃	憄	憅	憆	憇	憈	憉	憊	憋	憌	憍	憎	憏
U+619x	憐	憑	憒	憓	憔	憕	憖	憗	憘	憙	憚	憛	憜	憝	憞	憟
U+61Ax	憠	憡	憢	憣	憤	憥	憦	憧	憨	憩	憪	憫	憬	憭	憮	憯
U+61Bx	憰	憱	憲	憳	憴	憵	憶	憷	憸	憹	憺	憻	憼	憽	憾	憿
U+61Cx	懀	懁	懂	懃	懄	懅	懆	懇	懈	應	懊	懋	懌	懍	懎	懏
U+61Dx	懐	懑	懒	懓	懔	懕	懖	懗	懘	懙	懚	懛	懜	懝	懞	懟
U+61Ex	懠	懡	懢	懣	懤	懥	懦	懧	懨	懩	懪	懫	懬	懭	懮	懯
U+61Fx	懰	懱	懲	懳	懴	懵	懶	懷	懸	懹	懺	懻	懼	懽	懾	懿
U+620x	戀	戁	戂	戃	戄	戅	戆	戇	戈	戉	戊	戋	戌	戍	戎	戏
U+621x	成	我	戒	戓	戔	戕	或	戗	战	戙	戚	戛	戜	戝	戞	戟
U+622x	戠	戡	戢	戣	戤	戥	戦	戧	戨	戩	截	戫	戬	戭	戮	戯
U+623x	戰	戱	戲	戳	戴	戵	戶	户	戸	戹	戺	戻	戼	戽	戾	房
U+624x	所	扁	扂	扃	扄	扅	扆	扇	扈	扉	扊	手	扌	才	扎	扏
U+625x	扐	扑	扒	打	扔	払	扖	扗	托	扙	扚	扛	扜	扝	扞	扟
U+626x	扠	扡	扢	扣	扤	扥	扦	执	扨	扩	扪	扫	扬	扭	扮	扯
U+627x	扰	扱	扲	扳	扴	扵	扶	扷	扸	批	扺	扻	扼	扽	找	承
U+628x	技	抁	抂	抃	抄	抅	抆	抇	抈	抉	把	抋	抌	抍	抎	抏
U+629x	抐	抑	抒	抓	抔	投	抖	抗	折	抙	抚	抛	抜	抝	択	抟
U+62Ax	抠	抡	抢	抣	护	报	抦	抧	抨	抩	抪	披	抬	抭	抮	抯
U+62Bx	抰	抱	抲	抳	抴	抵	抶	抷	抸	抹	抺	抻	押	抽	抾	抿
U+62Cx	拀	拁	拂	拃	拄	担	拆	拇	拈	拉	拊	拋	拌	拍	拎	拏
U+62Dx	拐	拑	拒	拓	拔	拕	拖	拗	拘	拙	拚	招	拜	拝	拞	拟
U+62Ex	拠	拡	拢	拣	拤	拥	拦	拧	拨	择	拪	拫	括	拭	拮	拯
U+62Fx	拰	拱	拲	拳	拴	拵	拶	拷	拸	拹	拺	拻	拼	拽	拾	拿
U+630x	挀	持	挂	挃	挄	挅	挆	指	挈	按	挊	挋	挌	挍	挎	挏
U+631x	挐	挑	挒	挓	挔	挕	挖	挗	挘	挙	挚	挛	挜	挝	挞	挟
U+632x	挠	挡	挢	挣	挤	挥	挦	挧	挨	挩	挪	挫	挬	挭	挮	振
U+633x	挰	挱	挲	挳	挴	挵	挶	挷	挸	挹	挺	挻	挼	挽	挾	挿
U+634x	捀	捁	捂	捃	捄	捅	捆	捇	捈	捉	捊	捋	捌	捍	捎	捏
U+635x	捐	捑	捒	捓	捔	捕	捖	捗	捘	捙	捚	捛	捜	捝	捞	损
U+636x	捠	捡	换	捣	捤	捥	捦	捧	捨	捩	捪	捫	捬	捭	据	捯
U+637x	捰	捱	捲	捳	捴	捵	捶	捷	捸	捹	捺	捻	捼	捽	捾	捿
U+638x	掀	掁	掂	掃	掄	掅	掆	掇	授	掉	掊	掋	掌	掍	掎	掏
U+639x	掐	掑	排	掓	掔	掕	掖	掗	掘	掙	掚	掛	掜	掝	掞	掟
U+63Ax	掠	採	探	掣	掤	接	掦	控	推	掩	措	掫	掬	掭	掮	掯
U+63Bx	掰	掱	掲	掳	掴	掵	掶	掷	掸	掹	掺	掻	掼	掽	掾	掿
U+63Cx	揀	揁	揂	揃	揄	揅	揆	揇	揈	揉	揊	揋	揌	揍	揎	描
U+63Dx	提	揑	插	揓	揔	揕	揖	揗	揘	揙	揚	換	揜	揝	揞	揟
U+63Ex	揠	握	揢	揣	揤	揥	揦	揧	揨	揩	揪	揫	揬	揭	揮	揯
U+63Fx	揰	揱	揲	揳	援	揵	揶	揷	揸	揹	揺	揻	揼	揽	揾	揿
U+640x	搀	搁	搂	搃	搄	搅	搆	搇	搈	搉	搊	搋	搌	損	搎	搏
U+641x	搐	搑	搒	搓	搔	搕	搖	搗	搘	搙	搚	搛	搜	搝	搞	搟
U+642x	搠	搡	搢	搣	搤	搥	搦	搧	搨	搩	搪	搫	搬	搭	搮	搯
U+643x	搰	搱	搲	搳	搴	搵	搶	搷	搸	搹	携	搻	搼	搽	搾	搿
U+644x	摀	摁	摂	摃	摄	摅	摆	摇	摈	摉	摊	摋	摌	摍	摎	摏
U+645x	摐	摑	摒	摓	摔	摕	摖	摗	摘	摙	摚	摛	摜	摝	摞	摟
U+646x	摠	摡	摢	摣	摤	摥	摦	摧	摨	摩	摪	摫	摬	摭	摮	摯
U+647x	摰	摱	摲	摳	摴	摵	摶	摷	摸	摹	摺	摻	摼	摽	摾	摿
U+648x	撀	撁	撂	撃	撄	撅	撆	撇	撈	撉	撊	撋	撌	撍	撎	撏
U+649x	撐	撑	撒	撓	撔	撕	撖	撗	撘	撙	撚	撛	撜	撝	撞	撟
U+64Ax	撠	撡	撢	撣	撤	撥	撦	撧	撨	撩	撪	撫	撬	播	撮	撯
U+64Bx	撰	撱	撲	撳	撴	撵	撶	撷	撸	撹	撺	撻	撼	撽	撾	撿
U+64Cx	擀	擁	擂	擃	擄	擅	擆	擇	擈	擉	擊	擋	擌	操	擎	擏
U+64Dx	擐	擑	擒	擓	擔	擕	擖	擗	擘	擙	據	擛	擜	擝	擞	擟
U+64Ex	擠	擡	擢	擣	擤	擥	擦	擧	擨	擩	擪	擫	擬	擭	擮	擯
U+64Fx	擰	擱	擲	擳	擴	擵	擶	擷	擸	擹	擺	擻	擼	擽	擾	擿
U+650x	攀	攁	攂	攃	攄	攅	攆	攇	攈	攉	攊	攋	攌	攍	攎	攏
U+651x	攐	攑	攒	攓	攔	攕	攖	攗	攘	攙	攚	攛	攜	攝	攞	攟
U+652x	攠	攡	攢	攣	攤	攥	攦	攧	攨	攩	攪	攫	攬	攭	攮	支
U+653x	攰	攱	攲	攳	攴	攵	收	攷	攸	改	攺	攻	攼	攽	放	政
U+654x	敀	敁	敂	敃	敄	故	敆	敇	效	敉	敊	敋	敌	敍	敎	敏
U+655x	敐	救	敒	敓	敔	敕	敖	敗	敘	教	敚	敛	敜	敝	敞	敟
U+656x	敠	敡	敢	散	敤	敥	敦	敧	敨	敩	敪	敫	敬	敭	敮	敯
U+657x	数	敱	敲	敳	整	敵	敶	敷	數	敹	敺	敻	敼	敽	敾	敿
U+658x	斀	斁	斂	斃	斄	斅	斆	文	斈	斉	斊	斋	斌	斍	斎	斏
U+659x	斐	斑	斒	斓	斔	斕	斖	斗	斘	料	斚	斛	斜	斝	斞	斟
U+65Ax	斠	斡	斢	斣	斤	斥	斦	斧	斨	斩	斪	斫	斬	断	斮	斯
U+65Bx	新	斱	斲	斳	斴	斵	斶	斷	斸	方	斺	斻	於	施	斾	斿
U+65Cx	旀	旁	旂	旃	旄	旅	旆	旇	旈	旉	旊	旋	旌	旍	旎	族
U+65Dx	旐	旑	旒	旓	旔	旕	旖	旗	旘	旙	旚	旛	旜	旝	旞	旟
U+65Ex	无	旡	既	旣	旤	日	旦	旧	旨	早	旪	旫	旬	旭	旮	旯
U+65Fx	旰	旱	旲	旳	旴	旵	时	旷	旸	旹	旺	旻	旼	旽	旾	旿
U+660x	昀	昁	昂	昃	昄	昅	昆	昇	昈	昉	昊	昋	昌	昍	明	昏
U+661x	昐	昑	昒	易	昔	昕	昖	昗	昘	昙	昚	昛	昜	昝	昞	星
U+662x	映	昡	昢	昣	昤	春	昦	昧	昨	昩	昪	昫	昬	昭	昮	是
U+663x	昰	昱	昲	昳	昴	昵	昶	昷	昸	昹	昺	昻	昼	昽	显	昿
U+664x	晀	晁	時	晃	晄	晅	晆	晇	晈	晉	晊	晋	晌	晍	晎	晏
U+665x	晐	晑	晒	晓	晔	晕	晖	晗	晘	晙	晚	晛	晜	晝	晞	晟
U+666x	晠	晡	晢	晣	晤	晥	晦	晧	晨	晩	晪	晫	晬	晭	普	景
U+667x	晰	晱	晲	晳	晴	晵	晶	晷	晸	晹	智	晻	晼	晽	晾	晿
U+668x	暀	暁	暂	暃	暄	暅	暆	暇	暈	暉	暊	暋	暌	暍	暎	暏
U+669x	暐	暑	暒	暓	暔	暕	暖	暗	暘	暙	暚	暛	暜	暝	暞	暟
U+66Ax	暠	暡	暢	暣	暤	暥	暦	暧	暨	暩	暪	暫	暬	暭	暮	暯
U+66Bx	暰	暱	暲	暳	暴	暵	暶	暷	暸	暹	暺	暻	暼	暽	暾	暿
U+66Cx	曀	曁	曂	曃	曄	曅	曆	曇	曈	曉	曊	曋	曌	曍	曎	曏
U+66Dx	曐	曑	曒	曓	曔	曕	曖	曗	曘	曙	曚	曛	曜	曝	曞	曟
U+66Ex	曠	曡	曢	曣	曤	曥	曦	曧	曨	曩	曪	曫	曬	曭	曮	曯
U+66Fx	曰	曱	曲	曳	更	曵	曶	曷	書	曹	曺	曻	曼	曽	曾	替
U+670x	最	朁	朂	會	朄	朅	朆	朇	月	有	朊	朋	朌	服	朎	朏
U+671x	朐	朑	朒	朓	朔	朕	朖	朗	朘	朙	朚	望	朜	朝	朞	期
U+672x	朠	朡	朢	朣	朤	朥	朦	朧	木	朩	未	末	本	札	朮	术
U+673x	朰	朱	朲	朳	朴	朵	朶	朷	朸	朹	机	朻	朼	朽	朾	朿
U+674x	杀	杁	杂	权	杄	杅	杆	杇	杈	杉	杊	杋	杌	杍	李	杏
U+675x	材	村	杒	杓	杔	杕	杖	杗	杘	杙	杚	杛	杜	杝	杞	束
U+676x	杠	条	杢	杣	杤	来	杦	杧	杨	杩	杪	杫	杬	杭	杮	杯
U+677x	杰	東	杲	杳	杴	杵	杶	杷	杸	杹	杺	杻	杼	杽	松	板
U+678x	枀	极	枂	枃	构	枅	枆	枇	枈	枉	枊	枋	枌	枍	枎	枏
U+679x	析	枑	枒	枓	枔	枕	枖	林	枘	枙	枚	枛	果	枝	枞	枟
U+67Ax	枠	枡	枢	枣	枤	枥	枦	枧	枨	枩	枪	枫	枬	枭	枮	枯
U+67Bx	枰	枱	枲	枳	枴	枵	架	枷	枸	枹	枺	枻	枼	枽	枾	枿
U+67Cx	柀	柁	柂	柃	柄	柅	柆	柇	柈	柉	柊	柋	柌	柍	柎	柏
U+67Dx	某	柑	柒	染	柔	柕	柖	柗	柘	柙	柚	柛	柜	柝	柞	柟
U+67Ex	柠	柡	柢	柣	柤	查	柦	柧	柨	柩	柪	柫	柬	柭	柮	柯
U+67Fx	柰	柱	柲	柳	柴	柵	柶	柷	柸	柹	柺	査	柼	柽	柾	柿
U+680x	栀	栁	栂	栃	栄	栅	栆	标	栈	栉	栊	栋	栌	栍	栎	栏
U+681x	栐	树	栒	栓	栔	栕	栖	栗	栘	栙	栚	栛	栜	栝	栞	栟
U+682x	栠	校	栢	栣	栤	栥	栦	栧	栨	栩	株	栫	栬	栭	栮	栯
U+683x	栰	栱	栲	栳	栴	栵	栶	样	核	根	栺	栻	格	栽	栾	栿
U+684x	桀	桁	桂	桃	桄	桅	框	桇	案	桉	桊	桋	桌	桍	桎	桏
U+685x	桐	桑	桒	桓	桔	桕	桖	桗	桘	桙	桚	桛	桜	桝	桞	桟
U+686x	桠	桡	桢	档	桤	桥	桦	桧	桨	桩	桪	桫	桬	桭	桮	桯
U+687x	桰	桱	桲	桳	桴	桵	桶	桷	桸	桹	桺	桻	桼	桽	桾	桿
U+688x	梀	梁	梂	梃	梄	梅	梆	梇	梈	梉	梊	梋	梌	梍	梎	梏
U+689x	梐	梑	梒	梓	梔	梕	梖	梗	梘	梙	梚	梛	梜	條	梞	梟
U+68Ax	梠	梡	梢	梣	梤	梥	梦	梧	梨	梩	梪	梫	梬	梭	梮	梯
U+68Bx	械	梱	梲	梳	梴	梵	梶	梷	梸	梹	梺	梻	梼	梽	梾	梿
U+68Cx	检	棁	棂	棃	棄	棅	棆	棇	棈	棉	棊	棋	棌	棍	棎	棏
U+68Dx	棐	棑	棒	棓	棔	棕	棖	棗	棘	棙	棚	棛	棜	棝	棞	棟
U+68Ex	棠	棡	棢	棣	棤	棥	棦	棧	棨	棩	棪	棫	棬	棭	森	棯
U+68Fx	棰	棱	棲	棳	棴	棵	棶	棷	棸	棹	棺	棻	棼	棽	棾	棿
U+690x	椀	椁	椂	椃	椄	椅	椆	椇	椈	椉	椊	椋	椌	植	椎	椏
U+691x	椐	椑	椒	椓	椔	椕	椖	椗	椘	椙	椚	椛	検	椝	椞	椟
U+692x	椠	椡	椢	椣	椤	椥	椦	椧	椨	椩	椪	椫	椬	椭	椮	椯
U+693x	椰	椱	椲	椳	椴	椵	椶	椷	椸	椹	椺	椻	椼	椽	椾	椿
U+694x	楀	楁	楂	楃	楄	楅	楆	楇	楈	楉	楊	楋	楌	楍	楎	楏
U+695x	楐	楑	楒	楓	楔	楕	楖	楗	楘	楙	楚	楛	楜	楝	楞	楟
U+696x	楠	楡	楢	楣	楤	楥	楦	楧	楨	楩	楪	楫	楬	業	楮	楯
U+697x	楰	楱	楲	楳	楴	極	楶	楷	楸	楹	楺	楻	楼	楽	楾	楿
U+698x	榀	榁	概	榃	榄	榅	榆	榇	榈	榉	榊	榋	榌	榍	榎	榏
U+699x	榐	榑	榒	榓	榔	榕	榖	榗	榘	榙	榚	榛	榜	榝	榞	榟
U+69Ax	榠	榡	榢	榣	榤	榥	榦	榧	榨	榩	榪	榫	榬	榭	榮	榯
U+69Bx	榰	榱	榲	榳	榴	榵	榶	榷	榸	榹	榺	榻	榼	榽	榾	榿
U+69Cx	槀	槁	槂	槃	槄	槅	槆	槇	槈	槉	槊	構	槌	槍	槎	槏
U+69Dx	槐	槑	槒	槓	槔	槕	槖	槗	様	槙	槚	槛	槜	槝	槞	槟
U+69Ex	槠	槡	槢	槣	槤	槥	槦	槧	槨	槩	槪	槫	槬	槭	槮	槯
U+69Fx	槰	槱	槲	槳	槴	槵	槶	槷	槸	槹	槺	槻	槼	槽	槾	槿
U+6A0x	樀	樁	樂	樃	樄	樅	樆	樇	樈	樉	樊	樋	樌	樍	樎	樏
U+6A1x	樐	樑	樒	樓	樔	樕	樖	樗	樘	標	樚	樛	樜	樝	樞	樟
U+6A2x	樠	模	樢	樣	樤	樥	樦	樧	樨	権	横	樫	樬	樭	樮	樯
U+6A3x	樰	樱	樲	樳	樴	樵	樶	樷	樸	樹	樺	樻	樼	樽	樾	樿
U+6A4x	橀	橁	橂	橃	橄	橅	橆	橇	橈	橉	橊	橋	橌	橍	橎	橏
U+6A5x	橐	橑	橒	橓	橔	橕	橖	橗	橘	橙	橚	橛	橜	橝	橞	機
U+6A6x	橠	橡	橢	橣	橤	橥	橦	橧	橨	橩	橪	橫	橬	橭	橮	橯
U+6A7x	橰	橱	橲	橳	橴	橵	橶	橷	橸	橹	橺	橻	橼	橽	橾	橿
U+6A8x	檀	檁	檂	檃	檄	檅	檆	檇	檈	檉	檊	檋	檌	檍	檎	檏
U+6A9x	檐	檑	檒	檓	檔	檕	檖	檗	檘	檙	檚	檛	檜	檝	檞	檟
U+6AAx	檠	檡	檢	檣	檤	檥	檦	檧	檨	檩	檪	檫	檬	檭	檮	檯
U+6ABx	檰	檱	檲	檳	檴	檵	檶	檷	檸	檹	檺	檻	檼	檽	檾	檿
U+6ACx	櫀	櫁	櫂	櫃	櫄	櫅	櫆	櫇	櫈	櫉	櫊	櫋	櫌	櫍	櫎	櫏
U+6ADx	櫐	櫑	櫒	櫓	櫔	櫕	櫖	櫗	櫘	櫙	櫚	櫛	櫜	櫝	櫞	櫟
U+6AEx	櫠	櫡	櫢	櫣	櫤	櫥	櫦	櫧	櫨	櫩	櫪	櫫	櫬	櫭	櫮	櫯
U+6AFx	櫰	櫱	櫲	櫳	櫴	櫵	櫶	櫷	櫸	櫹	櫺	櫻	櫼	櫽	櫾	櫿
U+6B0x	欀	欁	欂	欃	欄	欅	欆	欇	欈	欉	權	欋	欌	欍	欎	欏
U+6B1x	欐	欑	欒	欓	欔	欕	欖	欗	欘	欙	欚	欛	欜	欝	欞	欟
U+6B2x	欠	次	欢	欣	欤	欥	欦	欧	欨	欩	欪	欫	欬	欭	欮	欯
U+6B3x	欰	欱	欲	欳	欴	欵	欶	欷	欸	欹	欺	欻	欼	欽	款	欿
U+6B4x	歀	歁	歂	歃	歄	歅	歆	歇	歈	歉	歊	歋	歌	歍	歎	歏
U+6B5x	歐	歑	歒	歓	歔	歕	歖	歗	歘	歙	歚	歛	歜	歝	歞	歟
U+6B6x	歠	歡	止	正	此	步	武	歧	歨	歩	歪	歫	歬	歭	歮	歯
U+6B7x	歰	歱	歲	歳	歴	歵	歶	歷	歸	歹	歺	死	歼	歽	歾	歿
U+6B8x	殀	殁	殂	殃	殄	殅	殆	殇	殈	殉	殊	残	殌	殍	殎	殏
U+6B9x	殐	殑	殒	殓	殔	殕	殖	殗	殘	殙	殚	殛	殜	殝	殞	殟
U+6BAx	殠	殡	殢	殣	殤	殥	殦	殧	殨	殩	殪	殫	殬	殭	殮	殯
U+6BBx	殰	殱	殲	殳	殴	段	殶	殷	殸	殹	殺	殻	殼	殽	殾	殿
U+6BCx	毀	毁	毂	毃	毄	毅	毆	毇	毈	毉	毊	毋	毌	母	毎	每
U+6BDx	毐	毑	毒	毓	比	毕	毖	毗	毘	毙	毚	毛	毜	毝	毞	毟
U+6BEx	毠	毡	毢	毣	毤	毥	毦	毧	毨	毩	毪	毫	毬	毭	毮	毯
U+6BFx	毰	毱	毲	毳	毴	毵	毶	毷	毸	毹	毺	毻	毼	毽	毾	毿
U+6C0x	氀	氁	氂	氃	氄	氅	氆	氇	氈	氉	氊	氋	氌	氍	氎	氏
U+6C1x	氐	民	氒	氓	气	氕	氖	気	氘	氙	氚	氛	氜	氝	氞	氟
U+6C2x	氠	氡	氢	氣	氤	氥	氦	氧	氨	氩	氪	氫	氬	氭	氮	氯
U+6C3x	氰	氱	氲	氳	水	氵	氶	氷	永	氹	氺	氻	氼	氽	氾	氿
U+6C4x	汀	汁	求	汃	汄	汅	汆	汇	汈	汉	汊	汋	汌	汍	汎	汏
U+6C5x	汐	汑	汒	汓	汔	汕	汖	汗	汘	汙	汚	汛	汜	汝	汞	江
U+6C6x	池	污	汢	汣	汤	汥	汦	汧	汨	汩	汪	汫	汬	汭	汮	汯
U+6C7x	汰	汱	汲	汳	汴	汵	汶	汷	汸	汹	決	汻	汼	汽	汾	汿
U+6C8x	沀	沁	沂	沃	沄	沅	沆	沇	沈	沉	沊	沋	沌	沍	沎	沏
U+6C9x	沐	沑	沒	沓	沔	沕	沖	沗	沘	沙	沚	沛	沜	沝	沞	沟
U+6CAx	沠	没	沢	沣	沤	沥	沦	沧	沨	沩	沪	沫	沬	沭	沮	沯
U+6CBx	沰	沱	沲	河	沴	沵	沶	沷	沸	油	沺	治	沼	沽	沾	沿
U+6CCx	泀	況	泂	泃	泄	泅	泆	泇	泈	泉	泊	泋	泌	泍	泎	泏
U+6CDx	泐	泑	泒	泓	泔	法	泖	泗	泘	泙	泚	泛	泜	泝	泞	泟
U+6CEx	泠	泡	波	泣	泤	泥	泦	泧	注	泩	泪	泫	泬	泭	泮	泯
U+6CFx	泰	泱	泲	泳	泴	泵	泶	泷	泸	泹	泺	泻	泼	泽	泾	泿
U+6D0x	洀	洁	洂	洃	洄	洅	洆	洇	洈	洉	洊	洋	洌	洍	洎	洏
U+6D1x	洐	洑	洒	洓	洔	洕	洖	洗	洘	洙	洚	洛	洜	洝	洞	洟
U+6D2x	洠	洡	洢	洣	洤	津	洦	洧	洨	洩	洪	洫	洬	洭	洮	洯
U+6D3x	洰	洱	洲	洳	洴	洵	洶	洷	洸	洹	洺	活	洼	洽	派	洿
U+6D4x	浀	流	浂	浃	浄	浅	浆	浇	浈	浉	浊	测	浌	浍	济	浏
U+6D5x	浐	浑	浒	浓	浔	浕	浖	浗	浘	浙	浚	浛	浜	浝	浞	浟
U+6D6x	浠	浡	浢	浣	浤	浥	浦	浧	浨	浩	浪	浫	浬	浭	浮	浯
U+6D7x	浰	浱	浲	浳	浴	浵	浶	海	浸	浹	浺	浻	浼	浽	浾	浿
U+6D8x	涀	涁	涂	涃	涄	涅	涆	涇	消	涉	涊	涋	涌	涍	涎	涏
U+6D9x	涐	涑	涒	涓	涔	涕	涖	涗	涘	涙	涚	涛	涜	涝	涞	涟
U+6DAx	涠	涡	涢	涣	涤	涥	润	涧	涨	涩	涪	涫	涬	涭	涮	涯
U+6DBx	涰	涱	液	涳	涴	涵	涶	涷	涸	涹	涺	涻	涼	涽	涾	涿
U+6DCx	淀	淁	淂	淃	淄	淅	淆	淇	淈	淉	淊	淋	淌	淍	淎	淏
U+6DDx	淐	淑	淒	淓	淔	淕	淖	淗	淘	淙	淚	淛	淜	淝	淞	淟
U+6DEx	淠	淡	淢	淣	淤	淥	淦	淧	淨	淩	淪	淫	淬	淭	淮	淯
U+6DFx	淰	深	淲	淳	淴	淵	淶	混	淸	淹	淺	添	淼	淽	淾	淿
U+6E0x	渀	渁	渂	渃	渄	清	渆	渇	済	渉	渊	渋	渌	渍	渎	渏
U+6E1x	渐	渑	渒	渓	渔	渕	渖	渗	渘	渙	渚	減	渜	渝	渞	渟
U+6E2x	渠	渡	渢	渣	渤	渥	渦	渧	渨	温	渪	渫	測	渭	渮	港
U+6E3x	渰	渱	渲	渳	渴	渵	渶	渷	游	渹	渺	渻	渼	渽	渾	渿
U+6E4x	湀	湁	湂	湃	湄	湅	湆	湇	湈	湉	湊	湋	湌	湍	湎	湏
U+6E5x	湐	湑	湒	湓	湔	湕	湖	湗	湘	湙	湚	湛	湜	湝	湞	湟
U+6E6x	湠	湡	湢	湣	湤	湥	湦	湧	湨	湩	湪	湫	湬	湭	湮	湯
U+6E7x	湰	湱	湲	湳	湴	湵	湶	湷	湸	湹	湺	湻	湼	湽	湾	湿
U+6E8x	満	溁	溂	溃	溄	溅	溆	溇	溈	溉	溊	溋	溌	溍	溎	溏
U+6E9x	源	溑	溒	溓	溔	溕	準	溗	溘	溙	溚	溛	溜	溝	溞	溟
U+6EAx	溠	溡	溢	溣	溤	溥	溦	溧	溨	溩	溪	溫	溬	溭	溮	溯
U+6EBx	溰	溱	溲	溳	溴	溵	溶	溷	溸	溹	溺	溻	溼	溽	溾	溿
U+6ECx	滀	滁	滂	滃	滄	滅	滆	滇	滈	滉	滊	滋	滌	滍	滎	滏
U+6EDx	滐	滑	滒	滓	滔	滕	滖	滗	滘	滙	滚	滛	滜	滝	滞	滟
U+6EEx	滠	满	滢	滣	滤	滥	滦	滧	滨	滩	滪	滫	滬	滭	滮	滯
U+6EFx	滰	滱	滲	滳	滴	滵	滶	滷	滸	滹	滺	滻	滼	滽	滾	滿
U+6F0x	漀	漁	漂	漃	漄	漅	漆	漇	漈	漉	漊	漋	漌	漍	漎	漏
U+6F1x	漐	漑	漒	漓	演	漕	漖	漗	漘	漙	漚	漛	漜	漝	漞	漟
U+6F2x	漠	漡	漢	漣	漤	漥	漦	漧	漨	漩	漪	漫	漬	漭	漮	漯
U+6F3x	漰	漱	漲	漳	漴	漵	漶	漷	漸	漹	漺	漻	漼	漽	漾	漿
U+6F4x	潀	潁	潂	潃	潄	潅	潆	潇	潈	潉	潊	潋	潌	潍	潎	潏
U+6F5x	潐	潑	潒	潓	潔	潕	潖	潗	潘	潙	潚	潛	潜	潝	潞	潟
U+6F6x	潠	潡	潢	潣	潤	潥	潦	潧	潨	潩	潪	潫	潬	潭	潮	潯
U+6F7x	潰	潱	潲	潳	潴	潵	潶	潷	潸	潹	潺	潻	潼	潽	潾	潿
U+6F8x	澀	澁	澂	澃	澄	澅	澆	澇	澈	澉	澊	澋	澌	澍	澎	澏
U+6F9x	澐	澑	澒	澓	澔	澕	澖	澗	澘	澙	澚	澛	澜	澝	澞	澟
U+6FAx	澠	澡	澢	澣	澤	澥	澦	澧	澨	澩	澪	澫	澬	澭	澮	澯
U+6FBx	澰	澱	澲	澳	澴	澵	澶	澷	澸	澹	澺	澻	澼	澽	澾	澿
U+6FCx	激	濁	濂	濃	濄	濅	濆	濇	濈	濉	濊	濋	濌	濍	濎	濏
U+6FDx	濐	濑	濒	濓	濔	濕	濖	濗	濘	濙	濚	濛	濜	濝	濞	濟
U+6FEx	濠	濡	濢	濣	濤	濥	濦	濧	濨	濩	濪	濫	濬	濭	濮	濯
U+6FFx	濰	濱	濲	濳	濴	濵	濶	濷	濸	濹	濺	濻	濼	濽	濾	濿
U+700x	瀀	瀁	瀂	瀃	瀄	瀅	瀆	瀇	瀈	瀉	瀊	瀋	瀌	瀍	瀎	瀏
U+701x	瀐	瀑	瀒	瀓	瀔	瀕	瀖	瀗	瀘	瀙	瀚	瀛	瀜	瀝	瀞	瀟
U+702x	瀠	瀡	瀢	瀣	瀤	瀥	瀦	瀧	瀨	瀩	瀪	瀫	瀬	瀭	瀮	瀯
U+703x	瀰	瀱	瀲	瀳	瀴	瀵	瀶	瀷	瀸	瀹	瀺	瀻	瀼	瀽	瀾	瀿
U+704x	灀	灁	灂	灃	灄	灅	灆	灇	灈	灉	灊	灋	灌	灍	灎	灏
U+705x	灐	灑	灒	灓	灔	灕	灖	灗	灘	灙	灚	灛	灜	灝	灞	灟
U+706x	灠	灡	灢	灣	灤	灥	灦	灧	灨	灩	灪	火	灬	灭	灮	灯
U+707x	灰	灱	灲	灳	灴	灵	灶	灷	灸	灹	灺	灻	灼	災	灾	灿
U+708x	炀	炁	炂	炃	炄	炅	炆	炇	炈	炉	炊	炋	炌	炍	炎	炏
U+709x	炐	炑	炒	炓	炔	炕	炖	炗	炘	炙	炚	炛	炜	炝	炞	炟
U+70Ax	炠	炡	炢	炣	炤	炥	炦	炧	炨	炩	炪	炫	炬	炭	炮	炯
U+70Bx	炰	炱	炲	炳	炴	炵	炶	炷	炸	点	為	炻	炼	炽	炾	炿
U+70Cx	烀	烁	烂	烃	烄	烅	烆	烇	烈	烉	烊	烋	烌	烍	烎	烏
U+70Dx	烐	烑	烒	烓	烔	烕	烖	烗	烘	烙	烚	烛	烜	烝	烞	烟
U+70Ex	烠	烡	烢	烣	烤	烥	烦	烧	烨	烩	烪	烫	烬	热	烮	烯
U+70Fx	烰	烱	烲	烳	烴	烵	烶	烷	烸	烹	烺	烻	烼	烽	烾	烿
U+710x	焀	焁	焂	焃	焄	焅	焆	焇	焈	焉	焊	焋	焌	焍	焎	焏
U+711x	焐	焑	焒	焓	焔	焕	焖	焗	焘	焙	焚	焛	焜	焝	焞	焟
U+712x	焠	無	焢	焣	焤	焥	焦	焧	焨	焩	焪	焫	焬	焭	焮	焯
U+713x	焰	焱	焲	焳	焴	焵	然	焷	焸	焹	焺	焻	焼	焽	焾	焿
U+714x	煀	煁	煂	煃	煄	煅	煆	煇	煈	煉	煊	煋	煌	煍	煎	煏
U+715x	煐	煑	煒	煓	煔	煕	煖	煗	煘	煙	煚	煛	煜	煝	煞	煟
U+716x	煠	煡	煢	煣	煤	煥	煦	照	煨	煩	煪	煫	煬	煭	煮	煯
U+717x	煰	煱	煲	煳	煴	煵	煶	煷	煸	煹	煺	煻	煼	煽	煾	煿
U+718x	熀	熁	熂	熃	熄	熅	熆	熇	熈	熉	熊	熋	熌	熍	熎	熏
U+719x	熐	熑	熒	熓	熔	熕	熖	熗	熘	熙	熚	熛	熜	熝	熞	熟
U+71Ax	熠	熡	熢	熣	熤	熥	熦	熧	熨	熩	熪	熫	熬	熭	熮	熯
U+71Bx	熰	熱	熲	熳	熴	熵	熶	熷	熸	熹	熺	熻	熼	熽	熾	熿
U+71Cx	燀	燁	燂	燃	燄	燅	燆	燇	燈	燉	燊	燋	燌	燍	燎	燏
U+71Dx	燐	燑	燒	燓	燔	燕	燖	燗	燘	燙	燚	燛	燜	燝	燞	營
U+71Ex	燠	燡	燢	燣	燤	燥	燦	燧	燨	燩	燪	燫	燬	燭	燮	燯
U+71Fx	燰	燱	燲	燳	燴	燵	燶	燷	燸	燹	燺	燻	燼	燽	燾	燿
U+720x	爀	爁	爂	爃	爄	爅	爆	爇	爈	爉	爊	爋	爌	爍	爎	爏
U+721x	爐	爑	爒	爓	爔	爕	爖	爗	爘	爙	爚	爛	爜	爝	爞	爟
U+722x	爠	爡	爢	爣	爤	爥	爦	爧	爨	爩	爪	爫	爬	爭	爮	爯
U+723x	爰	爱	爲	爳	爴	爵	父	爷	爸	爹	爺	爻	爼	爽	爾	爿
U+724x	牀	牁	牂	牃	牄	牅	牆	片	版	牉	牊	牋	牌	牍	牎	牏
U+725x	牐	牑	牒	牓	牔	牕	牖	牗	牘	牙	牚	牛	牜	牝	牞	牟
U+726x	牠	牡	牢	牣	牤	牥	牦	牧	牨	物	牪	牫	牬	牭	牮	牯
U+727x	牰	牱	牲	牳	牴	牵	牶	牷	牸	特	牺	牻	牼	牽	牾	牿
U+728x	犀	犁	犂	犃	犄	犅	犆	犇	犈	犉	犊	犋	犌	犍	犎	犏
U+729x	犐	犑	犒	犓	犔	犕	犖	犗	犘	犙	犚	犛	犜	犝	犞	犟
U+72Ax	犠	犡	犢	犣	犤	犥	犦	犧	犨	犩	犪	犫	犬	犭	犮	犯
U+72Bx	犰	犱	犲	犳	犴	犵	状	犷	犸	犹	犺	犻	犼	犽	犾	犿
U+72Cx	狀	狁	狂	狃	狄	狅	狆	狇	狈	狉	狊	狋	狌	狍	狎	狏
U+72Dx	狐	狑	狒	狓	狔	狕	狖	狗	狘	狙	狚	狛	狜	狝	狞	狟
U+72Ex	狠	狡	狢	狣	狤	狥	狦	狧	狨	狩	狪	狫	独	狭	狮	狯
U+72Fx	狰	狱	狲	狳	狴	狵	狶	狷	狸	狹	狺	狻	狼	狽	狾	狿
U+730x	猀	猁	猂	猃	猄	猅	猆	猇	猈	猉	猊	猋	猌	猍	猎	猏
U+731x	猐	猑	猒	猓	猔	猕	猖	猗	猘	猙	猚	猛	猜	猝	猞	猟
U+732x	猠	猡	猢	猣	猤	猥	猦	猧	猨	猩	猪	猫	猬	猭	献	猯
U+733x	猰	猱	猲	猳	猴	猵	猶	猷	猸	猹	猺	猻	猼	猽	猾	猿
U+734x	獀	獁	獂	獃	獄	獅	獆	獇	獈	獉	獊	獋	獌	獍	獎	獏
U+735x	獐	獑	獒	獓	獔	獕	獖	獗	獘	獙	獚	獛	獜	獝	獞	獟
U+736x	獠	獡	獢	獣	獤	獥	獦	獧	獨	獩	獪	獫	獬	獭	獮	獯
U+737x	獰	獱	獲	獳	獴	獵	獶	獷	獸	獹	獺	獻	獼	獽	獾	獿
U+738x	玀	玁	玂	玃	玄	玅	玆	率	玈	玉	玊	王	玌	玍	玎	玏
U+739x	玐	玑	玒	玓	玔	玕	玖	玗	玘	玙	玚	玛	玜	玝	玞	玟
U+73Ax	玠	玡	玢	玣	玤	玥	玦	玧	玨	玩	玪	玫	玬	玭	玮	环
U+73Bx	现	玱	玲	玳	玴	玵	玶	玷	玸	玹	玺	玻	玼	玽	玾	玿
U+73Cx	珀	珁	珂	珃	珄	珅	珆	珇	珈	珉	珊	珋	珌	珍	珎	珏
U+73Dx	珐	珑	珒	珓	珔	珕	珖	珗	珘	珙	珚	珛	珜	珝	珞	珟
U+73Ex	珠	珡	珢	珣	珤	珥	珦	珧	珨	珩	珪	珫	珬	班	珮	珯
U+73Fx	珰	珱	珲	珳	珴	珵	珶	珷	珸	珹	珺	珻	珼	珽	現	珿
U+740x	琀	琁	琂	球	琄	琅	理	琇	琈	琉	琊	琋	琌	琍	琎	琏
U+741x	琐	琑	琒	琓	琔	琕	琖	琗	琘	琙	琚	琛	琜	琝	琞	琟
U+742x	琠	琡	琢	琣	琤	琥	琦	琧	琨	琩	琪	琫	琬	琭	琮	琯
U+743x	琰	琱	琲	琳	琴	琵	琶	琷	琸	琹	琺	琻	琼	琽	琾	琿
U+744x	瑀	瑁	瑂	瑃	瑄	瑅	瑆	瑇	瑈	瑉	瑊	瑋	瑌	瑍	瑎	瑏
U+745x	瑐	瑑	瑒	瑓	瑔	瑕	瑖	瑗	瑘	瑙	瑚	瑛	瑜	瑝	瑞	瑟
U+746x	瑠	瑡	瑢	瑣	瑤	瑥	瑦	瑧	瑨	瑩	瑪	瑫	瑬	瑭	瑮	瑯
U+747x	瑰	瑱	瑲	瑳	瑴	瑵	瑶	瑷	瑸	瑹	瑺	瑻	瑼	瑽	瑾	瑿
U+748x	璀	璁	璂	璃	璄	璅	璆	璇	璈	璉	璊	璋	璌	璍	璎	璏
U+749x	璐	璑	璒	璓	璔	璕	璖	璗	璘	璙	璚	璛	璜	璝	璞	璟
U+74Ax	璠	璡	璢	璣	璤	璥	璦	璧	璨	璩	璪	璫	璬	璭	璮	璯
U+74Bx	環	璱	璲	璳	璴	璵	璶	璷	璸	璹	璺	璻	璼	璽	璾	璿
U+74Cx	瓀	瓁	瓂	瓃	瓄	瓅	瓆	瓇	瓈	瓉	瓊	瓋	瓌	瓍	瓎	瓏
U+74Dx	瓐	瓑	瓒	瓓	瓔	瓕	瓖	瓗	瓘	瓙	瓚	瓛	瓜	瓝	瓞	瓟
U+74Ex	瓠	瓡	瓢	瓣	瓤	瓥	瓦	瓧	瓨	瓩	瓪	瓫	瓬	瓭	瓮	瓯
U+74Fx	瓰	瓱	瓲	瓳	瓴	瓵	瓶	瓷	瓸	瓹	瓺	瓻	瓼	瓽	瓾	瓿
U+750x	甀	甁	甂	甃	甄	甅	甆	甇	甈	甉	甊	甋	甌	甍	甎	甏
U+751x	甐	甑	甒	甓	甔	甕	甖	甗	甘	甙	甚	甛	甜	甝	甞	生
U+752x	甠	甡	產	産	甤	甥	甦	甧	用	甩	甪	甫	甬	甭	甮	甯
U+753x	田	由	甲	申	甴	电	甶	男	甸	甹	町	画	甼	甽	甾	甿
U+754x	畀	畁	畂	畃	畄	畅	畆	畇	畈	畉	畊	畋	界	畍	畎	畏
U+755x	畐	畑	畒	畓	畔	畕	畖	畗	畘	留	畚	畛	畜	畝	畞	畟
U+756x	畠	畡	畢	畣	畤	略	畦	畧	畨	畩	番	畫	畬	畭	畮	畯
U+757x	異	畱	畲	畳	畴	畵	當	畷	畸	畹	畺	畻	畼	畽	畾	畿
U+758x	疀	疁	疂	疃	疄	疅	疆	疇	疈	疉	疊	疋	疌	疍	疎	疏
U+759x	疐	疑	疒	疓	疔	疕	疖	疗	疘	疙	疚	疛	疜	疝	疞	疟
U+75Ax	疠	疡	疢	疣	疤	疥	疦	疧	疨	疩	疪	疫	疬	疭	疮	疯
U+75Bx	疰	疱	疲	疳	疴	疵	疶	疷	疸	疹	疺	疻	疼	疽	疾	疿
U+75Cx	痀	痁	痂	痃	痄	病	痆	症	痈	痉	痊	痋	痌	痍	痎	痏
U+75Dx	痐	痑	痒	痓	痔	痕	痖	痗	痘	痙	痚	痛	痜	痝	痞	痟
U+75Ex	痠	痡	痢	痣	痤	痥	痦	痧	痨	痩	痪	痫	痬	痭	痮	痯
U+75Fx	痰	痱	痲	痳	痴	痵	痶	痷	痸	痹	痺	痻	痼	痽	痾	痿
U+760x	瘀	瘁	瘂	瘃	瘄	瘅	瘆	瘇	瘈	瘉	瘊	瘋	瘌	瘍	瘎	瘏
U+761x	瘐	瘑	瘒	瘓	瘔	瘕	瘖	瘗	瘘	瘙	瘚	瘛	瘜	瘝	瘞	瘟
U+762x	瘠	瘡	瘢	瘣	瘤	瘥	瘦	瘧	瘨	瘩	瘪	瘫	瘬	瘭	瘮	瘯
U+763x	瘰	瘱	瘲	瘳	瘴	瘵	瘶	瘷	瘸	瘹	瘺	瘻	瘼	瘽	瘾	瘿
U+764x	癀	癁	療	癃	癄	癅	癆	癇	癈	癉	癊	癋	癌	癍	癎	癏
U+765x	癐	癑	癒	癓	癔	癕	癖	癗	癘	癙	癚	癛	癜	癝	癞	癟
U+766x	癠	癡	癢	癣	癤	癥	癦	癧	癨	癩	癪	癫	癬	癭	癮	癯
U+767x	癰	癱	癲	癳	癴	癵	癶	癷	癸	癹	発	登	發	白	百	癿
U+768x	皀	皁	皂	皃	的	皅	皆	皇	皈	皉	皊	皋	皌	皍	皎	皏
U+769x	皐	皑	皒	皓	皔	皕	皖	皗	皘	皙	皚	皛	皜	皝	皞	皟
U+76Ax	皠	皡	皢	皣	皤	皥	皦	皧	皨	皩	皪	皫	皬	皭	皮	皯
U+76Bx	皰	皱	皲	皳	皴	皵	皶	皷	皸	皹	皺	皻	皼	皽	皾	皿
U+76Cx	盀	盁	盂	盃	盄	盅	盆	盇	盈	盉	益	盋	盌	盍	盎	盏
U+76Dx	盐	监	盒	盓	盔	盕	盖	盗	盘	盙	盚	盛	盜	盝	盞	盟
U+76Ex	盠	盡	盢	監	盤	盥	盦	盧	盨	盩	盪	盫	盬	盭	目	盯
U+76Fx	盰	盱	盲	盳	直	盵	盶	盷	相	盹	盺	盻	盼	盽	盾	盿
U+770x	眀	省	眂	眃	眄	眅	眆	眇	眈	眉	眊	看	県	眍	眎	眏
U+771x	眐	眑	眒	眓	眔	眕	眖	眗	眘	眙	眚	眛	眜	眝	眞	真
U+772x	眠	眡	眢	眣	眤	眥	眦	眧	眨	眩	眪	眫	眬	眭	眮	眯
U+773x	眰	眱	眲	眳	眴	眵	眶	眷	眸	眹	眺	眻	眼	眽	眾	眿
U+774x	着	睁	睂	睃	睄	睅	睆	睇	睈	睉	睊	睋	睌	睍	睎	睏
U+775x	睐	睑	睒	睓	睔	睕	睖	睗	睘	睙	睚	睛	睜	睝	睞	睟
U+776x	睠	睡	睢	督	睤	睥	睦	睧	睨	睩	睪	睫	睬	睭	睮	睯
U+777x	睰	睱	睲	睳	睴	睵	睶	睷	睸	睹	睺	睻	睼	睽	睾	睿
U+778x	瞀	瞁	瞂	瞃	瞄	瞅	瞆	瞇	瞈	瞉	瞊	瞋	瞌	瞍	瞎	瞏
U+779x	瞐	瞑	瞒	瞓	瞔	瞕	瞖	瞗	瞘	瞙	瞚	瞛	瞜	瞝	瞞	瞟
U+77Ax	瞠	瞡	瞢	瞣	瞤	瞥	瞦	瞧	瞨	瞩	瞪	瞫	瞬	瞭	瞮	瞯
U+77Bx	瞰	瞱	瞲	瞳	瞴	瞵	瞶	瞷	瞸	瞹	瞺	瞻	瞼	瞽	瞾	瞿
U+77Cx	矀	矁	矂	矃	矄	矅	矆	矇	矈	矉	矊	矋	矌	矍	矎	矏
U+77Dx	矐	矑	矒	矓	矔	矕	矖	矗	矘	矙	矚	矛	矜	矝	矞	矟
U+77Ex	矠	矡	矢	矣	矤	知	矦	矧	矨	矩	矪	矫	矬	短	矮	矯
U+77Fx	矰	矱	矲	石	矴	矵	矶	矷	矸	矹	矺	矻	矼	矽	矾	矿
U+780x	砀	码	砂	砃	砄	砅	砆	砇	砈	砉	砊	砋	砌	砍	砎	砏
U+781x	砐	砑	砒	砓	研	砕	砖	砗	砘	砙	砚	砛	砜	砝	砞	砟
U+782x	砠	砡	砢	砣	砤	砥	砦	砧	砨	砩	砪	砫	砬	砭	砮	砯
U+783x	砰	砱	砲	砳	破	砵	砶	砷	砸	砹	砺	砻	砼	砽	砾	砿
U+784x	础	硁	硂	硃	硄	硅	硆	硇	硈	硉	硊	硋	硌	硍	硎	硏
U+785x	硐	硑	硒	硓	硔	硕	硖	硗	硘	硙	硚	硛	硜	硝	硞	硟
U+786x	硠	硡	硢	硣	硤	硥	硦	硧	硨	硩	硪	硫	硬	硭	确	硯
U+787x	硰	硱	硲	硳	硴	硵	硶	硷	硸	硹	硺	硻	硼	硽	硾	硿
U+788x	碀	碁	碂	碃	碄	碅	碆	碇	碈	碉	碊	碋	碌	碍	碎	碏
U+789x	碐	碑	碒	碓	碔	碕	碖	碗	碘	碙	碚	碛	碜	碝	碞	碟
U+78Ax	碠	碡	碢	碣	碤	碥	碦	碧	碨	碩	碪	碫	碬	碭	碮	碯
U+78Bx	碰	碱	碲	碳	碴	碵	碶	碷	碸	碹	確	碻	碼	碽	碾	碿
U+78Cx	磀	磁	磂	磃	磄	磅	磆	磇	磈	磉	磊	磋	磌	磍	磎	磏
U+78Dx	磐	磑	磒	磓	磔	磕	磖	磗	磘	磙	磚	磛	磜	磝	磞	磟
U+78Ex	磠	磡	磢	磣	磤	磥	磦	磧	磨	磩	磪	磫	磬	磭	磮	磯
U+78Fx	磰	磱	磲	磳	磴	磵	磶	磷	磸	磹	磺	磻	磼	磽	磾	磿
U+790x	礀	礁	礂	礃	礄	礅	礆	礇	礈	礉	礊	礋	礌	礍	礎	礏
U+791x	礐	礑	礒	礓	礔	礕	礖	礗	礘	礙	礚	礛	礜	礝	礞	礟
U+792x	礠	礡	礢	礣	礤	礥	礦	礧	礨	礩	礪	礫	礬	礭	礮	礯
U+793x	礰	礱	礲	礳	礴	礵	礶	礷	礸	礹	示	礻	礼	礽	社	礿
U+794x	祀	祁	祂	祃	祄	祅	祆	祇	祈	祉	祊	祋	祌	祍	祎	祏
U+795x	祐	祑	祒	祓	祔	祕	祖	祗	祘	祙	祚	祛	祜	祝	神	祟
U+796x	祠	祡	祢	祣	祤	祥	祦	祧	票	祩	祪	祫	祬	祭	祮	祯
U+797x	祰	祱	祲	祳	祴	祵	祶	祷	祸	祹	祺	祻	祼	祽	祾	祿
U+798x	禀	禁	禂	禃	禄	禅	禆	禇	禈	禉	禊	禋	禌	禍	禎	福
U+799x	禐	禑	禒	禓	禔	禕	禖	禗	禘	禙	禚	禛	禜	禝	禞	禟
U+79Ax	禠	禡	禢	禣	禤	禥	禦	禧	禨	禩	禪	禫	禬	禭	禮	禯
U+79Bx	禰	禱	禲	禳	禴	禵	禶	禷	禸	禹	禺	离	禼	禽	禾	禿
U+79Cx	秀	私	秂	秃	秄	秅	秆	秇	秈	秉	秊	秋	秌	种	秎	秏
U+79Dx	秐	科	秒	秓	秔	秕	秖	秗	秘	秙	秚	秛	秜	秝	秞	租
U+79Ex	秠	秡	秢	秣	秤	秥	秦	秧	秨	秩	秪	秫	秬	秭	秮	积
U+79Fx	称	秱	秲	秳	秴	秵	秶	秷	秸	秹	秺	移	秼	秽	秾	秿
U+7A0x	稀	稁	稂	稃	稄	稅	稆	稇	稈	稉	稊	程	稌	稍	税	稏
U+7A1x	稐	稑	稒	稓	稔	稕	稖	稗	稘	稙	稚	稛	稜	稝	稞	稟
U+7A2x	稠	稡	稢	稣	稤	稥	稦	稧	稨	稩	稪	稫	稬	稭	種	稯
U+7A3x	稰	稱	稲	稳	稴	稵	稶	稷	稸	稹	稺	稻	稼	稽	稾	稿
U+7A4x	穀	穁	穂	穃	穄	穅	穆	穇	穈	穉	穊	穋	穌	積	穎	穏
U+7A5x	穐	穑	穒	穓	穔	穕	穖	穗	穘	穙	穚	穛	穜	穝	穞	穟
U+7A6x	穠	穡	穢	穣	穤	穥	穦	穧	穨	穩	穪	穫	穬	穭	穮	穯
U+7A7x	穰	穱	穲	穳	穴	穵	究	穷	穸	穹	空	穻	穼	穽	穾	穿
U+7A8x	窀	突	窂	窃	窄	窅	窆	窇	窈	窉	窊	窋	窌	窍	窎	窏
U+7A9x	窐	窑	窒	窓	窔	窕	窖	窗	窘	窙	窚	窛	窜	窝	窞	窟
U+7AAx	窠	窡	窢	窣	窤	窥	窦	窧	窨	窩	窪	窫	窬	窭	窮	窯
U+7ABx	窰	窱	窲	窳	窴	窵	窶	窷	窸	窹	窺	窻	窼	窽	窾	窿
U+7ACx	竀	竁	竂	竃	竄	竅	竆	竇	竈	竉	竊	立	竌	竍	竎	竏
U+7ADx	竐	竑	竒	竓	竔	竕	竖	竗	竘	站	竚	竛	竜	竝	竞	竟
U+7AEx	章	竡	竢	竣	竤	童	竦	竧	竨	竩	竪	竫	竬	竭	竮	端
U+7AFx	竰	竱	竲	竳	竴	竵	競	竷	竸	竹	竺	竻	竼	竽	竾	竿
U+7B0x	笀	笁	笂	笃	笄	笅	笆	笇	笈	笉	笊	笋	笌	笍	笎	笏
U+7B1x	笐	笑	笒	笓	笔	笕	笖	笗	笘	笙	笚	笛	笜	笝	笞	笟
U+7B2x	笠	笡	笢	笣	笤	笥	符	笧	笨	笩	笪	笫	第	笭	笮	笯
U+7B3x	笰	笱	笲	笳	笴	笵	笶	笷	笸	笹	笺	笻	笼	笽	笾	笿
U+7B4x	筀	筁	筂	筃	筄	筅	筆	筇	筈	等	筊	筋	筌	筍	筎	筏
U+7B5x	筐	筑	筒	筓	答	筕	策	筗	筘	筙	筚	筛	筜	筝	筞	筟
U+7B6x	筠	筡	筢	筣	筤	筥	筦	筧	筨	筩	筪	筫	筬	筭	筮	筯
U+7B7x	筰	筱	筲	筳	筴	筵	筶	筷	筸	筹	筺	筻	筼	筽	签	筿
U+7B8x	简	箁	箂	箃	箄	箅	箆	箇	箈	箉	箊	箋	箌	箍	箎	箏
U+7B9x	箐	箑	箒	箓	箔	箕	箖	算	箘	箙	箚	箛	箜	箝	箞	箟
U+7BAx	箠	管	箢	箣	箤	箥	箦	箧	箨	箩	箪	箫	箬	箭	箮	箯
U+7BBx	箰	箱	箲	箳	箴	箵	箶	箷	箸	箹	箺	箻	箼	箽	箾	箿
U+7BCx	節	篁	篂	篃	範	篅	篆	篇	篈	築	篊	篋	篌	篍	篎	篏
U+7BDx	篐	篑	篒	篓	篔	篕	篖	篗	篘	篙	篚	篛	篜	篝	篞	篟
U+7BEx	篠	篡	篢	篣	篤	篥	篦	篧	篨	篩	篪	篫	篬	篭	篮	篯
U+7BFx	篰	篱	篲	篳	篴	篵	篶	篷	篸	篹	篺	篻	篼	篽	篾	篿
U+7C0x	簀	簁	簂	簃	簄	簅	簆	簇	簈	簉	簊	簋	簌	簍	簎	簏
U+7C1x	簐	簑	簒	簓	簔	簕	簖	簗	簘	簙	簚	簛	簜	簝	簞	簟
U+7C2x	簠	簡	簢	簣	簤	簥	簦	簧	簨	簩	簪	簫	簬	簭	簮	簯
U+7C3x	簰	簱	簲	簳	簴	簵	簶	簷	簸	簹	簺	簻	簼	簽	簾	簿
U+7C4x	籀	籁	籂	籃	籄	籅	籆	籇	籈	籉	籊	籋	籌	籍	籎	籏
U+7C5x	籐	籑	籒	籓	籔	籕	籖	籗	籘	籙	籚	籛	籜	籝	籞	籟
U+7C6x	籠	籡	籢	籣	籤	籥	籦	籧	籨	籩	籪	籫	籬	籭	籮	籯
U+7C7x	籰	籱	籲	米	籴	籵	籶	籷	籸	籹	籺	类	籼	籽	籾	籿
U+7C8x	粀	粁	粂	粃	粄	粅	粆	粇	粈	粉	粊	粋	粌	粍	粎	粏
U+7C9x	粐	粑	粒	粓	粔	粕	粖	粗	粘	粙	粚	粛	粜	粝	粞	粟
U+7CAx	粠	粡	粢	粣	粤	粥	粦	粧	粨	粩	粪	粫	粬	粭	粮	粯
U+7CBx	粰	粱	粲	粳	粴	粵	粶	粷	粸	粹	粺	粻	粼	粽	精	粿
U+7CCx	糀	糁	糂	糃	糄	糅	糆	糇	糈	糉	糊	糋	糌	糍	糎	糏
U+7CDx	糐	糑	糒	糓	糔	糕	糖	糗	糘	糙	糚	糛	糜	糝	糞	糟
U+7CEx	糠	糡	糢	糣	糤	糥	糦	糧	糨	糩	糪	糫	糬	糭	糮	糯
U+7CFx	糰	糱	糲	糳	糴	糵	糶	糷	糸	糹	糺	系	糼	糽	糾	糿
U+7D0x	紀	紁	紂	紃	約	紅	紆	紇	紈	紉	紊	紋	紌	納	紎	紏
U+7D1x	紐	紑	紒	紓	純	紕	紖	紗	紘	紙	級	紛	紜	紝	紞	紟
U+7D2x	素	紡	索	紣	紤	紥	紦	紧	紨	紩	紪	紫	紬	紭	紮	累
U+7D3x	細	紱	紲	紳	紴	紵	紶	紷	紸	紹	紺	紻	紼	紽	紾	紿
U+7D4x	絀	絁	終	絃	組	絅	絆	絇	絈	絉	絊	絋	経	絍	絎	絏
U+7D5x	結	絑	絒	絓	絔	絕	絖	絗	絘	絙	絚	絛	絜	絝	絞	絟
U+7D6x	絠	絡	絢	絣	絤	絥	給	絧	絨	絩	絪	絫	絬	絭	絮	絯
U+7D7x	絰	統	絲	絳	絴	絵	絶	絷	絸	絹	絺	絻	絼	絽	絾	絿
U+7D8x	綀	綁	綂	綃	綄	綅	綆	綇	綈	綉	綊	綋	綌	綍	綎	綏
U+7D9x	綐	綑	綒	經	綔	綕	綖	綗	綘	継	続	綛	綜	綝	綞	綟
U+7DAx	綠	綡	綢	綣	綤	綥	綦	綧	綨	綩	綪	綫	綬	維	綮	綯
U+7DBx	綰	綱	網	綳	綴	綵	綶	綷	綸	綹	綺	綻	綼	綽	綾	綿
U+7DCx	緀	緁	緂	緃	緄	緅	緆	緇	緈	緉	緊	緋	緌	緍	緎	総
U+7DDx	緐	緑	緒	緓	緔	緕	緖	緗	緘	緙	線	緛	緜	緝	緞	緟
U+7DEx	締	緡	緢	緣	緤	緥	緦	緧	編	緩	緪	緫	緬	緭	緮	緯
U+7DFx	緰	緱	緲	緳	練	緵	緶	緷	緸	緹	緺	緻	緼	緽	緾	緿
U+7E0x	縀	縁	縂	縃	縄	縅	縆	縇	縈	縉	縊	縋	縌	縍	縎	縏
U+7E1x	縐	縑	縒	縓	縔	縕	縖	縗	縘	縙	縚	縛	縜	縝	縞	縟
U+7E2x	縠	縡	縢	縣	縤	縥	縦	縧	縨	縩	縪	縫	縬	縭	縮	縯
U+7E3x	縰	縱	縲	縳	縴	縵	縶	縷	縸	縹	縺	縻	縼	總	績	縿
U+7E4x	繀	繁	繂	繃	繄	繅	繆	繇	繈	繉	繊	繋	繌	繍	繎	繏
U+7E5x	繐	繑	繒	繓	織	繕	繖	繗	繘	繙	繚	繛	繜	繝	繞	繟
U+7E6x	繠	繡	繢	繣	繤	繥	繦	繧	繨	繩	繪	繫	繬	繭	繮	繯
U+7E7x	繰	繱	繲	繳	繴	繵	繶	繷	繸	繹	繺	繻	繼	繽	繾	繿
U+7E8x	纀	纁	纂	纃	纄	纅	纆	纇	纈	纉	纊	纋	續	纍	纎	纏
U+7E9x	纐	纑	纒	纓	纔	纕	纖	纗	纘	纙	纚	纛	纜	纝	纞	纟
U+7EAx	纠	纡	红	纣	纤	纥	约	级	纨	纩	纪	纫	纬	纭	纮	纯
U+7EBx	纰	纱	纲	纳	纴	纵	纶	纷	纸	纹	纺	纻	纼	纽	纾	线
U+7ECx	绀	绁	绂	练	组	绅	细	织	终	绉	绊	绋	绌	绍	绎	经
U+7EDx	绐	绑	绒	结	绔	绕	绖	绗	绘	给	绚	绛	络	绝	绞	统
U+7EEx	绠	绡	绢	绣	绤	绥	绦	继	绨	绩	绪	绫	绬	续	绮	绯
U+7EFx	绰	绱	绲	绳	维	绵	绶	绷	绸	绹	绺	绻	综	绽	绾	绿
U+7F0x	缀	缁	缂	缃	缄	缅	缆	缇	缈	缉	缊	缋	缌	缍	缎	缏
U+7F1x	缐	缑	缒	缓	缔	缕	编	缗	缘	缙	缚	缛	缜	缝	缞	缟
U+7F2x	缠	缡	缢	缣	缤	缥	缦	缧	缨	缩	缪	缫	缬	缭	缮	缯
U+7F3x	缰	缱	缲	缳	缴	缵	缶	缷	缸	缹	缺	缻	缼	缽	缾	缿
U+7F4x	罀	罁	罂	罃	罄	罅	罆	罇	罈	罉	罊	罋	罌	罍	罎	罏
U+7F5x	罐	网	罒	罓	罔	罕	罖	罗	罘	罙	罚	罛	罜	罝	罞	罟
U+7F6x	罠	罡	罢	罣	罤	罥	罦	罧	罨	罩	罪	罫	罬	罭	置	罯
U+7F7x	罰	罱	署	罳	罴	罵	罶	罷	罸	罹	罺	罻	罼	罽	罾	罿
U+7F8x	羀	羁	羂	羃	羄	羅	羆	羇	羈	羉	羊	羋	羌	羍	美	羏
U+7F9x	羐	羑	羒	羓	羔	羕	羖	羗	羘	羙	羚	羛	羜	羝	羞	羟
U+7FAx	羠	羡	羢	羣	群	羥	羦	羧	羨	義	羪	羫	羬	羭	羮	羯
U+7FBx	羰	羱	羲	羳	羴	羵	羶	羷	羸	羹	羺	羻	羼	羽	羾	羿
U+7FCx	翀	翁	翂	翃	翄	翅	翆	翇	翈	翉	翊	翋	翌	翍	翎	翏
U+7FDx	翐	翑	習	翓	翔	翕	翖	翗	翘	翙	翚	翛	翜	翝	翞	翟
U+7FEx	翠	翡	翢	翣	翤	翥	翦	翧	翨	翩	翪	翫	翬	翭	翮	翯
U+7FFx	翰	翱	翲	翳	翴	翵	翶	翷	翸	翹	翺	翻	翼	翽	翾	翿
U+800x	耀	老	耂	考	耄	者	耆	耇	耈	耉	耊	耋	而	耍	耎	耏
U+801x	耐	耑	耒	耓	耔	耕	耖	耗	耘	耙	耚	耛	耜	耝	耞	耟
U+802x	耠	耡	耢	耣	耤	耥	耦	耧	耨	耩	耪	耫	耬	耭	耮	耯
U+803x	耰	耱	耲	耳	耴	耵	耶	耷	耸	耹	耺	耻	耼	耽	耾	耿
U+804x	聀	聁	聂	聃	聄	聅	聆	聇	聈	聉	聊	聋	职	聍	聎	聏
U+805x	聐	聑	聒	聓	联	聕	聖	聗	聘	聙	聚	聛	聜	聝	聞	聟
U+806x	聠	聡	聢	聣	聤	聥	聦	聧	聨	聩	聪	聫	聬	聭	聮	聯
U+807x	聰	聱	聲	聳	聴	聵	聶	職	聸	聹	聺	聻	聼	聽	聾	聿
U+808x	肀	肁	肂	肃	肄	肅	肆	肇	肈	肉	肊	肋	肌	肍	肎	肏
U+809x	肐	肑	肒	肓	肔	肕	肖	肗	肘	肙	肚	肛	肜	肝	肞	肟
U+80Ax	肠	股	肢	肣	肤	肥	肦	肧	肨	肩	肪	肫	肬	肭	肮	肯
U+80Bx	肰	肱	育	肳	肴	肵	肶	肷	肸	肹	肺	肻	肼	肽	肾	肿
U+80Cx	胀	胁	胂	胃	胄	胅	胆	胇	胈	胉	胊	胋	背	胍	胎	胏
U+80Dx	胐	胑	胒	胓	胔	胕	胖	胗	胘	胙	胚	胛	胜	胝	胞	胟
U+80Ex	胠	胡	胢	胣	胤	胥	胦	胧	胨	胩	胪	胫	胬	胭	胮	胯
U+80Fx	胰	胱	胲	胳	胴	胵	胶	胷	胸	胹	胺	胻	胼	能	胾	胿
U+810x	脀	脁	脂	脃	脄	脅	脆	脇	脈	脉	脊	脋	脌	脍	脎	脏
U+811x	脐	脑	脒	脓	脔	脕	脖	脗	脘	脙	脚	脛	脜	脝	脞	脟
U+812x	脠	脡	脢	脣	脤	脥	脦	脧	脨	脩	脪	脫	脬	脭	脮	脯
U+813x	脰	脱	脲	脳	脴	脵	脶	脷	脸	脹	脺	脻	脼	脽	脾	脿
U+814x	腀	腁	腂	腃	腄	腅	腆	腇	腈	腉	腊	腋	腌	腍	腎	腏
U+815x	腐	腑	腒	腓	腔	腕	腖	腗	腘	腙	腚	腛	腜	腝	腞	腟
U+816x	腠	腡	腢	腣	腤	腥	腦	腧	腨	腩	腪	腫	腬	腭	腮	腯
U+817x	腰	腱	腲	腳	腴	腵	腶	腷	腸	腹	腺	腻	腼	腽	腾	腿
U+818x	膀	膁	膂	膃	膄	膅	膆	膇	膈	膉	膊	膋	膌	膍	膎	膏
U+819x	膐	膑	膒	膓	膔	膕	膖	膗	膘	膙	膚	膛	膜	膝	膞	膟
U+81Ax	膠	膡	膢	膣	膤	膥	膦	膧	膨	膩	膪	膫	膬	膭	膮	膯
U+81Bx	膰	膱	膲	膳	膴	膵	膶	膷	膸	膹	膺	膻	膼	膽	膾	膿
U+81Cx	臀	臁	臂	臃	臄	臅	臆	臇	臈	臉	臊	臋	臌	臍	臎	臏
U+81Dx	臐	臑	臒	臓	臔	臕	臖	臗	臘	臙	臚	臛	臜	臝	臞	臟
U+81Ex	臠	臡	臢	臣	臤	臥	臦	臧	臨	臩	自	臫	臬	臭	臮	臯
U+81Fx	臰	臱	臲	至	致	臵	臶	臷	臸	臹	臺	臻	臼	臽	臾	臿
U+820x	舀	舁	舂	舃	舄	舅	舆	與	興	舉	舊	舋	舌	舍	舎	舏
U+821x	舐	舑	舒	舓	舔	舕	舖	舗	舘	舙	舚	舛	舜	舝	舞	舟
U+822x	舠	舡	舢	舣	舤	舥	舦	舧	舨	舩	航	舫	般	舭	舮	舯
U+823x	舰	舱	舲	舳	舴	舵	舶	舷	舸	船	舺	舻	舼	舽	舾	舿
U+824x	艀	艁	艂	艃	艄	艅	艆	艇	艈	艉	艊	艋	艌	艍	艎	艏
U+825x	艐	艑	艒	艓	艔	艕	艖	艗	艘	艙	艚	艛	艜	艝	艞	艟
U+826x	艠	艡	艢	艣	艤	艥	艦	艧	艨	艩	艪	艫	艬	艭	艮	良
U+827x	艰	艱	色	艳	艴	艵	艶	艷	艸	艹	艺	艻	艼	艽	艾	艿
U+828x	芀	芁	节	芃	芄	芅	芆	芇	芈	芉	芊	芋	芌	芍	芎	芏
U+829x	芐	芑	芒	芓	芔	芕	芖	芗	芘	芙	芚	芛	芜	芝	芞	芟
U+82Ax	芠	芡	芢	芣	芤	芥	芦	芧	芨	芩	芪	芫	芬	芭	芮	芯
U+82Bx	芰	花	芲	芳	芴	芵	芶	芷	芸	芹	芺	芻	芼	芽	芾	芿
U+82Cx	苀	苁	苂	苃	苄	苅	苆	苇	苈	苉	苊	苋	苌	苍	苎	苏
U+82Dx	苐	苑	苒	苓	苔	苕	苖	苗	苘	苙	苚	苛	苜	苝	苞	苟
U+82Ex	苠	苡	苢	苣	苤	若	苦	苧	苨	苩	苪	苫	苬	苭	苮	苯
U+82Fx	苰	英	苲	苳	苴	苵	苶	苷	苸	苹	苺	苻	苼	苽	苾	苿
U+830x	茀	茁	茂	范	茄	茅	茆	茇	茈	茉	茊	茋	茌	茍	茎	茏
U+831x	茐	茑	茒	茓	茔	茕	茖	茗	茘	茙	茚	茛	茜	茝	茞	茟
U+832x	茠	茡	茢	茣	茤	茥	茦	茧	茨	茩	茪	茫	茬	茭	茮	茯
U+833x	茰	茱	茲	茳	茴	茵	茶	茷	茸	茹	茺	茻	茼	茽	茾	茿
U+834x	荀	荁	荂	荃	荄	荅	荆	荇	荈	草	荊	荋	荌	荍	荎	荏
U+835x	荐	荑	荒	荓	荔	荕	荖	荗	荘	荙	荚	荛	荜	荝	荞	荟
U+836x	荠	荡	荢	荣	荤	荥	荦	荧	荨	荩	荪	荫	荬	荭	荮	药
U+837x	荰	荱	荲	荳	荴	荵	荶	荷	荸	荹	荺	荻	荼	荽	荾	荿
U+838x	莀	莁	莂	莃	莄	莅	莆	莇	莈	莉	莊	莋	莌	莍	莎	莏
U+839x	莐	莑	莒	莓	莔	莕	莖	莗	莘	莙	莚	莛	莜	莝	莞	莟
U+83Ax	莠	莡	莢	莣	莤	莥	莦	莧	莨	莩	莪	莫	莬	莭	莮	莯
U+83Bx	莰	莱	莲	莳	莴	莵	莶	获	莸	莹	莺	莻	莼	莽	莾	莿
U+83Cx	菀	菁	菂	菃	菄	菅	菆	菇	菈	菉	菊	菋	菌	菍	菎	菏
U+83Dx	菐	菑	菒	菓	菔	菕	菖	菗	菘	菙	菚	菛	菜	菝	菞	菟
U+83Ex	菠	菡	菢	菣	菤	菥	菦	菧	菨	菩	菪	菫	菬	菭	菮	華
U+83Fx	菰	菱	菲	菳	菴	菵	菶	菷	菸	菹	菺	菻	菼	菽	菾	菿
U+840x	萀	萁	萂	萃	萄	萅	萆	萇	萈	萉	萊	萋	萌	萍	萎	萏
U+841x	萐	萑	萒	萓	萔	萕	萖	萗	萘	萙	萚	萛	萜	萝	萞	萟
U+842x	萠	萡	萢	萣	萤	营	萦	萧	萨	萩	萪	萫	萬	萭	萮	萯
U+843x	萰	萱	萲	萳	萴	萵	萶	萷	萸	萹	萺	萻	萼	落	萾	萿
U+844x	葀	葁	葂	葃	葄	葅	葆	葇	葈	葉	葊	葋	葌	葍	葎	葏
U+845x	葐	葑	葒	葓	葔	葕	葖	著	葘	葙	葚	葛	葜	葝	葞	葟
U+846x	葠	葡	葢	董	葤	葥	葦	葧	葨	葩	葪	葫	葬	葭	葮	葯
U+847x	葰	葱	葲	葳	葴	葵	葶	葷	葸	葹	葺	葻	葼	葽	葾	葿
U+848x	蒀	蒁	蒂	蒃	蒄	蒅	蒆	蒇	蒈	蒉	蒊	蒋	蒌	蒍	蒎	蒏
U+849x	蒐	蒑	蒒	蒓	蒔	蒕	蒖	蒗	蒘	蒙	蒚	蒛	蒜	蒝	蒞	蒟
U+84Ax	蒠	蒡	蒢	蒣	蒤	蒥	蒦	蒧	蒨	蒩	蒪	蒫	蒬	蒭	蒮	蒯
U+84Bx	蒰	蒱	蒲	蒳	蒴	蒵	蒶	蒷	蒸	蒹	蒺	蒻	蒼	蒽	蒾	蒿
U+84Cx	蓀	蓁	蓂	蓃	蓄	蓅	蓆	蓇	蓈	蓉	蓊	蓋	蓌	蓍	蓎	蓏
U+84Dx	蓐	蓑	蓒	蓓	蓔	蓕	蓖	蓗	蓘	蓙	蓚	蓛	蓜	蓝	蓞	蓟
U+84Ex	蓠	蓡	蓢	蓣	蓤	蓥	蓦	蓧	蓨	蓩	蓪	蓫	蓬	蓭	蓮	蓯
U+84Fx	蓰	蓱	蓲	蓳	蓴	蓵	蓶	蓷	蓸	蓹	蓺	蓻	蓼	蓽	蓾	蓿
U+850x	蔀	蔁	蔂	蔃	蔄	蔅	蔆	蔇	蔈	蔉	蔊	蔋	蔌	蔍	蔎	蔏
U+851x	蔐	蔑	蔒	蔓	蔔	蔕	蔖	蔗	蔘	蔙	蔚	蔛	蔜	蔝	蔞	蔟
U+852x	蔠	蔡	蔢	蔣	蔤	蔥	蔦	蔧	蔨	蔩	蔪	蔫	蔬	蔭	蔮	蔯
U+853x	蔰	蔱	蔲	蔳	蔴	蔵	蔶	蔷	蔸	蔹	蔺	蔻	蔼	蔽	蔾	蔿
U+854x	蕀	蕁	蕂	蕃	蕄	蕅	蕆	蕇	蕈	蕉	蕊	蕋	蕌	蕍	蕎	蕏
U+855x	蕐	蕑	蕒	蕓	蕔	蕕	蕖	蕗	蕘	蕙	蕚	蕛	蕜	蕝	蕞	蕟
U+856x	蕠	蕡	蕢	蕣	蕤	蕥	蕦	蕧	蕨	蕩	蕪	蕫	蕬	蕭	蕮	蕯
U+857x	蕰	蕱	蕲	蕳	蕴	蕵	蕶	蕷	蕸	蕹	蕺	蕻	蕼	蕽	蕾	蕿
U+858x	薀	薁	薂	薃	薄	薅	薆	薇	薈	薉	薊	薋	薌	薍	薎	薏
U+859x	薐	薑	薒	薓	薔	薕	薖	薗	薘	薙	薚	薛	薜	薝	薞	薟
U+85Ax	薠	薡	薢	薣	薤	薥	薦	薧	薨	薩	薪	薫	薬	薭	薮	薯
U+85Bx	薰	薱	薲	薳	薴	薵	薶	薷	薸	薹	薺	薻	薼	薽	薾	薿
U+85Cx	藀	藁	藂	藃	藄	藅	藆	藇	藈	藉	藊	藋	藌	藍	藎	藏
U+85Dx	藐	藑	藒	藓	藔	藕	藖	藗	藘	藙	藚	藛	藜	藝	藞	藟
U+85Ex	藠	藡	藢	藣	藤	藥	藦	藧	藨	藩	藪	藫	藬	藭	藮	藯
U+85Fx	藰	藱	藲	藳	藴	藵	藶	藷	藸	藹	藺	藻	藼	藽	藾	藿
U+860x	蘀	蘁	蘂	蘃	蘄	蘅	蘆	蘇	蘈	蘉	蘊	蘋	蘌	蘍	蘎	蘏
U+861x	蘐	蘑	蘒	蘓	蘔	蘕	蘖	蘗	蘘	蘙	蘚	蘛	蘜	蘝	蘞	蘟
U+862x	蘠	蘡	蘢	蘣	蘤	蘥	蘦	蘧	蘨	蘩	蘪	蘫	蘬	蘭	蘮	蘯
U+863x	蘰	蘱	蘲	蘳	蘴	蘵	蘶	蘷	蘸	蘹	蘺	蘻	蘼	蘽	蘾	蘿
U+864x	虀	虁	虂	虃	虄	虅	虆	虇	虈	虉	虊	虋	虌	虍	虎	虏
U+865x	虐	虑	虒	虓	虔	處	虖	虗	虘	虙	虚	虛	虜	虝	虞	號
U+866x	虠	虡	虢	虣	虤	虥	虦	虧	虨	虩	虪	虫	虬	虭	虮	虯
U+867x	虰	虱	虲	虳	虴	虵	虶	虷	虸	虹	虺	虻	虼	虽	虾	虿
U+868x	蚀	蚁	蚂	蚃	蚄	蚅	蚆	蚇	蚈	蚉	蚊	蚋	蚌	蚍	蚎	蚏
U+869x	蚐	蚑	蚒	蚓	蚔	蚕	蚖	蚗	蚘	蚙	蚚	蚛	蚜	蚝	蚞	蚟
U+86Ax	蚠	蚡	蚢	蚣	蚤	蚥	蚦	蚧	蚨	蚩	蚪	蚫	蚬	蚭	蚮	蚯
U+86Bx	蚰	蚱	蚲	蚳	蚴	蚵	蚶	蚷	蚸	蚹	蚺	蚻	蚼	蚽	蚾	蚿
U+86Cx	蛀	蛁	蛂	蛃	蛄	蛅	蛆	蛇	蛈	蛉	蛊	蛋	蛌	蛍	蛎	蛏
U+86Dx	蛐	蛑	蛒	蛓	蛔	蛕	蛖	蛗	蛘	蛙	蛚	蛛	蛜	蛝	蛞	蛟
U+86Ex	蛠	蛡	蛢	蛣	蛤	蛥	蛦	蛧	蛨	蛩	蛪	蛫	蛬	蛭	蛮	蛯
U+86Fx	蛰	蛱	蛲	蛳	蛴	蛵	蛶	蛷	蛸	蛹	蛺	蛻	蛼	蛽	蛾	蛿
U+870x	蜀	蜁	蜂	蜃	蜄	蜅	蜆	蜇	蜈	蜉	蜊	蜋	蜌	蜍	蜎	蜏
U+871x	蜐	蜑	蜒	蜓	蜔	蜕	蜖	蜗	蜘	蜙	蜚	蜛	蜜	蜝	蜞	蜟
U+872x	蜠	蜡	蜢	蜣	蜤	蜥	蜦	蜧	蜨	蜩	蜪	蜫	蜬	蜭	蜮	蜯
U+873x	蜰	蜱	蜲	蜳	蜴	蜵	蜶	蜷	蜸	蜹	蜺	蜻	蜼	蜽	蜾	蜿
U+874x	蝀	蝁	蝂	蝃	蝄	蝅	蝆	蝇	蝈	蝉	蝊	蝋	蝌	蝍	蝎	蝏
U+875x	蝐	蝑	蝒	蝓	蝔	蝕	蝖	蝗	蝘	蝙	蝚	蝛	蝜	蝝	蝞	蝟
U+876x	蝠	蝡	蝢	蝣	蝤	蝥	蝦	蝧	蝨	蝩	蝪	蝫	蝬	蝭	蝮	蝯
U+877x	蝰	蝱	蝲	蝳	蝴	蝵	蝶	蝷	蝸	蝹	蝺	蝻	蝼	蝽	蝾	蝿
U+878x	螀	螁	螂	螃	螄	螅	螆	螇	螈	螉	螊	螋	螌	融	螎	螏
U+879x	螐	螑	螒	螓	螔	螕	螖	螗	螘	螙	螚	螛	螜	螝	螞	螟
U+87Ax	螠	螡	螢	螣	螤	螥	螦	螧	螨	螩	螪	螫	螬	螭	螮	螯
U+87Bx	螰	螱	螲	螳	螴	螵	螶	螷	螸	螹	螺	螻	螼	螽	螾	螿
U+87Cx	蟀	蟁	蟂	蟃	蟄	蟅	蟆	蟇	蟈	蟉	蟊	蟋	蟌	蟍	蟎	蟏
U+87Dx	蟐	蟑	蟒	蟓	蟔	蟕	蟖	蟗	蟘	蟙	蟚	蟛	蟜	蟝	蟞	蟟
U+87Ex	蟠	蟡	蟢	蟣	蟤	蟥	蟦	蟧	蟨	蟩	蟪	蟫	蟬	蟭	蟮	蟯
U+87Fx	蟰	蟱	蟲	蟳	蟴	蟵	蟶	蟷	蟸	蟹	蟺	蟻	蟼	蟽	蟾	蟿
U+880x	蠀	蠁	蠂	蠃	蠄	蠅	蠆	蠇	蠈	蠉	蠊	蠋	蠌	蠍	蠎	蠏
U+881x	蠐	蠑	蠒	蠓	蠔	蠕	蠖	蠗	蠘	蠙	蠚	蠛	蠜	蠝	蠞	蠟
U+882x	蠠	蠡	蠢	蠣	蠤	蠥	蠦	蠧	蠨	蠩	蠪	蠫	蠬	蠭	蠮	蠯
U+883x	蠰	蠱	蠲	蠳	蠴	蠵	蠶	蠷	蠸	蠹	蠺	蠻	蠼	蠽	蠾	蠿
U+884x	血	衁	衂	衃	衄	衅	衆	衇	衈	衉	衊	衋	行	衍	衎	衏
U+885x	衐	衑	衒	術	衔	衕	衖	街	衘	衙	衚	衛	衜	衝	衞	衟
U+886x	衠	衡	衢	衣	衤	补	衦	衧	表	衩	衪	衫	衬	衭	衮	衯
U+887x	衰	衱	衲	衳	衴	衵	衶	衷	衸	衹	衺	衻	衼	衽	衾	衿
U+888x	袀	袁	袂	袃	袄	袅	袆	袇	袈	袉	袊	袋	袌	袍	袎	袏
U+889x	袐	袑	袒	袓	袔	袕	袖	袗	袘	袙	袚	袛	袜	袝	袞	袟
U+88Ax	袠	袡	袢	袣	袤	袥	袦	袧	袨	袩	袪	被	袬	袭	袮	袯
U+88Bx	袰	袱	袲	袳	袴	袵	袶	袷	袸	袹	袺	袻	袼	袽	袾	袿
U+88Cx	裀	裁	裂	裃	裄	装	裆	裇	裈	裉	裊	裋	裌	裍	裎	裏
U+88Dx	裐	裑	裒	裓	裔	裕	裖	裗	裘	裙	裚	裛	補	裝	裞	裟
U+88Ex	裠	裡	裢	裣	裤	裥	裦	裧	裨	裩	裪	裫	裬	裭	裮	裯
U+88Fx	裰	裱	裲	裳	裴	裵	裶	裷	裸	裹	裺	裻	裼	製	裾	裿
U+890x	褀	褁	褂	褃	褄	褅	褆	複	褈	褉	褊	褋	褌	褍	褎	褏
U+891x	褐	褑	褒	褓	褔	褕	褖	褗	褘	褙	褚	褛	褜	褝	褞	褟
U+892x	褠	褡	褢	褣	褤	褥	褦	褧	褨	褩	褪	褫	褬	褭	褮	褯
U+893x	褰	褱	褲	褳	褴	褵	褶	褷	褸	褹	褺	褻	褼	褽	褾	褿
U+894x	襀	襁	襂	襃	襄	襅	襆	襇	襈	襉	襊	襋	襌	襍	襎	襏
U+895x	襐	襑	襒	襓	襔	襕	襖	襗	襘	襙	襚	襛	襜	襝	襞	襟
U+896x	襠	襡	襢	襣	襤	襥	襦	襧	襨	襩	襪	襫	襬	襭	襮	襯
U+897x	襰	襱	襲	襳	襴	襵	襶	襷	襸	襹	襺	襻	襼	襽	襾	西
U+898x	覀	要	覂	覃	覄	覅	覆	覇	覈	覉	覊	見	覌	覍	覎	規
U+899x	覐	覑	覒	覓	覔	覕	視	覗	覘	覙	覚	覛	覜	覝	覞	覟
U+89Ax	覠	覡	覢	覣	覤	覥	覦	覧	覨	覩	親	覫	覬	覭	覮	覯
U+89Bx	覰	覱	覲	観	覴	覵	覶	覷	覸	覹	覺	覻	覼	覽	覾	覿
U+89Cx	觀	见	观	觃	规	觅	视	觇	览	觉	觊	觋	觌	觍	觎	觏
U+89Dx	觐	觑	角	觓	觔	觕	觖	觗	觘	觙	觚	觛	觜	觝	觞	觟
U+89Ex	觠	觡	觢	解	觤	觥	触	觧	觨	觩	觪	觫	觬	觭	觮	觯
U+89Fx	觰	觱	觲	觳	觴	觵	觶	觷	觸	觹	觺	觻	觼	觽	觾	觿
U+8A0x	言	訁	訂	訃	訄	訅	訆	訇	計	訉	訊	訋	訌	訍	討	訏
U+8A1x	訐	訑	訒	訓	訔	訕	訖	託	記	訙	訚	訛	訜	訝	訞	訟
U+8A2x	訠	訡	訢	訣	訤	訥	訦	訧	訨	訩	訪	訫	訬	設	訮	訯
U+8A3x	訰	許	訲	訳	訴	訵	訶	訷	訸	訹	診	註	証	訽	訾	訿
U+8A4x	詀	詁	詂	詃	詄	詅	詆	詇	詈	詉	詊	詋	詌	詍	詎	詏
U+8A5x	詐	詑	詒	詓	詔	評	詖	詗	詘	詙	詚	詛	詜	詝	詞	詟
U+8A6x	詠	詡	詢	詣	詤	詥	試	詧	詨	詩	詪	詫	詬	詭	詮	詯
U+8A7x	詰	話	該	詳	詴	詵	詶	詷	詸	詹	詺	詻	詼	詽	詾	詿
U+8A8x	誀	誁	誂	誃	誄	誅	誆	誇	誈	誉	誊	誋	誌	認	誎	誏
U+8A9x	誐	誑	誒	誓	誔	誕	誖	誗	誘	誙	誚	誛	誜	誝	語	誟
U+8AAx	誠	誡	誢	誣	誤	誥	誦	誧	誨	誩	說	誫	説	読	誮	誯
U+8ABx	誰	誱	課	誳	誴	誵	誶	誷	誸	誹	誺	誻	誼	誽	誾	調
U+8ACx	諀	諁	諂	諃	諄	諅	諆	談	諈	諉	諊	請	諌	諍	諎	諏
U+8ADx	諐	諑	諒	諓	諔	諕	論	諗	諘	諙	諚	諛	諜	諝	諞	諟
U+8AEx	諠	諡	諢	諣	諤	諥	諦	諧	諨	諩	諪	諫	諬	諭	諮	諯
U+8AFx	諰	諱	諲	諳	諴	諵	諶	諷	諸	諹	諺	諻	諼	諽	諾	諿
U+8B0x	謀	謁	謂	謃	謄	謅	謆	謇	謈	謉	謊	謋	謌	謍	謎	謏
U+8B1x	謐	謑	謒	謓	謔	謕	謖	謗	謘	謙	謚	講	謜	謝	謞	謟
U+8B2x	謠	謡	謢	謣	謤	謥	謦	謧	謨	謩	謪	謫	謬	謭	謮	謯
U+8B3x	謰	謱	謲	謳	謴	謵	謶	謷	謸	謹	謺	謻	謼	謽	謾	謿
U+8B4x	譀	譁	譂	譃	譄	譅	譆	譇	譈	證	譊	譋	譌	譍	譎	譏
U+8B5x	譐	譑	譒	譓	譔	譕	譖	譗	識	譙	譚	譛	譜	譝	譞	譟
U+8B6x	譠	譡	譢	譣	譤	譥	警	譧	譨	譩	譪	譫	譬	譭	譮	譯
U+8B7x	議	譱	譲	譳	譴	譵	譶	護	譸	譹	譺	譻	譼	譽	譾	譿
U+8B8x	讀	讁	讂	讃	讄	讅	讆	讇	讈	讉	變	讋	讌	讍	讎	讏
U+8B9x	讐	讑	讒	讓	讔	讕	讖	讗	讘	讙	讚	讛	讜	讝	讞	讟
U+8BAx	讠	计	订	讣	认	讥	讦	讧	讨	让	讪	讫	讬	训	议	讯
U+8BBx	记	讱	讲	讳	讴	讵	讶	讷	许	讹	论	讻	讼	讽	设	访
U+8BCx	诀	证	诂	诃	评	诅	识	诇	诈	诉	诊	诋	诌	词	诎	诏
U+8BDx	诐	译	诒	诓	诔	试	诖	诗	诘	诙	诚	诛	诜	话	诞	诟
U+8BEx	诠	诡	询	诣	诤	该	详	诧	诨	诩	诪	诫	诬	语	诮	误
U+8BFx	诰	诱	诲	诳	说	诵	诶	请	诸	诹	诺	读	诼	诽	课	诿
U+8C0x	谀	谁	谂	调	谄	谅	谆	谇	谈	谉	谊	谋	谌	谍	谎	谏
U+8C1x	谐	谑	谒	谓	谔	谕	谖	谗	谘	谙	谚	谛	谜	谝	谞	谟
U+8C2x	谠	谡	谢	谣	谤	谥	谦	谧	谨	谩	谪	谫	谬	谭	谮	谯
U+8C3x	谰	谱	谲	谳	谴	谵	谶	谷	谸	谹	谺	谻	谼	谽	谾	谿
U+8C4x	豀	豁	豂	豃	豄	豅	豆	豇	豈	豉	豊	豋	豌	豍	豎	豏
U+8C5x	豐	豑	豒	豓	豔	豕	豖	豗	豘	豙	豚	豛	豜	豝	豞	豟
U+8C6x	豠	象	豢	豣	豤	豥	豦	豧	豨	豩	豪	豫	豬	豭	豮	豯
U+8C7x	豰	豱	豲	豳	豴	豵	豶	豷	豸	豹	豺	豻	豼	豽	豾	豿
U+8C8x	貀	貁	貂	貃	貄	貅	貆	貇	貈	貉	貊	貋	貌	貍	貎	貏
U+8C9x	貐	貑	貒	貓	貔	貕	貖	貗	貘	貙	貚	貛	貜	貝	貞	貟
U+8CAx	負	財	貢	貣	貤	貥	貦	貧	貨	販	貪	貫	責	貭	貮	貯
U+8CBx	貰	貱	貲	貳	貴	貵	貶	買	貸	貹	貺	費	貼	貽	貾	貿
U+8CCx	賀	賁	賂	賃	賄	賅	賆	資	賈	賉	賊	賋	賌	賍	賎	賏
U+8CDx	賐	賑	賒	賓	賔	賕	賖	賗	賘	賙	賚	賛	賜	賝	賞	賟
U+8CEx	賠	賡	賢	賣	賤	賥	賦	賧	賨	賩	質	賫	賬	賭	賮	賯
U+8CFx	賰	賱	賲	賳	賴	賵	賶	賷	賸	賹	賺	賻	購	賽	賾	賿
U+8D0x	贀	贁	贂	贃	贄	贅	贆	贇	贈	贉	贊	贋	贌	贍	贎	贏
U+8D1x	贐	贑	贒	贓	贔	贕	贖	贗	贘	贙	贚	贛	贜	贝	贞	负
U+8D2x	贠	贡	财	责	贤	败	账	货	质	贩	贪	贫	贬	购	贮	贯
U+8D3x	贰	贱	贲	贳	贴	贵	贶	贷	贸	费	贺	贻	贼	贽	贾	贿
U+8D4x	赀	赁	赂	赃	资	赅	赆	赇	赈	赉	赊	赋	赌	赍	赎	赏
U+8D5x	赐	赑	赒	赓	赔	赕	赖	赗	赘	赙	赚	赛	赜	赝	赞	赟
U+8D6x	赠	赡	赢	赣	赤	赥	赦	赧	赨	赩	赪	赫	赬	赭	赮	赯
U+8D7x	走	赱	赲	赳	赴	赵	赶	起	赸	赹	赺	赻	赼	赽	赾	赿
U+8D8x	趀	趁	趂	趃	趄	超	趆	趇	趈	趉	越	趋	趌	趍	趎	趏
U+8D9x	趐	趑	趒	趓	趔	趕	趖	趗	趘	趙	趚	趛	趜	趝	趞	趟
U+8DAx	趠	趡	趢	趣	趤	趥	趦	趧	趨	趩	趪	趫	趬	趭	趮	趯
U+8DBx	趰	趱	趲	足	趴	趵	趶	趷	趸	趹	趺	趻	趼	趽	趾	趿
U+8DCx	跀	跁	跂	跃	跄	跅	跆	跇	跈	跉	跊	跋	跌	跍	跎	跏
U+8DDx	跐	跑	跒	跓	跔	跕	跖	跗	跘	跙	跚	跛	跜	距	跞	跟
U+8DEx	跠	跡	跢	跣	跤	跥	跦	跧	跨	跩	跪	跫	跬	跭	跮	路
U+8DFx	跰	跱	跲	跳	跴	践	跶	跷	跸	跹	跺	跻	跼	跽	跾	跿
U+8E0x	踀	踁	踂	踃	踄	踅	踆	踇	踈	踉	踊	踋	踌	踍	踎	踏
U+8E1x	踐	踑	踒	踓	踔	踕	踖	踗	踘	踙	踚	踛	踜	踝	踞	踟
U+8E2x	踠	踡	踢	踣	踤	踥	踦	踧	踨	踩	踪	踫	踬	踭	踮	踯
U+8E3x	踰	踱	踲	踳	踴	踵	踶	踷	踸	踹	踺	踻	踼	踽	踾	踿
U+8E4x	蹀	蹁	蹂	蹃	蹄	蹅	蹆	蹇	蹈	蹉	蹊	蹋	蹌	蹍	蹎	蹏
U+8E5x	蹐	蹑	蹒	蹓	蹔	蹕	蹖	蹗	蹘	蹙	蹚	蹛	蹜	蹝	蹞	蹟
U+8E6x	蹠	蹡	蹢	蹣	蹤	蹥	蹦	蹧	蹨	蹩	蹪	蹫	蹬	蹭	蹮	蹯
U+8E7x	蹰	蹱	蹲	蹳	蹴	蹵	蹶	蹷	蹸	蹹	蹺	蹻	蹼	蹽	蹾	蹿
U+8E8x	躀	躁	躂	躃	躄	躅	躆	躇	躈	躉	躊	躋	躌	躍	躎	躏
U+8E9x	躐	躑	躒	躓	躔	躕	躖	躗	躘	躙	躚	躛	躜	躝	躞	躟
U+8EAx	躠	躡	躢	躣	躤	躥	躦	躧	躨	躩	躪	身	躬	躭	躮	躯
U+8EBx	躰	躱	躲	躳	躴	躵	躶	躷	躸	躹	躺	躻	躼	躽	躾	躿
U+8ECx	軀	軁	軂	軃	軄	軅	軆	軇	軈	軉	車	軋	軌	軍	軎	軏
U+8EDx	軐	軑	軒	軓	軔	軕	軖	軗	軘	軙	軚	軛	軜	軝	軞	軟
U+8EEx	軠	軡	転	軣	軤	軥	軦	軧	軨	軩	軪	軫	軬	軭	軮	軯
U+8EFx	軰	軱	軲	軳	軴	軵	軶	軷	軸	軹	軺	軻	軼	軽	軾	軿
U+8F0x	輀	輁	輂	較	輄	輅	輆	輇	輈	載	輊	輋	輌	輍	輎	輏
U+8F1x	輐	輑	輒	輓	輔	輕	輖	輗	輘	輙	輚	輛	輜	輝	輞	輟
U+8F2x	輠	輡	輢	輣	輤	輥	輦	輧	輨	輩	輪	輫	輬	輭	輮	輯
U+8F3x	輰	輱	輲	輳	輴	輵	輶	輷	輸	輹	輺	輻	輼	輽	輾	輿
U+8F4x	轀	轁	轂	轃	轄	轅	轆	轇	轈	轉	轊	轋	轌	轍	轎	轏
U+8F5x	轐	轑	轒	轓	轔	轕	轖	轗	轘	轙	轚	轛	轜	轝	轞	轟
U+8F6x	轠	轡	轢	轣	轤	轥	车	轧	轨	轩	轪	轫	转	轭	轮	软
U+8F7x	轰	轱	轲	轳	轴	轵	轶	轷	轸	轹	轺	轻	轼	载	轾	轿
U+8F8x	辀	辁	辂	较	辄	辅	辆	辇	辈	辉	辊	辋	辌	辍	辎	辏
U+8F9x	辐	辑	辒	输	辔	辕	辖	辗	辘	辙	辚	辛	辜	辝	辞	辟
U+8FAx	辠	辡	辢	辣	辤	辥	辦	辧	辨	辩	辪	辫	辬	辭	辮	辯
U+8FBx	辰	辱	農	辳	辴	辵	辶	辷	辸	边	辺	辻	込	辽	达	辿
U+8FCx	迀	迁	迂	迃	迄	迅	迆	过	迈	迉	迊	迋	迌	迍	迎	迏
U+8FDx	运	近	迒	迓	返	迕	迖	迗	还	这	迚	进	远	违	连	迟
U+8FEx	迠	迡	迢	迣	迤	迥	迦	迧	迨	迩	迪	迫	迬	迭	迮	迯
U+8FFx	述	迱	迲	迳	迴	迵	迶	迷	迸	迹	迺	迻	迼	追	迾	迿
U+900x	退	送	适	逃	逄	逅	逆	逇	逈	选	逊	逋	逌	逍	逎	透
U+901x	逐	逑	递	逓	途	逕	逖	逗	逘	這	通	逛	逜	逝	逞	速
U+902x	造	逡	逢	連	逤	逥	逦	逧	逨	逩	逪	逫	逬	逭	逮	逯
U+903x	逰	週	進	逳	逴	逵	逶	逷	逸	逹	逺	逻	逼	逽	逾	逿
U+904x	遀	遁	遂	遃	遄	遅	遆	遇	遈	遉	遊	運	遌	遍	過	遏
U+905x	遐	遑	遒	道	達	違	遖	遗	遘	遙	遚	遛	遜	遝	遞	遟
U+906x	遠	遡	遢	遣	遤	遥	遦	遧	遨	適	遪	遫	遬	遭	遮	遯
U+907x	遰	遱	遲	遳	遴	遵	遶	遷	選	遹	遺	遻	遼	遽	遾	避
U+908x	邀	邁	邂	邃	還	邅	邆	邇	邈	邉	邊	邋	邌	邍	邎	邏
U+909x	邐	邑	邒	邓	邔	邕	邖	邗	邘	邙	邚	邛	邜	邝	邞	邟
U+90Ax	邠	邡	邢	那	邤	邥	邦	邧	邨	邩	邪	邫	邬	邭	邮	邯
U+90Bx	邰	邱	邲	邳	邴	邵	邶	邷	邸	邹	邺	邻	邼	邽	邾	邿
U+90Cx	郀	郁	郂	郃	郄	郅	郆	郇	郈	郉	郊	郋	郌	郍	郎	郏
U+90Dx	郐	郑	郒	郓	郔	郕	郖	郗	郘	郙	郚	郛	郜	郝	郞	郟
U+90Ex	郠	郡	郢	郣	郤	郥	郦	郧	部	郩	郪	郫	郬	郭	郮	郯
U+90Fx	郰	郱	郲	郳	郴	郵	郶	郷	郸	郹	郺	郻	郼	都	郾	郿
U+910x	鄀	鄁	鄂	鄃	鄄	鄅	鄆	鄇	鄈	鄉	鄊	鄋	鄌	鄍	鄎	鄏
U+911x	鄐	鄑	鄒	鄓	鄔	鄕	鄖	鄗	鄘	鄙	鄚	鄛	鄜	鄝	鄞	鄟
U+912x	鄠	鄡	鄢	鄣	鄤	鄥	鄦	鄧	鄨	鄩	鄪	鄫	鄬	鄭	鄮	鄯
U+913x	鄰	鄱	鄲	鄳	鄴	鄵	鄶	鄷	鄸	鄹	鄺	鄻	鄼	鄽	鄾	鄿
U+914x	酀	酁	酂	酃	酄	酅	酆	酇	酈	酉	酊	酋	酌	配	酎	酏
U+915x	酐	酑	酒	酓	酔	酕	酖	酗	酘	酙	酚	酛	酜	酝	酞	酟
U+916x	酠	酡	酢	酣	酤	酥	酦	酧	酨	酩	酪	酫	酬	酭	酮	酯
U+917x	酰	酱	酲	酳	酴	酵	酶	酷	酸	酹	酺	酻	酼	酽	酾	酿
U+918x	醀	醁	醂	醃	醄	醅	醆	醇	醈	醉	醊	醋	醌	醍	醎	醏
U+919x	醐	醑	醒	醓	醔	醕	醖	醗	醘	醙	醚	醛	醜	醝	醞	醟
U+91Ax	醠	醡	醢	醣	醤	醥	醦	醧	醨	醩	醪	醫	醬	醭	醮	醯
U+91Bx	醰	醱	醲	醳	醴	醵	醶	醷	醸	醹	醺	醻	醼	醽	醾	醿
U+91Cx	釀	釁	釂	釃	釄	釅	釆	采	釈	釉	释	釋	里	重	野	量
U+91Dx	釐	金	釒	釓	釔	釕	釖	釗	釘	釙	釚	釛	釜	針	釞	釟
U+91Ex	釠	釡	釢	釣	釤	釥	釦	釧	釨	釩	釪	釫	釬	釭	釮	釯
U+91Fx	釰	釱	釲	釳	釴	釵	釶	釷	釸	釹	釺	釻	釼	釽	釾	釿
U+920x	鈀	鈁	鈂	鈃	鈄	鈅	鈆	鈇	鈈	鈉	鈊	鈋	鈌	鈍	鈎	鈏
U+921x	鈐	鈑	鈒	鈓	鈔	鈕	鈖	鈗	鈘	鈙	鈚	鈛	鈜	鈝	鈞	鈟
U+922x	鈠	鈡	鈢	鈣	鈤	鈥	鈦	鈧	鈨	鈩	鈪	鈫	鈬	鈭	鈮	鈯
U+923x	鈰	鈱	鈲	鈳	鈴	鈵	鈶	鈷	鈸	鈹	鈺	鈻	鈼	鈽	鈾	鈿
U+924x	鉀	鉁	鉂	鉃	鉄	鉅	鉆	鉇	鉈	鉉	鉊	鉋	鉌	鉍	鉎	鉏
U+925x	鉐	鉑	鉒	鉓	鉔	鉕	鉖	鉗	鉘	鉙	鉚	鉛	鉜	鉝	鉞	鉟
U+926x	鉠	鉡	鉢	鉣	鉤	鉥	鉦	鉧	鉨	鉩	鉪	鉫	鉬	鉭	鉮	鉯
U+927x	鉰	鉱	鉲	鉳	鉴	鉵	鉶	鉷	鉸	鉹	鉺	鉻	鉼	鉽	鉾	鉿
U+928x	銀	銁	銂	銃	銄	銅	銆	銇	銈	銉	銊	銋	銌	銍	銎	銏
U+929x	銐	銑	銒	銓	銔	銕	銖	銗	銘	銙	銚	銛	銜	銝	銞	銟
U+92Ax	銠	銡	銢	銣	銤	銥	銦	銧	銨	銩	銪	銫	銬	銭	銮	銯
U+92Bx	銰	銱	銲	銳	銴	銵	銶	銷	銸	銹	銺	銻	銼	銽	銾	銿
U+92Cx	鋀	鋁	鋂	鋃	鋄	鋅	鋆	鋇	鋈	鋉	鋊	鋋	鋌	鋍	鋎	鋏
U+92Dx	鋐	鋑	鋒	鋓	鋔	鋕	鋖	鋗	鋘	鋙	鋚	鋛	鋜	鋝	鋞	鋟
U+92Ex	鋠	鋡	鋢	鋣	鋤	鋥	鋦	鋧	鋨	鋩	鋪	鋫	鋬	鋭	鋮	鋯
U+92Fx	鋰	鋱	鋲	鋳	鋴	鋵	鋶	鋷	鋸	鋹	鋺	鋻	鋼	鋽	鋾	鋿
U+930x	錀	錁	錂	錃	錄	錅	錆	錇	錈	錉	錊	錋	錌	錍	錎	錏
U+931x	錐	錑	錒	錓	錔	錕	錖	錗	錘	錙	錚	錛	錜	錝	錞	錟
U+932x	錠	錡	錢	錣	錤	錥	錦	錧	錨	錩	錪	錫	錬	錭	錮	錯
U+933x	錰	錱	録	錳	錴	錵	錶	錷	錸	錹	錺	錻	錼	錽	錾	錿
U+934x	鍀	鍁	鍂	鍃	鍄	鍅	鍆	鍇	鍈	鍉	鍊	鍋	鍌	鍍	鍎	鍏
U+935x	鍐	鍑	鍒	鍓	鍔	鍕	鍖	鍗	鍘	鍙	鍚	鍛	鍜	鍝	鍞	鍟
U+936x	鍠	鍡	鍢	鍣	鍤	鍥	鍦	鍧	鍨	鍩	鍪	鍫	鍬	鍭	鍮	鍯
U+937x	鍰	鍱	鍲	鍳	鍴	鍵	鍶	鍷	鍸	鍹	鍺	鍻	鍼	鍽	鍾	鍿
U+938x	鎀	鎁	鎂	鎃	鎄	鎅	鎆	鎇	鎈	鎉	鎊	鎋	鎌	鎍	鎎	鎏
U+939x	鎐	鎑	鎒	鎓	鎔	鎕	鎖	鎗	鎘	鎙	鎚	鎛	鎜	鎝	鎞	鎟
U+93Ax	鎠	鎡	鎢	鎣	鎤	鎥	鎦	鎧	鎨	鎩	鎪	鎫	鎬	鎭	鎮	鎯
U+93Bx	鎰	鎱	鎲	鎳	鎴	鎵	鎶	鎷	鎸	鎹	鎺	鎻	鎼	鎽	鎾	鎿
U+93Cx	鏀	鏁	鏂	鏃	鏄	鏅	鏆	鏇	鏈	鏉	鏊	鏋	鏌	鏍	鏎	鏏
U+93Dx	鏐	鏑	鏒	鏓	鏔	鏕	鏖	鏗	鏘	鏙	鏚	鏛	鏜	鏝	鏞	鏟
U+93Ex	鏠	鏡	鏢	鏣	鏤	鏥	鏦	鏧	鏨	鏩	鏪	鏫	鏬	鏭	鏮	鏯
U+93Fx	鏰	鏱	鏲	鏳	鏴	鏵	鏶	鏷	鏸	鏹	鏺	鏻	鏼	鏽	鏾	鏿
U+940x	鐀	鐁	鐂	鐃	鐄	鐅	鐆	鐇	鐈	鐉	鐊	鐋	鐌	鐍	鐎	鐏
U+941x	鐐	鐑	鐒	鐓	鐔	鐕	鐖	鐗	鐘	鐙	鐚	鐛	鐜	鐝	鐞	鐟
U+942x	鐠	鐡	鐢	鐣	鐤	鐥	鐦	鐧	鐨	鐩	鐪	鐫	鐬	鐭	鐮	鐯
U+943x	鐰	鐱	鐲	鐳	鐴	鐵	鐶	鐷	鐸	鐹	鐺	鐻	鐼	鐽	鐾	鐿
U+944x	鑀	鑁	鑂	鑃	鑄	鑅	鑆	鑇	鑈	鑉	鑊	鑋	鑌	鑍	鑎	鑏
U+945x	鑐	鑑	鑒	鑓	鑔	鑕	鑖	鑗	鑘	鑙	鑚	鑛	鑜	鑝	鑞	鑟
U+946x	鑠	鑡	鑢	鑣	鑤	鑥	鑦	鑧	鑨	鑩	鑪	鑫	鑬	鑭	鑮	鑯
U+947x	鑰	鑱	鑲	鑳	鑴	鑵	鑶	鑷	鑸	鑹	鑺	鑻	鑼	鑽	鑾	鑿
U+948x	钀	钁	钂	钃	钄	钅	钆	钇	针	钉	钊	钋	钌	钍	钎	钏
U+949x	钐	钑	钒	钓	钔	钕	钖	钗	钘	钙	钚	钛	钜	钝	钞	钟
U+94Ax	钠	钡	钢	钣	钤	钥	钦	钧	钨	钩	钪	钫	钬	钭	钮	钯
U+94Bx	钰	钱	钲	钳	钴	钵	钶	钷	钸	钹	钺	钻	钼	钽	钾	钿
U+94Cx	铀	铁	铂	铃	铄	铅	铆	铇	铈	铉	铊	铋	铌	铍	铎	铏
U+94Dx	铐	铑	铒	铓	铔	铕	铖	铗	铘	铙	铚	铛	铜	铝	铞	铟
U+94Ex	铠	铡	铢	铣	铤	铥	铦	铧	铨	铩	铪	铫	铬	铭	铮	铯
U+94Fx	铰	铱	铲	铳	铴	铵	银	铷	铸	铹	铺	铻	铼	铽	链	铿
U+950x	销	锁	锂	锃	锄	锅	锆	锇	锈	锉	锊	锋	锌	锍	锎	锏
U+951x	锐	锑	锒	锓	锔	锕	锖	锗	锘	错	锚	锛	锜	锝	锞	锟
U+952x	锠	锡	锢	锣	锤	锥	锦	锧	锨	锩	锪	锫	锬	锭	键	锯
U+953x	锰	锱	锲	锳	锴	锵	锶	锷	锸	锹	锺	锻	锼	锽	锾	锿
U+954x	镀	镁	镂	镃	镄	镅	镆	镇	镈	镉	镊	镋	镌	镍	镎	镏
U+955x	镐	镑	镒	镓	镔	镕	镖	镗	镘	镙	镚	镛	镜	镝	镞	镟
U+956x	镠	镡	镢	镣	镤	镥	镦	镧	镨	镩	镪	镫	镬	镭	镮	镯
U+957x	镰	镱	镲	镳	镴	镵	镶	長	镸	镹	镺	镻	镼	镽	镾	长
U+958x	門	閁	閂	閃	閄	閅	閆	閇	閈	閉	閊	開	閌	閍	閎	閏
U+959x	閐	閑	閒	間	閔	閕	閖	閗	閘	閙	閚	閛	閜	閝	閞	閟
U+95Ax	閠	閡	関	閣	閤	閥	閦	閧	閨	閩	閪	閫	閬	閭	閮	閯
U+95Bx	閰	閱	閲	閳	閴	閵	閶	閷	閸	閹	閺	閻	閼	閽	閾	閿
U+95Cx	闀	闁	闂	闃	闄	闅	闆	闇	闈	闉	闊	闋	闌	闍	闎	闏
U+95Dx	闐	闑	闒	闓	闔	闕	闖	闗	闘	闙	闚	闛	關	闝	闞	闟
U+95Ex	闠	闡	闢	闣	闤	闥	闦	闧	门	闩	闪	闫	闬	闭	问	闯
U+95Fx	闰	闱	闲	闳	间	闵	闶	闷	闸	闹	闺	闻	闼	闽	闾	闿
U+960x	阀	阁	阂	阃	阄	阅	阆	阇	阈	阉	阊	阋	阌	阍	阎	阏
U+961x	阐	阑	阒	阓	阔	阕	阖	阗	阘	阙	阚	阛	阜	阝	阞	队
U+962x	阠	阡	阢	阣	阤	阥	阦	阧	阨	阩	阪	阫	阬	阭	阮	阯
U+963x	阰	阱	防	阳	阴	阵	阶	阷	阸	阹	阺	阻	阼	阽	阾	阿
U+964x	陀	陁	陂	陃	附	际	陆	陇	陈	陉	陊	陋	陌	降	陎	陏
U+965x	限	陑	陒	陓	陔	陕	陖	陗	陘	陙	陚	陛	陜	陝	陞	陟
U+966x	陠	陡	院	陣	除	陥	陦	陧	陨	险	陪	陫	陬	陭	陮	陯
U+967x	陰	陱	陲	陳	陴	陵	陶	陷	陸	陹	険	陻	陼	陽	陾	陿
U+968x	隀	隁	隂	隃	隄	隅	隆	隇	隈	隉	隊	隋	隌	隍	階	随
U+969x	隐	隑	隒	隓	隔	隕	隖	隗	隘	隙	隚	際	障	隝	隞	隟
U+96Ax	隠	隡	隢	隣	隤	隥	隦	隧	隨	隩	險	隫	隬	隭	隮	隯
U+96Bx	隰	隱	隲	隳	隴	隵	隶	隷	隸	隹	隺	隻	隼	隽	难	隿
U+96Cx	雀	雁	雂	雃	雄	雅	集	雇	雈	雉	雊	雋	雌	雍	雎	雏
U+96Dx	雐	雑	雒	雓	雔	雕	雖	雗	雘	雙	雚	雛	雜	雝	雞	雟
U+96Ex	雠	雡	離	難	雤	雥	雦	雧	雨	雩	雪	雫	雬	雭	雮	雯
U+96Fx	雰	雱	雲	雳	雴	雵	零	雷	雸	雹	雺	電	雼	雽	雾	雿
U+970x	需	霁	霂	霃	霄	霅	霆	震	霈	霉	霊	霋	霌	霍	霎	霏
U+971x	霐	霑	霒	霓	霔	霕	霖	霗	霘	霙	霚	霛	霜	霝	霞	霟
U+972x	霠	霡	霢	霣	霤	霥	霦	霧	霨	霩	霪	霫	霬	霭	霮	霯
U+973x	霰	霱	露	霳	霴	霵	霶	霷	霸	霹	霺	霻	霼	霽	霾	霿
U+974x	靀	靁	靂	靃	靄	靅	靆	靇	靈	靉	靊	靋	靌	靍	靎	靏
U+975x	靐	靑	青	靓	靔	靕	靖	靗	靘	静	靚	靛	靜	靝	非	靟
U+976x	靠	靡	面	靣	靤	靥	靦	靧	靨	革	靪	靫	靬	靭	靮	靯
U+977x	靰	靱	靲	靳	靴	靵	靶	靷	靸	靹	靺	靻	靼	靽	靾	靿
U+978x	鞀	鞁	鞂	鞃	鞄	鞅	鞆	鞇	鞈	鞉	鞊	鞋	鞌	鞍	鞎	鞏
U+979x	鞐	鞑	鞒	鞓	鞔	鞕	鞖	鞗	鞘	鞙	鞚	鞛	鞜	鞝	鞞	鞟
U+97Ax	鞠	鞡	鞢	鞣	鞤	鞥	鞦	鞧	鞨	鞩	鞪	鞫	鞬	鞭	鞮	鞯
U+97Bx	鞰	鞱	鞲	鞳	鞴	鞵	鞶	鞷	鞸	鞹	鞺	鞻	鞼	鞽	鞾	鞿
U+97Cx	韀	韁	韂	韃	韄	韅	韆	韇	韈	韉	韊	韋	韌	韍	韎	韏
U+97Dx	韐	韑	韒	韓	韔	韕	韖	韗	韘	韙	韚	韛	韜	韝	韞	韟
U+97Ex	韠	韡	韢	韣	韤	韥	韦	韧	韨	韩	韪	韫	韬	韭	韮	韯
U+97Fx	韰	韱	韲	音	韴	韵	韶	韷	韸	韹	韺	韻	韼	韽	韾	響
U+980x	頀	頁	頂	頃	頄	項	順	頇	須	頉	頊	頋	頌	頍	頎	頏
U+981x	預	頑	頒	頓	頔	頕	頖	頗	領	頙	頚	頛	頜	頝	頞	頟
U+982x	頠	頡	頢	頣	頤	頥	頦	頧	頨	頩	頪	頫	頬	頭	頮	頯
U+983x	頰	頱	頲	頳	頴	頵	頶	頷	頸	頹	頺	頻	頼	頽	頾	頿
U+984x	顀	顁	顂	顃	顄	顅	顆	顇	顈	顉	顊	顋	題	額	顎	顏
U+985x	顐	顑	顒	顓	顔	顕	顖	顗	願	顙	顚	顛	顜	顝	類	顟
U+986x	顠	顡	顢	顣	顤	顥	顦	顧	顨	顩	顪	顫	顬	顭	顮	顯
U+987x	顰	顱	顲	顳	顴	页	顶	顷	顸	项	顺	须	顼	顽	顾	顿
U+988x	颀	颁	颂	颃	预	颅	领	颇	颈	颉	颊	颋	颌	颍	颎	颏
U+989x	颐	频	颒	颓	颔	颕	颖	颗	题	颙	颚	颛	颜	额	颞	颟
U+98Ax	颠	颡	颢	颣	颤	颥	颦	颧	風	颩	颪	颫	颬	颭	颮	颯
U+98Bx	颰	颱	颲	颳	颴	颵	颶	颷	颸	颹	颺	颻	颼	颽	颾	颿
U+98Cx	飀	飁	飂	飃	飄	飅	飆	飇	飈	飉	飊	飋	飌	飍	风	飏
U+98Dx	飐	飑	飒	飓	飔	飕	飖	飗	飘	飙	飚	飛	飜	飝	飞	食
U+98Ex	飠	飡	飢	飣	飤	飥	飦	飧	飨	飩	飪	飫	飬	飭	飮	飯
U+98Fx	飰	飱	飲	飳	飴	飵	飶	飷	飸	飹	飺	飻	飼	飽	飾	飿
U+990x	餀	餁	餂	餃	餄	餅	餆	餇	餈	餉	養	餋	餌	餍	餎	餏
U+991x	餐	餑	餒	餓	餔	餕	餖	餗	餘	餙	餚	餛	餜	餝	餞	餟
U+992x	餠	餡	餢	餣	餤	餥	餦	餧	館	餩	餪	餫	餬	餭	餮	餯
U+993x	餰	餱	餲	餳	餴	餵	餶	餷	餸	餹	餺	餻	餼	餽	餾	餿
U+994x	饀	饁	饂	饃	饄	饅	饆	饇	饈	饉	饊	饋	饌	饍	饎	饏
U+995x	饐	饑	饒	饓	饔	饕	饖	饗	饘	饙	饚	饛	饜	饝	饞	饟
U+996x	饠	饡	饢	饣	饤	饥	饦	饧	饨	饩	饪	饫	饬	饭	饮	饯
U+997x	饰	饱	饲	饳	饴	饵	饶	饷	饸	饹	饺	饻	饼	饽	饾	饿
U+998x	馀	馁	馂	馃	馄	馅	馆	馇	馈	馉	馊	馋	馌	馍	馎	馏
U+999x	馐	馑	馒	馓	馔	馕	首	馗	馘	香	馚	馛	馜	馝	馞	馟
U+99Ax	馠	馡	馢	馣	馤	馥	馦	馧	馨	馩	馪	馫	馬	馭	馮	馯
U+99Bx	馰	馱	馲	馳	馴	馵	馶	馷	馸	馹	馺	馻	馼	馽	馾	馿
U+99Cx	駀	駁	駂	駃	駄	駅	駆	駇	駈	駉	駊	駋	駌	駍	駎	駏
U+99Dx	駐	駑	駒	駓	駔	駕	駖	駗	駘	駙	駚	駛	駜	駝	駞	駟
U+99Ex	駠	駡	駢	駣	駤	駥	駦	駧	駨	駩	駪	駫	駬	駭	駮	駯
U+99Fx	駰	駱	駲	駳	駴	駵	駶	駷	駸	駹	駺	駻	駼	駽	駾	駿
U+9A0x	騀	騁	騂	騃	騄	騅	騆	騇	騈	騉	騊	騋	騌	騍	騎	騏
U+9A1x	騐	騑	騒	験	騔	騕	騖	騗	騘	騙	騚	騛	騜	騝	騞	騟
U+9A2x	騠	騡	騢	騣	騤	騥	騦	騧	騨	騩	騪	騫	騬	騭	騮	騯
U+9A3x	騰	騱	騲	騳	騴	騵	騶	騷	騸	騹	騺	騻	騼	騽	騾	騿
U+9A4x	驀	驁	驂	驃	驄	驅	驆	驇	驈	驉	驊	驋	驌	驍	驎	驏
U+9A5x	驐	驑	驒	驓	驔	驕	驖	驗	驘	驙	驚	驛	驜	驝	驞	驟
U+9A6x	驠	驡	驢	驣	驤	驥	驦	驧	驨	驩	驪	驫	马	驭	驮	驯
U+9A7x	驰	驱	驲	驳	驴	驵	驶	驷	驸	驹	驺	驻	驼	驽	驾	驿
U+9A8x	骀	骁	骂	骃	骄	骅	骆	骇	骈	骉	骊	骋	验	骍	骎	骏
U+9A9x	骐	骑	骒	骓	骔	骕	骖	骗	骘	骙	骚	骛	骜	骝	骞	骟
U+9AAx	骠	骡	骢	骣	骤	骥	骦	骧	骨	骩	骪	骫	骬	骭	骮	骯
U+9ABx	骰	骱	骲	骳	骴	骵	骶	骷	骸	骹	骺	骻	骼	骽	骾	骿
U+9ACx	髀	髁	髂	髃	髄	髅	髆	髇	髈	髉	髊	髋	髌	髍	髎	髏
U+9ADx	髐	髑	髒	髓	體	髕	髖	髗	高	髙	髚	髛	髜	髝	髞	髟
U+9AEx	髠	髡	髢	髣	髤	髥	髦	髧	髨	髩	髪	髫	髬	髭	髮	髯
U+9AFx	髰	髱	髲	髳	髴	髵	髶	髷	髸	髹	髺	髻	髼	髽	髾	髿
U+9B0x	鬀	鬁	鬂	鬃	鬄	鬅	鬆	鬇	鬈	鬉	鬊	鬋	鬌	鬍	鬎	鬏
U+9B1x	鬐	鬑	鬒	鬓	鬔	鬕	鬖	鬗	鬘	鬙	鬚	鬛	鬜	鬝	鬞	鬟
U+9B2x	鬠	鬡	鬢	鬣	鬤	鬥	鬦	鬧	鬨	鬩	鬪	鬫	鬬	鬭	鬮	鬯
U+9B3x	鬰	鬱	鬲	鬳	鬴	鬵	鬶	鬷	鬸	鬹	鬺	鬻	鬼	鬽	鬾	鬿
U+9B4x	魀	魁	魂	魃	魄	魅	魆	魇	魈	魉	魊	魋	魌	魍	魎	魏
U+9B5x	魐	魑	魒	魓	魔	魕	魖	魗	魘	魙	魚	魛	魜	魝	魞	魟
U+9B6x	魠	魡	魢	魣	魤	魥	魦	魧	魨	魩	魪	魫	魬	魭	魮	魯
U+9B7x	魰	魱	魲	魳	魴	魵	魶	魷	魸	魹	魺	魻	魼	魽	魾	魿
U+9B8x	鮀	鮁	鮂	鮃	鮄	鮅	鮆	鮇	鮈	鮉	鮊	鮋	鮌	鮍	鮎	鮏
U+9B9x	鮐	鮑	鮒	鮓	鮔	鮕	鮖	鮗	鮘	鮙	鮚	鮛	鮜	鮝	鮞	鮟
U+9BAx	鮠	鮡	鮢	鮣	鮤	鮥	鮦	鮧	鮨	鮩	鮪	鮫	鮬	鮭	鮮	鮯
U+9BBx	鮰	鮱	鮲	鮳	鮴	鮵	鮶	鮷	鮸	鮹	鮺	鮻	鮼	鮽	鮾	鮿
U+9BCx	鯀	鯁	鯂	鯃	鯄	鯅	鯆	鯇	鯈	鯉	鯊	鯋	鯌	鯍	鯎	鯏
U+9BDx	鯐	鯑	鯒	鯓	鯔	鯕	鯖	鯗	鯘	鯙	鯚	鯛	鯜	鯝	鯞	鯟
U+9BEx	鯠	鯡	鯢	鯣	鯤	鯥	鯦	鯧	鯨	鯩	鯪	鯫	鯬	鯭	鯮	鯯
U+9BFx	鯰	鯱	鯲	鯳	鯴	鯵	鯶	鯷	鯸	鯹	鯺	鯻	鯼	鯽	鯾	鯿
U+9C0x	鰀	鰁	鰂	鰃	鰄	鰅	鰆	鰇	鰈	鰉	鰊	鰋	鰌	鰍	鰎	鰏
U+9C1x	鰐	鰑	鰒	鰓	鰔	鰕	鰖	鰗	鰘	鰙	鰚	鰛	鰜	鰝	鰞	鰟
U+9C2x	鰠	鰡	鰢	鰣	鰤	鰥	鰦	鰧	鰨	鰩	鰪	鰫	鰬	鰭	鰮	鰯
U+9C3x	鰰	鰱	鰲	鰳	鰴	鰵	鰶	鰷	鰸	鰹	鰺	鰻	鰼	鰽	鰾	鰿
U+9C4x	鱀	鱁	鱂	鱃	鱄	鱅	鱆	鱇	鱈	鱉	鱊	鱋	鱌	鱍	鱎	鱏
U+9C5x	鱐	鱑	鱒	鱓	鱔	鱕	鱖	鱗	鱘	鱙	鱚	鱛	鱜	鱝	鱞	鱟
U+9C6x	鱠	鱡	鱢	鱣	鱤	鱥	鱦	鱧	鱨	鱩	鱪	鱫	鱬	鱭	鱮	鱯
U+9C7x	鱰	鱱	鱲	鱳	鱴	鱵	鱶	鱷	鱸	鱹	鱺	鱻	鱼	鱽	鱾	鱿
U+9C8x	鲀	鲁	鲂	鲃	鲄	鲅	鲆	鲇	鲈	鲉	鲊	鲋	鲌	鲍	鲎	鲏
U+9C9x	鲐	鲑	鲒	鲓	鲔	鲕	鲖	鲗	鲘	鲙	鲚	鲛	鲜	鲝	鲞	鲟
U+9CAx	鲠	鲡	鲢	鲣	鲤	鲥	鲦	鲧	鲨	鲩	鲪	鲫	鲬	鲭	鲮	鲯
U+9CBx	鲰	鲱	鲲	鲳	鲴	鲵	鲶	鲷	鲸	鲹	鲺	鲻	鲼	鲽	鲾	鲿
U+9CCx	鳀	鳁	鳂	鳃	鳄	鳅	鳆	鳇	鳈	鳉	鳊	鳋	鳌	鳍	鳎	鳏
U+9CDx	鳐	鳑	鳒	鳓	鳔	鳕	鳖	鳗	鳘	鳙	鳚	鳛	鳜	鳝	鳞	鳟
U+9CEx	鳠	鳡	鳢	鳣	鳤	鳥	鳦	鳧	鳨	鳩	鳪	鳫	鳬	鳭	鳮	鳯
U+9CFx	鳰	鳱	鳲	鳳	鳴	鳵	鳶	鳷	鳸	鳹	鳺	鳻	鳼	鳽	鳾	鳿
U+9D0x	鴀	鴁	鴂	鴃	鴄	鴅	鴆	鴇	鴈	鴉	鴊	鴋	鴌	鴍	鴎	鴏
U+9D1x	鴐	鴑	鴒	鴓	鴔	鴕	鴖	鴗	鴘	鴙	鴚	鴛	鴜	鴝	鴞	鴟
U+9D2x	鴠	鴡	鴢	鴣	鴤	鴥	鴦	鴧	鴨	鴩	鴪	鴫	鴬	鴭	鴮	鴯
U+9D3x	鴰	鴱	鴲	鴳	鴴	鴵	鴶	鴷	鴸	鴹	鴺	鴻	鴼	鴽	鴾	鴿
U+9D4x	鵀	鵁	鵂	鵃	鵄	鵅	鵆	鵇	鵈	鵉	鵊	鵋	鵌	鵍	鵎	鵏
U+9D5x	鵐	鵑	鵒	鵓	鵔	鵕	鵖	鵗	鵘	鵙	鵚	鵛	鵜	鵝	鵞	鵟
U+9D6x	鵠	鵡	鵢	鵣	鵤	鵥	鵦	鵧	鵨	鵩	鵪	鵫	鵬	鵭	鵮	鵯
U+9D7x	鵰	鵱	鵲	鵳	鵴	鵵	鵶	鵷	鵸	鵹	鵺	鵻	鵼	鵽	鵾	鵿
U+9D8x	鶀	鶁	鶂	鶃	鶄	鶅	鶆	鶇	鶈	鶉	鶊	鶋	鶌	鶍	鶎	鶏
U+9D9x	鶐	鶑	鶒	鶓	鶔	鶕	鶖	鶗	鶘	鶙	鶚	鶛	鶜	鶝	鶞	鶟
U+9DAx	鶠	鶡	鶢	鶣	鶤	鶥	鶦	鶧	鶨	鶩	鶪	鶫	鶬	鶭	鶮	鶯
U+9DBx	鶰	鶱	鶲	鶳	鶴	鶵	鶶	鶷	鶸	鶹	鶺	鶻	鶼	鶽	鶾	鶿
U+9DCx	鷀	鷁	鷂	鷃	鷄	鷅	鷆	鷇	鷈	鷉	鷊	鷋	鷌	鷍	鷎	鷏
U+9DDx	鷐	鷑	鷒	鷓	鷔	鷕	鷖	鷗	鷘	鷙	鷚	鷛	鷜	鷝	鷞	鷟
U+9DEx	鷠	鷡	鷢	鷣	鷤	鷥	鷦	鷧	鷨	鷩	鷪	鷫	鷬	鷭	鷮	鷯
U+9DFx	鷰	鷱	鷲	鷳	鷴	鷵	鷶	鷷	鷸	鷹	鷺	鷻	鷼	鷽	鷾	鷿
U+9E0x	鸀	鸁	鸂	鸃	鸄	鸅	鸆	鸇	鸈	鸉	鸊	鸋	鸌	鸍	鸎	鸏
U+9E1x	鸐	鸑	鸒	鸓	鸔	鸕	鸖	鸗	鸘	鸙	鸚	鸛	鸜	鸝	鸞	鸟
U+9E2x	鸠	鸡	鸢	鸣	鸤	鸥	鸦	鸧	鸨	鸩	鸪	鸫	鸬	鸭	鸮	鸯
U+9E3x	鸰	鸱	鸲	鸳	鸴	鸵	鸶	鸷	鸸	鸹	鸺	鸻	鸼	鸽	鸾	鸿
U+9E4x	鹀	鹁	鹂	鹃	鹄	鹅	鹆	鹇	鹈	鹉	鹊	鹋	鹌	鹍	鹎	鹏
U+9E5x	鹐	鹑	鹒	鹓	鹔	鹕	鹖	鹗	鹘	鹙	鹚	鹛	鹜	鹝	鹞	鹟
U+9E6x	鹠	鹡	鹢	鹣	鹤	鹥	鹦	鹧	鹨	鹩	鹪	鹫	鹬	鹭	鹮	鹯
U+9E7x	鹰	鹱	鹲	鹳	鹴	鹵	鹶	鹷	鹸	鹹	鹺	鹻	鹼	鹽	鹾	鹿
U+9E8x	麀	麁	麂	麃	麄	麅	麆	麇	麈	麉	麊	麋	麌	麍	麎	麏
U+9E9x	麐	麑	麒	麓	麔	麕	麖	麗	麘	麙	麚	麛	麜	麝	麞	麟
U+9EAx	麠	麡	麢	麣	麤	麥	麦	麧	麨	麩	麪	麫	麬	麭	麮	麯
U+9EBx	麰	麱	麲	麳	麴	麵	麶	麷	麸	麹	麺	麻	麼	麽	麾	麿
U+9ECx	黀	黁	黂	黃	黄	黅	黆	黇	黈	黉	黊	黋	黌	黍	黎	黏
U+9EDx	黐	黑	黒	黓	黔	黕	黖	黗	默	黙	黚	黛	黜	黝	點	黟
U+9EEx	黠	黡	黢	黣	黤	黥	黦	黧	黨	黩	黪	黫	黬	黭	黮	黯
U+9EFx	黰	黱	黲	黳	黴	黵	黶	黷	黸	黹	黺	黻	黼	黽	黾	黿
U+9F0x	鼀	鼁	鼂	鼃	鼄	鼅	鼆	鼇	鼈	鼉	鼊	鼋	鼌	鼍	鼎	鼏
U+9F1x	鼐	鼑	鼒	鼓	鼔	鼕	鼖	鼗	鼘	鼙	鼚	鼛	鼜	鼝	鼞	鼟
U+9F2x	鼠	鼡	鼢	鼣	鼤	鼥	鼦	鼧	鼨	鼩	鼪	鼫	鼬	鼭	鼮	鼯
U+9F3x	鼰	鼱	鼲	鼳	鼴	鼵	鼶	鼷	鼸	鼹	鼺	鼻	鼼	鼽	鼾	鼿
U+9F4x	齀	齁	齂	齃	齄	齅	齆	齇	齈	齉	齊	齋	齌	齍	齎	齏
U+9F5x	齐	齑	齒	齓	齔	齕	齖	齗	齘	齙	齚	齛	齜	齝	齞	齟
U+9F6x	齠	齡	齢	齣	齤	齥	齦	齧	齨	齩	齪	齫	齬	齭	齮	齯
U+9F7x	齰	齱	齲	齳	齴	齵	齶	齷	齸	齹	齺	齻	齼	齽	齾	齿
U+9F8x	龀	龁	龂	龃	龄	龅	龆	龇	龈	龉	龊	龋	龌	龍	龎	龏
U+9F9x	龐	龑	龒	龓	龔	龕	龖	龗	龘	龙	龚	龛	龜	龝	龞	龟
U+9FAx	龠	龡	龢	龣	龤	龥	龦	龧	龨	龩	龪	龫	龬	龭	龮	龯
U+9FBx	龰	龱	龲	龳	龴	龵	龶	龷	龸	龹	龺	龻	龼	龽	龾	龿
U+9FCx	鿀	鿁	鿂	鿃	鿄	鿅	鿆	鿇	鿈	鿉	鿊	鿋	鿌	鿍	鿎	鿏
U+9FDx	鿐	鿑	鿒	鿓	鿔	鿕	鿖	鿗	鿘	鿙	鿚	鿛	鿜	鿝	鿞	鿟
U+9FEx	鿠	鿡	鿢	鿣	鿤	鿥	鿦	鿧	鿨	鿩	鿪	鿫	鿬	鿭	鿮	鿯
U+9FFx	鿰	鿱	鿲	鿳	鿴	鿵	鿶	鿷	鿸	鿹	鿺	鿻	鿼	鿽	鿾	鿿
Notes 1.As of Unicode version 18.0

== History ==
The following Unicode-related documents record the purpose and process of defining specific characters in the CJK Unified Ideographs block:

Version	Final code points (Note: Proposed code points and characters names may differ from final code points and names)	Count	UTC ID	L2 ID	WG2 ID	IRG ID	Document
1.0.1	U+4E00..9FA5	20,902		X3L2/89-153	N480		Proposal for Creating Unified CJK Han Char Collection, 1989-07-01
1.0.1	U+4E00..9FA5	20,902		X3L2/89-162	N492		Memo on Unified Han Character Collection, August 1989
1.0.1	U+4E00..9FA5	20,902		X3L2/89-163	N493		Are Japanese Ideographs Different from Chinese & Korean?, August 1989
1.0.1	U+4E00..9FA5	20,902		X3L2/90-019I	N507		Coding of ideographic characters in ISO 10646, 1989-09-11
1.0.1	U+4E00..9FA5	20,902		X3L2/90-019C			Further Explanations on HCC (as previously described in 2 N 2046), 1989-11-13
1.0.1	U+4E00..9FA5	20,902		X3L2/90-019D			Chinese National Position on HCC, 1989-11-13
1.0.1	U+4E00..9FA5	20,902		X3L2/90-019F	N508		Proposed Rules for Handling the Differences of Similar Hanza/Hanja/Kanji, 1989-11-13
1.0.1	U+4E00..9FA5	20,902		X3L2/90-056A			Wada, Eiiti (1990-01-30), Letter from Prof. Wada re Han Character Collection
1.0.1	U+4E00..9FA5	20,902		X3L2/90-019F.1	N508R		Proposed Rules for Handling the Differences of Hanza/Hanja/Kanji Similar in Shape
1.0.1	U+4E00..9FA5	20,902		X3L2/90-023			Hastings, Tom (1990-02-08), Naming Ideographic Characters in ISO DP 10646
1.0.1	U+4E00..9FA5	20,902		X3L2/90-061D	N612		Hasegawa, Masami (1990-03-01), Possible solutions to the CJK ideographic character problem
1.0.1	U+4E00..9FA5	20,902		X3L2/90-060A	N600		Detail Report of the ad hoc (Seoul) meeting of WG2, 1990-03-02
1.0.1	U+4E00..9FA5	20,902		X3L2/90-132	N647		Arrangement of Characters from China in DIS 10646, 1990-09-07
1.0.1	U+4E00..9FA5	20,902		X3L2/90-124	N667		"7. Review feedback on conclusions reached at meeting 17 in Sapporo", Minutes of SC2/WG2 Meeting 18 in Munich, 1990-11-12
1.0.1	U+4E00..9FA5	20,902		X3L2/91-001			Smith-Yoshimura, Karen (1991-01-02), RLG Position Paper on Han Unification
1.0.1	U+4E00..9FA5	20,902		X3L2/91-016			Comments on ISO-IEC JTC1/SC2/WG2 N669, 1991-01-16
1.0.1	U+4E00..9FA5	20,902		X3L2/91-017			Outline Position Han Unification (Draft), 1991-01-16
1.0.1	U+4E00..9FA5	20,902		X3L2/91-045			Collins, Lee (1991-03-12), Unified Han Character Set in ISO/IEC DIS 10646
1.0.1	U+4E00..9FA5	20,902	UTC/1991-055				Collins, Lee, Disposition of CJK Issues
1.0.1	U+4E00..9FA5	20,902		X3L2/93-014			Explanatory notes for the Unified Ideographic CJK Characters Repertoire and Ordering V.1.0, 1991-11-29
1.0.1	U+4E00..9FA5	20,902		X3L2/92-173	N814		Unified CJK Ideographic Character Repertoire & Order V2.0, 1992-04-25
1.0.1	U+4E00..9FA5	20,902		X3L2/93-053	N823		Zhang, Zhoucai (1992-06-27), A minor change with one Kanji glyph in Unified CJK Ideographs
1.0.1	U+4E00..9FA5	20,902		X3L2/93-052	N822		Additional Unified Ideographic CJK Characters (HCS-B), 1992-06-29
1.0.1	U+4E00..9FA5	20,902	UTC/1992-046	X3L2/93-012			Jenkins, John (1992-09-12), Proposed revision to the unification rules
1.0.1	U+4E00..9FA5	20,902		X3L2/93-013			Jenkins, John (1992-10-08), A preliminary examination of a possible composition mechanism for CJK characters
1.0.1	U+4E00..9FA5	20,902	UTC/1993-019				Jenkins, John (1993-09-09), Report from EASC to UTC
1.0.1	U+4E00..9FA5	20,902		X3L2/94-084	N1006		Defect report of J-Column in the CJK Unified Ideographs, 1994-04-05
1.0.1	U+4E00..9FA5	20,902		X3L2/94-098	N1033 (pdf, doc)		Umamaheswaran, V. S.; Ksar, Mike (1994-06-01), "8.1.8", Unconfirmed Minutes of ISO/IEC JTC 1/SC 2/WG 2 Meeting 25, Falez Hotel, Antalya, Turkey, 1994-04-18--22
1.0.1	U+4E00..9FA5	20,902		X3L2/94-109			Proposal for ISO/IEC JET1/SC2 Defect Correction Procedures, 1994-06-01
1.0.1	U+4E00..9FA5	20,902		X3L2/94-111	N1043	N100	Koike, T. (1994-07-07), Draft text of ANNEX: Rules of CJK Unified Ideographs
1.0.1	U+4E00..9FA5	20,902	UTC/1994-024	X3L2/94-108			Adams, Glenn (1994-09-06), IRG #3 Conclusions
1.0.1	U+4E00..9FA5	20,902		X3L2/95-105	N1257		pDAM No. 8 to ISO/IEC 10646-1: New Informative Annex on CJK Ideographs, 1995-09-08
1.0.1	U+4E00..9FA5	20,902		X3L2/95-130	N1318		Hart, Edwin; Edberg, Peter; Jenkins, John (1995-12-13), US comments on PDAM-8, Informative Annex on CJK Ideographs
1.0.1	U+4E00..9FA5	20,902		X3L2/96-066			Kobayashi, Tatsuo (1996-01-26), Proposal for source identifier for CJK ideographs
1.0.1	U+4E00..9FA5	20,902		L2/98-297			Matsuoka, Eiji (1996-04-19), ISO 10646-1.2 (Unicode) and Kanji database
1.0.1	U+4E00..9FA5	20,902	UTC/1996-023				Hart, Edwin, Source Code Separation Rule
1.0.1	U+4E00..9FA5	20,902		X3L2/96-082	N1399		ISO/IEC 10646-1 - Amendment #8, 1996-08-15
1.0.1	U+4E00..9FA5	20,902		L2/97-285	N1649		Paterson, Bruce (1997-09-11), Final text AMD #8 for 10646-1 - procedure for the unification and arrangement of CJK Ideographs
1.0.1	U+4E00..9FA5	20,902		L2/98-138	N1769		Paterson, Bruce (1998-04-06), Revised Text of ISO 10646-1/FPDAM 13: Amendment 13 - CJK unified ideographs with supplementary sources (page 1, 2, 3 and 438 only)
1.0.1	U+4E00..9FA5	20,902		L2/98-278			Kobayashi, Tatsuo (1998-07-30), Sample pages from "Basic Unified Character Set" (BUCS)
1.0.1	U+4E00..9FA5	20,902		L2/99-335	N2109	N674	Zhang, Zhoucai (1999-09-03), SuperCJK, version 9.0 with Kangxi and HYD data
1.0.1	U+4E00..9FA5	20,902		L2/99-385	N2144	N713R	Jenkins, John (1999-12-08), Clarification of the Non-Cognate Rule
1.0.1	U+4E00..9FA5	20,902		L2/99-386	N2145	N715	Change in name of HKSAR Hanza source, 1999-12-09
1.0.1	U+4E00..9FA5	20,902		L2/00-289	N2247		Proposal to Add the Hanja Column of D. R. R. of Korea in ISO/IEC 10646-1 [sic], 2000-08-10
1.0.1	U+4E00..9FA5	20,902		L2/00-291			Everson, Michael (2000-08-30), Comments to Korean proposals (L2/00-284 - 289)
1.0.1	U+4E00..9FA5	20,902		L2/00-299	N2259		Sato, T. K. (2000-09-04), Addition of New Source information on CJK ideographs
1.0.1	U+4E00..9FA5	20,902		L2/01-309			Jenkins, John (2001-08-08), Variation selectors and Han
1.0.1	U+4E00..9FA5	20,902		L2/01-351	N2376		Proposal to add the Hanja code tables of D P R of Korea into ISO/IEC 10646-1:2000 (18194 ideographs to CJK Unified Ideographs and its Extension A), 2001-09-03
1.0.1	U+4E00..9FA5	20,902		L2/02-054			Whistler, Ken (2002-02-04), Error in Canonical Mapping for U+F951
1.0.1	U+4E00..9FA5	20,902		L2/02-121	N2426		Ksar, Mike (2002-03-18), Proposal to add 1 Hanja code of D P R of Korea into 10646-1:2000
1.0.1	U+4E00..9FA5	20,902		L2/02-217	N2468R		Concerns on the VARIATION SELECTORS in ISO/IEC 10646-2, PDAM-1, 2002-05-15
1.0.1	U+4E00..9FA5	20,902		L2/02-070			Moore, Lisa (2002-08-26), "Properties - Error in canonical mapping of U+F951", Minutes for UTC #90
1.0.1	U+4E00..9FA5	20,902		L2/02-415	N2517		Proposal to add 3 hanja codes of D P R of Korea into 10646-1:2000, 2002-11-01
1.0.1	U+4E00..9FA5	20,902		L2/02-437	N2535	N956	Ideograph Unification, 2002-11-21
1.0.1	U+4E00..9FA5	20,902		L2/02-463	N2564		Kim, Kyongsok (2002-11-30), 3-way cross-reference tables - KS X 1001, KPS 9566, and UCS
1.0.1	U+4E00..9FA5	20,902		L2/03-016			Late DPRK Comments on SC 2 N 3624, 10646-1/FPDAM 2, 2002-12-09
1.0.1	U+4E00..9FA5	20,902		L2/03-197			Jenkins, John (2003-06-10), Draft Document to Submit to WG2 on Simplified Chinese
1.0.1	U+4E00..9FA5	20,902		L2/03-285			Cook, Richard (2003-08-24), Submission of kHYPLCDPF data for inclusion in Unihan.txt
1.0.1	U+4E00..9FA5	20,902		L2/03-286			Cook, Richard (2003-08-24), Han variant issues
1.0.1	U+4E00..9FA5	20,902		L2/03-287			Cook, Richard (2003-08-24), 16 UniHan.txt errors
1.0.1	U+4E00..9FA5	20,902		L2/03-288			Cook, Richard (2003-08-24), Submission of kGSR data for inclusion in UniHan.txt
1.0.1	U+4E00..9FA5	20,902		L2/03-301			Cook, Richard (2003-08-27), 24 more UniHan.txt errors
1.0.1	U+4E00..9FA5	20,902		L2/03-311			West, Andrew (2003-09-17), Unicode 4.0.1 Beta Review, comments from Andrew C. West
1.0.1	U+4E00..9FA5	20,902		L2/03-399			Fok, Anthony (2003-10-13), Unihan reported errors / changes re kHKSCS entries
1.0.1	U+4E00..9FA5	20,902		L2/03-356R2			Moore, Lisa (2003-10-22), "Han Ideographs - Unihan updates", UTC #97 Minutes
1.0.1	U+4E00..9FA5	20,902		L2/03-367	N2667		Suignard, Michel; Muller, Eric; Jenkins, John (2003-10-22), CJK Ideograph source references corrections
1.0.1	U+4E00..9FA5	20,902		L2/03-398			Nguyen, D. (2003-10-29), Unihan reported errors / changes re kCowles
1.0.1	U+4E00..9FA5	20,902		L2/03-413			Hiura, Hideki; Kobayashi, Tatsuo; Kida, Yasuo; Muller, Eric; Lunde, Ken; Jenkins, John (2003-10-31), Ideograph Variation Selector and Variation Collection Identifier
1.0.1	U+4E00..9FA5	20,902		L2/03-453			Minutes of the Editorial Group Ad Hoc Discussion, 2003-12-17
1.0.1	U+4E00..9FA5	20,902		L2/04-038			Jenkins, John (2004-01-28), Status of the Unihan database
1.0.1	U+4E00..9FA5	20,902		L2/04-082			Jenkins, John (2004-02-03), A user's guide to the Unihan database
1.0.1	U+4E00..9FA5	20,902		L2/04-138			Cook, Richard (2004-04-22), Proposal to add "kHDZRadBreak" to Unihan.txt
1.0.1	U+4E00..9FA5	20,902		L2/04-208	N2774R	N1064	Proposal to add 6 KP source references to existing CJK Unified Ideographs, 2004-05-25
1.0.1	U+4E00..9FA5	20,902		L2/04-186			Jenkins, John (2004-06-04), Status of the Unihan database
1.0.1	U+4E00..9FA5	20,902		L2/04-219			Muller, Eric (2004-06-06), Registry for Ideographic Variation Sequences
1.0.1	U+4E00..9FA5	20,902		L2/04-336			Muller, Eric (2004-08-06), About the registry of Ideographic Variation Sequences
1.0.1	U+4E00..9FA5	20,902		L2/04-373			Cook, Richard (2004-11-06), Unencoded CJK Ideographs: Proposal to add kXHC data to Unihan.txt
1.0.1	U+4E00..9FA5	20,902		L2/04-420			Muller, Eric (2004-11-18), Report of the Ideographic Variation Sequences ad-hoc
1.0.1	U+4E00..9FA5	20,902		L2/05-227			Muller, Eric (2005-08-20), Draft Letter to ISO regarding Ideographic Variation Sequences
1.0.1	U+4E00..9FA5	20,902		L2/06-208			Jenkins, John (2006-05-16), Additional Fields for the Unihan 5.0 database
1.0.1	U+4E00..9FA5	20,902		L2/06-108			Moore, Lisa (2006-05-25), "Properties - Unihan", UTC #107 Minutes
1.0.1	U+4E00..9FA5	20,902		L2/06-309R			Karlsson, Kent (2006-11-07), Bug in DerivedNumericValues.txt
1.0.1	U+4E00..9FA5	20,902		L2/06-324R2			Moore, Lisa (2006-11-29), "Consensus 109-C17", UTC #109 Minutes, "Add U+6F06 and U+9621 to the list of accounting numbers in the Unihan database."
1.0.1	U+4E00..9FA5	20,902		L2/07-123	N3256		Upcoming version of the Ideographic Variation Database, 2007-04-24
1.0.1	U+4E00..9FA5	20,902		L2/07-159			Jenkins, John (2007-05-10), U-source Database as Versioned Document
1.0.1	U+4E00..9FA5	20,902		L2/07-161			Jenkins, John (2007-05-10), UTC Proposed-Ideograph Database
1.0.1	U+4E00..9FA5	20,902		L2/07-172			Constable, Peter (2007-05-12), Constraint on Ideographic Variation Selector Sequences
1.0.1	U+4E00..9FA5	20,902		L2/07-327	N3359		Changing K5 source reference format from K5-dddd to K5-hhhh, 2007-09-24
1.0.1	U+4E00..9FA5	20,902		L2/08-051			Jenkins, John (2008-01-28), Splitting Up Unihan.txt
1.0.1	U+4E00..9FA5	20,902		L2/08-052			Jenkins, John (2008-01-28), Unihan Frequency Data Derived From Wikimedia
1.0.1	U+4E00..9FA5	20,902		L2/08-109			Muller, Eric (2008-02-07), IVD Update and incorporation in Unicode and in ISO/IEC 10646
1.0.1	U+4E00..9FA5	20,902		L2/08-143	N3408		Suignard, Michel (2008-04-09), Representation of CJK Unified Ideographs in multi-column
1.0.1	U+4E00..9FA5	20,902		L2/08-234		N1406	Cook, Richard; Bishop, Thomas; Lunde, Ken (2008-06-06), Han Unification Issues
1.0.1	U+4E00..9FA5	20,902		L2/08-281			Smith, Joshua J. (2008-08-04), Errors/Inconsistencies in Unihan Database
1.0.1	U+4E00..9FA5	20,902		L2/08-161R2			Moore, Lisa (2008-11-05), "CJK - CJK Unified Ideographs in Multi-column Format", UTC #115 Minutes
1.0.1	U+4E00..9FA5	20,902		L2/08-415			Davis, Mark (2008-11-05), Simplified and Traditional Mappings in Unihan
1.0.1	U+4E00..9FA5	20,902		L2/08-425			Cook, Richard; Lunde, Ken (2008-11-18), IRG Use of IVD Collections
1.0.1	U+4E00..9FA5	20,902		L2/08-430			Cook, Richard (2008-12-16), Proposal to correct Unihan property categories
1.0.1	U+4E00..9FA5	20,902		L2/09-030			Cook, Richard (2009-01-26), Proposal to publish kHanyuPinyin data in Unihan
1.0.1	U+4E00..9FA5	20,902		L2/09-118			Suzuki, Toshiya (2009-04-10), Comparison of UTC and DYC glyph
1.0.1	U+4E00..9FA5	20,902		L2/09-119			Suzuki, Toshiya (2009-04-10), Investigation of DYC-source glyphs in UTR #45
1.0.1	U+4E00..9FA5	20,902		L2/09-017			Cook, Richard; Davis, Mark; Jenkins, John (2009-05-18), Proposal to publish kRSURadBreak data in Unihan
1.0.1	U+4E00..9FA5	20,902		L2/09-223			Davis, Mark (2009-06-11), Unihan organization
1.0.1	U+4E00..9FA5	20,902		L2/09-237			Davis, Mark (2009-07-13), Unihan property names
1.0.1	U+4E00..9FA5	20,902		L2/09-225R			Moore, Lisa (2009-08-17), "Properties — Unihan property names, Properties — Unihan organization", UTC #120 / L2 #217 Minutes
1.0.1	U+4E00..9FA5	20,902		L2/10-034			Member's submission #1 to IRG #34, 2010-01-27
1.0.1	U+4E00..9FA5	20,902		L2/10-035			Member's submission #2 to IRG #34, 2010-01-27
1.0.1	U+4E00..9FA5	20,902		L2/10-100	N3787		Request for disunifying U+2F89F from U+5FF9, 2010-04-07
1.0.1	U+4E00..9FA5	20,902		L2/10-195			Suignard, Michel (2010-05-10), CJK Charts
1.0.1	U+4E00..9FA5	20,902		L2/10-205			Suignard, Michel (2010-05-13), IRG Source format change
1.0.1	U+4E00..9FA5	20,902		L2/10-211			Lunde, Ken (2010-06-16), Adobe-Japan1 IVD Collection: Current Status and Future Directions
1.0.1	U+4E00..9FA5	20,902		L2/10-215			Lunde, Ken (2010-06-22), "Hanyo-Denshi" IVD Collection (PRI 167) to Adobe-Japan1-6 Mapping Table
1.0.1	U+4E00..9FA5	20,902		L2/10-218		N1666	Error report on U+225D6 AND U+2F89F, 2010-06-24
1.0.1	U+4E00..9FA5	20,902		L2/11-032			Davis, Mark; Edberg, Peter; Jenkins, John (2011-01-31), Additions to Unihan needed for CLDR
1.0.1	U+4E00..9FA5	20,902		L2/11-016			Moore, Lisa (2011-02-15), "Properties — Additions to Unihan needed for CLDR", UTC #126 / L2 #223 Minutes
1.0.1	U+4E00..9FA5	20,902			N4008		Kim, Kyongsok; Gim, Gyeongseog (2011-03-04), R.O.Korea's response to Japan's question RE: Idu characters
1.0.1	U+4E00..9FA5	20,902		L2/11-111			Lunde, Ken (2011-04-07), Current Status of IVS Support in OSes & Applications
1.0.1	U+4E00..9FA5	20,902			N4103		"Resolution M58.03 (Correction of G-sources in CJK main block)", Unconfirmed minutes of WG 2 meeting 58, 2012-01-03
1.0.1	U+4E00..9FA5	20,902		L2/12-333			West, Andrew (2012-10-19), Request to UTC to Propose 226 Characters for Inclusion in CJK Extension F [Affects U+5F50, U+753E, and U+7DC7]
1.0.1	U+4E00..9FA5	20,902		L2/13-017			Suignard, Michel (2013-01-24), Unihan data file change
1.0.1	U+4E00..9FA5	20,902		L2/13-018			Add tone marks in Unihan kMandarin field for 114 Han characters, 2013-01-25
1.0.1	U+4E00..9FA5	20,902		L2/13-031			Jenkins, John (2013-01-28), Changes to kEACC field in Unihan database
1.0.1	U+4E00..9FA5	20,902		L2/13-041			Jenkins, John (2013-01-30), Unihan erratum - kMandarin value for U+6535
1.0.1	U+4E00..9FA5	20,902		L2/13-011			Moore, Lisa (2013-02-04), "B.11.10, B.11.10.1.2", UTC #134 Minutes
1.0.1	U+4E00..9FA5	20,902		L2/13-147	N4436		Suignard, Michel (2013-06-02), Proposal to change data format for CJK sources
1.0.1	U+4E00..9FA5	20,902			N4403 (pdf, doc)		Umamaheswaran, V. S. (2014-01-28), "10.4.3 Data format for CJK sources", Unconfirmed minutes of WG 2 meeting 61, Holiday Inn, Vilnius, Lithuania; 2013-06-10/14
1.0.1	U+4E00..9FA5	20,902		L2/14-058			Suignard, Michel (2014-02-03), Proposal to change data format for CJK sources
1.0.1	U+4E00..9FA5	20,902		L2/15-034			Persson, Åke (2015-02-01), Proposed changes in Unihan kMandarin field for 571 Han characters
1.0.1	U+4E00..9FA5	20,902		L2/15-035			Persson, Åke (2015-02-01), Proposed changes in Unihan_Readings.txt
1.0.1	U+4E00..9FA5	20,902		L2/15-065			Jenkins, John (2015-02-02), Proposal to Add IDS Links to Online Unihan Database
1.0.1	U+4E00..9FA5	20,902		L2/15-070			Davis, Mark (2015-02-03), IDS in Unihan
1.0.1	U+4E00..9FA5	20,902		L2/15-036R3			Edberg, Peter (2015-05-05), Unified input on proposed changes to Unihan readings
1.0.1	U+4E00..9FA5	20,902		L2/15-150			Persson, Åke (2015-05-05), Proposed changes in Unihan kMandarin field for 34 Han characters
1.0.1	U+4E00..9FA5	20,902		L2/15-167			Cook, Richard (2015-06-17), Unihan Property Status Report (Unicode 8.0)
1.0.1	U+4E00..9FA5	20,902		L2/15-250			Davis, Mark (2015-10-20), Relations between certain Han properties
1.0.1	U+4E00..9FA5	20,902		L2/15-313			Lunde, Ken (2015-11-03), Request for IDS Data
1.0.1	U+4E00..9FA5	20,902		L2/15-254			Moore, Lisa (2015-11-16), "B.14.5 Relations between certain Han properties", UTC #145 Minutes
1.0.1	U+4E00..9FA5	20,902			N4972		Request to remove K1-6B6B from U+8C6C [Affects U+8C6C], 2018-06-05
1.0.1	U+4E00..9FA5	20,902			N4974	N2301	Request of TCA's Horizontal Extension for Chemical Terminology [Affects U+55B9, U+80BC, U+80E9 U+8132, U+8159, U+841C, and U+915E], 2018-06-12
1.0.1	U+4E00..9FA5	20,902			N4988		Proposal on Updating 11 G glyphs of CJK Unified Ideographs to ISO/IEC 10646 [Affects U+6FF9, 809E and 891D], 2018-06-13
1.0.1	U+4E00..9FA5	20,902			N5075	N2272R2	Request for TCA's Horizontal Extension and Updating 11 T Glyphs [Affects U+7B9A], 2018-10-05
1.0.1	U+4E00..9FA5	20,902			N5020 (pdf, doc)		Umamaheswaran, V. S. (2019-01-11), "10.4.5, 10.4.6, and 10.4.8", Unconfirmed minutes of WG 2 meeting 67
1.0.1	U+4E00..9FA5	20,902		L2/19-242	N5094	N2370	Chan, Eiso (2019-02-14), 20 questionable V4-Source characters in Ext. C and Ext. E [Affects U+6146, U+87CE, and U+8956]
1.0.1	U+4E00..9FA5	20,902			N5078	N2375R	Modify the T-glyph for U+6BD2 and U+93BF [Affects U+6BD2 and U+93BF], 2019-05-10
1.0.1	U+4E00..9FA5	20,902		L2/19-239	N5080	N2338	TCA's feedback to IRG N2338 [Affects U+53FD], 2019-05-14
1.0.1	U+4E00..9FA5	20,902		L2/19-237	N5068		Editorial Report on Miscellaneous Issues (meeting IRG#52) [Affects U+53FD, U+6146, U+6711, U+671C, U+6721, U+6725, U+6BD2, U+87CE, U+8956, and U+93BF], 2019-05-17
1.0.1	U+4E00..9FA5	20,902		L2/19-244	N5107		TCA's UNC Proposal for WG2 submission [Affects U+9B97], 2019-05-24
1.0.1	U+4E00..9FA5	20,902		L2/19-241	N5083	N2391	Errata report for WG2 submission_TCA [Affects U+6711, U+671C, U+6721, and U+6725], 2019-05-31
1.0.1	U+4E00..9FA5	20,902		L2/22-077		N2512R	Shin, SangHyun; Cho, Sungduk; Kim, Kyongsok (2021-11-02), A revised proposal requesting a Horizontal Extension of 51 Hanja chars (previously submitted for ExtF/G/H) [Affects U+833E]
1.0.1	U+4E00..9FA5	20,902		L2/22-042		N2543	Lunde, Ken (2022-02-18), Proposal to disunify U+5F50 into three separate ideographs-redux [Affects U+5F50]
1.0.1	U+4E00..9FA5	20,902		L2/22-067			Lunde, Ken (2022-04-16), "02 [Affects U+585F], 03 [Affects U+6BC0 and 7BC9], 18 [Affects U+5F50], 19 [Affects U+833E]", CJK & Unihan Group Recommendations for UTC #171 Meeting
1.0.1	U+4E00..9FA5	20,902		L2/22-061			Constable, Peter (2022-07-27), "E.1 Section 02 [Affects U+585F], E.1 Section 03 [Affects U+6BC0 and 7BC9], E.1 Section 18 [Affects U+5F50], E.1 Section 19 [Affects U+833E]", Approved Minutes of UTC Meeting 171
1.0.1	U+4E00..9FA5	20,902		L2/22-258			Shin, SangHyun; Kim, Kyongsok (2022-10-14), Changing glyphs and IDSs of 97 KR Hanja chars containing '叱 (U+53F1)' [Affects U+517A, 5391, 54DB, 551C, 551F, 55B8, 55ED, 591E, 5DFC, 5EE4, 65D5, 83BB, and 848A]
1.0.1	U+4E00..9FA5	20,902		L2/22-238			Bai, Yi; Sim, CheonHyeong (2022-10-16), Proposal to consider adding CodeCharts support for kIRG_KPSource representative glyphs [Affects U+3F94, 48EE, and 9166]
1.0.1	U+4E00..9FA5	20,902		L2/22-256		N2580R	T-Source Glyph Correction and Horizontal Extension [Affects U+512D, 56AB, 594A, 5B2E, 5DFD, 65B0, 65F2, 67B2, 6AB6, 6AEC, 6C69, 7019, 7361, 74BD, 7934, 820B, 8412, 8456, 896F, 8E34, 8FD7, and 9C4D], 2022-10-18
1.0.1	U+4E00..9FA5	20,902		L2/22-259		N2556R2	Chan, Eiso; Collins, Lee; Việt, Ngô Trung (2022-10-20), IRGN2556R2 V-Source Glyph and Codes Updates [Affects U+5098, 609E, 65B3, 6FC2, 6FD3, 826E, and 985E]
1.0.1	U+4E00..9FA5	20,902		L2/22-247			Lunde, Ken (2022-11-01), "03) 2022-08-08 07:25:17 CDT [Affects U+9855], 24) L2/22-256, 25) L2/22-258, 26) L2/22-259, and 35) L2/22-238", CJK & Unihan Group Recommendations for UTC #173 Meeting
1.0.1	U+4E00..9FA5	20,902		L2/22-241			Constable, Peter (2022-11-09), "E.1 03) 2022-08-08 07:25:17 CDT, E.1 24) L2/22-256, E.1 25) L2/22-258, E.1 26) L2/22-259, and E.1 35) L2/22-238", Approved Minutes of UTC Meeting 173
1.0.1	U+4E00..9FA5	20,902		L2/23-011			Lunde, Ken (2023-01-11), "11) L2/22-238: Proposal to consider adding CodeCharts support for kIRG_KPSource representative glyphs [Affects U+3F94, 48EE, and 9166]", CJK & Unihan Group Recommendations for UTC #174 Meeting
4.1	U+9FA6..9FBB	22		L2/03-411			Goldsmith, Deborah; Muller, Eric (2003-10-31), Unencoded chars in GB 18030 & HK-SCS
4.1	U+9FA6..9FBB	22		L2/04-161R	N2807		Suignard, Michel; Muller, Eric; Jenkins, John (2004-06-17), HKSCS and GB 18030 PUA characters, background document
4.1	U+9FA6..9FBB	22		L2/04-263	N2808		Suignard, Michel (2004-06-17), HKSCS and GB 18030 PUA characters, request for additional characters and related information
4.1	U+9FA6..9FBB	22		L2/16-237			Chung, Jaemin (2016-08-15), Forty-one kCangjie values to be added and one kCangjie value to be corrected
5.1	U+9FBC..9FC2	7		L2/07-015			Moore, Lisa (2007-02-08), "CJK Unified Ideographs (C.20)", UTC #110 Minutes
5.1	U+9FBC..9FC2	7		L2/07-067R	N3210		Lunde, Ken; Muller, Eric (2007-02-08), Addition of seven CJK Unified Ideographs
5.1	U+9FBC..9FC2	7		L2/07-268	N3253 (pdf, doc)		Umamaheswaran, V. S. (2007-07-26), "M50.25", Unconfirmed minutes of WG 2 meeting 50, Frankfurt-am-Main, Germany; 2007-04-24/27
5.1	U+9FC3	1		L2/07-020			Whistler, Ken (2007-01-15), Feedback Re Proposal to disunify U+4039, L2/07-010
5.1	U+9FC3	1		L2/07-015			Moore, Lisa (2007-02-08), "CJK Character U+4039 (C.3)", UTC #110 Minutes
5.1	U+9FC3	1		L2/07-010	N3196R2		West, Andrew; Jenkins, John (2007-05-01), Proposal to Disunify U+4039
5.1	U+9FC3	1		L2/07-150			Whistler, Ken (2007-05-10), "E", WG2 Consent Docket
5.1	U+9FC3	1		L2/07-118R2			Moore, Lisa (2007-05-23), "111-C17", UTC #111 Minutes
5.1	U+9FC3	1		L2/07-268	N3253 (pdf, doc)		Umamaheswaran, V. S. (2007-07-26), "M50.20", Unconfirmed minutes of WG 2 meeting 50, Frankfurt-am-Main, Germany; 2007-04-24/27
5.2	U+9FC4..9FC6	3			N3353 (pdf, doc)		Umamaheswaran, V. S. (2007-10-10), "M51.10", Unconfirmed minutes of WG 2 meeting 51 Hanzhou, China; 2007-04-24/27
5.2	U+9FC4..9FC6	3		L2/07-387			Proposal to encode six CJK Ideographs in UCS, 2007-10-17
5.2	U+9FC4..9FC6	3		L2/07-345			Moore, Lisa (2007-10-25), "Consensus 113-C15", UTC #113 Minutes, "Accept 2 Japanese ARIB unified ideographs at U+9FC4 and U+9FC5."
5.2	U+9FC4..9FC6	3		L2/08-184	N3318R (pdf, appendix)		Revised proposal to encode six CJK Ideographs in UCS, 2008-03-25
5.2	U+9FC4..9FC6	3		L2/08-318	N3453 (pdf, doc)		Umamaheswaran, V. S. (2008-08-13), "M52.2k", Unconfirmed minutes of WG 2 meeting 52
5.2	U+9FC7..9FCB	5		L2/08-174			Six characters to be submitted for inclusion in the BMP, 2008-04-22
5.2	U+9FC7..9FCB	5		L2/08-372	N3513	N1405R	Revised proposal for Six urgently needed characters submitted for inclusion, 2008-06-09
5.2	U+9FC7..9FCB	5			N3513-A		Addition of five Hong Kong Supplementary Character Sets characters, 2008-09-24
5.2	U+9FC7..9FCB	5		L2/08-412	N3553 (pdf, doc)		Umamaheswaran, V. S. (2008-11-05), "M53.07", Unconfirmed minutes of WG 2 meeting 53
5.2	U+9FC7..9FCB	5		L2/08-361			Moore, Lisa (2008-12-02), "Consensus 117-C20", UTC #117 Minutes
6.1	U+9FCC	1		L2/07-333			Lunde, Ken (2007-10-02), Proposal to add twenty-one CJK Unified Ideographs to the UCS
6.1	U+9FCC	1		L2/10-212			Lunde, Ken (2010-06-16), Proposal to Add Two Ideographs to Extension E
6.1	U+9FCC	1		L2/10-221			Moore, Lisa (2010-08-23), "B.14.2", UTC #124 / L2 #221 Minutes
6.1	U+9FCC	1		L2/10-228	N3885		Lunde, Ken (2010-08-24), Proposal to append one CJK Unified Ideograph to the URO
6.1	U+9FCC	1			N3903 (pdf, doc)		"M57.02h", Unconfirmed minutes of WG2 meeting 57, 2011-03-31
8.0	U+9FCD..9FCF	3		L2/12-333			West, Andrew (2012-10-19), Request to UTC to Propose 226 Characters for Inclusion in CJK Extension F [Affects U+9FCF]
8.0	U+9FCD..9FCF	3				N1967	Proposal on 3 China's UNCs, 2013-11-04
8.0	U+9FCD..9FCF	3		L2/14-082	N4508		Proposal on 3 China's UNCs, 2014-03-12
8.0	U+9FCD..9FCF	3				N1988	Additional Request for the 3 China's UNCs, 2014-03-21
8.0	U+9FCD..9FCF	3			N4553 (pdf, doc)		Umamaheswaran, V. S. (2014-09-16), "M62.15", Minutes of WG 2 meeting 62 Adobe, San Jose, CA, USA
8.0	U+9FCD..9FCF	3		L2/14-260	N4621		Suignard, Michel (2014-10-23), CJK chart and source references update
8.0	U+9FCD..9FCF	3		L2/14-250			Moore, Lisa (2014-11-10), "Consensus 141-C7", UTC #141 Minutes
8.0	U+9FCD..9FCF	3		L2/16-052	N4603 (pdf, doc)		Umamaheswaran, V. S. (2015-09-01), "M63.02d, M63.05", Unconfirmed minutes of WG 2 meeting 63
8.0	U+9FCD..9FCF	3		L2/15-262			Disposition of Comments on ISO/IEC CD 10646 (Ed.5), 2015-10-26
8.0	U+9FD0	1		L2/14-197	N4582	N2010	Lu, Qin (2014-05-23), "Resolution IRG M42.4", Resolutions of IRG Meeting #42
8.0	U+9FD0	1		L2/14-260	N4621		Suignard, Michel (2014-10-23), CJK chart and source references update
8.0	U+9FD0	1		L2/14-250			Moore, Lisa (2014-11-10), "Consensus 141-C7, 141-C9", UTC #141 Minutes
8.0	U+9FD0	1		L2/16-052	N4603 (pdf, doc)		Umamaheswaran, V. S. (2015-09-01), "M63.02d, M63.05", Unconfirmed minutes of WG 2 meeting 63
8.0	U+9FD1..9FD5	5		L2/12-333			West, Andrew (2012-10-19), Request to UTC to Propose 226 Characters for Inclusion in CJK Extension F
8.0	U+9FD1..9FD5	5				N1888	UTC/US Character Submission for Extension F, 2012-11-08
8.0	U+9FD1..9FD5	5		L2/13-032			Jenkins, John (2013-01-28), Proposed Urgently Needed Characters Submission from the UTC to the IRG
8.0	U+9FD1..9FD5	5				N1936R2	UTC/US Urgently-needed Character Submission, 2013-05-20
8.0	U+9FD1..9FD5	5			N4584A, N4584B, N4584C	N2005	UTC/US Urgently-needed Character Submission, 2014-05-15
8.0	U+9FD1..9FD5	5		L2/14-250			Moore, Lisa (2014-11-10), "Consensus 141-C7", UTC #141 Minutes
8.0	U+9FD1..9FD5	5		L2/16-052	N4603 (pdf, doc)		Umamaheswaran, V. S. (2015-09-01), "M63.02e", Unconfirmed minutes of WG 2 meeting 63
8.0	U+9FD1..9FD5	5			N4987		Proposal on China's Horizontal Extension for 14 CJK Ideographs [Affects U+9FD4], 2018-06-13
8.0	U+9FD1..9FD5	5			N5020 (pdf, doc)		Umamaheswaran, V. S. (2019-01-11), "10.4.9", Unconfirmed minutes of WG 2 meeting 67
10.0	U+9FD6..9FE9	20		L2/13-009	N4583		Shardt, Yuri; Chin, Mitrophan; Andreev, Aleksandr (2013-01-22), Proposal to Encode Chinese Characters Used for Transliterating Slavonic
10.0	U+9FD6..9FE9	20		L2/13-112			Anderson, Deborah; Jenkins, John (2013-05-05), Options for handling Proposal for Transliterating Slavonic (L2/13-009)
10.0	U+9FD6..9FE9	20		L2/13-058			Moore, Lisa (2013-06-12), "B.15.1", UTC #135 Minutes
10.0	U+9FD6..9FE9	20		L2/14-238R	N4627		Anderson, Deborah (2014-10-17), Response to PDAM2 ballot comments from Great Britain on Chinese Characters needed for Slavonic
10.0	U+9FD6..9FE9	20		L2/14-250			Moore, Lisa (2014-11-10), "Consensus 141-C7", UTC #141 Minutes
10.0	U+9FD6..9FE9	20		L2/15-047			Anderson, Deborah (2015-02-01), CJK Slavonic transcription characters
10.0	U+9FD6..9FE9	20		L2/15-017			Moore, Lisa (2015-02-12), "B.15.1", UTC #142 Minutes
10.0	U+9FD6..9FE9	20		L2/15-170			Andreev, Aleksandr; Chin, Mitrophan; Shardt, Yuri (2015-07-08), Proposal to Add the Palladius Transcription to the Unihan Database
10.0	U+9FD6..9FE9	20		L2/16-052	N4603 (pdf, doc)		Umamaheswaran, V. S. (2015-09-01), "M63.02f", Unconfirmed minutes of WG 2 meeting 63
10.0	U+9FEA	1				N2048	Chung, Jaemin (2014-11-19), U+3E02 unification issue
10.0	U+9FEA	1		L2/16-203			Moore, Lisa (2016-08-18), "B.11.3.2", UTC #148 Minutes
11.0	U+9FEB..9FED	3		L2/12-333			West, Andrew (2012-10-19), Request to UTC to Propose 226 Characters for Inclusion in CJK Extension F [Affects U+9FED]
11.0	U+9FEB..9FED	3		L2/17-156R	N4830		Proposal on 3 China's UNCs for Chemical Terminology to URO+, 2017-07-26
11.0	U+9FEB..9FED	3		L2/17-103			Moore, Lisa (2017-05-18), "B.3.4", UTC #151 Minutes
11.0	U+9FEB..9FED	3		L2/17-397	N4832		Proposal on 2 TCA's UNCs for Chemical Terminology to URO+, 2017-09-07
11.0	U+9FEB..9FED	3			N4953 (pdf, doc)		"M66.08a and c", Unconfirmed minutes of WG 2 meeting 66, 2018-03-23
11.0	U+9FEB..9FED	3		L2/17-362			Moore, Lisa (2018-02-02), "Consensus 153-C8", UTC #153 Minutes
11.0	U+9FEE..9FEF	2		L2/17-396	N4831		Proposal to add two Urgently Needed Characters, 2017-07-20
11.0	U+9FEE..9FEF	2			N4953 (pdf, doc)		"M66.08b", Unconfirmed minutes of WG 2 meeting 66, 2018-03-23
11.0	U+9FEE..9FEF	2		L2/17-362			Moore, Lisa (2018-02-02), "Consensus 153-C8", UTC #153 Minutes
13.0	U+9FF0..9FFC	13		L2/19-238	N5072R	N2378R	UNC Proposal on China & TCA Science and technology, 2019-05-02
13.0	U+9FF0..9FFC	13		L2/19-244	N5107		TCA's UNC Proposal for WG2 submission, 2019-05-24
13.0	U+9FF0..9FFC	13			N5122		"M68.08", Unconfirmed minutes of WG 2 meeting 68, 2019-12-31
13.0	U+9FF0..9FFC	13		L2/19-270			Moore, Lisa (2019-10-07), "Consensus 160-C10", UTC #160 Minutes
14.0	U+9FFD..9FFF	3		L2/20-203	N5140	N2437	Submission of 5 Macao SARG UNC Characters and One TCA UNC character, 2020-08-08
14.0	U+9FFD..9FFF	3		L2/20-205			Chan, Eiso (2020-08-26), Feedback on MC-00137 glyph in L2/20-203
14.0	U+9FFD..9FFF	3		L2/20-204			UNC Proposal for Two UTC-Source Ideographs, 2020-08-31
14.0	U+9FFD..9FFF	3		L2/20-235			Lunde, Ken (2020-09-22), "4)UAX #38 / Unihan Database Documents", Unihan Ad Hoc Recommendations for UTC #165 Meeting
14.0	U+9FFD..9FFF	3		L2/20-237			Moore, Lisa (2020-10-27), "Consensus 165-C9", UTC #165 Minutes
14.0	U+9FFD..9FFF	3		L2/23-082			Lunde, Ken (2023-04-22), "11 [Affects U+9FFD]", CJK & Unihan Group Recommendations for UTC #175 Meeting
14.0	U+9FFD..9FFF	3		L2/23-076			Constable, Peter (2023-05-01), "E.1 Section 11 [Affects U+9FFD]", UTC #175 Minutes
