= CJK Unified Ideographs (YES order) =

Method for ordering Han characters

CJK Unified Ideographs (YES order) is a list of CJK Unified Ideographs sorted in YES order, a simpler alternative to the traditional Radical order employed in CJK Unified Ideographs (Unicode block), List of CJK Unified Ideographs, part 1, part 2, part 3, part 4.

== YES order ==
YES is a simplified stroke-based sorting method free of stroke counting and grouping, without comprise in accuracy. Briefly speaking, YES arranges Chinese characters according to their stroke orders and an "alphabet" of 30 strokes:

㇐ ㇕ ㇅ ㇎ ㇡ ㇋ ㇊ ㇍ ㇈ ㇆ ㇇ ㇌  ㇀ ㇑ ㇗ ㇞ ㇉ ㄣ ㇙ ㇄ ㇟ ㇚ ㇓ ㇜ ㇛ ㇢ ㇔ ㇏ ㇂

built on the basis of Unicode CJK strokes.

== Character list ==
(Here is a list of the 20,992 CJK Unified Ideographs (Unicode block) sorted in YES order)

list

一 二 三 亖 弎 弐 丰 彗 慧 熭 匡 劻 邼 砉 剨 匤 貳 贰 栔 契 齧 蛪 洯 挈 觢 絜 㛃 恝 艳 耫 耩 耕 耘 耟 耤 耯 耢 耓 耨 頛 耰 耙 耞 耔 耚 耝 耡 耬 耦 耜 䎱 耖 耥 耗 耠 耣 耭 耛 耲 耱 耪 耧 耮 耒 寿 焘 邦 帮 幚 邫 奉 奏 春 蠢 惷 泰 秦 舂 憃 韦 韨 韧 韫 韬 违 夀 弍 干 王 龶 琹 琵 琶 珡 琴 瑟 麉 弄 獒 鏊 遨 敖 驁 聱 骜 嗸 贅 鼇 螯 赘 嶅 摮 鳌 鰲 鷔 嫯 謷 熬 責 勣 匵 责 青 郬 靚 靓 靗 靔 靝  静 靘 鶄 靜 靛 靑 武 虣 鹉 鵡 匞 毒 纛 麸 麺 𪎊 鿺 麹 麦 頇 顸 表 兲 素 繛 丟 玊 玉 迋 匭 貮 邗 玤 琫 瑃 瑧 玮 玕 玨 璱 璈 珷 瑇 珏 玗 琎 玩 瓉 玞 玒 珪 瑪 璹 瓙 瓄 琽 珯 珐 璉 瑼 璤 璷 琙 珸 璼 瓎 珂 瑮 瑓 玵 珥 琪 璂 瑘 璍 瓂 瑾 璜 璊 玴 璢 珙 瑱 瑚 𤩽 瓘 瑛 璓 璥 瓁 瑹 瑨 璴 琳 琜 琏 玡 琊 玙 珁 玭 瑎 玎 球 瑊 珬 珹 頊 瓇 顼 珛 瑌 珔 环 珑 瓑 琢 琦 璙 瓀 玶 琖 珒 璕 璶 璛 珢 琭 珺 瑕 珉 瑉 玘 琚 玦 瑋 鿱 瑂 玛 璆 璻 玚 玏 珕 珈 玿 珝 玻 瑈 璚 璒 瑵 瓍 琲 琡 瓛 璩 瓐 琥 玷 琸 玼 璨 璿 珇 珵 瑅 㻫 琨 瑒 現 珼 瓔 玾 珅 理 琩 瑁 瑥 瓓 瑆 璟 琝 璝 瓃 璐 珿 琾 璪 琄 琠 珚 環 现 璎 珃 璞 瑞 璀 瓗 琌 珖 珰 瑣 琐 琑 璫 瑺 璏 瑑 瑻 玌 玝 珄 璑 珤 珠 璳 琁 珽 瓚 瓒 珗 琍 瓈 琇 珻 珴 玫 玑 玥 琱 玸 玽 珣 珊 玓 玬 琤 瑍 瓊 珎 㺵 瑤 玖 琒 珞 珮 珟 璵 瑖 玳 珀 瑝 鳿 碧 瑦 瑔 琕 瑰 瓅 璬 瑡 瑀 璁 珦 玔 琟 㻽 璡 琘 珋 瑠 瓆 珘 珩 瑽 琋 珧 璠 瑗 琈 瑶 瑫 瑷 璦 玐 琻 㻅 珨 璯 瑜 玱 玢 玠 珍 玜 瑲 玪 琀 玲 璣 珆 玧 璅 𤨏 瑙 琂 璇 瓖 琼 璮 瓌 玣 瑭 斑 璃 琗 珓 玟 珳 玹 琉 珫 琣 璋 璄 瓏 瓋 璾 𤧛 琅 瑯 琿 璭 珲 琛 珌 珜 瑳 琷 班 瑐 璘 璲 珶 璔 㼆 琰 琮 琓 琔 瑄 璌 璸 琯 琬 瑸 瑏 瑢 璖 琺 珱 式 甙 冓 顜 覯 觏 遘 斠 匿 𧏾 䘌 慝 刊 匶 击 攼 鳱 膥 斄 漦 剺 孷 釐 犛 氂 嫠 末 未 唜 迀 覝 匦 亐 亏 迃 专 于 亍 邘 盂 示 祘 迂 幵 栞 郉 开 亓 井 坓 奭 刱 邢 刑 型 汬 鳽 雃 形 丼 进 烎 戒 頑 顽 邧 刓 无 元 坖 黿 鼋 兘 远 鄻 鄼 輦 辇 替 賛 蠺 蝅 邞 規 鬹 槼 嫢 规 鬶 椝 鳺 㥦 匧 迗 天 夫 吞 昋 奣 匲 蚕 沗 忝 鴌 戎 云 叇 动 䰟 魂 叆 运 忈 戋 盏 刬 弌 疌 妻 郪 鶈 巨 巪 乬 螶 鴺 夷 戸 匜 万 劢 趸 虿 迈 丅 十 工 士 土 匪 長 隷 款 镸 瓺 镾 镽 肆 镼 䦉 镻 镺 镹 髟 鬊 髨 髻 鬐 鬎 髶 鬗 髰 髸 鬒 鬍 鬕 髩 鬆 髤 鬌 髪 髮 髵 髬 髡 髴 髢 髫 髲 髳 髭 鬘 鬝 鬜 鬄 𩮜 髷 鬞 鬟 鬛 髥 髯 髾 髦 䰖 髺 鬁 鬏 䰀 髠 鬅 髱 鬇 髼 鬔 鬂 髹 鬚 䯼 鬉 髽 鬠 鬖 鬣 髣 鬤 髧 鬈 鬑 鬋 鬀 鬙 鬃 鬢 鬓 鬡 髿 圭 壵 奊 鼃 恚 載 酨 馬 騞 馯 駴 駥 駏 騳 驫 驍 驖 驝 驅 駷 驃 驔 騕 驪 馷 馶 駬 騏 驟 驊 騹 驧 驠 驑 騲 驩 騋 馵 駵 駓 駹 駀 騵 騎 駆 騻 馱 䭾 駄 駤 驦 駍 騝 驌 騄 駸 騢 駶 驏 駅 駃 騽 馳 駋 龮 駊 騥 驈 騤 驋 馭 騒 騷 騛 騑 驢 驉 驥 馹 駔 駻 騠 驆 騍 騉 騔 騴 馽 駎 龭 騁 騾 騦 驒 駽 駰 駚 駛 騧 驛 駟 駧 駉 驜 驨 駫 駯 騈 駞 駪 騬 馲 騀 駇 驕 馺 騆 駒 駨 騶 騊 騘 馰 駱 颿 騪 駈 駳 駙 騜 騡 騩 驄 馴 騅 駠 騮 馸 駣 騣 駁 騱 駩 騇 駼 驗 験 騟 駗 駖 騐 駘 騃 馻 駿 驂 駐 驐 驤 驙 騼 駮 馼 駭 騂 騿 騯 駺 馿 騸 騙 遤 馾 駜 駢 驣 騚 驎 駾 驓 駲 騌 驞 駝 騨 垚 顤 堯 翹 遶 封 堼 鞤 幇 犎 幫 劸 邽 郌 刲 卦 栽 载 寺 邿 臷 声 漀 馨 毊 鏧 殸 聲 磬 㲈 罄 撀 謦 韾 壭 壽 翿 魗 燾 正 韯 焉 鄢 龩 走 赶 趬 趌 趚 趣 趞 趪 越 趔 趰 趢 起 趘 赽 趯 赲 超 趐 趈 趠 趄 趕 趧 䟆 趩 趗 趮 赸 赻 赴 趙 趟 趉 赳 趎 趃 趲 趱 趏 趫 趓 趨 赹 趜 趋 趂 赼 趍 趡 趭 趀 赿 趆 赾 赵 趒 趖 龪 趛 趁 赺 趝 趇 趑 趦 趥 趤 吉 貢 慐 喆 嚞 博 頡 颉 劼 翓 郆 戴 蛓 㐖 欯 鴶 遠 袁 迼 臺 壴 嘉 喜 囍 噽 嚭 敼 歖 憙 熹 壾 鼚 鼟 鼜 鼛 鼕 鼓 瞽 鼞 鼙 鼘 尌 皷 鼔 彭 𥛱 甏 蟚 哉 賣 皾 覿 夁 贡 胾 靕 頙 政 鴊 卋 枽 鼖 桒 尭 賁 翸 歕 贲 鿊 毐 凷 亞 琧 堊 蝁 惡 鵶 丐 汞 耂 考 耊 孝 教 卉 者 乽 翥 都 覩 殾 斱 煑 煮 截 龳 圥 赤 赭 赫 頳 䞓 赮 赧 𧹞 郝 赬 赪 赨 赦 螫 赩 赥 赯 耇 耉 老 耋 耆 耄 耈 坴 逵 勎 埶 驇 槷 勢 暬 摰 熱 鵱 燅 鼀 夌 逺 去 弆 却 叝 刧 劫 䂲 刼 鼁 朅 唟 盍 刦 迲 圡 裁 瑴 轂 榖 豰 彀 壼 瞉 嗀 壹 皼 亄 鷧 懿 壸 毂 穀 殼 螜 愨 觳 鷇 槖 蠧 縠 糓 壺 壷 壶 殻 慤 壳 悫 売 壱 志 覟 達 幸 報 盩 執 墊 騺 贄 蟄 漐 摯 鷙 縶 謺 褺 慹 瓡 逹 烖 灻 赱 五 亘 車 轊 軭 輳 轃 軒 軖 輤 軾 転 轅 轒 輘 轟 轋 轉 輻 轞 軻 輏 輔 輌 輛 輙 輒 輁 軲 轥 轕 轖 軘 輱 轗 軛 軷 輀 𨎪 輭 軏 轣 輢 軑 軚 轑 輊 輕 鑋 輺 轜 轌 軯 輚 匷 𣰋 㪺 輑 輾 轏 轇 軺 軔 輮 輟 軽 軐 戜 輫 轤 軙 軎 輠 輥 輰 輼 輯 輵 軸 轠 毄 軦 軹 軮 轘 轀 軜 輞 轐 轛 軕 輲 輄 輎 檕 墼 轚 礊 蟿 罊 擊 繫 軋 軞 輧 軼 軠 輹 轎 軗 撃 繋 軌 軓 輣 輖 軳 軥 輷 輓 輡 軟 輅 輗 軵 鿂 轢 軝 軧 斬 塹 槧 磛 暫 輴 覱 蹔 鏨 慙 輈 軱 轓 軤 輍 轁 龫 輇 輸 輪 軫 軡 軨 軪 輽 軩 轈 輜 軴 輬 轆 較 輆 轍 軶 連 軣 轙 軿 輶 轔 轄 輐 輨 刯 專 甎 鄟 剸 鷒 惠 匣 鶇 東 尃 乶 喸 盙 鿿 旉 敷 懯 郠 更 甦 匽 郾 鶠 事 剚 彧 或 惑 畺 専 曺 匱 哥 戨 歌 匮 画 叀 恵 吾 郚 畐 副 鶝 逼 疈 匰 區 甌 敺 剾 毆 歐 鷗 敔 逜 鬲 鬴 鞷 翮 融 鬺 鹝 鷊 鬸 鬷 叓 亜 曹 遭 悪 臣 頣 鋻 臤 堅 豎 硻 孯 賢 蜸 腎 掔 緊 婜 竪 贒 卧 盬 鹽 臨 覧 監 覽 擥 鑒 譼 鍳 朢 臥 頼 勅 鶒 剌 揧 遫 敕 整 鷘 慗 賴 赖 遬 欶 鵣 辢 速 束 栆 橐 蠹 囊 蟗 櫜 嚢 叵 尀 可 㪃 吏 忢 豆 逗 豇 豉 䜺 鿲 頭 郖 剅 毭 豍 豏 豌 戓 覀 襾 票 顠 勡 翲 剽 飄 飘 瓢 彯 垔 甄 鄄 歅 覊 覉 覇 鷅 栗 遷 覃 鷣 賈 贾 覄 覈 覆 覂 要 覅 粟 僰 棗 枣 西 酉 酐 酑 酛 酜 酝 醻 酵 醏 醘 醧 醩 酠 醥 醰 釃 酺 酾 酣 醋 醼 酤 醐 醛 酽 醂 酊 酎 醎 醢 酭 醃 酞 醹 醽 醆 醁 配 醪 酏 醑 醊 醗 醱 醵 酟 酲 醍 醌 醖 醒 釅 醴 醲 醠 醳 醞 酮 醭 酦 酕 酢 酷 酰 醺 酥 酶 酘 酔 醄 酌 酩 酪 醙 醜 醀 醮 酯 酗 酹 酻 釂 酫 酴 醶 䤈 酚 䤌 酳 酸 醦 醇 醕 釀 醾 釄 醿 醣 醸 醨 醉 酼 醯 醅 醷 酿 逎 酖 醓 醝 醚 醈 酬 酙 酧 酡 醡 廼 迺 婯 麗 酈 鸝 彲 邐 鶫 柬 亙 𠕅 𠕂 甫 郙 鵏 逋 帀 巿 再 匝 両 䴓 鳾 棘 刺 敇 兩 朿 迊 雨 協 丙 邴 两 协 丽 郦 鹂 彨 逦 頍 鳷 卖 觌 支 攳 攰 翅 垹 埲 堾 埥 塐 圬 圩 坃 坛 墝 壔 墕 墳 埡 堵 堎 墶 垣 塼 埬 埂 堰 域 壃 堛 塸 塥 壏 坷 墂 堙 塛 墰 㙘 堜 埔 坩 堪 墈 壣 墷 墸 壒 墐 墴 堞 垬 塂 塨 埴 填 墘 壊 塻 壦 埖 塔 塃 垭 墻 圷 墙 坘 坉 巧 瓨 堦 圢 堐 堶 堿 坜 城 墭 坺 墄 坧 項 项 壥 㘵 堧 墆 坏 坯 垅 壢 塬 埼 塽 埉 垯 垮 埯 垤 墵 壩 壖 坪 垏 壗 垠 埭 埐 埽 坲 垊 圯 圮 墛 壀 墀 堀 坭 塀 块 堳 垜 场 卭 地 逇 功 巭 壻 坡 㙍 埇 墱 墢 邛 圵 垰 埱 垆 壉 壚 墟 址 埗 坫 塷 龼 坦 坥 垾 埧 埕 塒 堤 堁 堒 埘 場 垷 垻 壜 塌 坤 埋 塿 塭 墁 墹 壛 堣 埸 堨 墤 壝 堺 堮 塤 壧 墠 埙 埍 埚 堌 坱 堝 堽 墿 塄 坝 垇 垌 㘱 坰 埛 堈 墣 圸 塏 堓 垲 塴 墔 埁 圤 盐 垙 垱 埫 壋 堟 坶 圠 墲 垁 圪 圲 埵 塲 堹 塩 壎 塖 圫 攻 坆 墧 圾 垛 坄 巬 𦕓 巩 聓 鞏 跫 蛩 銎 恐 堋 垉 坸 坞 圽 圴 坍 均 鋆 垝 埩 堍 埆 埳 坎 垑 埄 塳 鿍 垎 堸 塅 堄 坵 埏 坿 垘 垍 堭 𪣝 塢 埤 塊 墽 垖 埠 塠 堠 墺 塮 垧 圳 堢 堆 坁 坻 塯 塡 圻 垢 坼 坂 垳 㙡 坬 垗 堫 墦 垀 埰 埒 埓 垺 塪 圦 垥 墖 堬 埨 坋 圿 塕 坅 坽 埝 㘭 坳 坮 埃 埈 墋 堖 壪 坊 埻 墎 墩 壤 塙 壕 𡒄 壇 壈 壞 塆 圹 壙 墌 墉 塘 𡐓 塶 坑 垿 壌 垴 埣 坟 垓 堉 垃 垶 培 堷 墇 墥 境 壠 墑 墒 塝 埌 鿾 塜 堚 塚 塓 坈 堔 塉 垟 墡 坢 垪 堘 埢 墫 壿 塧 増 增 埮 垸 埞 塇 坾 垨 垞 埦 坨 埪 堗 塎 坹 垵 墚 堩 艹 卄 龷 廿 甘 耳 聽 聶 顳 颞 聂 蔧 葜 藉 藕 某 其 䫏 剘 甚 卙 戡 勘 尠 歁 夦 斟 期 欺 斯 蟴 菶 基 棊 碁 萶 蜝 朞 蓁 綦 諅 惎 苇 邯 聙 耺 聇 聐 聝 聑 聴 耵 聏 耾 聗 聀 棸 郰 鄹 聚 聧 取 埾 娶 焣 耶 鿣 鿤 鿢 耻 聖 聘 聵 聩 职 耼 聃 刵 聉 耴 毦 聅 聕 聒 聦 聸 聣 鵈 聛 聭 聥 聰 聊 聎 聁 聄 聬 聡 耹 聆 聈 聨 聫 聯 聮 聤 職 耽 恥 聠 联 聪 褧 耿 聢 聍 聺 聜 聹 芉 蔜 蔶 菁 羐 黃 華 鷨 茉 苿 芌 芋 蒜 甛 茾 荆 荊 芜 芫 䓕 芙 菾 茙 芸 萐 萋 苣 荑 芏 萇 蕻 蕼 茥 蕘 葑 薵 蔫 薳 薹 薣 藚 蕡 著 荖 蓍 蓺 藝 爇 䕭 菱 蓋 薘 蕔 蓻 昔 荁 莗 菫 堇 蓒 勤 懃 鄞 覲 觐 歏 斳 蘻 蔪 蓮 囏 艱 歎 難 臡 戁 皵 革 䩬 靬 鞲 靺 靯 鞋 鞊 韇 韃 鞕 韁 韆 鞆 鞾 靾 鞢 鞴 鞯 韊 韈 韄 鞳 韉 靪 鞡 靰 鞑 鞬 鞎 靷 鞃 靵 靶 勒 鞀 靭 靱 鞁 鞣 靫 蓴 蕙 鞐 靼 靻 鞓 鞮 鞸 鞻 鞰 䪍 鞨 韅 鞼 鞙 鞇 鞅 靹 鞘 鞩 鞝 鞺 剒 鞜 鞦 鞂 鞽 鞒 靸 鞄 靮 鞫 鞠 韂 鞔 鞭 鞞 靴 靳 鞉 鞱 鞵 鞖 菄 鞈 鞥 䩺 靲 靿 鞿 鞟 鞹 蒪 韀 鞛 靽 鞧 鞚 鞍 㪚 鹊 鵲 斮 莄 逪 薑 鷰 嬊 燕 酀 黄 黊 黇 鷬 黅 黈 黆 斢 葍 蓲 蒚 虉 蓸 茞 菣 藖 藍 藾 藗 蔌 苛 荳 蔈 薽 蕈 葽 茜 莤 蓜 蘸 萰 莆 散 芾 蕀 莿 蓛 顢 茦 苪 颟 芰 茿 蒆 荺 莰 蘾 苷 茸 萁 葚 蘛 藄 藂 菆 蘵 蓳 蘜 龩 蘳 蘣 葉 苦 蒖 蘁 茝 葫 萳 荰 蓕 藲 菻 葙 藮 菥 莁 薔 萊 菘 萙 蒁 苯 莕 芐 荸 葧 蔷 世 枼 莲 畱 貰 勩 贳 勚 芚 萅 芽 蕥 迣 苆 芘 荜 蒈 艼 荴 蓵 蒱 菝 萔 萚 菗 蘀 莏 葀 菢 蓷 菈 莍 莀 蓐 鿀 蘙 蔵 葴 葳 苊 苈 荿 薤 薚 茢 塟 葬 𦵏 薞 苃 茇 茬 蒧 若 鿓 虁 蕆 蘷 藞 鄀 蠚 逽 惹 鿒 蒇 荋 荐 蔕 芣 苤 藏 苉 茏 藶 蒝 藸 蓫 蕤 共 䢼 薾 蕨 䳍 蕐 莢 荙 荗 芖 荂 萘 莾 輂 巷 菴 蛬 恭 拲 莽 葢 茂 荎 菿 莖 葝 葘 蕓 薷 蕾 虂 蘦 蘎 藿 蕶 苹 莱 荚 炗 荛 菚 芅 古 直 𡌴 矗 茟 嗭 亁 真 顛 颠 鷏 惪 龺 韩 戟 韓 蕁 乹 乾 鶾 雗 朝 倝 幹 榦 翰 螒 斡 悳 荨 藎 蕭 萧 瓳 茛 蔇 莭 菉 芛 莙 蔒 菷 嘏 蕸 葭 畞 噩 喪 賷 賾 赜 頤 颐 巸 媐 熙 煕 芎 葞 虇 蔃 苐 茀 苰 蒻 苠 芑 䀇 蔚 藯 故 胡 鹕 鶦 鶘 鸪 鴣 薜 蘗 兢 勀 克 兙 尅 兡 兣 勊 剋 兞 兛 兝 荱 苨 芵 荩 辜 怘 葦 芭 葿 㥁 藋 蓼 艿 萾 莻 艺 节 芀 艻 茘 荔 苕 茄 苏 荵 南 献 遖 蔬 芓 蒸 芤 荪 菰 蓀 菡 茎 芧 蕷 蓣 茅 葇 蓩 鶜 蓪 葵 蕟 荬 芆 蔯 藬 荫 蕯 蘟 蒢 蔭 萨 薩 丗 菲 韮 蘴 蕜 茮 菽 蘧 蔖 蘆 藘 萀 苝 芷 薉 蕋 蘃 荹 蘋 苫 䓬 蓾 茈 薒 帯 苴 苜 萛 繤 藈 草 蒔 蕞 蓽 菓 菒 菋 薡 菎 莳 莧 萈 鄚 蘡 萴 茣 莫 墓 驀 蓦 募 暮 蟇 幕 慕 摹 謩 蔝 莇 荲 菖 萺 蕌 蔞 藪 蒀 蔓 菛 蘭 蔄 蕳 蕑 藺 蔅 蕄 萬 勱 躉 蠆 邁 葺 蕺 葃 萌 葛 茰 苢 莂 苗 苖 葨 莮 蕢 藟 蘲 蘽 虆 薗 蒉 蕗 鹋 鶓 莡 蔂 葸 莒 萼 蒷 虈 蔮 蕇 鄿 蘄 蕚 雚 顴 颧 勸 酄 觀 鹳 歡 飌 鸛 莴 茧 虄 蕽 蓶 茵 蒽 鶧 鿦 英 鿦 荶 萵 薖 蓇 茴 薯 蘮 蔑 蕒 薥 萝 蘿 藣 藅 甍 薨 瞢 夢 顭 鄸 薎 蘉 菌 苋 苬 蒕 萞 莔 荝 蔨 䒣 茼 芇 苒 苘 萜 繭 芮 菵 卌 蓝 薱 带 茪 莦 萷 蒃 苺 莊 蘠 蔣 茁 荍 苡 芞 苼 蕪 蒛 茱 芼 薙 苵 䒗 芊 苲 莛 菙 董 薫 薰 蘍 䒷 薐 萂 蒩 藒 莉 蕱 蘈 菞 蔾 藜 蘒 蘓 萟 薭 蘶 藊 蕛 萩 萪 莠 萫 萎 蘩 莓 苌 莪 芺 蕎 荞 芨 芟 芁 艽 芃 芄 萉 菔 荕 苚 葄 萠 蒯 葋 虅 蕂 藤 蔔 葡 苞 苟 荀 檠 敬 驚 蟼 擎 警 憼 蒭 萄 芴 茐 葱 芶 芍 茑 菊 薝 萯 蓟 藓 薊 蘇 蘚 莬 葂 菟 藑 薢 葪 蔛 萏 芡 芕 荈 苑 葾 茒 茗 茤 蕵 蔡 莑 蓬 茖 苳 葻 芢 藇 葮 蒨 虋 蓃 蕮 萖 萸 茌 茊 龿 荷 茠 莚 苻 茯 茷 苩 葟 蔦 蒠 葩 葲 萆 菂 藠 蔸 蒐 蘤 藥 薂 葠 薬 蒒 蘬 薛 蘖 孽 躠 糵 萭 葔 莵 蔥 蓖 薁 芿 藵 葆 茽 苮 莜 蓧 蓨 蓚 荏 莋 花 蒊 葰 萑 劐 蒦 舊 蕉 莅 蓓 茚 芪 茋 茆 蒥 藰 蘏 薿 蘔 芹 茩 菦 蒑 蒰 荇 蓗 葎 蓰 藢 薇 蓹 蘌 蕧 蘅 蓯 蒣 葕 蓏 苽 蕦 蕏 莸 获 莥 蕕 荻 鷋 蘞 蘝 剳 蔱 莃 蔹 棻 苅 葼 蕃 苸 鴱 莝 蓌 遳 葅 䔢 苁 萲 菜 莩 薍 蘨 蔿 蓞 蒵 荽 薶 藐 𫉁 蕣 薆 艾 荃 菳 荼 荟 荅 葊 蘥 薟 薈 萮 菕 茶 莶 苍 芬 葐 苶 芥 芲 蓊 蒼 芩 莟 苓 菍 荭 莼 荮 蕴 药 芗 薌 苭 茲 孶 葒 蒓 葤 藴 蘰 蘊 蒳 葯 蕝 蘕 蔠 藧 蒶 蕬 苔 葈 荾 蔘 菇 薅 茹 蒘 蕠 䕅 葌 菑 䓂 藷 藹 蔎 蘐 虊 芳 葹 蔙 蔟 菸 蓑 蘘 蒿 藁 藳 藃 葶 薧 苄 芒 荒 莣 蓆 蔗 蔴 蘑 蘼 藦 䕷 蓭 蓎 菮 薦 蔍 薼 蘪 藨 苀 菧 蓙 蒺 藱 蔉 蓠 蘺 薕 萃 茭 蓘 萒 芠 荠 萕 荄 蕹 蓄 茺 苙 莘 藽 薪 菩 萻 蔁 蕫 薏 蔀 蘢 藙 菨 蒟 蔐 藡 虀 薺 蔏 蒂 蒡 莨 蓈 蓢 芦 䓞 蔰 菺 萹 蔼 莹 蒄 氋 鹲 鸏 蒙 茔 葷 蒏 荣 荤 劳 茕 蓂 营 萤 荥 荦 䓨 莺 蒬 蒮 蓥 萦 荧 芝 蓤 荘 蒋 茨 薋 蔺 苾 芯 蕊 蘂 𧄜 亚 蒫 垩 葁 蓔 荓 菤 蒹 晋 戬 鄑 葥 蘱 薮 蒾 蒌 蒴 严 恶 蒍 蕲 莌 虌 蔽 薠 蔊 蕿 藀 菼 苂 苎 藼 藆 荢 萗 莞 蔻 蔲 萣 萱 蔩 薲 苧 菪 藔 茡 萓 菅 菀 藛 蓿 葖  藭 蓉 茓 荌 藌 蔤 薴 蔳 菃 蕖 茳 蔆 薄 蘫 菏 薸 藫 蒲 葓 莯 萍 葏 蓡 薓 荡 范 菬 菠 蔢 蔋 鿊 菹 蕩 蘯 蕰 蕅 藻 薀 莎 萿 莈 蒅 萢 落 萡 蒞 蒎 藩 虃 蒤 𫈰 蕍 菭 薻 薃 茫 蓅 蒗 莐 蓱 蘹 丏 朮 怷 槥 櫘 框 樲 楔 梼 梆 棒 楱 椿 榛 樁 桟 杆 枉 梇 樍 棈 榡 栻 構 枺 杇 杅 柡 标 隸 歀 枅 械 杬 櫕 槻 枎 枟 栈 棲 柜 桋 杤 翉 杠 杜 榧 棖 桂 榪 橈 檮 柾 樾 桔 槓 榬 檯 橲 樹 櫝 橨 椏 栲 枿 楮 栳 榰 槸 棱 榼 梽 橽 桓 槤 槫 橞 棟 榑 梗 椻 棫 橿 櫃 梧 楅 樞 槅 槽 栕 樫 檻 欖 楋 櫴 樕 梀 欜 柯 梪 標 檦 櫏 橝 檟 槚 楆 樮 栖 梄 槱 欐 楝 杮 栜 柄 椟 枝 桏 榸 柑 栮 欇 楳 棋 椹 樭 櫀 棷 椰 檉 橫 樺 棤 槿 櫣 横 櫙 橵 樠 榵 楛 枻 楪 橊 楉 欌 栱 檋 枯 植 槙 橶 檊 櫹 櫮 楜 橭 栉 楠 模 欗 橗 權 欟 楧 櫗 槆 㯳 檧 櫒 樥 椛 檴 欍 櫵 榙 檬 桠 榗 欂 枾 樷 檚 辳 楚 郴 彬 檣 棶 棼 棽 椘 焚 林 禁 埜 梺 楂 榃 梵 梦 檒 婪 麓 棾 桲 樯 梿 枑 杶 枒 栋 橬 朽 枇 梐 楷 朾 材 村 梂 桭 槈 櫉 楕 橱 椷 櫔 楲 枙 枥 栵 柩 柭 槭 桺 柘 栢 榎 櫌 槗 栯 柨 栭 栫 杯 柸 桮 㮎 杌 栊 櫪 榞 椓 槬 椅 檷 枢 橛 樉 梜 杕 杖 桍 楏 檶 枤 橑 桎 椡 桱 樗 橒 欛 檽 樰 檑 櫺 欞 枰 梾 桡 棧 杙 楗 樳 桪 榋 橚 根 概 櫭 楖 椂 棣 桾 梫 棂 椵 橄 杛 柫 榒 杞 梞 榐 椐 楃 梮 樼 檘 欘 樨 榍 梶 柅 杻 橻 椲 杷 楣 杩 槢 櫂 樛 桗 楹 杨 梛 柌 杝 朷 朸 栛 枷 柖 杒 梕 栩 楈 杍 槂 極 櫇 柀 树 杼 柕 楙 楺 壄 懋 櫲 橘 槡 棳 桶 樋 楑 橙 櫈 橃 权 柽 杈 樄 橢 椭 榌 棑 桛 椒 栌 樝 㯭 櫨 櫖 椃 榩 杫 檅 枮 棹 槕 楨 桢 樐 橴 柦 柤 相 桿 棏 椇 桯 榯 欋 欔 樶 棵 檙 棍 楊 鸉 梘 梖 櫻 想 榻 皶 柙 柛 梩 椢 椙 橸 樓 櫢 榅 槾 椚 橍 欄 橺 櫚 橌 櫩 櫊 楫 檝 榥 枵 楬 栧 枴 柺 柚 梬 椳 樻 櫑 欙 楐 樏 楒 梠 檲 欕 槶 梙 榀 樿 橾 槵 梋 欁 檂 椣 棝 梱 柷 枳 栶 柍 楇 檛 榾 檡 檈 檌 椤 欏 楞 鿝 棞 柶 枧 𪱷 榲 樱 枏 桐 柟 柵  枘 棡 棢 槛 榄 檏 樸 欉 杣 榿 椯 桤 槯 欈 梤 梣 杪 朴 桄 档 梢 樘 橖 橕 檔 欓 𣗋 椽 欚 樌 栂 梉 柮 朻 札 蚻 紮 杵 栍 橅 鬱 株 枆 橇 杽 権 椥 柣 棅 杚 柂 杄 柞 梃 梏 棰 欑 椱 櫄 栝 梸 楸 柇 楿 梅 枨 杔 栴 枡 枖 枚 橋 桥 櫡 檱 櫛 橁 樦 櫤 极 杸 机 朹 枠 杋 枂 棴 棚 橳 椆 枹 枸 栒 栅 楤 构 杓 枬 枃 椈 桅 檐 棦 栬 欃 橹 櫓 櫯 梚 橡 桷 檞 槲 杴 桝 榤 栁 桞 栘 橪 杦 桻 槰 栙 格 柊 楓 枫 櫸 欅 椴 桕 檓 棿 楰 梹 楩 梴 柎 栿 栰 柏 楻 槝 樢 槔 橰 櫋 橷 棉 櫷 楾 椑 𣘛 梍 梎 槪 槐 櫆 櫟 檄 槹 檪 桘 槌 楀 梻 桖 樬 榭 杊 棩 椺 樤 樇 栣 杹 桦 椎 榫 槜 檇 欆 樵 栎 柹 桰 棔 柢 枊 柳 橮 榴 朼 栺 槇 梔 栀 栃 析 椞 晳 楯 蜤 皙 櫍 柝 惁 板 桁 榹 樅 椼 枛 柧 杉 梑 巫 檭 嗇 樧 榝 桸 柉 覡 觋 桃 鹀 鵐 椶 厀 橎 櫼 樊 礬 蠜 攀 鐢 燓 棥 欝 欎 鬰 顂 猌 憖 勑 愸 郲 憗 麩 麫 麮 麱 麪 麳 麵 麬 麷 麲 麯 麨 麧 麭 麴 䴸 麰 麶 𪍑 鶆 逨 枞 來 賚 麥 賫 赍 楥 檼 棌 桴 榣 櫾 槄 榽 桵 橓 朳 朲 杁 栓 梌 桧 椧 檢 検 檜 榆 楡 棆 枍 检 枪 枌 椕 柗 梲 桼 枩 松 棇 檎 槍 枔 梒 柃 棯 橼 柪 機 檵 櫞 檰 桳 椮 枱 桙 梭 槮 樔 椔 桚 櫧 柱 枋 堏 檹 椸 棜 榱 梈 椁 槨 橔 欀 槁 椋 楟 檺 檩 檀 檁 櫰 柿 杧 桩 櫥 櫎 樜 槦 榶 槺 椩 樚 櫦 杭 橠 櫠 棭 𣐿 榳 椨 槉 樆 椊 校 核 槒 棛 梳 橀 柆 梓 榇 櫬 棓 樟 橦 槞 樈 檍 樴 櫳 楌 椄 樀 櫅 楴 榜 桹 榔 樃 枦 棙 槴 楄 椖 槠 栐 楎 榠 榊 榷 枕 棎 栤 栨 榈 柲 榓 杺 栏 样 橏 槎 柈 様 檥 樣 檨 榚 栟 㮸 栚 棬 椦 槏 楢 樽 橂 椾 椪 橉 楼 檤 檖 榏 梯 椫 棁 橧 檆 橯 橩 櫿 棪 栦 枓 述 鶐 櫶 棕 梡 椗 楦 檳 柠 榢 槣 榁 椬 棺 椀 檫 楁 槟 樎 𣙜 柁 椌 榨 榕 柼 桉 榟 櫁 樒 檸 橣 樑 桫 榉 桜 木 本 柰 杢 森 朰 李 杏 杳 查 査 楍 𧉓 螙 桽 术 怸 杰 下 辻 乤 孛 𩓐 勃 愂 郣 鹁 鵓 疐 索 裘 啬 丧 颪 忑 匚 匸 车 轰 连 互 㐄 匨 辏 轩 轼 转 辕 辐 轲 辅 辆 辄 轱 𫐘 轭 轪 轾 辗 轺 轫 轻 辍 轳 辊 辒 辑 轴 轵 辋 𨐈 轧 轶 轿 轨 软 辂 轹 斩 堑 椠 暂 錾 辀 轷 辁 输 轮 轸 辎 辌 辘 较 辙 辚 辖 𫐑 匩 頓 顿 邨 屯 𡉫 旾 迍 牙 邪 鸦 鴉 雅 东 迓 鸫 兓 鬵 朁 蠶 旡 兂 㤅 炁 丂 与 欤 攷 夨 頃 顷 瓦 瓧 瓲 瓸 甅 邷 瓼 瓱 瓩 瓪 瓰 切 袃 比 毕 坒 枈 毙 毞 皆 勓 鶛 毖 粊 戉 七 丁 頂 顶 邒 扌 拝 揳 挷 捧 揍 搸 摏 𢷬 扞 抂 挵 掅 拭 搆 抹 抺 扝 抟 扜 抚 抏 攆 撵 攅 摫 扶 掭 抎 捷 捿 拒 挗 扛 扗 掁 挂 撓 掛 持 擣 拮 摃 擷 撷 擡 掗 拷 擮 捇 㧯 搘 掕 抾 搕 撎 撻 捙 搟 摲 摙 摶 搏 挭 揠 掝 捂 揊 摳 搹 挋 摼 㩜 攬 揦 攋 摗 捒 攮 抲 摽 搮 撢 拪 攦 揀 捕 掚 拺 抦 技 拑 挕 攝 摄 掑 揕 撕 摂 掫 揶 撶 擆 措 擹 攤 撗 撒 搑 擛 抴 揲 掿 拱 搷 攧 撠 擀 𢸳 揇 擜 摸 擖 描 擏 攃 擭 搭 搽 捞 挜 搢 揸 挬 拣 扽 捓 撍 批 揩 打 捄 挝 振 搙 捱 撼 揻 搣 扼 挒 抜 拔 摵 拓 擫 擾 揼 抪 拵 摕 抔 抷 𢱉 扤 拋 拢 扰 攊 摦 掎 擟 抠 撅 拻 摤 挾 挞 扙 挎 捺 捹 撦 掩 撩 挃 捯 挳 摴 擩 擂 攉 抨 挟 擓 挠 找 扫 揵 撏 挦 㩋 𪮋 拫 摡 揤 捸 捃 掃 撖 摾 拂 搦 抿 撰 搌 据 握 挶 擗 摨 掘 捤 抳 搱 摒 択 抉 扭 把 摺 擢 摎 扔 挅 扬 挪 报 扡 扐 拹 搚 拁 招 扨 挧 揟 掹 拯 搎 披 抒 揉 搡 掇  捅 摊 揆 撜 撥 择 掻 扠 搔 撱 扟 排 挊 拤 掓 㨗 據 掳 摣 擄 攎 攄 㨿 摢 摅 揹 扯 掯 捗 拈 掉 揁 扣 抇 担 抯 捍 挰 捏 提 攫 撮 捰 捑 掍 揚 挸 攖 搨 押 抻 捚 掴 摟 擻 揾 摱 捫 撋 攔 撊 擱 捜 揖 擑 㨪 擝 掲 掦 揭 撔 拽 挹 拐 捌 抽 揋 撌 攂 撂 捉 摞 揌 捛 損 摑 撣 操 损 捐 擃 捵 捆 拀 抧 摁 抰 撾 搰 攌 摆 擇 擐 擉 攞 擺 搵 撄 挏 抩  抐 掆 㨫 揽 擈 撲 揣 摧 㩗 攜 抄 挘 毮 扑 挄 挡 捎 摚 撐 擋 攩 撑 掾 攭 摜 掼 拇 摪 拙 拨 拟 扎 紥 揿 撫 撬 抙 抶 扢 拖 逰 扦 拃 挺 捁 捶 攢 攒 摥 挿 揰 括 揷 插 揪 捼 挴 托 扥 抍 扷 撟 挢 㩐 擌 擳 攥 撘 擶 扱 挆 投 扏 抛 抈 拥 掤 㨄 抱 拘 搊 掏 揔 抅 扚 揈 抣 捣 掬 擔 挣 攙 撸 擼 挽 搀 换 換 捔 掐 扻 搩 拸 撚 摖 搖 捀 摓 挌 揝 拠 执 垫 势 蛰 贽 挚 鸷 絷 热 攑 攪 扸 揑 搜 掜 拞 捳 捠 挻 拊 拍 揘 搝 搗 擤 摀 捭 擽 撽 搥 摠 擙 拰 推 携 擕 㩦  撨 㧰 扺 𢬸 捪 抵 抑 指 擬 折 埑 梊 硩 乴 哲 晢 揗 踅 蜇 掀 銴 娎 拆 誓 裚 逝 悊 烲 焎 搬 鋬 扳 擨 搋 摐 抓 挀 撳 摋 抸 挑 播 挫 攕 揺 援 採 捋 掙 捊 摇 撝 搯 挼 授 扒 扖 拴 捨 捦 捈 拾 揜 掵 撿 揄 掄 捡 抢 扮 挩 扴 抡 抮 捴 擒 摿 搶 扲 拎 搇 捻 扵 抝 拗 撧 払 拚 撪 𢮥 掺 抬 挨 抁 捘 撡 摻 摷 擸 拶 拄 揓 撴 攘 搞 掠 揨 擅 抃 攍 扩 擴 摭 攠 擵 搪 掶 摝 𢹲 攟 攈 攗 抗 掂 掖 挔 捬 掋 拡 摛 攡 捽 挍 抆 挤 擁 搐 撁 摔 撤 拉 鿜 掊 揞 撞 摬 攏 摌 接 摘 擿 擠 揥 搒 护 捩 搧 掮 揙 揮 挥 搉 抌 探 扪 搁 抋 拦 搓 撯 攁 拌 拼 掷 捲 搼 搛 揂 撙 擲 揃 掽 擞 撛 搂 搠 搤 挮 㧑 掸 捝 搃 撇 撈 攚 掞 抖 搳 攇 㩟 攓 攐 捖 掟 揎 擯 拧 捾 挓 抭 捥 擦 揢 摈 摍 拕 控 揬 挖 撺 搾 攛 攨 搲 搈 摉 按 擰  挱 搄 揯 撹 搅 才 鼒 朩 寸 皳 救 慦 㐜 逑 求 盚 刌 过 丆 厂  厈 厫 鄏 敐 辰 辱 唇 蜃 脣 医 醫 殹 瑿 毉 翳 瞖 贀 黳 鹥 鷖 繄 嫛 悘 厉 励 圧 左 厓 㕑 毻 遀 压 厙 厨 咸 顑 觱 感 厮 厝 厪 厧 厲 勵 歴 暦 厯 厢 厍 厊 厅 厦 厖 厐 餍 厌 靥 厣 黡 魇 厔 威 匴 烕 戌 厩 頋 顾 厄 历 匫 匢 成 郕 盛 歹 殝 残 殱 殰 殪 殭 殐 㱩 殣 殜 殖 殑 殏 殩 殢 殎 殗 殌 殘 肂 殔 殛 殂 殟 殨 㱮  殞 殫 殒 殃 殬 列 鿞 劽 䴕  鮤 鴷 銐 姴 裂 迾 烮 烈 匛 殅 殊 殇 歼 殤 殀 殁 歿 殉 歾 殠 殦 殈 殙 死 歽 殲 殍 殮 殓 殄 餮 飱 殆 殧 殕 殚 殥 殯 殡 友 犮 盋 丌 廾 厞 戚 顣 蹙 慼 兏 在 丣 石 右 百 碶 奡 戛 矸 硦 磝 磧 碛 碃 夒 碔 碡 砡 砞 砖 硏 夏 研 皕 硎 揅 頁 顨 厠 砆 厚 矼 厘 硅 碼 礟 礮 磽 硈 碽 礂 硣 硳 硓 碐 砝 䂶 磕 硨 饜 磚 磗 硬 礓 𥕢 䃘 礥 礛 砢 磦 磹 硒 檿 厭 壓 靨 厴 黶 擪 魘 嬮 懕 砸 碪 磡 礚 碏 礡 磺 礷 碟 硔 磌 礍 礶 碤 礣 礤 硴 砹 硭 礞 礴 㓦 礎 碄 硹 砵 碴 砗 砘 砑 砙 砌 砒 矴 磭 砺 碱 礪 砈 厬 磩 砳 碩 磊 硕 碝 矹 硥 礰 硺 碕 磢 硤 鿎 硽 䃎 硜 戞 礵 礝 礌 礭 鄾 憂 砰 硖 硗 碊 硉 硍 碌 碬 砩 䃉 碾 礔 碿 砄 码 磖 磟 砀 乭 劯 矷 破 硁 磉 硧 磴 唘 砋 砧 碵 硵 磠 砠 碍 碮 碭 硯 砷 磵 礀 碣 礘 鿬 碨 礧 磥 磒 礹 磾 𥖨 碘 硱 碢 磆 硘 礋 碅 砚 硐 𥐻 碙 礏 碋 磑 硸 碳 硙 磞 磪 磮 硶 矵 砂 硄 硝 礑 礃 砪 础 泵 砅 硃 矻 砤 砟 硞 硾 礸 矺 硪 礄 硚 砐 砓 矶 砕 矾 砽 硼 碉 砲 砃 硊 碀 确 砍 矽 磔 磜 䂫 硌 碸 砜 礖 碫 磶 硟 砶 碑 磈 礫 礉 磓 硇 磇 礇 碓 磼 礁 砾 碈 砥 磂 厑 礙 斫 厛 碷 礩 磤 磃 磫 砭 磻 硲 磘 磎 硂 碒 硢 砼 硆 礆 碖 硷 砏 砎 砛 砱 磯 碜 磣 碯 砫 䃠 礅 碻 碠 矿 礦 礳 磄 砊 硛 砿 𥕦 碎 磙 砇 硋 硫 砬 碚 礲 碲 磅 硠 砨 碥 確 砯 磰 磋 礢 礒 硑 磏 磸 碰 磷 磀 礈 磁 礠 䃅 磳 磱 礯 磍 碂 碇 碹 礗 硡 碗 䃰 碦 砣 硿 磲 靣 面 勔 靦 靧 蠠 䩄 靤 页 厕 冇 有 戫 郁 龓 迶 布 而 耐 耎 鸸 鴯 耏 耍 恧 存 卅 帶 遰 慸 不 丕 龨 歪 嫑 奀 邳 否 覔 盃 甭 鴀 厰 孬 还 臧 鴄 兀 兀 尢 尫 尪 尶 尷 豗 尮 尵 虺 尳 尴 匹 尰 尥 卼 尯 尨 龙 䶮  垄 聋 龚 砻 詟 袭 尬 尤 尲 厒 厏 厜 匠 厤 磿 歷 曆 厇 鳫 厡 原 願 厵 愿 鴈 贗 雁 贋 赝 厎 仄 厱 厷 翃 雄 豣 豜 豶 豮 豬 櫫 豷 豧 䝔 豘 豲 燹 豩 豤 豭 豝 豠 豱 豛 豞 豵 豨 豯 䝓 豥 豴 豟 逐 䝋 豕 蟸 甤 剢 豖 郀 刳 匏 鴮 瓠 綔 奲 奇 攲 敧 剞 欹 鵸 夶 厗 龎 䂖 剦 鹌 鵪 爾 璽 壐 覼 蠒 鸍 邇 区 瓯 殴 鸥 欧 鴎 橜 蹷 劂 厥 蟨 鷢 憠 灰 盔 頰 郟 鵊 鷞 爽 夾 飆 飙 达 牵 鹩 鷯 迖 迏 戍 大 丈 夳 夸 奈 夽 奆 夲 圶 套 奎 奔 奢 逩 奩 匳 匼 匬 耷 夺 奤 奁 夿 夯 奯 夻 奄 奛 奋 夵 奟 奝 奓 夰 夼 奞 奪 奮 奃 奅 厺 犬 太 猋 奒 盇 羍 昚 眘 尞 遼 冭 奫 态 戊 至 臻 臹 臶 臸 郅 到 致 臵 鵄 匥 晉 戩 巠 坙 逕 頸 勁 剄 鵛 巰 匟 匾 辷 霊 雩 鄠 雲 霕 靆 霴 靅 霼 靉 霒 霋 雸 霸 霰 霙 靀 霦 霖 霜 鹴 鸘 雬 雫 震 雳 雼 需 顬 颥 靂 雪 霞 霛 霨 霹 霫 雺 霱 霚 霧 霿 霯 霳 䬠 霏 靊 霷 霵 電 雷 霬 鿨 靐 靁 露 霣 霝 靈 酃 孁 龗 霻 雵 霄 雮 霆 霉 雭 霢 霡 霌 雹 雾 霓 霍 鸖 靍 靃 霤 霺 靎 雿 雽 霾 雰 零 霅 靄 雱 霩 雯 霁 雴 靇 霎 霠 霽 䨦 霭 霥 靏 靌 霈 霮 霟 霂 靋 霐 霑 霘 霪 霗 霔 霶 霃 忒 平 慭 来 赉 頬 颊 郏 刾 夹 亊 灭 匯 尧 翘 戈 戔 虦 盞 剗 划 弋 貣 鸢 鳶 隿 彐 聿 衋 建 書 晝 畫 劃 畵 尋 彠 鄩 寻 彟 肀 賮 盡 帇 肅 歗 鷫 肃 鹔 粛 退 艮 垦 恳 既 塈 槩 㮣 暨 鱀 即 堲 䳭 鵖 剥 逯 逮 录 隶 盝 尹 夛 君 頵 郡 覠 帬 鵘 裠 羣 群 焄 彚 帚 彛 彞 灵 遐 叚 叏 聼 饏 敢 憨 弓 弖 弙 弡 張 彊 彁 彄 弫 弻 疆 弭 彉 弽 弬 弼 彌 瓕 弳 彇 弜 㢲 弝 弛 弨 弪 引 弔 彏 彃 彈 强 勥 犟 謽 弲 彋 㢴 盄 弰 弢 矤 张 弸 弥 弞 弗 弣 費 鄪 费 刜 艴 弤 弧 弘 強 弴 弶 彍 弦 婱 弱 鶸 彅 粥 鬻 弹 弾 民 昬 敯 蟁 刡 敃 暋 睯 愍 鴖 邔 攺 改 妀 巳 已 己 导 异 巽 選 巺 忌 鵋 尸 尉 螱 犚 褽 慰 熨 叞 层 屆 屠 鷵 屚 屉 屟 展 殿 壂 臀 臋 居 剧 鶋 杘 屁 㞗 屒 屍 㞘 屋 剭 㞎 局 孱 屙 屝 𡰪 屓 屭 屢 屇 届 屌 辟 璧 壁 檗 甓 礕 劈 孹 鼊 躄 臂 幦 擘 䴙 鷿 鸊 鐾 繴 嬖 譬 襞 避 憵 糪 屃 刷 屬 劚 斸 犀 遲 屑 屫 屈 鶌 尿 尾 屗 屘 㞙 屛 凥 尻 鸤 鳲 属 㔉 尼 迡 屐 屜 屧 屣 屨 履 屩 㞞 屦 𪨊 屖 遟 迉 刔 遅 羼 屏 屎 屡 鴂 層 迟 屪 屄 尺 夬 昼 咫 尽 书 丑 韋 韝 韎 韔 韥 韢 韡 韚 韘 韛 韤 韍 韌 韖 郼 韠 韞 韣 韒 韟 韜 韐 韕 違 韗 臦 臩 燛 巴 巼 岊 眉 郿 鹛 鶥 舝 马 骉 骠 骊 骐 骤 骑 驱 𫘭 驮 骦 骁 骕 骎 骣 驰 骙 驭 驿 骚 骥 驲 驵 骒 骋 骡 䯄 骃 驶 驷 骄 驹 驺 骆 驸 骢 驯 骅 骓 骝 驳 验 骖 骀 骏 驻 骧 骇 骍 驴 骟 骗 骈 骔 驼 翇 羿 翜 翨 翼 毣 翆 習 翫 飁 翟 戳 鸐 顟 戮 勠 鄝 剹 鹨 鷚 雡 翏 翯 翠 翌 翣 翬 翚 卍 乃 呄 刴 朶 孕 夃 盈 戤 鼐 盁 尕 辸 廴 乙 乪 氹 那 司 孠 覗 䛐 刁 卩 卫 也 乸 迆 卪 㔾 乜 刀 力 刕 劦 勰 脋 脅 姭 召 加 駕 哿 架 巶 驾 乫 卲 劭 邵 綤 賀 贺 刟 毠 欩 鴐 嗧 妿 袈 迢 迦 劜 鳭 刃 丒 辺 边 歰 刅 办 忍 刄 习 羽 羾 翴 翄 頨 𦐌 翍 翀 翐 翑 翵 翭 翪 翂 翞 翋 乛 戼 疎 疏 疋 疍 蛋 胥 了 子 孒 承 孨 孴 孟 勐 孞 氶 丞 巹 卺 脀 烝 孑 孲 孺 孻 孖 孭 孾 孔 孙 逊 孜 孢 㝃 孤 孫 遜 愻 孡 孩 孮 叾 亟 凾 焏 辽 函 顄 孓 皯 頗 颇 皰 龾 皹 皮 龾 龴 𢀖 迳 頚 颈 劲 刭 巯 对 怼 戏 艰 劝 予 預 预 矛 矠 鶔 柔 豫 矡 蟊 矞 劀 氄 鹬 鷸 遹 矟 楘 鍪 敄 堥 騖 鞪 骛 暓 瞀 蝥 嵍 鹜 鶩 婺 愗 務 奦 熃 矜 矝 顙 颡 桑 歠 敠 剟 毲 敪 欼 鵽 逫 叕 叠 叒 双 邓 覌 勇 恿 观 圅 甬 勈 通 鸡 欢 鳮 难 戣 鄈 鄧 覴 癶 癷 発 癸 登 凳 邆 發 癹 买 又 圣 叉 蚤 阝 陦 隞 陚 陆 际 阱 阮 陿 隢 隯 阷 陡 隫 陼 陸 陵 阹 陣 塦 敶 陳 螴 隁 隔 阿 娿 陻 陠 陃 陋 陬 阵 陈 阰 陛 階 陙 隓 隋 墮 嶞 隳 隨 隇 阨 陌 陏 堕 随 陑 陾 阫 阢 陇 陭 隬 陜 陝 陓 陘 隭 陕 限 隦 阤 阞 陂 陉 隥 阠 陫 隵 阯 陟 騭 骘 阽 阳 阻 陧 隄 陽 隅 隰 隈 隤 隕 陨 隑 隙 隲 𨻶 陗 隚 墬 阥 陎 阣 陁 阡 阼 陲 隀 阩 陞 陹 阴 陶 陱 陒 隐 陥 陷 陊 際 降 隆 鿧 隉 附 隍 隝 隖 陴 隗 隩 陮 阺 𨻧 阪 檃 隱 櫽 隠 队 除 坠 隂 險 険 隃 陯 险 阶 陰 阾 阭 陖 隟 防 埅 䧡 阬 陔 陪 隌 障 隴 隡 隮 阸 隒 隣 鐆 隧 隊 墜 隘 阦 阧 院 陀 丮 卂 厾 蝨 鳵 迅 虱 飞 飛 飝 〡 丨 〦 丄 上 〧 〨 非 韭 輩 棐 辈 奜 猆 翡 蜚 豐 豔 豓 酆 艷 豒 剕 靟 餥 婓 裴 斐 悲 鬥 鬪 鬨 鬫 鬭 鬩 鬮 鬬 鬧 鬦 錖 裻 督 卡 尗 叔 惄 敊 仧 忐 卢 颅 鸬 虍 鬳 甗 獻 齾 戲 覻 虨 虐 勮 劇 遽 豦 虏 虘 鸆 虞 皻 覰 虜 盧 顱 鸕 膚 慮 勴 虛 戱 虡 戯 覷 觑 歔 虥 虤 贙 覤 虪 虎 甝 虝 彪 䖏  處 虗 雐 虧 虖 歑 虔 虙 虑 虚 攴 邶 北 丠 軰 冀 背 鄁 止 卝 芈 歲 顪 翽 劌 歳 歮 歨 肯 步 頻 顰 频 颦 歩 茍 辪 雈 歬 齿 龉 𫜬 龈 龌 龆 龇 龃 龊 龁 龅 龋 龀 龂 龄 齒 䶧 齬 䶗 齱 齰 齛 齻 齼 齽 齖 齮 齦 齷 䶕 齠 齜 齟 齵 齥 齪 齶 齫 齞 齓 齕 齚 齙 齣 齺 齨 齯 齲 齔 齗 齭 齘 齡 齝 齩 齴 齳 齸 歯 齢 占 卓 鵫 桌 逴 鼑 貞 遉 頕 奌 战 梷 敁 覘 觇 頥 乩 迠 点 卣 逌 卨 卥 贞 卤 禼 鹾 㮚 鹵 鹹 鹼 鹸 鹶 鹷 䴚 鹺 鹻 凸 欳 歵 歫 歭 歧 雌 頉 歱 此 些 祡 柴 砦 呰 眥 貲 歶 啙 赀 胔 鮆 觜 鴜 鈭 飺 紫 姕 訾 羋 歺 餐 粲 韰 豳 龰 叡 壑 睿 壡 肻 敹 囗 口 日 曰 旦 且 目 盽 眶 睶 盰 暳 瞔 睛 眜 眛 盱 眎 盶 瞡 暙 眃 睫 眱 旱 旰 旺 嘒 嚖 眭 眐 瞦 睵 晴 哐 睹 睦 睖 瞌 䁪 瞘 瞟 瞫 矖 喫 囓 噄 眪 眲 瞱 㪋 瞞 瞒 瞸 睰 暱 䀦 瞋 瞙 瞄 矔 矒 矆 矇 眄 睞 昩 昧 𥇢 盹 眓 盯 旴 縣 懸 㝵 睚 矋 眬 具 眍 鿃 郹  䴗 鶪 昊 唪 睳 嗪 狊 瞭 昙 眰 矐 睐 睷 眼 睩 睱 瞰 昛 煚 眠 矚 瞩 眤 𥄨 睸 矅 眧 瞲 睽 瞪 早 旪 呈 圼 噖 晆 曉 時 哢 嗷 嚽 矑 昰 嘖 暿 啧 啨 晸 眦 暁 唛 暑 暏 是 韪 題 题 韙 尟 𫛸 鶗 匙 遈 嗉 逞 曀 晅 睅 瞁 睈 睼 瞐 瞿 戵 矍 氍 鸜 睍 鷪 愳 煛 瞾 眒 量 瞜 瞤 矙 瞷 瞯 暷 鼂 睲 睗 睤 瞶 瞆 晤 鼌 矂 瞣 睊 曧 睓 睏 眖 眏 曋 晒 曬 暕 晡 眮 昁 昺 昞 昻 昮 郢 朂 最 畢 曅 曄 鷝 暵 曣 曂 暪 晎 暴 謈 暔 暯 暎 曔 曚 瞨 晽 顆 颗 敤 眇 夥 褁 晰 果 杲 味 睄 瞠 矘 旽 県 郻 鼎 鹍 鵾 昆 吁 晣 呩 时 瞴 鷐 晨 眊 眣 盵 睡 矄 曞 瞅 矁 睋 眀 睭 眗 眴 昜 敭 逿 盷 晟 晠 瞻 睁 睌 矎 眳 眵 咞 瞍 睨 瞗 暊 矏 睥 矈 睺 㬉 睢 瞧 眂 睧 眡 覞 覹 𥉳 見 呒 覎 昽 覐 盺 瞃 眅 矀 瞛 眽 昃 貝 賰 賎 䝼 賦 購 貦 賊 蠈 賬 賳 贖 賭 賻 贉 贜 贎 財 賕 賑 賄 睎 贓 贆 戝 賤 贐 賿 貤 貱 眨 郥 眺 貼 賏 甖 贔 罌 贁 鸎 鑍 嬰 鸚 譻 賵 賜 賗 贃 賟 貺 贌 則 贘 貹 敗 賙 賯 贍 賂 鵙 賉 貾 販 睉 貶 賖 賒 賶 貽 賐 贂 賍 賘 貥 賥 賋 賅 賠 贚 賱 賝 賆 賺 睬 賹 睜 贈 賧 瞬 瞹 賩 貯 吴 旲 呋 晇 瞼 瞺 睮 睔 盻 睑 盼 晻 昦 眕 瞈 暸 眑 矊 县 呍 晊 眙 眸 睃 悬 瞓 眆 盳 矌 瞊 瞝 睟 盿 眩 瞮 𥅻 瞕 瞳 矓 睙 眿 睴 瞑 曇 曘 曤 眈 𥆧 眻 眫 眹 睠 瞇 眯 瞵 䁖 睇 睒 瞎 睆 睻 瞚 矉 眝 睕 矃 晓 啑 啛 曃 暇 昲 曊 咦 曯 昵 暐 曜 旸 围 旫 昭 照 毾 遢 暌 助 刞 鴠 鴡 雎 甲 曱 叶 申 叿 吐 里 囯 暃 哇 嗎 嘵 啩 黒 嚋 曥 黙 野 墅 嘕 唗 咭 晫 嗊 㘆 嘻 嘭 唝 朄 圊 噴 喷 啞 噁 哮 嘋 啫 嘟 哧 嚇 咾 嗜 呿 嗑 国 噎 噠 啈 昌 昍 冒 咺 晘 勖 唓 囀 龧 曝 嗹 冔 毷 暘 晛 勗 晶 晿 曟 曐 曑 曡 暒 晹 暍 哽 暻 焸 暥 唔 曮 暺 嘔 𡂿 嗝 唖 嘈 晪 嚂 囕 喇 𠻳 嗽 婁 甊 氀 數 鷜 遱 囔 呵 映 哣 昷 嘌 曙 曎 鄤 曼 嘾 曪 喓 哂 唒 囇 畅 冐 門 閂 閆 閈 閏 閠 開 闚 閨 闖 闧 閸 闍 闔 闥 閳 閾 閜 闘 闉 闄 閪 闌 聞 閧 闀 闐 閑 鷴 閇 閕 閅 閉 閎 閹 猒 閛 闢 闈 闞 闋 問 間 闃 闅 閴 闝 闒 閘 閶 覸 闁 鷼 閺 闠 閭 闆 闡 閩 闦 閫 闤 閊 闓 哺 闛 闣 閖 閁 閐 閮 閒 覵 鷳  閻 閣 闏 閰 閥 闑 闎 閵 閽 閃  閿 閄 閤 闟 閱 閦 閝 關 闗 閞 誾 閍 閼 閙 閌 閔 閡 閚 闇 閬 闙 閟 悶 䦕 関 闂 闕 閲 焛 閗 閯 闊 晍 禺 顒 颙 遇 愚 咂 啢 唡 翈 吱 哋 咁 咠 咡 囁 嗫 唭 啿 嘶 戢 嘩 囈 唶 嘆 嚡 嘞 嚥 呭 喋 喏 哄 咕 嗔 嘲 暢 啚 鄙 呓 喃 嗼 囒 噧 囆 噶 喵 嚾 囌 嗬 嚄 嚿 哎 嗒 嗏 嚆 唠 显 哑 曗 顕 旵 暟 黽 鄳 畃 鸭 鴨 喖 啉 噤 㘄 唽 唻 嘜 呆 呠 喳 吓 迧 哱 嚏 嚔 嗦 晃 晄 曭 啭 昢 曓 噸 吨 呀 噆 号 號 饕 鸮 鴞 飸 咓 吡 哔 喈 电 叮 咑 啪 哳 啦 唞 吋 暣 旿 星 甠 戥 嗕 昳 咗 昨 啀 晧 喊 曛 晦 昇 喴 昅 旯 明 琞 盟 焽 曌 晭 昫 煦 呃 呖 易 昒 敡 剔 鶍 逷 惖 曷 毼 鹖 歇 鶡 遏 旳 昀 曕 冕 晚 晩 欥 𠯪 曻 咧 暩 晷 昸 囲 嘁 晲 咟 暞 嘎 嗄 暤 曍 喱 嚈 曒 嘠 嚘 暭 喕 哊 喐 咘 晑 晌 晔 吥 呸 暹 㗏 昂 昴 园 哤 咙 昕 嚦 昄 暰 暀 吰 啄 晞 晁 晀 呕 噘 咴 唊 哒 㬊 暖 暚 暧 曖 咵 喹 喯 昐 唵 昣 昖 暡 吠 呔 昑 晗 昤 嘹 曏 㬎 顯 歞 囩 咥 昪 晙 妟 昘 昉 暆 暶 暾 曩 暠 景 晾 顥 颢 影 旷 曠 昿 昗 晬 晈 旻 旼 晐 昡 㬚 昱 暗 暲 曈 曨 㫰 昈 昹 暈 暉 晕 晖 暝 嚅 嚯 暛 曦 呯 暽 晜 㷖 晱 炅 炚 晥 暄 曢 晼 晏 鷃 暅 𣈶 曳 哓 曵 㠯 噚 㖊 嚍 嘯 啸 嘨 哏 嘅 唧 吚 唚 噉 吲 咈 呡 噀 啹 喔 噼 唰 囑 啒 嘱 呢 呎 吷 吜 喡 邑 吧 吗 嚁 嘐 噿 哪 呞 叼 叩 吔 叧 另 叨 叻 嗋 咖 㗎 别 吇 吼 噊 嗓 啜 嗵 噔 叹 啊 唨 中 田 由 畴 啡 畊 畉 畦 畤 疇 疅 異 咔 甹 毘 毗 畏 甼 町 畀 畁 頔 畸 畎 盢 疁 廸 男 嬲 囐 嚱 噱 噳 嚧 噓 嘘 唬 嘑 畷 邮 囸 哶 噦 啃 嚬 啮 嚙 噛 呫 啅 畼 貴 遺 遣 畕 畾 壘 櫐 礨 壨 㽮 罍 鸓 纍 疊 㲲 疉 氎 園 贵 遗 胃 胄 冑 畘 踌 踳 蹖 蹟 跊 趶 趼 趺 践 踕 距 跠 跬 蹺 跱 躊 跿 踍 踷 踛 踜 踋 躂 蹥 踾 蹧 踈 跒 躚 蹮 跴 躧 跂 躡 蹑 躤 踑 踸 踙 踂 躇 踖 蹣 蹒 跇 蹀 蹃 跍 蹎 躪 躏 蹅 蹞 跸 蹰 跋 䠞 跖 蹛 踎 踦 躎 蹶 跶 跨 蹽 跮 踁 跷 踐 踺 蹆 跟 跽 蹍 踞 跼 躃 䠱 跜 趹 跁 躍 蹘 跥 跏 跛 蹂 蹫 踴 踊 蹬 蹳 䠊 踧 躆 趾 踄 跕 踔 跐 跙 踶 躣 躩 蹕 踝 踼 蹋 躝 躢 躙 踢 跩 蹪 踀 躁 踻 躅 蹼 䟖 踹 蹦 踃 䠀 蹚 躀 蹡 踏 躌 跦 𨃅 踟 跌 趷 躦 躜 跣 踵 踿 踒 跹 踇 跃 蹻 趿 跺 跀 跑 跔 跚 趵 踘 跪 踭 跢 蹨 跭 路 鹭 鷺 跗 躒 躈 踽 踓 跞 蹓 呲 喍 嘴 踲 踬 躓 跅 蹏 蹝 蹤 跳 蹯 踨 踩 蹈 蹊 趴 跧 跲 蹹 踰 踚 跄 跈 蹌 趻 跉 踗 躖 跆 踆 躐 躞 跓 趽 蹾 躟 蹴 躕 踱 蹠 蹗 踮 躔 跡 踤 跤 跻 踣 蹱 躘 踥 蹢 躋 蹄 踉 蹁 蹐 蹉 跘 跰 踯 踡 蹲 躑 踫 蹸 躨 蹭 踪 踠 蹜 跎 蹿 躥 畽 畮 畋 𪽇 畇 畂 畧 略 鴫 甽 畈 畖 畟 足 畭 𤱝 界 畍 畛 累 圔 畯 㚻 甿 㽘 畩 畡 疃 迪 畳 塁 疂 思 顋 畔 圉 畻 疄 畹 吕 吅 呾 咀 哻 㘗 嗮 嘬 嗶 嚗 咢 顎 颚 卾 鄂 覨 鹗 鶚 遌 啺 哯 員 唄 勛 鄖 嚶 鶰 囎 呷 呻 哩 駡 嘢 噐 啯 唱 嚚 嘍 嗢  嚪 喁 團 槑 圑 呺 黾 嚴 喝 囂 嚻 嚣 哭 器 喅 唈 骂 哵 郘 國 爴 串 喂 嘳 喟 哫 品 圄 單 辴 戰 囅 鄲 鷤 鄵 劋 氉 喿 碞 嘓 㽞 嘼 鼉 獸 鼍 嘽 噪 喦 嵒 㖞 虽 雖 噥 唺 患 嘂 咒 丳 呪 呮 咽 嗯 咉 斝 遻 喌 喎 嗗 噮 嘪 嚃 噣 啰 囉 嚺 呬 员 呗 勋 郧 嘤 嘿 嚜 嚸 肙 瓹 剈 圃 鹃 鵑 哃 嗣 翤 吊 呥 呙 呐 剐 吶 虫 蚌 蜯 蝽 螓 虷 蚟 蜻 蝳 螦 虶 蚈 蚖 蚨 蜨 蚷 蛦 虹 蛙 螞 蟯 蛣 蟢 蟛 蟦 蝫 蠘 蛯 螧 蜐 蟽 蛼 螹 蟪 蝀 蝘 蜮 蝠 螎 螬 蝲 蚵 螵 蟫 蜅 蜽 蛃 蚑 蚶 蜞 蟖 蟶 蜡 螼 蟥 蟎 螨 蠂 蝶 蠎 蟒 蛄 蠨 蟏 蝴 蝻 蟆 蠇 䗶 蠸 蝧 蠴 蠛 蜹 䗖 蠖 蠓 蝾 蜥 蜙 蚞 虾 蚜 蚍 蜌 蝔 虰 蛷 蜄 蠮 蛎 蟵 蠣 蝛 蚅 蛚 蛂 䗩 蛨 蝢 蝒 蛕 蝡 螮 蚽 蛖 蚘 螈 蟩 蛺 蝰 蟟 蛭 蛵 蠕 蚲 蛱 蛲 蟳 蟰 螁 蛝 蝍 蝦 蚓 蟤 蜛 蠾 蚭 蚇 蚗 蚆 蝞 蚂 蠗 蟉 虵 虭 蛠 蛁 蛡 蝑 虸 蜢 蜬 蚾 蝚 蝃 蛹 蛏 蠦 蝆 蛅 蟕 蚎 蛆 蝭 蠷 蠼 蜾 蜫 蝪 蜆 蛽 蠳 蜈 蝈 蝐 蝿 螻 蝹 蟃 蠅 蜴 蝎 蠍 蚛 蚰 蠝 蝟 螺 蝇 蟈 蟬 蜎 蜗 蟲 蠱 蛐 蝸 螖 蛔 蛊 蜖 蠌 蠉 蠋 蜠 蚬 蟔 蚦 蚺 蚋 蛧 蝄 螘 蠵 蛳 虲 蛸 螳 蟷 蟐 蝝 虯 虬 蟱 蛛 蚝 蜘 蛈 虼 蜁 蚱 蜓 蝩 蝮 蛞 蜊 蟍 蝌 蜏 蜲 虴 蛾 蟜 䗻 虮 蚏 蜩 蚫 蚼 蜔 蜪 虳 蚒 蚐 蛫 蟾 蝜 蟓 蠏 蜭 蛥 蜂 蛒 螋 蜺 蝂 蚯 蜒 蚹 蚮 蟘 𫋌 蝗 螑 蟂 螅 螐 蛜 蜱 螝 螄 蝺 蟌 螕 䖮 蜵 螩 蜼 蟭 蚔 蚳 蚚 蚸 螔 䗥 蛌 蝬 蟠 蟋 蚥 蝯 蛶 蜉 蟡 螇 蜍 蛤 蝓 蜦 蚡 蛻 蚧 蚣 螉 蠄 螥 蚙 蛿 蛉 蚴 蟣 蛑 蠟 蠩 蛀 蚄 蝣 蜳 蠰 蝏 蠔 蟺 虻 䗈 蟅 螗 螰 蚢 螏 螭 蠊 蝷 蜶 蛟 蚊 蛴 蚿 蟀 蜟 蟑 蟙 蠬 蠐 螪 螃 蜋 螂 蜧 𧎥 蝙 螟 蠀 蛘 蟮 蜣 蟻 蛢 蜷 螊 蝤 蝼 螠 螆 蝉 蜕 蠑 蟧 蚁 蚪 螛 蝊 蝖 螾 蠙 䖳 蜿 蛇 螲 蟝 蝋 曲 豊 鄷 艶 豑 農 典 覥 觍 敟 固 盅 噗 嚉 嘊 啱 喘 嘣 哕 嗺 困 㗂 吵 卟 迚 忠 咣 嗩 唢 哨 嘡 噹 嚐 喙 呣 嗤 咄 囤 呉 吳 叫 团 団 吘 吽 哖 啣 嘸 嚹 咮 㗑 呹 吃 吀 咋 哠 唾 囋 喠 嚑 咶 喢 啝 唎 嚟 啾 咊 唀 唩 吒 哦 呏 呚 嘺 噬 囖 吸 哚 吺 叽 啁 咆 呴 咰 喣 別 呜 啕 吻 唿 哅 呁 鸣 噡 喼 嚵 噜 嚕 唤 喚 唃 嘝 啗 焁 吹 哆 嘫 咯 喒 咚 嗖 唲 哬 咻 唌 咐 𠲎 呂 咱 喤 嗅 嘄 鳴 唕 嚊 唣 嗥 嘷 嗚 咿 啤 啲 喞 嚛 噭 噑 喉 噢 囿 响 咃 嗰 吪 哗 喺 囨 唯 鷕 噍 呧 嚠 兄 叱 哛 听 哘 嗁 嘥 嘚 呱 哌 吆 圂 慁 唙 只 因 嘦 欭 唏 恩 咷 噃 呼 唑 㕮 唂 嗲 喛 啋 哷 哹 啂 嚼 嗂 噅 嗘 哸 嗳 噯 叭 㕥 叺 史 央 啥 唫 唋 哙 哈 啽 噏 噞 嗱 噲 喻 喩 呛 吩 盎 鸯 吤 鴦 嗡 噙 喰 嗆 吟 唅 嗿 呤 唸 哟 咝 吆 呦 嘰 嚩 喲 噝 咍 哞 唉 吮 唆 嘇 呶 𠴂 嗈 唁 嗾 唹 哼 啍 噋 𠺖 嚷 嗃 噈 嚎 喨 喥 嚝 嗻 嘛 嚰 嚤 嚒 嘃 吭 囄 啐 囃 咬 呅 哜 咳 噰 呟 唷 嚫 噺 喑 噇 噷 噫 嚨 喭 唼 嘀 嚌 啼 嗙 哴 啷 唳 呝 咏 喗 哝 唥  咇 吣 咩 嗟 唴 嗴 咲 啳 嗛 噂 咪 噒 喽 嗍 嗌 嗞 吖 啴 哾 噌 嘮 啖 吙 呌 嗐 噻 唍 啶 喧 𠳼 咛 哰 咤 啘 嚓 喀 咜 鿽 啌 鿽 噾 咹 嘧 嚀 啵 嘙 唦 嗨 囙 圕 㤙 囻 圍 冎 咼 旤 剮 歄 過 骨 骭 骬 髐 髆 骾 髒 骷 骵 䯝 髓 顝 髄 骻 骮 髎 骳 髗 骴 髁 髏 髃 體 髑 骰 骩 骪 骲 鹘 骼 骫 鶻 髀 骶 骺 骽 骱 髇 髍 骯 骹 骸 髈 髉 髊 骿 髅 髖 髋 髕 髂 髌 囝 甴 回 廻 圖 迴 圚 圓 圆 圛 圜 圐 罒 皿 囬 廽 逥 罣 罵 罫 罡 瞏 署 罢 罴 睪 斁 歝 鸅 罭 翾 鹮 䴉 還 睘 羈 羇 羁 罟 置 罱 羃 罧 罘 罽 罨 罠 罻 罞 罬 罪 罩 罝 罼 買 鷶 罳 罥 奰 眔 遝 蜀 斀 劅 歜 鸀 斣 罗 逻 眾 罶 罛 罦 罖 羄 羂 羅 鿡 邏 罷 羆 罺 詈 罸 罰 羉 罜 罯 罿 罚 罤 罾 罹 圌 囦 囷 囫 图 囮 四 见 觃 罓 贝 囚 龱  赋 贼 贱 赌 赙 赎 财 赇 赈 圙 贿 赆 婴 贴 囧 赗 赐 朙 赑 罂 鹦 则 账 败 赒 购 赡 赂 贩 羀 贬 赊 贻 圀 赃 赅 赔 赚 赠 㘥 赕 贮 囶 圇 囵 囹 囜 圗 囼 圎 囡 圁 圝 圞 囥 圏 圈 黑 墨 黠 黷 黫 黩 黚 黮 黰 黗 黖 黬 黤 默 黓 黸 點 黜 黣 黵 黟 黭 黔 黝 黪 黢 黲 黥 黯 黕 黦 図 凹 兕 冂 冃 冄 𨙻 同 戙 迵 囘 巾 円 冉 帱 帏 䎃 𨚗 幘 帻 帓 帳 幬 幊 幩 帾 幅 幖 帺 幉 幙 幭 幪 帄 帪 帗 帞 幁 帴 冋 㢠 幄 幈 迥 幃 帊 帔 冊 帖 幀 帧 刪 帼 帽 幔 㡌 幱 幌 幆 幜 幗 幝 幧 帜 幞 帩 幥 幠 帲 帙 帐 幯 帆 幨 帕 帿 幒 帷 㠶 幡 㒳 幍 帢 帉 幓 幮 幛 幢 幟 帹 㡓 幎 帎 帡 帨 幰 幏 帵 冈 内 冏 㕯 贶 刚 网 肉 內 禸 岡 剛 㒺 罔 〢 旧 児 坚 贤 肾 紧 竖 〣 临 监 览 鉴 业 彂 鄴 鸈 業 菐 丵 叢 對 懟 凿 鑿 糳 黹 黼 黻 黺 邺 山 亗 崋 嶤 崶 嶻 嶄 崬 岢 豈 顗 獃 敱 覬 剴 敳 凱 颽 崁 嵌 巈 巔 巅 嶘 崧 嵀 崭 岽 嶜 嵿 嶊 屵 岸 崖 嵅 嶏 嵗 崴 峛 岩 峟 耑 顓 颛 剬 歂 遄 嵟 嶳 嶡 炭 峚 輋 嶚 峎 嵹 岪 觊 剀 凯 岂 嶎 崫 岜 𢌚 屶 屴 岧 岃 嶐 巚 嵵 崑 崱 嶯 峀 嵔 崽 巖 嵓 崮 嶉 峝 岗 崗 嶪 岀 岿 巀 嶈 汖 埊 嵚 岝 峲 巍 嵙 崣 峩 岌 崩 剻 峞 岁 翙 刿 峯 峉 嵐 岚 嶌 嵬 巋 嶭 峳 崔 嶲 巂 酅 嶣 岇 峁 巓 嶷 嵂 嶶 嵸 嶽 嶔 嵏 𪁏 嶺 峑 崟 峇 𡽗 嵛 崙 𡸃 峜 岕 嵡 岑 岺 嵾 訔 崺 峕 嵩 巐 㠇 崒 岦 峷 嵜 巃 崀 辿 嵳 崇 巌 屽 崝 岍 岏 崨 岠 峓 屸 嶢 峙 嶹 峔 崚 峘 嶃 崠 峺 峿 嶇 嶆 崾 峬 岐 嵁 岵 嵮 嶱 巏 嵘 崂 崊 崍 嵖 岈 峫 屿 㟁 崕 巁 峸 峢 巎 崸 峏 嵽 岯 屼 崎 岖 嶥 峽 崦 嶛 峌 嶀 嶿 岼 崃 峡 峣 峍 峮 嵶 岷 屺 崌 崛 嵋 嶍 嵺 屷 岹 屻 崡 岥 嶝 峄 邖 峠 巘 巇 岾 岨 崼 崐 崵 峴 巊 岬 嶁 嵎 嵑 岫 崿 巗 嶩 崓 岲 岟 嶧 嶵 岘 峒 嶫 屾 嵦 峭 㟂 乢 崉 屹 岞 峼 崜 巑 嵊 峨 岆 嶠 峤 岋 岄 岣 峋 岉 峗 嶦 峥 巉 嶑 崅 嶰 嵥 峰 峈 峂 嶼 岴 岶 崲 嵲 嶋 嵨 崥 嶕 崏 岻 嵧 岓 岅 崻 嵷 崤 嵕 嶓 峪 嵈 嶾 崢 嵠 崯 峆 嶖 嶮 崳 崘 崄 岎 嵢 岒 岭 岰 峅 峻 崰 崞 嵪 嵉 嵣 嵻 崪 峧 峐 嶂 﨑 巄 嵼 嵃 崹 嵭 嵴 嵯 嵄 嶬 嵰 崷 嶟 嶙 嵝 巙 巕 嵫 嶒 嶸 嶗 巆 峵 岮 崆 嵱 岤 峖 刂 师 归 帰 凣 帅 尘 尖 尜 覍 尙 尛 少 劣 省 雀 蠽 毟 尐 幽 卜 盀 耀 尡 輝 辉 光 黋 韑 兤 当 鳪 𧴪 虩 肖 削 揱 逍 尚 敞 幤 氅 龸 尝 坣 堂 甞 棠 牚 瓽 賞 當 劏 赏 黨 常 㦂 掌 党 嘗 裳 䬪 彑 彘 斲 剝 彔 劙 剶 鶨 彖 蠡 盠 彙 彜 彝 毌 貫 遦 贯 毋 母 毑 袰 凵 爿 壯 弉 奘 銺 娤 裝 焋 牁 牃 牆 牀 狀 戕 將 墏 醬 槳 奬 獎 螿 漿 斨 牄 妝 牅 牂 屮 旹 蚩 妛 出 祟 芔 糶 粜 䢺 欪 艸 茻 辥 櫱 孼 蠥 糱 雟 发 卐 丩 収 收 丱 乆 以 乚 亅 頮 颒 沀 凼 沝 水 坔 沯 呇 沓 畓 泴 淼 氼 濷 小 氺 丿 钅 锲 铸 锖 鿏 钰 钘 铏 钱 钜 针 钍 钲 钙 铐 锗 铑 镈 鿔 铻 镉 钷 钶 镖 镡 铺 钳 铒 镊  错 𨱑 锘 钴 镇 镆 锚 锳 镬 铓 铹 铔 钵 链 钝 铘 锴 钺 钉 铖 钹 铕 钸 钚 锜 镢 锛 钛 镣 铚 镭 铽 铼 铗 铙 键 银 锓 镪 镄 锯 锔 铌 钮 钯 镅 镠 钖 钇 钌 锰 铍 镫 铎 钗 锕 钻 钽 钼 锝 锃 䦆 锞 锟 锄 钾 锂 锠 镘 锡 钟 钿 铀 镙 锶 铝 锷 铞 锅 锢 铟 镮 镯 锣 钡 铡 铜 钢 钠 铿 镤 铠 镚 钊 钞 钋 铛 锁 销 镗 镋  钆 铢 铁 钎 铤 锆 锤 铣 铥 锺 铦 锸 锹 锈 锇 钑 铅 钒 钥 铇 钨 锪 钩 钓 钧 铮 铯 镵 镥 鿭 钦 铭 锋 铬 锻 锼 铂 锽 镍 锦 𫔇 钏 铧 锥 镌 铄 铆 镏 锧 锨 钣 钐 铩 铫 锉 锾 锊 铨 铪 镎 钤 铃 钕 铷 锱 镴 钫 镟 镞 镦 镶 镐 锿 铈 镀 镛 镳 钪 铱 镰 铰 铉 锍 铳 锌 锫 镜 镱 铲 镝 镑 锒 𨱍 锵 钔 锎 镧 锏 铋 镁 锩 𨱔 镨 镂 镒 镃 锑 锐 锬 钬 钭 锭 镓 镲 镔 铊 镩 镕 铵 铴 气 氰 氬 氭 氥 氞 氪 氩 氫 氯 氟 氖 氢 氜 氱 氠 氲 氤 氳 氝 氙 刏 氕 氡 氘 鿫 氚 気 氛 氦 忥 氧 氣 氮 氨 午 牛 玍 生 年 眚 啎 卸 欫 鵇 甧 制 掣 製 甥 甡 剰 乗 吿 橆 舞 無 甒 鄦 鷡 缶 缹 缸 罈 罐 缽 𦉆 缻 缺 缷 罏 罅 罎 䍉 罁 罉 罆 缼 缿 罀 缾 罇 犇 邾 鴸 朱 鼄 迕 覒 毛 毧 毢 氁 毬 毽 𣰇 毴 毡 毸 毜 毳 毨 毥 毱 氇 氌 毝 毺 毶 毪 㲱 氊 毰 氆 毩 毯 手 劧 掱 龵 拜 看 勧 観 歓 幷 甁 逬 搿 掰 矩 榘 短 矱 矧 劮 知 䵹 聟 智 鼅 矲 矮 矨 矯 矫 鴙 鴩 雉 矪 矬 迭 矰 矢 失 怣 秉 乞 刉 迄 㐌 迤 千 壬 乍 迮 怎 廷 頲 颋 告 頶 勂 郜 靠 鹄 鵠 造 垂 甀 郵 𣭡 酇 酂 兟 贊 劗 赞 先 选 丢 重 動 憅 勲 濌 复 熈 熏 勳 牜 牡 特 犢 牾 牱 牺 犊 犕 牯 犆 犡 牻 犄 牼 牫 犍 犌 牠 牞 牣 犋 犑 犦 牰 㹎 犤 牭 犅 牳 犔 牪 牲 牦 牿 犐 牧 犞 犓 物 鿯 惣 觕 牬 牴 牝 牷 犙 犣 牥 犉 犜 犒 牤 犥 牨 犃 犝 犏 犧 犠 犈 犪 犗 牸 乖 埀 剩 乘 舌 舔 甜 憇 頢 舓 舑 刮 舏 乱 舙 敌 鸹 舚 鴰 憩 舐 辞 适 舕 竹 臿 敮 歃 稧 秆 積 秣 秐 秬 穘 秲 秸 稏 稑 稜 穗 稉 稶 稢 穂 稫 穲 秿 秓 稘 稓 穔 穁 秙 稙 稹 穯 穫 穡 秫 穑 秕 稭 秡 稬 秠 嵆 嵇 稽 諬 穪 秷 穤 秤 穊 穉 秜 稺 稦 穋 頺 稰 秄 秛 穢 秥 和 租 稈 程 馩 穝 稞 馞 馛 馣 馢 馜 馡 馧 馤 馥 馟 馚 馠 馝 馦 馪 种 秞 穓 稩 稷 稆 穠 稒 稇 积 秵 秧 惒 稛 秱 穙 秈 秽 利 梨 鿠 犁 鿟 鋫 悡 秒 稍 秼 秏 秩 秨 穳 種 稪 秳 秝 秅 秗 穚 頽 颓 穨 鵚 稝 稠 棃 剓 睝 黧 犂 鯬 鵹 錅 黎 邌 稳 穐 穞 穭 称 移 穄 秇 穥 龝 穆 稗 秹 稚 穕 穛 秭 頹 秖 秪 稀 稯 黏 䵚 黐 穩 穏 稃 穱 稱 稲 稻 秂 稌 秴 稐 秎 稅 黍 秢 稔 穖 私  秮 稄 穇 瓾 覣 魏 犩 逶 稕 穰 稿 稤 穬 穅 穮 秔 穣 稡 稸 稖 穜 穧 稂 稨 秾 秘 秚 䅵 稴 穟 稵 稊 税 湬 鍫 秋 醔 甃 蝵 揫 鹙 鶖 媝 愁 科 穦 稼 秺 穃 禾 秀 透 季 香 馫 盉 秊 秃 穒 禿 委 稥 迁 忎 瀪 鳘 鰵 繁 慜 毎 每 勄 敏 緐 毓 长 乇 我 䖸 鹅 鵞 鵝 尓 圱 叐 升 刋 谸 〩 勪 敽 敿 鷮 鴁 攵 夭 呑 喬 䀉 岙 乔 𥁢 竺 篲 筐 筺 籍 筙 筹 箺 竿 筭 簀 箦 箐 篝 竽 筓 笄 笎 簮 篋 箧 笺 箑 笁 篚 筀 篤 篈 等 籌 籖 篶 篢 簙 籉 𥬯 箸 䇭 篕 範 簐 簵 篿 筪 簠 筻 䈅 籄 籃 籟 籁 簌 笸 笴 篻 籈 篥 簟 籭 箣 策 笻 筇 筑 築 篫 筠 箕 簸 簛 簊 箃 篏 簕 簧 笹 箬 簳 箶 籆 篐 簯 箖 箱 籕 筮 簭 遾 箂 笨 笌 簪 笓 筚 簼 箍 箝 簎 籒 筢 箨 筘 箉 籜 䈰 篺 籀 䇽 籡 箴 𥷑 筬 笼 篴 籋 筴 簝 箌 籗 籱 䇲 箋 筆 簫 箫 簘 簋 節 蠞 箓 笋 箒 䉲 第 𥮜 笰 篛 笢 簨 箼 簈 箳 笆 篃 笃 籊 笥 竾 竻 笤 笳 笾 篜 箛 筩 簦 篨 籧 籚 簴 箎 笘 笪 笡 筸 算 𥲻 篹 簒 纂 篡 籑 籰 篳 篎 箟 筧 筫 筽 筯 笚 簍 籔 籣 簡 簢 箿 篂 笛 箅 簣 篑 簬 筥 篔 簂 簞 筼 筁 箇 筃 簻 笝 笽 簚 篾 簤 箩 籮 箘 笕 箆 筒 笍 篮 篅 筛 箵 筜 筲 箾 簹 篆 笜 笖 篯 笙 笔 笶 笮 筳 筶 簉 箠 籫 筅 箽 筈 筣 簃 篍 笑 簥 笈 竼 笂 箙 筋 簲 籐 籘 簓 笣 笱 筍 箰 篘 笧 笏 笉 簷 筝 𥬞 篷 筿 笿 笗 籅 篟 簰 箯 筵 符 筏 笩 篁 籩 箄 篼 篩 篌 篦 筗 筱 篠 筰 篗 笫 笷 籎 筕 篪 箻 簁 篽 籞 篵 笊 笟 籛 籙 籦 籲 籢 籨 劄 箚 筄 籤 笅 籂 箏 筟 筌 筡 答 籥 簽 签 篒 篬 笒 筨 笭 籪 箹 笲 𥮾 笞 篸 笯 筎 簔 簱 籏 箷 簇 箊 簑 篙 籇 笇 笀 籯 籝 篖 簏 笐 䉬 𫂈 篱 籬 簾 箤 筊 笠 箁 篭 篰 籠 簅 鷑 篣 筤 簄 篇 簶 篧 简 箞 箭 簖 䉤 篓 箪 簩 簺 筦 簆 箮 筞 管 箢 箜 簿 篊 筂 笵 簗 箥 篞 簜 箲 箔 籓 箈 筷 及 頄 虓 鸠 鳩 剁 朵 殳 几 九 卆 㐤 杂 雑 㐡 叴 旮 旭 𤰚 厹 凡 丸 訄 馗 奿 勹 勻 月 肨 膩 腻 腠 肝 腈 脿 膆 肟  肼 朊 肤 脻 胰 肛 肚 脹 胿 膮 臌 膨 膹 胠 脚 膞 腖 膊 腷 膒 膈 臔 脨 胢 脰 膘 腰 脯 肺 脼 肢 腜 腊 臙 朑 臓 臟 腩 膜 臈 朠 臒 膵 朦 膝 脖 肫 胨 肶 肘 脙 脤 膸 胈 脜 腼 胹 腝 肧 胚 脴 胧 肬 肱 遯 豚 脄 脥 胯 腌 肰 肽 膫 胵 脛 臑 膤 臛 脦 胓 腱 腿 腵 膙 胇 腒 腛 脲 胒 肥 蜰 膠 臎 肠 肊 𫛳 鵩 服 肔 肋 脇 肕 胁 胫 腬 腏 膯 用 腓 胩 胪 臄 臚 胋 胆 脭 臞 腂 腸 脵 胛 胂 腘 膢 腽 膶 腢 腥 肿 腲 腗 膭 腮 腭 膕 臊 脶 膿 腆 胑 胭 胦 腡 膼 臅 膃 胴 肭 朒 腨 膗 刖 胱 膛 腞 胟 朏 甩 胜 脌 膴 膬 腁 胅 肐 胣 胙 脡 腄 臢 臜 膓 腫 腹 臐 脷 腇 脢 胀 股 肌 肍 朋 朤 鹏 鵬 胞 褜 朐 肳 脗 胸 肑 脆 膽 脃 脕 肷 膖 胮 胳 肒 腶 膄 腉 腴 脠 胕 胉 腺 脾 膇 膍 脽 臇 膲 胏 胝 脂 肵 腯 胻 胍 肜 脈 脎 脪 朓 朡 膰 脞 腳 脟 脬 膎 脮 脍 肸 臉 膾 腧 腀 肹 脸 朌 脫 胗 肣 朎 腍 膷 胎 朘 肗 臘 腦 肪 脝 朜 膻 脏 膅 膔 臕 肮 腋 腑 脑 臁 脺 胶 脐 胲 臃 胘 膟 腤 朣 臆 膱 朧 臍 腣 膪 膀 朖 迌 脉 腪 脓 膌 羘 膳 胖 胼 朕 塍 騰 榺 腾 腃 勝 膡 賸 螣 黱 幐 滕 䲢 鰧 縢 媵 謄 膁 脒 膦 膉 脱 朥 腅 肞 腙 脘 腚 臗 臏 腟 腕 膑 腔 膣 胺 脳 周 翢 郮 鵰 雕 彫 週 匐 匍 匒 匎 匉 匓 包 刨 炰 句 旬 郇 銞 迿 劬 邭 甸 敂 鸲 欨 够 鴝 雊 斪 芻 皺 鄒 鶵 雛 乌 邬 匋 勼 册 删 匇 匑 匔 匂 勿 曶 刎 甮 匆 忽 怱 勽 匃 匈 胷 匁 匌 勾 勺 丹 訇 雘 刐 匄 鴅 彤 匀 胐 胊 脁 肦 脧 膧 鸟 枭 鹱 鸵 𫛣 岛 凫 袅 匊 鵴 灳 厃 頠 危 矦 詹 甔 刍 皱 邹 争 煞 雏 急 色 負 亀 㲋 酁 毚 劖 龟 鱼 鲁 䲠  鲭 𫚉 鲑 鲒 鲼 鲓 鳍 鲮 鿵 鲠 鲾 鲄 鳔 鲡 鲯 鲰 鳓 鲽 鳠 鲢 鲀 𫚈 鳡 鲅 鲔 鲕 鱿 鳜 鳕 鲆 鲟 鲫 鲪 𫚥 𫚒 鱾 鳚 鲃 鳛 鱽 鲏 鲬 鳋 鲺 鲱 鲈 鲇 鳀 鲲 鲥 鳎 鲤 鲳 鳁 鳗 鲉 鳂 鳃 鳄 鳢 鲴 鳏 鲗 鲖 鲣 鲿 鲊 鳆 鳅 稣 鳤 鲷 鲍 鿕 𩾃 鲦 鿴 鲵 鲋 鲌 鳇 鳈  鲘 鿸 鲧 鳐 鲙 鲶 鲹 鲐 鲻 鲂 鲸 鳣 鳙 𩾌 鲛 鲚 鿷 鳑 鿶 鳊 鳉 鲜 鳝 鳒  鳟 鳞 鲩 𩽾 鿹 魚 鰆 鰿 鯖 鮇 魭 鮔 鮧 魟 鮭 鰢 鱙 鯐 鮚 鱚 鱝 鮳 鯺 鮱 鰭 鯥 鯪 魼 鰪 鰱 鱄 鯟 鯁 鰋 䲔 鯃 鰏 鰸 鰽 鰹 鯻 魺 鰾 鱏 鯂 鱺 鰊 鯆 魳 魽 鯕 鯫 鮿 鰳 鱑 鰈 鰙 鮕 鱷 鰗 鱹 鱴 鱯 鯠 魱 魨 魮 鯄 鰖 鰔 鱤 鱱 鰄 鯎 鮁 鮖 鮪 鮞 魾 魷 鱁 鱖 鮬 鱬 鱈 鱩 鮃 鰎 鱘 鱐 鯽 䱚 鮶 鮼 鯞 鰕 鮄 鰯 魢 䲁 䰾 鰼 魛 鮉 鮙 鯭 鮍 魣 鰇 鱊 鯒 鱍 鰠 鯴 鯡 鮛 鱸 鱋 鯱 鰬 鱥 鮎 魯 鰣 鱪 鯷 鯤 鰑 鱡 鿩 鰂 鰨 魻 鯉 鯧 鰛 鰻 鰅 鱦 鯹 鯣 鮋 鰃 鰓 鰐 鱓 鱢 鱧 鯝 䱻 鮰 鱰 鱞 鰥 鮂 鰮 鮦 魶 魝 魦 鮹 鱨 鱂 鮏 鯯 鮢 魹 鮓 鯌 鰒 鯏 鰍 穌 鯚 鯘 魠 鱎 鱵 䲘 魥 鯛 鮑 鮈 魩 魡 鮠 鱻 鮸 鱌 鰶 鮥 鯦 鮗 鱮 魸 鯢 鯾 鮴 鯅 鮒 鮲 鮘 鮊 鰉 鷠 鰞 鰁 鱳 鰤 鯸 鯓 鰷 魤 鮣 鰡 鮨 鮜 鿳 魬 䲗 鯀 鯑 鮡 鯼 鱕 鰀 鰩 鮾 鱫 魜 魞 鮽 鮯 鱠 鯩 魵 魪 䱵 魿 鯰 鱜 鯵 鮐 鮻 鰺 鯔 鱲 魴 鯲 鯙 鰝 鯨 鱣 鱅 鱇 魧 鯳 鮫 魰 鮌 鯍 鱆 鯜 鱭 鰟 魲 鯿 鯶 鰰 魫 鮅 鮮 鱔 鱃 鱶 鮩 鰜 鰌 鱒 鱗 鰦 鮷 鮵 鱛 鯮 鯇 鰚 鰘 鮀 鰫 鮟 鿐 鯋 鵵 免 勉 兔 逸 勨 象 奂 负 奐 敻 夐 烉 饣 饯 馌 馎 馕 饾 饵 馑 馓 馍 馇 饽 饨 饤 饶 馔 饧 饲 馃 馄 馒 馈 蚀 馉 饳 饩 饬 饪 饰 𫗠 饦 饿 饫 饥 饱 馋 馅 饮 饹 馊 𫗰 饷 馏 饭 馁 馀 饸 饴 馂 饻 饺 馐 饼 馆 亇 尔 玺 覙 迩 角 觟 觨 觰 觫 觾 觵 觩 觭 觮 觖 觔 解 蟹 邂 觛 觶 触 觸 觽 觿 觘 觥 觓 觞 觴 觙 觤 觼 觡 觬 鵤 觻 觹 觗 觝 觚 觪 觧 觲 觯 斛 臽 鹐 欿 鵮 燄 欠 夕 舛 桀 麁 夘 夗 駌 眢 盌 㠾 鸳 鴛 妴 怨 邜 名 頟 敋 鵅 雒 外 夞 迯 夝 多 夡 卶 翗 夠 郺 迻 飧 頯 然 祭 豋 詧 遙 粂 灸 邎 斘 夤 爒 炙 夊 夂 久 夆 逢 蠭 㷭 夅 逄 条 务 各 备 邍 惫 洜 处 咎 昝 処 夈 冬 螽 㼝 䗬 凨 凬 凩 夙 凮 鳳 凤 凪 凧 凰 鳯 風 飋 颫 飃 飅 颬 颲 颰 飇 飉 颹 飂 颾 颭 颶 颺 颸 颵 颴 颳 颮 飍 颼 飀 颩 颱 䬃 颷 飈 风 飏 飐 飓 飔 飑 飕 飗 飚 凲 亻 仁 仨 仹 輿 偰 舆 與 歟 舉 轝 礜 擧 鸒 譽 俦 夓 俸 偆 傣 伟 段 仠 仼 傲 債 债 倩 儬 倵 俵 傃 興 臖 璺 釁 爨 舋 爂 侙 傋 佅 传 盥 侀 僣 儧 壆 黌 礐 學 斅 斆 覺 嶨 澩 嚳 鱟 觷 鷽 雤 燢 伕 伝 佞 片 臼 毁 毀 舃 舁 倢 舅 帠 鄋 遚 叟 鼠 鼱 鼭 鼴 鼯 鼥 鼫 鿻 鼣 鼦 鿼 鼳 鼰 鼹 鼬 鼺 鼪 鼮 鼩 鼨 鼶 鼷 鼢 鼤 鼲 鼸 鼧 鼵 舄 郳 鶂 兒 斞 臾 惥 毇 牘 牔 牍 牒 佢 侇 牋 牊 覑 牐 牎 牌 牕 版 牏 牗 牓 牖 牑 牉 什 仜 仕 丘 倀 佳 儎 傌 僥 傤 侍 儔 佂 傿 佶 儓 僖 儥 僨 偾 岳 俹 僫 乒 侤 侾 偖 佬 兵 倰 佉 乓 俧 倖 伍 俥 僌 僆 傳 僡 倲 傅 便 偃 倳 僵 俉 偪 傴 傮 儖 儾 何 使 侸 価 僄 傈 僊 價 僲 偠 僳 儷 俌 伂 侢 倆 俩 俪 伎 屔 邱 佄 佴 倛 偡 僛 倻 借 僅 儺 傼 僙 傇 僷 伳 偞 偌 備 憊 供 估 值 傎 値 做 偀 儚 儆 僃 儰 俨 儊 僸 鸺 鵂 倈 倯 休 体 恷 烋 侼 伡 仾 延 郔 蜑 伅 伢 僭 傾 倾 佤 仳 偕 仃 付 俅 姇 怤 侲 傉 佐 伌 例 伖 傶 佦 佑 佰 優 偭 侑 佈 侕 偄 侟 僀 伓 伾 俖 优 儮 傆 倚 儞 伛 傸 俠 仗 侉 倷 倴 俺 偧 伏 傄 僚 侄 倒 俓 儒 伻 俫 侠 侥 伐 垡 俴 代 垈 柋 貸 贷 黛 帒 岱 牮 𥿝 袋 白 自 侓 皇 皟 皘 遑 健 皩 皝 甈 臲 鷍 臬 皌 臰 鄓 臭 鄡 梟 島 鳬 裊 鳥 鷌 鴚 鶀 鸌 鵦 鴃 鳦 鳨 鄥 鸔 鵿 㠀 䳗 䳘 鳧 鴼 鴤 鶃 鴏 鶳 鵻 鷈 鵌 鵔 鷻 鸃 鴕 鴥 郋 皁 皢 鼻 鼾 齉 齄 䶑 齀 鼿 齂 䶊 齇 齃 齈 劓 鼼 鼽 齁 齅 齆 皣 旣 墍 曁 卽 皍 臫 皂 臮 翱 鷎 皋 辠 皬 臯 翺 鷱 息 鄎 邉 臱 邊 皅 廹 劰 鄔 歍 兠 皉 儘 皔 畠 帛 緜 皚 皑 皠 龜 㿠 烏 佷 癿 泉 灥 伊 卑 皓 郫 鿙 鹎 鵯 鿚 皒 敀 皗 的 侰 皞 皥 皛 皨 魄 皪 皦 皡 兜 皃 皀 鬼 魅 魊 魒 魎 魉 鬾 魌 魆 魃 魖 魓 魍 魈 魋 鬿 鬽 魀 魕 魑 魐 魁 皈 鿘 皤 皭 皧 皊 樂 㿝 𣪕 邀 敫 鸄 譥 皜 皫 皎 迫 侵 皐 翶 楽 皏 皖 阜 顊 師 頧 歸 蛗 帥 峊 鴭 追 甶 假 禹 鄅 伄 佛 僎 鄇 侯 倨 偓 侷 僝 僻 倔 兎 伲 偋 伬 侭 偉 血 睾 䘏 衆 衈 衊 衃 衄 卹 衂 欰 衉 衇 䘑 衅 㐷 囱 悤 囪 囟 恖 顖 粵 奧 僇 粤 奥 嶴 仍 亿 身 躼 軇 躽 軀 躰 射 軅 躸 躯 躬 躱 躵 𨉣 躶 軁 躳 軃 軆 躺 䠶 躷 躲 躹 鵢 躮 躿 軈 軄 躴 躭 躾 軂 軉 躻 伺 币 向 逈 他 怹 仂 伽 佋 仞 仭 偦 仔 佊 伃 僪 俑 傩 僜 仅 川 仩 俳 佧 俶 偼 儢 俿 偝 佔 倬 偵 侦 佌 偨 儏 順 顺 㐰 但 伹 倶 俱 侱 偍 儤 倮 倱 偒 俔 儩 側 俣 傝 伸 俚 倡 僂 僈 們 僴 僩 偶 偮 僶 敒 煲 保 堡 賲 偈 儑 佀 俋 仲 佃 伷 俜 偎 侽 僓 儙 儡 儽 促 傫 偲 侣 偔 傊 儼 偘 僤 僺 僼 儂 倎 個 俁 候 侶 侃 諐 伿 佒 傦 佪 儇 㑩 儸 伵 伣 侧 侗 僕 仙 偳 傰 催 儶 侺 跾 鋚 焂 攸 䩦 悠 鞗 條 鎥 倏 翛 偹 儵 脩 鯈 修 絛 倐 仯 偗 仆 侊 俏 倘 僘 偿 償 儅 儻 傥 屲 似 仦 仵 件 儛 侏 倂 倁 佚 仡 伤 仟 任 作 栠 侹 俈 賃 赁 倕 凭 鵀 儹 侁 恁 傷 偅 働 佸 偛 俰 俐 俬 偢 僽 倭 侮 伥 仛 俄 仸 僑 侨 伋 伇 仉 仇 伜 仴 俷 佣 倗 倜 佨 佝 侚 㑳  伆 偬 仢 伨 佹 儋 㑇  鿇 偩 儳 俛 像 你 您 傑 佲 侈 傺 佭 佫 俻 倃 偺 俢 佟 佩 偑 傁 倪 伯 偟 俾 傀 儌 偊 侐 傯 傻 㐺 倠 㑺 儁 僬 低 仰 化 华 貨 货 儗 伒 偱 俽 儨 𠈁 侜 仮 傂 偫 傱 乑 係 仫 俇 倄 俙 佻 僠 僁 侳 俗 倸 俘 偁 傜 僞 傒 俀 僢 僾 儍 仈 佺 倽 俆 侩 佮 儉 倹 儈 偷 偸 倫 俭 伧 份 佾 佡 伱 价 伦 伀 傟 倊 傖 仱 僋 伶 僟 仏 佁 侔 俟 俊 傪 伮 侞 儠 隹 隼 鶽 集 顀 隽 隻 售 雋 燞 雔 雙 犨 雥 雦 雧 讐 讎 犫 進 雠 焦 顦 劁 鹪 鷦 信 儲 傠 住 仿 倣 儴 傐 倞 僦 偯 停 儫 儃 侫 儣 傭 傏 儦 伉 依 㑊 侂 俯 倅 俲 傚 佼 伩 侪 侅 伭 傗 俼 位 儭 倍 偣 傽 僮 傹 億 儱 偐 倿 傡 儕 偙 傍 俍 傓 偏 僱 储 伔 傕 侬 佽 们 佖 伈 佯 僐 傞 伴 儀 併 儯 倦 傔 偤 僔 偂 侎 僯 偻 俤 偽 伪 侻 僧 儝 僗 倓 伙 仪 伫 僿 倧 俒 儐 俕 佇 傢 倌 侘 倇 傧 佗 倥 僒 傛 侒 儜 乐 印 氏 氒 昏 𨓈 帋 氐 邸 鸱 鴟 卬 迎 卿 卯 乮 斵 貿 鄮 留 鹠 鶹 遛 贸 劉 卵 贕 毈 孵 儿 匕 頴 颕 駂 鸨 鴇 旨 眞 顚 鷆 鴲 潁 颍 肄 疑 觺 欵 穎 颖 顈 匘 熲 颎 乕 逓 巵 卮 斤 頎 颀 后 垕 劶 郈 逅 劤 邤 盾 瞂 鶞 貭 遁 斶 质 欣 斦 啠 質 劕 斥 近 戶 㐆 殷 慇 所 乺 凢 甪 舟 舡 艚 艦 舸 舾 艓 舼 艧 艨 艢 舭 艜 𦨩 舿 舦 艝 艍 艉 舥 舠 艋 𦨭 艠 郍 舻 艣 艫 䑲 䑽 舺 艃 艒 艛 艥 舯 舳 盘 舰 舢 艄 艡 舴 艇 艁 艞 般 槃 鎜 褩 鞶 磐 螌 盤 幋 搫 縏 媻 船 舤 鸼 艬 艪 艂 舽 艘 舶 艎 鵃 艊 艭 舧 舨 艐 艀 艅 𦪙 舱 舩 艙 舲 艌 舫 艔 航 舷 艈 艟 𦪽 艩 艕 艆 舮 艑 艖 艤 艏 艗 舣 舵 返 反 彳 彺 衎 行 鸻 鴴 衏 徢 衐 䴘 歋 鷉 虒 遞 徍 街 徺 待 征 徰 徒 惩 鿉 衙 徱 徆 徚 徣 衖 徝 衠 憄 衚 德 徳 徔 徠 術 彻 徛 徑 徕 律 徤 很 徦 彿 徲 鿈 衞 躛 讏 徫 衛 躗 讆 彵 彼 径 徘 徙 徏 徂 得 徎 徥 忂 衢 忁 徊 衕 徵 懲 徴 黴 幑 微 鰴 徽 徾 徜 衔 徃 衘 御 禦 衝 復 彶 役 垼 徟 徇 彴 衡 徨 鵆 徼 彽 循 銜 從 聳 慫 熧 衑 徭 徯 徐 徻 彸 彾 後 衟 往 彷 忀 衒 徹 勶 徸 徿 徬 徧 徉 従 衜 徶 徖 衍 愆 爪 坕 爬 爮 瓥 瓜 瓞 瓟 瓝 㼎 彡 須 頾 盨 澃 嬃 须 媭 丯 頿 辵 覛 胤 系 么 犭 猰 獉 犴 狂 獓 猜 鵟 逛 狋 狨 獁 獟 狤 猿 獖 猪 橥 狫 狟 獑 猼 㹴 獺 獭 犻 猉 猎 獚 狜 猢 獏 獦 猫 玂 獾 獲 獴 𤞤 猍 狇 猹 㹠 犽 狴 狘 狾 犲 獿 獶 狉 狵 犹 獂 猗 獮 獗 狹 犾 獠 獳 㺢 狭 狠 猳 獼 猕 狒 狔 狃 峱 猸 犸 犯 㹢 猛 犼 狲 猻 狓 猱 獝 猤 猅 獹 猇 獩 狚 狙 猂 玃 猓 猑 狽 狎 狸 猖 獌 猩 猲 㹭 狆 猥 猬 玁 狷 独 猠 猧 猾 獧 獨 猡 玀 狈 狪 狦 獛 猯 獕 狮 猭 狌 猘 犵 狏 狅 獯 狧 猁 獢 犰 狍 狗 狥 㺀 犳 狰 狝 獬 狢 猦 犱 獀 獡 猊 狿 狛 獆 獋 猈 獥 獔 獅 猴 猚 狐 狶 狣 猣 猨 猙 猺 猞 狳 狯 獫 獪 㺄 猃 獊 狑 狕 狁 狻 獵 狺 獄 鸑 獤 獽 猄 犿 犷 獷 犺 猝 狡 獐 獞 獍 狼 猏 猵 狱 猽 𤞶 猐 獇 猶 獜 獈 獙 逖 狄 悐 猔 獱 狞 狩 㺍 狖 獰 猀 猟 〤 㐅 舖 舒 鵨 舘 釒 鏏 鍥 䥛 銇 鋳 銭 釬 錆 錻 錶 鈺 鉽 釫 釪 銢 銒 鈃 鉶 鈨 鐟 鑚 鈇 鉅 銕 針 釭 釷 鋹 銈 鎷 鐃 鑄 鉦 銡 鐵 鎱 鐡 鑟 鐼 錏 鐚 鈣 銾 銬 鍺 銠 錴 錂 鉣 鎑 鋕 鐽 錷 鏩 鏈 鏄 鏸 錬 鎛 鑎 鎶 鋙 鑩 鍢 鏂 鎘 鏪 鏗 鑦 鑬 鑑 鏉 鋉 鉕 鈳 鋀 鏢 鐔 鍊 鋪 鉔 鈵 鈘 鉗 鉺 鑷 錤 鍖 鐁 鋷 鎁 銸 鏵 鐯 鑉 錯 鐄 鏾 鏋 鐷 鉪 鍱 鐂 鍩 鑶 鉷 鈷 鎮 鍸 鋴 鍣 鏌 钄 錨 鑵 鍈 鑖 鑝 錵 鑊 銰 鎝 錺 鋩 鑮 𨧀 鑻 錸 䥑 鈢 鉢 鉥 錰 鋍 鎍 鈍 釾 鋣 鐕 鈚 鍇 鉞 釘 釮 銶 鋠 鎒 鍼 銊 鈪 鋮 鈸 鏚 鉐 銆 顉 銪 鈽 銌 鈈 鉟 銔 鈜 錡 鑈 鐝 鏯 鋏 釱 銙 錼 鍷 錛 鈦 鐐 龯 銍 鋞 鍿 鑐 鐳 鋱 鋄 錽 鈛 錢 釴 銉 鍵 鐞 鏽 銀 録 鋟 鍜 鈏 鈟 鏹 鉘 鐨 鈱 鍲 釲 鐉 鋸 鋦 鐴 钃 鈮 鈬 鈌 鈕 鍏 鈀 鎇 鑃 鏐 釢 釔 鉰 釶 釖 釛 鉫 鉊 釰 釼 釕 釨 錳 鈹 鍒 鐍 鎟 錣 銿 鍨 鐙 鏺 釵 錒 鐊 鉲 钀 鐻 鐪 鑪 鑢 鎼 錿 鏬 鈙 鉳 鐬 錹 鑡 鉆 鋽 鍞 鏀 釦 鈤 鉭 鉏 鉬 銲 鍀 鋥 鍉 鑺 钁 鏎 鑤 錁 鐤 錕 鍚 鋧 鋇 鍘 鋘 鎉 鋤 鉀 鉮 鋰 錩 鏤 鎾 鏝 鍆 鐦 鑭 鐧 鐗 鍝 鍓 鎤 鍟 錫 鍻 鐛 鈻 鈡 鈿 鈾 鍡 鐀 鑓 鑘 鑸 鏴 鋜 鎅 鏍 鍶 鋁 鍔 鋛 鐰 鋗 銱 鉵 錪 錮 鉙 銦 鉠 鉂 鍋 鐹 鎠 鐸 鐶 鐲 鑼 䥯 𨭆 銅 鈉 鋼 龬 鏷 鑆 鎧 錌 鍴 銟 鏰 鎽 鏙 鑴 釗 鈔 釙 銧 鎖 銷 鋿 鏜 鏿 鑜 鐺 钂 鏛 鐣 鎲 錄 鏆 鉧 鏘 鈯 鉯 釓 錔 釥 鎎 鈝 鉎 銖 鉃 鉄 釳 鉇 釺 鈓 鈼 鋌 鋯 錘 鑽 銑 銩 鍾 鍑 鑂 鉓 銛 懖 鍤 鑙 鋓 鏫 鑗 鍬 鉌 銹 鋵 錗 鋂 鋨 鐈 鏼 鈒 鈠 鉛 釠 釚 釩 鈅 錋 錭 鉋 鉤 銁 鋾 銏 鍃 鍯 鈎 釣 鍧 鈞 憌 錚 銫 鑱 鑥 鋔 鐌 鉨 錎 欽 釸 銘 鉹 鋒 鏠 鉻 鉖 釻 鍛 鎪 鋲 銝 鋋 鉜 鉑 鍠 鎳 鵭 鎴 鎢 錦 錍 鑠 鎚 鍭 鏓 鎞 鎫 鐭 銵 銄 釧 鏅 鎀 銋 鈋 錐 鎨 鏶 鎸 鐫 鐎 銽 錉 鉚 鎦 鎭 釿 銗 鍎 鍁 鑕 鈑 鏦 釽 鈲 釤 䤨 鎩 銚 鍐 鐇 鏭 銼 鑯 鋊 鍰 鋝 鋢 鎐 鋖 鑀 鑁 釟 釞 銓 鍂 鉿 鑰 鐱 鎿 鍮 錀 鈖 銳 鉩 鉁 鈆 鎓 鎗 鈐 鋡 鈴 錜 銯 鐖 鐑 鈶 鉾 鈗 鋑 鏒 釹 銣 鏁 鎻 錙 鑞 鉒 鈁 鍦 鏇 鏃 錞 鐓 鑲 鎬 鍄 鈰 釯 龲 鍍 鑛 鏣 鏞 鎕 鏮 鏕 鑣 鈧 銥 鉱 鐮 錊 鉸 鈫 鉉 鏲 錥 鋶 銃 鉝 鋅 錇 鏱 鐘 鏡 鐿 鑨 䥥 鏟 鏑 鑇 鍗 鎊 鋃 鎯 鈩 錑 䥇 鍽 鍕 鎺 鈂 鉍 鈊 鐥 鎈 錓 鉡 鎂 鉼 鎹 錈 鎌 鐏 鎆 鐠 銤 鏻 鎙 鐩 鎰 鎡 銻 鋭 鏳 鑅 鐒 錟 鈥 銂 鈄 鎋 鑳 錝 鋎 錠 鍹 鏔 鑧 鑌 鋐 鎵 錧 鋺 鑔 鏥 鉈 鑹 鎔 銨 鑏 鍅 𨨏 鐋 鎃 鎄 叙 敍 敘 雓 斜 厁 郐 刽 舗 頜 颌 翖 歙 郃 敆 龤 龥 龣 龢 龡 鸙 顩 劎 劒 劔 劍 斂 歛 㧱 鸽 欱 鴿 剱 剣 鄶 劊 朇 鄃 覦 觎 毹 歈 弒 剎 杀 弑 閷 刹 殺 敎 肴 郩 殽 希 瓻 郗 欷 鵗 㕁 郄 剑 敛 戗 创 鸧 頒 颁 邠 攽 鳻 乏 鴔 頫 覜 鴵 兆 鼗 逃 敓 刈 凶 兇 乊 釈 释 釉 勫 翻 鄱 飜 鷭 釋 釆 番 悉 乎 乯 乥 鳰 尣 尩 尦 坐 韱 夎 剉 睂 俎 爼 豄 谼 谺 谹 豃 豂 谻 卻 郤 鹆 欲 螸 慾 鵒 豀 谽 豅 谾 㫺 父 仌 爻 从 丛 釡 釜 耸 爺 爸 爷 谷 逧 爹 斧 怂 頌 颂 勜 鹟 鶲 毤 飮 飠 飦 餦 饒 饎 饙 饁 饐 餺 饇 餗 饢 餖 餔 餌 饚 饉 饊 餬 饃 餀 餝 饛 餷 餑 飩 飣 餪 餴 餣 餞 饌 飼 餟 饖 飷 饆 餜 餛 餳 饂 饅 餲 餵 饋 蝕 餶 饠 餇 饄 饓 餯 飿 餼 餠 飭 飪 飵 饡 飾 餂 餧 飥 餓 飫 飢 飽 饞 餡 飲 餎 餿 餭 餽 䭔 餱 餉 餁 飹 餾 飯 餰 餚 餙 餆 饀 餒 飤 餘 餄 飻 餩 饑 飴 餕 飳 饟 饘 飰 饝 餹 餏 餃 餢 餫 飶 饍 饈 餻 餅 餸 𩜇 餤 館 戧 創 鶬 㱃 韽 頷 颔 欦 鳹 雂 瓴 領 领 翎 邻 刢 敜 鸰 鴒 爫 鶢 爰 鶏 㥯 糴 彩 采 寽 頱 虢 爭 孚 郛 乳 嗠 覶 亂 辭 覓 爵 觅 爯 䍃 遥 鹞 颻 飖 鷂 繇 爲 爳 鄬 噕 舀 鷄 雞 谿 奚 乿 妥 鵎 豸 䝟 豻 貆 貙 貘 貓 貛 豼 豺 貊 豾 䝙 貄 貇 墾 懇 貑 貂 貋 貜 貍 貗 貚 豽 貒 蠫 貀 豿 豹 貉 貎 貅 貃 貏 貌 邈 貔 貈 貕 貐 貖 貁 爱 辤 受 舜 愛 鬯 八 人 乂 入 亼 全 佱 舍 金 錱 淾 鑫 余 佘 畬 畲 峹 嵞 途 悆 会 侴 仐 仝 舎 合 鿖 盫 樖 弇 龛 命 翕 畣 龠 僉 盒 拿 搻 龕 會 俞 逾 愈 兪 侖 仺 兮 鿪 佥 仓 分 坌 瓫 弅 貧 蚠 兺 盆 贫 岔 麄 忿 炃 个 企 兌 肏 仚 屳 亾 兦 氽 汆 尒 介 鿗 仑 傘 𠌂 众 公 枀 瓮 翁 兊 忩 亽 禽 食 倉 込 今 侌 酓 盦 含 貪 贪 令 衾 念 伞 籴 仒 纟 绑 纬 绩 䌸 纡 绒 纭 线 红 结 缬 绪 绫 缚 绠 缰 缥 续 绀 缂 绁 缜 绬 缙 缃 辔 练 纯 纰 纣 缛 缄 绂 缅 纮 绮 绔 缭 绖 𦈡 绕 绿 纼 绋 缗 纪 纽 缪 绍 纫 经 纾 缀 绎 绯 绰 组 缇 缈 绲 绅 缊 缦 缉 细 䌷  缱 缋 缧 缌 绳 缲 绢 织 缳 缨 䌹 纲 纳 缆 纱 绡 绱 缘 绌 纠 纥 𫄟 纤 纴 缍 缵 绣 级 绷 绸 绚 绹 约 绉 绝 缝 绛 绦 络 绺 终 纨 缎 缏 绵 缐 缴 缒 缑 维 纸 绗 纵 绤 缓 𦈠 䌽 绥 绶 绘 给 纷 纶 绐 缫 缁 纺 缞 缟 纩 缠 缡 绞 纹 统 缔 编 缮 绊 绻 缣 继 缕 䍁 缢 绨 缯 纻 综 绽 绾 缤 缩 乡 鄊 郷 蚃 鄕 飨 鄉 蠁 嚮 饗 響 丝 鸶 幺 盭 幻 幼 孧 鴢 乣 糸 畿 幾 蠿 斷 糹 綁 縥 績 綪 縤 紆 纉 絨 紜 緁 緀 紅 絓 繞 纎 結 纈 繥 續 繊 緒 緖 綾 紶 続 綕 繨 緈 絙 轡 縺 縳 繐 縛 綆 緎 繮 繿 纜 綀 縹 緸 絤 綇 纚 練 絚 緉 紺 綨 緅 緙 繖 縙 紲 緤 縝 縸 緢 緓 繱 纄 縉 綝 緗 繬 絊 絉 綍 純 紕 糽 紂 絿 縟 緘 縅 絾 紱 縬 絔 緾 纒 纋 緬 絠 緛 紑 紌 縓 紘 綺 綊 絝 紎 繚 絰 緻 經 繧 繻 綫 繣 繡 繍 緑 縁 綅 縀 紖 繦 紼 紭 繈 緡 紀 繏 紐 緯 紦 繆 糿 糼 絕 紹 紉 綛 縃 紴 紓 繘 縔 綴 経 紁 緋 纑 綽 緽 紪 䋎 組 緹 繓 縪 緲 綶 緄 絸 繉 纓 䌈 紳 縄 縷 緼 縵 繝 緝 繩 縨 緆 絏 細 紬 綥 繢 繾 纝 緭 縲 緦 絽 縜 繟 繰 絹 繷 綑 絪 紻 緺 縎 絗 繹 繯 纙 縕 纆 絧 絅 納 綗 綱 網 繃 繀 纗 紗 絖 綃 緔 綠 緣 絀 糾 糺 絑 紩 紇 絁 紝 綎 綞 纘 緟 緮 纁 絬 綉 緌 繑 級 紣 綳 綢 絇 絢 縐 綯 緫 約 繺 絶 纔 絻 繲 繎 縩 綘 縫 絳 絡 綹 終 紈 緞 緶 綖 紨 絥 絈 綿 線 綼 纅 繳 縋 緱 總 繌 紃 緥 纀 縧 絍 維 紙 緍 紤 絎 縰 縱 縦 絺 絩 緵 繙 纖 緃 綌 緩 䌥 綵 綒 縚 縘 綏 絼 綬 絟 絵 給 繪 緰 綸 紛 紒 紾 総 紟 紷 絲 鷥 繼 紿 緿 縿 繅 緇 纞 紸 紡 縼 鶭 縗 綧 纕 縞 綡 綂 繵 纊 纏 絋 縭 綷 纐 絞 紋 緕 絯 絃 縴 繂 統 繶 織 纃 締 縍 綟 編 緷 紞 絘 絴 繕 縒 絆 絣 綣 縑 緧 繜 継 繗 縌 繸 縊 綈 綐 縂 繒 緂 絒 紏 縖 綜 綄 綻 縇 縯 繽 紵 綋 綰 綩 縮 紽 縡 縆 緪 厶 弁 𨚕 鴘 毵 叁 軬 貵 奙 畚 参 台 貟 枲 瓵 邰 𥁐 刣 乨 辝 迨 怠 炱 贠 能 螚 態 熋 熊 厼 牟 劺 鴾 欸 逘 矣 允 皴 鵕 逡 夋 厸 厽 亝 垒 剼 毿 叄 㕘 叅 參 遪 絫 斚 女 妦 媋 嫀 奸 嫧 婧 娬 婊 嫊 媾 嫟 嬺 妺 妹 姸 妍 妌 妩 妧 妋 婖 娀 妘 婕 姖 姨 妅 娃 媽 嬈 嬦 姃 嫣 姞 媴 嬯 嬉 嬻 婭 媎 姥 婈 嬄 娡 婞 姮 嫥 娻 婳 娪 嫗 姫 嫩 嬾 嫰 娕 妸 嫖 婹 孋 媡 姉 妓 姏 媒 娸 媅 娵 嬅 嫤 嫨 嬿 嫹 媶 媟 婼 娂 姑 嫃 姬 媩 娔 嫴 婻 嫫 孏 媌 孉 媖 嬞 婲 嬳 娅 嬙 婡 嫱 妣 媘 𡛟 奵 娠 媷 嫕 娾 媠 媙 娍 妭 妬 媔 姷 媆 妚 娝 娏 嫄 婍 嬭 妪 姱 嫽 姪 娙 嫮 孀 嬬 娆 妇 嫿 嬧 娽 婦 婽 娹 嫋 姄 妃 婮 媉 孎 娓 妮 妜 妞 媁 妑 媚 妈 嬥 嫪 奶 娜 她 妱 婿 好 恏 妤 媃 娺 嬁 奴 駑 砮 弩 驽 努 孥 帑 胬 拏 鴑 怒 邚 婀 嫷 婔 婌 媫 婋 嫭 婥 媜 如 妲 姐 娨 媞 婐 婫 婸 娊 孆 娱 妽 娌 娼 媢 媪 嫚 孄 嫻 嫺 媀 桇 妕 妯 娉 娚 嫐 嬇 媦 娖 嫘 媤 孍 嬋 嬠 娟 帤 娲 婰 婟 娯 娛 挐 鴽 姻 姎 絮 恕 媧 嬕 嬛 嬽 媼 嫼 姛 姌 姍 妠 奾 嬍 婩 媺 媏 孈 妙 姯 娋 嫦 姆 媸 姒 姓 姩 嫵 姝 妷 奷 妊 妰 娗 娷 姺 媑 姡 娳 姀 婑 娒 奼 娥 妖 嬌 娇 孂 婤 姁 姰 媰 姗 妁 婅 姽 婙 媍 娩 嬎 婏 嬔 嫓 妳 姳 姼 奺 姵 嬩 嬹 嫂 婗 娦 娫 媓 嬝 嬶 媳 婂 婢 媿 嬓 媲 姠 婣 媬 娰 姙 婎 孇 嫶 姊 婚 媹 嬼 妡 姤 㛂 姂 姚 嬏 孅 媛 婇 娐 媱 婬 嬀 嫍 娞 嫒 嬡 姾 姶 媕 嬆 嬐 嬒 媮 婾 婨 妢 妎 妐 妗 娢 姈 嬵 始 姢 娭 奻 姧 姦 娮 妵 妨 嫙 孃 婛 婷 嬗 嫬 嫲 孊 嬷 嬤 嫞 嫝 妔 嬢 嫉 嬚 姣 妏 姟 妶 媇 婄 嫜 嬑 嬂 嫡 媂 嫎 娘 嫏 妒 媥 媈 嫇 妉 娴 妼 嫸 嫅 姅 媄 嬟 姘 婘 嫌 媨 媊 嫾 嬘 嬨 娣 媯 妫 婵 娧 嬫 婒 婃 婝 媗 嬪 嫁 婶 婠 姹 婉 嫔 嬸 嫆 姲 嬣 媣 巜 巛 煭 廵 𠞰 勦 鄛 剿 巢 邕 雝 甾 疀 鶅 巤 邋 巡 災 乄 丶 亠 訁 言 譿 誆 誄 訐 謸 謮 請 諘 試 講 訏 詽 訮 誡 譛 讃 誱 詎 計 訌 詿 譊 詩 譸 証 詰 譆 讀 讟 誟 諸 詓 読 誌 謰 譓 諌 謌 語 諨 謳 誎 訶 謤 諲 譚 諫 誧 詌 誀 讘 謀 諆 諶 諏 譁 讛 諎 謹 諽 讌 詍 諜 諾 鿁 詁 謓 謿 讍 諵 謨 譪 讙 誮 護 謊 諃 誣 誺 訹 誖 訰 訝 譖 諧 訂 討 誫 諴 誠 詙 詴 訧 讈 謜 諑 詼 䛟 誇 譇 誈 誙 謣 譳 評 諓 詪 誛 譀 訠 誸 記 譔 誋 誳 謘 訳 訣 諱 謵 謬 詞 訑 詔 訒 譅 認 詡 諝 詖 譎 諁 誦 證 訍 讔 訊 誹 諔 讞 謔 謯 譃 諕 謼 訨 詀 訿 詚 詛 諟 課 諹 誢 誤 訷 誯 謱 謾 讕 譋 讇 諿 譝 謃 謁 訲 讉 譴 讄 謂 謖 諰 諤 讝 譂 譟 譨 詋 詇 諣 譯 譞 訵 詷 詗 訥 誷 譵 訕 諯 讗 訬 訃 誚 譡 讜 謴 詜 詘 訆 誻 許 譕 誅 詄 訖 𧦧 詐 誔 誥 諈 讚 詵 諥 話 誗 謻 訸 誘 諉 誨 託 誐 訞 譑 譗 訯 設 訅 訉 調 訽 詢 謅 詾 訋 諊 詭 譫 諍 讒 讂 諂 謋 詺 誃 謠 詻 諷 訙 譭 謏 誽 諛 誕 詂 詯 諻 諀 謉 譤 謥 謝 訓 訛 誰 謢 譙 䛡 諙 詆 詣 譺 訢 詬 訴 謕 誑 誵 誂 訩 詤 譒 讖 訤 諼 謡 譌 謟 謑 詮 詥 讑 譣 譮 諭 論 諡 訜 說 診 訟 謒 訡 誝 詅 諗 詏 譏 龻 卛 欒 奱 彎 孿 曫 矕 蠻 臠 巒 灓 攣 變 鸞 鑾 孌 戀 詒 誒 誜 謲 詉 誩 譶 註 訪 諄 譈 讓 謞 諒 諪 譹 譠 謶 譲 謧 譧 誶 詨 該 詃 諳 譩 識 諺 謫 讁 謪 諦 謗 誏 謆 諞 這 詠 諢 訦 諮 謐 悥 訫 詳 詊 議 誁 謙 譐 謭 譾 諩 譜 謎 詸 譢 謚 説 譄 燮 夑 爕 談 詶 誴 諚 諠 詝 誼 詫 詑 讅 主 褭 褻 迬 殶 衺 亵 方 瓬 旑 旔 邡 旚 旆 旗 旊 旖 旎 施 旋 斿 遊 旇 斾 旓 旌 旄 族 鷟 斻 旃 旟 旅 膂 膐 旂 旐 旛 放 旝 旍 旜 旒 旞 鴋 旙 斺 於 乻 旕 旀 堃 旈 旘 袤 裵 裹 裏 亰 衰 恴 裛 亨 享 㝄 郭 嚲 鐜 敦 墪 撉 憝 鹑 孰 塾 熟 鶉 㝇 亸 烹 亩 畝 畒 畆 亯 勷 瓤 襄 㪟 畗 高 槀 髛 鄗 敲 髜 髞 稾 毃 歊 鶮 髚 髝 衷 京 就 蹵 鹫 鷲 勍 剠 鶁 哀 亴 亭 豪 膏 毫 稁 亳 亮 禀 亶 邅 顫 颤 勯 皽 氈 鹯 鸇 稟 褱 市 髙 栾 弯 孪 变 蛮 脔 峦 挛 鸾 変 鵉 銮 娈 恋 卞 亡 杗 氓 邙 吂 盲 朚 䖟 蝱 驘 臝 贏 蠃 赢 鸁 嬴 羸 肓 衁 巟 妄 忘 望 广 緳 廒 庑 袠 庄 庤 廚 庨 庱 廅 庒 庫 廤 庮 廲 庯 庋 廳 廝 廰 庹 𢾖 剫 度 庴 廑 廣 鄺 懬 席 庻 庶 䗪 鹧 鷓 遮 廟 鿮 庿 黀 劘 穈 黁 糜 麻 塺 黂 磨 靡 爢 麿 犘 麾 摩 魔 麽 麼 縻 廂 廧 庲 床 库 庉 庌 廎 庼 庇 庁 庪 廈 廗 庬 庞 庆 庵 庢 庸 鄘 鷛 唐 鄌 鶶 廐 廄 康 鹒 鶊 庚 賡 赓 廜 廦 廌 麒 鄜 麣 麟 鹿 塵 麠 麜 麎 麙 麢 麏 麚 麛 䴥 麆 麌 麕 麇 麘 麂 麅 麔 麑 麝 麀 鏖 麈 麖 麤 麐 麍 麞 麡 麋 麃 慶 廖 頏 颃 劥 邟 亢 迒 袌 椉 序 袲 廃 廢 邝 廕 亣 亹 裒 廬 店 庛 廮 廁 庘 廛 鄽 廔 庽 褢 庙 廙 亱 褒 鵺 夜 㕻 廠 裦 襃 褏 褎 废 衣 䘚 裔 亦 弈 奕 帟 迹 亪 廡 庭 廭 廫 庖 廯 廨 庝 廋 庾 庥 府 腐 焤 庳 螷 蠯 廏 廆 噟 膺 鹰 鷹 譍 應 底 廇 庀 庍 庅 廞 庣 座 庂 庩 廥 庎 庺 庈 広 廱 六 斌 贇 赟 𨭉 廓 廪 廩 対 廘 庡 產 彥 顏 廍 龐 廊 庐 疒 瘈 瘛 癍 疞 痍 疠 疘 痮 痔 症 瘂 癋 痚 瘏 痣 痦 瘌 瘷 癩 瘶 疴 痘 瘭 癞 痡 病 疳 瘎 瘄 瘽 癱 癀 瘔 疶 癅 瘨 癲 癫 瘼 癘 瘩 痨 痖 痲 痳 疜 疟 疨 疪 疔 疛 疬 痏 痞 痝 疣 癧 瘃 瘞 瘱 痷 療 痓 痙 癗 癨 瘗 痕 瘕 瘬 疿 瘺 癜 癖 痆 疦 疤 瘳 疓 疡 疖 痂 瘸 疗 疲 痉 痛 瘫 癈 瘙 痾 瘾 癃 癮 癊 痱 瘧 痁 疵 㾹 疸 疽 癯 瘍 癭 瘻 瘟 癎 癇 痩 痬 痹 㿔 癳 瘰 癉 癌 㾓 痋 癑 痶 痼 疻 瘑 痐 癏 瘝 瘿 癦 痌 疝 痟 痸 痴 疾 疙 痄 瘇 癪 痢 痵 痜 痿 痗 癤 𤺥 疫 疩 痈 痭 疱 痀 癚 癣 癬 痪 瘓 痑 瘵 疚 疼 瘋 疯 瘦 癙 瘐 㿜 癟 瘪 瘜 痺 瘣 瘊 痽 癄 疧 痻 疷 瘤 疕 癡 瘢 癥 癓 癁 瘲 瘹 疺 痤 疭 痊 癐 瘉 癒 疮 疥 疹 瘡 瘆 痠 瘮 癰 癵 癴 疰 瘯 瘀 癝 癛 瘁 痎 癕 痃 㾦 瘖 瘴 癔 癠 瘒 瘠 痫 痒 瘥 癢 瘘 瘚 瘅 痥 癆 痰 疢 痯 痧 斕 螤 斔 袞 兗 刘 㐫 离 離 応 庠 庰 劆 廉 㢘 剤 鳼 剂 卒 𤭢 顇 雜 頝 効 郊 虠 效 䴔  鵁 交 衮 兖 斏 斒 这 廀 斓 应 文 斊 斋 斈 吝 斍 蚉 螡 齐 斉 斖 斎 鴍 齑 彣 紊 忞 亥 頦 颏 劾 郂 賌 㱾 欬 刻 雍 壅 甕 罋 饔 玄 畜 鄐 玅 玈 玆 牽 率 棄 弃 袬 夣 育 逳 充 立 辛 乵 亲 親 新 辣 辧 辦 竎 瓣 辫 辮 辯 辬 辡 辩 辨 咅 音 章 贑 戅 韴 鄣 韺 頀 贛 戇 赣 戆 竷 彰 遧 韶 童 勭 氃 韻 韷 瓿 竜 韵 歆 嬜 韸 韼 韹 鶕 竸 竟 意 鷾 戠 勏 部 㪗 郶 剖 竒 敨 競 竞 龍 龒 龑 壟 驡 聾 龔 㰍 龏 礱 蠪 鸗 讋 襲 龖 龘 产 亷 産 剷 彦 顔 颜 遃 顡 毅 豙 妾 靖 竍 竱 竵 竦 攱 竡 竰 竑 竮 翊 竳 站 竨 竭 端 竗 竓 竏 竔 竐 竌 竘 竫 颯 飒 鴗 竬 竧 竕 竛 竢 竣 竝 暜 竴 竲 竚 竤 竩 啇 甋 敵 歒 適 劑 韲 齊 齏 齎 齍 齋 齌 商 帝 啻 鶙 遆 旁 覫 郞 良 勆 郎 鿥 郒 剆 朗 塱 欴 户 戻 戾 肈 啔 肁 戺 焈 戹 扇 扉 扂 启 扈 啟 肩 顅 鵳 扁 騗 甂 翩 鶣 遍 帍 扃 棨 肇 啓 晵 綮 㧀 扅 鳸 扄 雇 顧 房 扆 扊 戽 辶 讠 诓 诔 诪 讳 讦 请 试 讲 诫 讵 计 讧 诖 诗 证 诘 诸 语 诃 谭 谏 读 谋 谌 诹 谨 䜩 谍 诺 诂 谳 谟 谎 诬 讶 谮 谐 订 讨 诚 诼 讴 诙 评 记 诀 谬 词 诏 讱 诩 谞 诐 谲 诵 译 讯 让 诽 谑 诅 课 误 谩 谒 谴 谓 谡 谔 识 诇 讷 讪 讣 诮 谠 诎 许 诛 讫 𫍟 诈 诰 诜 话 诱 诿 诲 讬 设 讥 调 询 诡 谵 诌 诤 谗 谄 讽 谀 诞 谢 训 讹 谁 谯 诋 诣 䜣  诟 诉 诳 讻 谶 谖 谣 认 诠 谕 论 诊 讼 谂 诒 诶 访 谆 谅 谇 该 谙 谚 谪 谛 谤 谝 诨 谘 谰 谧 详 谦 谫 谱 谜 谥 说 谈 议 谊 谉 诧 永 昶 冖 冠 冦 冡 軍 顐 皸 鄆 鶤 運 冨 冣 冪 冧 军 皲 郓 写 冢 冝 鼏 幂 冥 鄍 覭 鼆 肎 冚 衤 褉 袆 衦 襀 裱 褠 袜 衧 襫 裓 衭 褄 袿 襓 褂 袺 襭 襶 褤 鿋 襩 褚 褹 裬 袪 褳 褗 褔 褿 襤 襰 袔 裋 褾 褼 襹 補 襋 裲 衼 襵 褀 襼 襔 袣 褋 襽 襪 襺 褡 襟 襻 裢 衬 裖 褥 袏 袚 袥 袹 袻 袸 裿 襧 裌 袴 裺 襦 襑 褪 裉 裙 襁 襈 裾 袂 褘 褶 衪 初 袑 被 褬 裰 襏 衩 裶 裃 裭 褙 褃 袩 衵 袒 袓 裎 褆 襊 襅 襮 裸 裩 褟 裡 裮 褸 褞 襴 襇 襉 裼 褐 衶 袖   襌 襙 裐 襛 裍 裀 䙓 襗 襡 襬 衻 袡 衲 褴 襆 襨 褍 袦 补 裆 襠 褖 袯 袾 袟 袘 衽 襸 褈 複 袮 袄 衱 裯 袍 袧 裪 袇 袀 襜 襐 袳 袶 袼 襷 袝 袱 袙 襣 裨 裇 襖 裑 裫 褓 襥 袵 襍 衹 袛 裄 褫 褷 衫 襎 襳 裕 褑 袷 襝 襘 褕 裣 衯 衸 袗 衳 衿 袊 袎 褦 襂 袽 襢 褲 褯 裤 褵 袨 裗 襯 襱 褅 褊 褌 裈 衴 襕 裥 袐 褨 袢 裷 褛 襚 裞 襒 裧 袉 褣 袕 褝 礻 禊 祷 祎 祙 祴 祆 社 禡 禱 祮 禧 禇 祾 祛 禣 福 禋 禫 禖 祺 禥 䄍 祜 禃 禛 祳 禲 鿆 祓 祏 祐 禰 祬 鿅 禄 祲 祀 禕 祃 礽 祠 祂 祒 祤 祁 禙 祉 禎 祯 祖 禔 禵 祼 禓 視 祦 禢 神 禑 祌 禩 禝 禗 禪 祸 禮 禯 祻 祵 祝 禍 禤 视 祿 禒 礼 祩 祑 祍 祚 祰 禶 祣 祅 祋 禂 祹 礿 祪 祢 祔 禆 祇 祗 祈 禠 祧 禐 祫 禴 禬 祄 禨 祊 禳 禞 禟 祽 禘 禈 祕 祥 禚 禉 禷 禭 禌 祶 禅 祱 冗 冤 冩 冟 隺 鹤 鶴 瓭 邥 鸩 鴆 农 冘 沊 罕 罙 冞 之 㓂 冫 凑 凊 鿑 凄 冮 慿 馮 凴 憑 凟 鿛 凌 鿛 凍 凁 凐 凓 凘 凚 凇 冱 冴 冻 减 冽 冹 冿 冺 决 冯 𪞝 丬 壮 装 状 冲 凅 况 凙 凒 凗 酱 桨 将 螀 奖 浆 醤 奨 妆 冰 冼 凞 凋 净 凂 栥 楶 秶 餈 粢 次 垐 瓷 乲 咨 資 盗 资 姿 恣 准 凖 凝 鹡 鶺 脊 凈 凎 凃 冾 飡 凔 冷 冶 凉 凛 凜 凕 冸 门 闩 闫 闱 闬 闰 闺 阇 阖 阈 阑 闻 阗 闲 鹇 闭 闳 闼 阉 阚 闯 阕 问 间 阒 阘 闸 阊 阓 闾 闽 阃 阛 闿  阄 阎 阁 阋 阀 阍 闪  阌 訚 阏 闹 闶 闵 阂 阆 闷 阙 阐 阅 阔 必 邲 覕 鴓 心 吢 惢 橤 繠 氷 丷 兰 羊 譱 羴 善 鄯 敾 歚 羢 羠 差 齹 羵 𦍩 羬 羱 羥 羺 羞 羓 劷 翔 羟 着 羯 羰 羌 羗 羖 鲝 鮺 䍹 鴹 羝 羏 羳 羷 羭 羒 羚 羧 羶 羻 羪 羦 羜 羫 鯗 养 養 半 美 羛 盖 羲 義 羑 姜 羕 羡 恙 羙 羨 羔 羮 羹 鵥 兿 頖 并 瓶 頩 剏 剙 郱 判 艵 鵧 迸 叛 勌 郑 勬 送 关 龹 駦 桊 豢 弮 巻 韏 卷 券 劵 齤 眷 帣 牶 拳 鲞 鮝 觠 奍 餋 絭 誊 飬 甉 鹣 歉 鶼 兼 酋 尊 鷷 遵 鄭 奠 猷 蠤 遒 前 剪 翦 煎 並 普 精 粖 粔 籵 粻 糦 粩 糐 粳 糟 糮 粞 粓 粸 糂 糤 糒 粠 䊀 糊 糢 糷 糚 糀 𥻗 糣 粃 籿 粝 糲 粨 頪 糎 糆 粫 糥 類 类 粀 粏 糯 粶 粌 糨 糑 糏 粎 粈 粑 籾 糈 籽 糅 糔 籸 粘 粗 糧 粿 糃 粯 粴 粙 糰 粬 糬 糫 粡 籼 粆 糛 断 粍 籺 粚 粁 糙 籷 敉 籶 粋 粣 粅 粷 甐 翷 鄰 亃 斴 粼 遴 糌 粕 糗 粺 糇 粄 糉 粰 糭 粭 糩 粉 纇 颣 糁 糝 籹 数 粧 糖 糠 粇 粹 粒 糡 粮 粐 糄 迷 糕 糋 糍 料 粽 糘 米 粪 畨 糞 粦 娄 麊 屰 朔 塑 槊 遡 愬 欮 逆 首 馘 夔 道 導 噵 遂 㒸 益 蠲 鹢 鷁 兹 甆 孳 鹚 鶿 鷀 慈 弚 弟 剃 鹈 鵜 递 為 兯 为 丫 单 冁 郸 兽 兾 曽 敚 兑 总 𡚁 獘 鐅 斃 彆 暼 鼈 鄨 蹩 蟞 幣 撆 鳖 鱉 鷩 龞 嫳 曾 甑 䎖 鄫 朆 敝 弊 瞥 憋 炐 炜 烒 煹 炬 灴 灶 烓 燒 燽 炡 熕 熺 焼 燌 烤 焃 爀 熆 燵 烜 煿 焐 煏 熰 烥 熞 爁 爦 炣 熛 煙 燂 煉 烳 炳 煤 煁 燍 燁 焟 熯 煂 熿 煠 烘 煳 煵 爤 燤 爡 爟 煐 焫 燪 烵 爑 烞 爩 炑 炢 炼 炖 熸 煯 灯 煘 爄 炦 炻 煩 烦 烠 煗 炋 爏 烼 烣 煃 燎 烴 燸 爧 㸌 燯 烧 煡 燖 燼 熽 煺 煆 炥 焗 爥 煀 炔 烬 炄 煒 𤆵 煝 熠 燿 熮 熤 炀 灺 灱 㶸 燲 熁 炤 烃 煣 燏 熥 燈 邩 爐 爈 炶 焯 爘 燦 炟 焊 煶 爠 熶 熚 爗 爆 焜 煬 燳 炠 焻 熡 煴 熳 焨 爛 燗 爓 熌 燘 燜 熀 煋 焺 焬 燝 煜 畑 熼 煨 煟 焒 熉 煰 燀 燥 焆 烛 爞 燶 焑 炾 炽 烟 煾 炴 煱 燡 燭 熅 爅 烔 炯 烱 焵 焹 爜 灿 煓 熴 熣 灲 炒 熦 焇 爣 龦 炪 熂 炧 炸 烶 焅 㸆 烍 煄 燻 爋 熪 煍 秌 烸 灹 炇 燆 炈 㶲 焩 炮 煼 灼 烿 龽 焕 煥 焔 焰 炊 燃 烽 熢 烙 炵 煈 煅 燬 烌 烻 煌 熄 熓 焷 爍 燩 烅 熜 燠 烨 焳 燋 烁 焝 熘 炘 焮 炿 烐 炍 烆 烯 烑 燔 烀 焀 煖 烰 爝 熎 熖 燰 烇 烩 烚 熻 爚 燴 炝 炌 炂 焧 熗 焓 炩 焾 炲 焌 爉 炷 焞 燉 爙 熇 燺 煷 燷 燣 炞 爌 熫 煻 焿 熝 𤏶 爊 炕 焲 燫 焠 烄 炆 烗 炫 焴 焙 燑 燱 熾 爖 熵 烺 炉 煽 熩 煸 煇 熐 㶶 焖 烂 烊 爔 燨 烪 熑 煪 燇 燐 燧 煫 焍 熷 顃 郯 敥 煔 覢 剡 欻 鶑 顲 瑩 禜 塋 醟 檾 榮 甇 勞 憥 煢 覮 營 螢 膋 嵤 滎 犖 罃 焭 鶯 鎣 縈 嫈 謍 褮 熒 燊 歘 飊 爃 燚 炎 炏 烾 炓 烷 煊 爎 熍 烢 焥 炨 焢 焪 熔 火 烡 灷 炛 灮 焱 州 义 斗 乧 头 宀 㝉 害 割 鶷 豁 憲 実 寈 寚 宝 寶 寳 塞 騫 寨 弿 骞 寋 賽 蹇 赛 搴 鶱 謇 褰 寒 宇 宗 賨 崈 鶎 宑 鵍 完 寇 𡨥 宼 寁 宯 定 顁 宣 翧 寭 寅 戭 富 宦 㝡 寘 宧 寛 寬 寞 宽 賓 顮 宋 宁 守 宸 宬 宕 寡 寕 宥 宠 宏 翝 家 寄 宊 寮 室 宭 宆 宖 賔 寥 字 宻 寷 寂 寊 宜 寔 审 寠 寓 宲 宺 宴 官 逭 悹 宙 宫 宮 寰 宐 宵 實 寐 寤 寎 寢 寱 寣 㲾 牢 宒 宪 宅 宎 鴧 宂 宄 寃 寏 剜 鹓 鵷 宛 惌 額 额 察 客 愙 寫 宾 㝛 宿 寑 宱 寉 寯 它 寲 迱 寙 窫 穻 穽 窛 窺 窥 空 窾 窐 竃 竈 竇 竀 窙 窢 𥥷 窉 窦 窍 鵼 窷 窴 穼 窀 穿 窃 窚 鶟 突 竂 窒 窘 穹 窟 穵 穷 窡 窿 宨 窧 窅 窠 窤 窶 窜 窝 𥦗 窩 帘 窹 窋 窂 窑 竁 窄 窖 覾 宷 審 穾 究 窇 窎 窞 穸 竄 窵 鴪 竅 窗 窻 窮 竆 窱 窌 窽 窳 窊 窆 窕 彮 竊 窸 窰 窬 容 窈 梥 窓 窼 窣 窔 窨 竉 窯 窲 寀 窭 邃 寪 窏 窪 穴 安 鞌 案 頞 鴳 宔 宍 宰 寴 寵 寝 宓 蜜 寗 密 寍 寧 鸋 寜 甯 宩 叜 灾 实 寖 㝠 氵 沣 洭 湱 潔 滟 洡 涛 淎 湊 湷 溙 溱 汗 汪 潖 濏 滶 漬 渍 清 瀞 濪 淸 溸 溝 沫 沬 汚 污 汙 盓 沶 汧 汫 沅 潜 濽 添 沄 浅 淒 洰 渠 洟 汁 江 汢 涱 洼 溤 澆 湗 溨 洔 濤 泟 瀐 漹 洁 瀻 溒 澍 澎 渽 瀆 濆 𣸣 洘 涍 漖 泋 渚 浾 淕 淩 法 溘 潱 瀔 瀫 濲 涜 澾 涬 洹 漸 壍 聻 魙 嬱 瀭 漣 漙 潓 涷 溥 浭 淢 滒 浯 湢 漚 滆 瀜 漕 瀶 濫 灠 瀬 溂 潄 瀨 濑 漱 涑 灢 河 浢 漂 湮 溧 潭 潥 洒 酒 灑 湅 浦 𡏋 沞 沛 洅 洓 渎 汥 澒 鸿 鴻 泔 洱 灄 滠 湈 淇 湛 澌 濝 澕 濭 漌 灘 漢 潢 灆 渮 潵 満 滿 懣 满 懑 泄 渫 澑 渃 洪 鍙 港 漭 沽 淔 滇 鿰 漧 潮 澣 瀚 濣 瀟 潇 洍 湖 湳 淽 漠 濗 灡 澫 渵 灌 渶 瀎 滞 濍 濩 溚 濸 淓 瀳 滢 濛 溁 涝 潆 溍 沔 溎 濋 淋 澿 漜 澘 潸 滼 漤 湘 灪 湐 淅 涁 濇 淶 瀒 漆 淞 沐 泍 渿 潹 渣 沭 浡 渤 溹 汇 涟 沍 渐 沌 灊 潛 汅 沏 沘 湝 泧 柒 汀 浙 湁 浗 浱 溽 滣 漘 涯 減 澸 濿 滅 沥 洌 沷 沰 洦 湏 湹 瀀 湎 洧 洏 渜 洊 滯 懘 滙 浝 泷 沋 瀝 源 汯 瀦 涿 渏 濔 沤 㵐 洃 漺 浹  汏 洿 渀 㵮 淹 㳒 汱 汰 潦 溼 洷 涇 湽 澐 灞 瀮 灀 濡 瀖 澪 泙 涞 浃 浇 淺 浳 津 堻 湕 澅 潯 浔 濜 潚 泿 溉 渌 涒 浸 溊 澉 漲 渳 瀰 漒 涨 沸 泓 溺 泯 湣 汜 潠 潳 漏 澱 涺 渥 潺 澼 涮 灟 漽 淈 㳮 浘 泦 泥 埿 沢 決 浕 沑 湋 湄 瀷 漝 濯 漻 瀥 濢 瀈 溋 汤 烫 泀 汈 池 氾 𣱼 氻 沼 泇 鿄 澀 涩 梁 涊 粱 湑 汓 洆 涵 錃 波 碆 婆 泾 汿 澦 滪 渘 潏 涰 湧 涌 慂 滩 溌 湀 澄 潑 汉 泽 汊 溞 瀡 泐 濻 漋 滁 汛 渄 灃 灩 灧 淑 泸 澽 澞 瀘 濾 淲 滮 滹 滤 沚 濊 澁 涉 瀕 濒 渉 渋 沾 淖 湞 惉 浈 滷 泚 澯 瀣 濬 汨 汩 泹 沮 泪 涆 淂 淏 湨 浧 涅 塣 溡 濐 湜 灈 滭 瀑 渺 淉 濎 混 湯 璗 盪 燙 濉 涀 浿 濺 瀴 瀃 測 洖 涠 溻 浬 濹 淐 漊 温 漫 澷 潤 瀾 澖 澗 灛 濶 㵎 灁 潣 灍 湡 湒 濈 湿 澠 滉 湦 渇 渴 濕 灦 澋 灝 灏 渂 洩 浥 沖 沺 油 潩 涄 渨 淠 潰 瀢 灅 㶟 溃 渭 潞 溭 浞 漯 溿 湂 溳 渑 漍 潬 澡 澏 漶 涢 涓 涡 浊 渱 灗 浀 澧 灎 灔 濃 淟 涸 涃 況 溷 洇 泱 潿 渦 濄 滑 洄 濖 澤 澴 瀱 濁 潀 潈 泗 泅 溅 溫 测 潶 洞 泂 汭 浻 滥 澲 灇 濧 汕 澂 滍 溰 漄 溦 湍 湠 潉 漰 溄 漼 涔 潂 漴 浉 沙 桬 硰 乷 渻 挲 鲨 鯊 娑 裟 逤 洸 溑 消 淌 漟 澢 灙 淥 湪 泏 泼 泤 渁 涾 汽 滊 汻 汼 泩 淛 潕 洙 湃 潅 潪 泆 汔 沲 汘 泎 涏 浩 涶 濳 灒 洗 鍌 漡 湩 溗 活 浰 潲 瀩 潻 湫 涹 瀿 海 塰 汑 涐 鋈 沃 澨 潷 瀄 滗 汲 没 沿 氿 染 汎 盕 淝 淜 淍 泡 沒 泃 洵 淘 沕 淴 洶 沟 汋 渹 浵 汮 淗 洈 澹 浄 㴔 瀺 渔 澛 漁 瀂 浼 潒 涣 渙 沵 澥 淊 㳄 盜 汐 滐 洺 漈 濥 汷 汣 浲 漨 洚 涤 湰 洛 泈 洬 渢 沨 汍 灚 沜 湼 澙 溲 潟 淣 浜 涎 泭 洑 浌 泊 洎 湟 溴 濞 滜 溩 淿 湶 洢 渒 澔 漑 溾 濼 激 溮 渪 洫 潨 漗 澚 澳 汌 淵 鼝 湺 濮 浟 滺 滌 滫 𣴓 沎 溣 淮 準 潗 潐 涖 泺 泲 汦 涽 泜 泖 溜 瀏 沂 垽 洉 峾 泝 溵 洀 瀊 汳 洐 漇 瀓 澓 潃 漎 沠 泒 派 湚 潴 漪 溆 潊 漵 瀲 淆 浠 潋 泛 洮 汹 渊 潘 泘 瀸 㳇 滏 浴 湲 渓 濦 浖 㶁 淨 浮 漞 灂 滛 淫 潙 滔 㶉 鸂 溪 浽 涭 汃 汄 洤 涻 淦 涂 塗 浍 洽 㽏 渰 潝 瀹 澰 澮 渝 淪 沧 汾 湓 涗 洕 沦 沴 㳂 滃 湌 滄 汵 浛 泠 淰 潍 泑 濰 渗 治 洠 涘 沇 浚 滲 汝 洳 漅 㴩 灉 淄 滸 灤 灣 注 乼 汸 湤 漩 游 淤 鿌 滖 涥 淳 漷 潡 湻 瀼 滈 涼 渟 濠 湸 澶 澟 瀤 滦 湾 汴 汒 灜 瀛 渡 瀇 灖 滽 溏 漮 灋 漉 瀌 沆 瀍 液 洂 湙 滾 渷 浏 漓 灕 濂 淬 滧 洨 滚 汶 济 済 澭 泫 滀 淯 澈 流 瑬 鎏 㳘 泣 瀙 澵 涪 湆 漳 灨 潼 滝 滰 澺 湇 瀧 浐 濓 滻 淁 滴 濟 滳 渧 滂 浪 沪 淭 涙 淚 滬 浒 泳 溕 渾 浑 泻 溟 沉 浓 沈 浫 滘 深 澬 润 澜 涧 泌 沁 洋 溠 溬 瀁 泮 渼 湵 漾 㵪 溔 洴 渆 渕 浂 淃 漛 潫 溓 湭 澊 湔 湴 潽 洣 瀵 潾 溇 溯 渞 澻 溢 滋 濨 涕 溈 沩 涚 潧 潎 瀅 濚 澇 瀯 濴 灐 瀠 濙 淡 洲 瀗 瀽 淙 浣 滱 淀 渲 演 濱 浨 泞 浤 涋 濅 濵 漃 渖 涫 浶 涴 瀉 滨 沱 涳 漥 湥 潌 瀋 溛 溶 泬 洝 滓 淧 滵 濘 澝 㴱 浺 湉 忄 懳 恇 忓 忹 慠 情 愫 恜 怽 悈 怃 忨 愜 悿 忶 恸 惬 悽 怇 恞 悵 憢 恃 懤 怔 懴 恄 愩 懛 憘 憉 憤 愤 懗 恅 愭 怯 悻 恒 慚 慩 慱 憓 愽 愝 惐 悟 愊 慪 慒 慳 懢 懶 懒 悚 慓 慄 憛 憟 恓 恆 悑 怲 忮 懾 慑 愖 惜 慬 懄 愅 慲 怈 惵 怙 慎 愺 慔 懽 愥 懱 懵 懜 懂 憽 恾 慌 懞 憷 惏 懎 怵 悖 懥 惭 忳 憯 悂 怴 忊 忖 惰 墯 憾 恹 慽 恠 懨 懮 愐 怖 愞 怀 怌 忧 怄 恢 慡 悏 忕 恗 忲 憭 恎 懦 怦 憳 恨 慨 怫 惤 愵 怋 惽 忋 怩 快 忸 愇 慴 憀 忆 忚 忉 忇 恊 愶 怊 怶 忬 憰 惙 愑 悀 憕 怿 怪 慅 憜 悱 懅 憈 懻 怗 悼 怛 怚 悍 惧 悜 惿 懼 戄 懪 惈 惃 愓 悓 惻 悮 悝 慺 愠 慢 憪 憫 憴 愰 惺 惕 愒 憬 悒 忡 怞 愄 憒 愦 愢 愕 愪 慖 憚 懆 悁 𢥞 憹 㥏 悃 悞 怳 㥵 怾 怏 愲 恛 懌 懁 愣 怬 慍 恻 恫 惘 悭 愷 惴 恺 慛 恍 悄 惝 憆 戃 慣 惯 忾 愾 忤 性 憮 怢 忔 忏 怍 悎 慥 慯 慟 愎 恬 悧 愀 悸 悔 怅 憍 憡 忣 忰 忛 惆 怉 怐 恂 惸  惚 愡 恟 恑 憺  悗 愌 懈 惂 忺 恀 憏 恪 懙 恘 怕 惶 愧 憿 恤 憁 懊 恦 惟 愯 懏 憔 忯 惛 怟 懰 恉 愼 懝 忻 惞 懫 悕 恡 恌 忷 惾 憣 懺 愋 懚 愮 慆 慀 懓 恮 惍 悇 恰 憸 懀 愉 惀 怆 悅 忦 忪 慃 恱 愴 忴 怜 惗 怮 惨 怡 恈 悛 慘 怓 惱 悙 惇 憞 懹 惊 憱 懔 憻 懍 懷 懐 忭 忙 懭 戂 懡 慵 慷 忼 惦 愱 恼 悴 恔 忟 悋 㤥 怰 慉 愔 慞 憧 憶 懠 悢 悷 惼 怺 惲 恽 慏 忱 悯 怭 懩 怑 恲 惓 慻 慊 憐 悌 惮 悦 憎 憦 惔 悰 愃 悺 㤞 惋 愘 悾 愹 懧 悩 厳 兴 举 挙 誉 単 戦 巣 畄 獣 鼡 黉 栄 労 学 敩 覚 営 蛍 觉 峃 泶 喾 鸴 鲎 鴬 灬 ㇏ 〇

YES sorting has also been applied to the indexing of all the characters in Xinhua Zidian and Xiandai Hanyu Cidian.
