= List of CJK Unified Ideographs, part 4 of 4 =

CJK Unified Ideographs (Part 4 of 4)^{[1]} Official Unicode Consortium code chart (PDF)
	0	1	2	3	4	5	6	7	8	9	A	B	C	D	E	F
U+8D0x	贀	贁	贂	贃	贄	贅	贆	贇	贈	贉	贊	贋	贌	贍	贎	贏
U+8D1x	贐	贑	贒	贓	贔	贕	贖	贗	贘	贙	贚	贛	贜	贝	贞	负
U+8D2x	贠	贡	财	责	贤	败	账	货	质	贩	贪	贫	贬	购	贮	贯
U+8D3x	贰	贱	贲	贳	贴	贵	贶	贷	贸	费	贺	贻	贼	贽	贾	贿
U+8D4x	赀	赁	赂	赃	资	赅	赆	赇	赈	赉	赊	赋	赌	赍	赎	赏
U+8D5x	赐	赑	赒	赓	赔	赕	赖	赗	赘	赙	赚	赛	赜	赝	赞	赟
U+8D6x	赠	赡	赢	赣	赤	赥	赦	赧	赨	赩	赪	赫	赬	赭	赮	赯
U+8D7x	走	赱	赲	赳	赴	赵	赶	起	赸	赹	赺	赻	赼	赽	赾	赿
U+8D8x	趀	趁	趂	趃	趄	超	趆	趇	趈	趉	越	趋	趌	趍	趎	趏
U+8D9x	趐	趑	趒	趓	趔	趕	趖	趗	趘	趙	趚	趛	趜	趝	趞	趟
U+8DAx	趠	趡	趢	趣	趤	趥	趦	趧	趨	趩	趪	趫	趬	趭	趮	趯
U+8DBx	趰	趱	趲	足	趴	趵	趶	趷	趸	趹	趺	趻	趼	趽	趾	趿
U+8DCx	跀	跁	跂	跃	跄	跅	跆	跇	跈	跉	跊	跋	跌	跍	跎	跏
U+8DDx	跐	跑	跒	跓	跔	跕	跖	跗	跘	跙	跚	跛	跜	距	跞	跟
U+8DEx	跠	跡	跢	跣	跤	跥	跦	跧	跨	跩	跪	跫	跬	跭	跮	路
U+8DFx	跰	跱	跲	跳	跴	践	跶	跷	跸	跹	跺	跻	跼	跽	跾	跿
U+8E0x	踀	踁	踂	踃	踄	踅	踆	踇	踈	踉	踊	踋	踌	踍	踎	踏
U+8E1x	踐	踑	踒	踓	踔	踕	踖	踗	踘	踙	踚	踛	踜	踝	踞	踟
U+8E2x	踠	踡	踢	踣	踤	踥	踦	踧	踨	踩	踪	踫	踬	踭	踮	踯
U+8E3x	踰	踱	踲	踳	踴	踵	踶	踷	踸	踹	踺	踻	踼	踽	踾	踿
U+8E4x	蹀	蹁	蹂	蹃	蹄	蹅	蹆	蹇	蹈	蹉	蹊	蹋	蹌	蹍	蹎	蹏
U+8E5x	蹐	蹑	蹒	蹓	蹔	蹕	蹖	蹗	蹘	蹙	蹚	蹛	蹜	蹝	蹞	蹟
U+8E6x	蹠	蹡	蹢	蹣	蹤	蹥	蹦	蹧	蹨	蹩	蹪	蹫	蹬	蹭	蹮	蹯
U+8E7x	蹰	蹱	蹲	蹳	蹴	蹵	蹶	蹷	蹸	蹹	蹺	蹻	蹼	蹽	蹾	蹿
U+8E8x	躀	躁	躂	躃	躄	躅	躆	躇	躈	躉	躊	躋	躌	躍	躎	躏
U+8E9x	躐	躑	躒	躓	躔	躕	躖	躗	躘	躙	躚	躛	躜	躝	躞	躟
U+8EAx	躠	躡	躢	躣	躤	躥	躦	躧	躨	躩	躪	身	躬	躭	躮	躯
U+8EBx	躰	躱	躲	躳	躴	躵	躶	躷	躸	躹	躺	躻	躼	躽	躾	躿
U+8ECx	軀	軁	軂	軃	軄	軅	軆	軇	軈	軉	車	軋	軌	軍	軎	軏
U+8EDx	軐	軑	軒	軓	軔	軕	軖	軗	軘	軙	軚	軛	軜	軝	軞	軟
U+8EEx	軠	軡	転	軣	軤	軥	軦	軧	軨	軩	軪	軫	軬	軭	軮	軯
U+8EFx	軰	軱	軲	軳	軴	軵	軶	軷	軸	軹	軺	軻	軼	軽	軾	軿
U+8F0x	輀	輁	輂	較	輄	輅	輆	輇	輈	載	輊	輋	輌	輍	輎	輏
U+8F1x	輐	輑	輒	輓	輔	輕	輖	輗	輘	輙	輚	輛	輜	輝	輞	輟
U+8F2x	輠	輡	輢	輣	輤	輥	輦	輧	輨	輩	輪	輫	輬	輭	輮	輯
U+8F3x	輰	輱	輲	輳	輴	輵	輶	輷	輸	輹	輺	輻	輼	輽	輾	輿
U+8F4x	轀	轁	轂	轃	轄	轅	轆	轇	轈	轉	轊	轋	轌	轍	轎	轏
U+8F5x	轐	轑	轒	轓	轔	轕	轖	轗	轘	轙	轚	轛	轜	轝	轞	轟
U+8F6x	轠	轡	轢	轣	轤	轥	车	轧	轨	轩	轪	轫	转	轭	轮	软
U+8F7x	轰	轱	轲	轳	轴	轵	轶	轷	轸	轹	轺	轻	轼	载	轾	轿
U+8F8x	辀	辁	辂	较	辄	辅	辆	辇	辈	辉	辊	辋	辌	辍	辎	辏
U+8F9x	辐	辑	辒	输	辔	辕	辖	辗	辘	辙	辚	辛	辜	辝	辞	辟
U+8FAx	辠	辡	辢	辣	辤	辥	辦	辧	辨	辩	辪	辫	辬	辭	辮	辯
U+8FBx	辰	辱	農	辳	辴	辵	辶	辷	辸	边	辺	辻	込	辽	达	辿
U+8FCx	迀	迁	迂	迃	迄	迅	迆	过	迈	迉	迊	迋	迌	迍	迎	迏
U+8FDx	运	近	迒	迓	返	迕	迖	迗	还	这	迚	进	远	违	连	迟
U+8FEx	迠	迡	迢	迣	迤	迥	迦	迧	迨	迩	迪	迫	迬	迭	迮	迯
U+8FFx	述	迱	迲	迳	迴	迵	迶	迷	迸	迹	迺	迻	迼	追	迾	迿
U+900x	退	送	适	逃	逄	逅	逆	逇	逈	选	逊	逋	逌	逍	逎	透
U+901x	逐	逑	递	逓	途	逕	逖	逗	逘	這	通	逛	逜	逝	逞	速
U+902x	造	逡	逢	連	逤	逥	逦	逧	逨	逩	逪	逫	逬	逭	逮	逯
U+903x	逰	週	進	逳	逴	逵	逶	逷	逸	逹	逺	逻	逼	逽	逾	逿
U+904x	遀	遁	遂	遃	遄	遅	遆	遇	遈	遉	遊	運	遌	遍	過	遏
U+905x	遐	遑	遒	道	達	違	遖	遗	遘	遙	遚	遛	遜	遝	遞	遟
U+906x	遠	遡	遢	遣	遤	遥	遦	遧	遨	適	遪	遫	遬	遭	遮	遯
U+907x	遰	遱	遲	遳	遴	遵	遶	遷	選	遹	遺	遻	遼	遽	遾	避
U+908x	邀	邁	邂	邃	還	邅	邆	邇	邈	邉	邊	邋	邌	邍	邎	邏
U+909x	邐	邑	邒	邓	邔	邕	邖	邗	邘	邙	邚	邛	邜	邝	邞	邟
U+90Ax	邠	邡	邢	那	邤	邥	邦	邧	邨	邩	邪	邫	邬	邭	邮	邯
U+90Bx	邰	邱	邲	邳	邴	邵	邶	邷	邸	邹	邺	邻	邼	邽	邾	邿
U+90Cx	郀	郁	郂	郃	郄	郅	郆	郇	郈	郉	郊	郋	郌	郍	郎	郏
U+90Dx	郐	郑	郒	郓	郔	郕	郖	郗	郘	郙	郚	郛	郜	郝	郞	郟
U+90Ex	郠	郡	郢	郣	郤	郥	郦	郧	部	郩	郪	郫	郬	郭	郮	郯
U+90Fx	郰	郱	郲	郳	郴	郵	郶	郷	郸	郹	郺	郻	郼	都	郾	郿
U+910x	鄀	鄁	鄂	鄃	鄄	鄅	鄆	鄇	鄈	鄉	鄊	鄋	鄌	鄍	鄎	鄏
U+911x	鄐	鄑	鄒	鄓	鄔	鄕	鄖	鄗	鄘	鄙	鄚	鄛	鄜	鄝	鄞	鄟
U+912x	鄠	鄡	鄢	鄣	鄤	鄥	鄦	鄧	鄨	鄩	鄪	鄫	鄬	鄭	鄮	鄯
U+913x	鄰	鄱	鄲	鄳	鄴	鄵	鄶	鄷	鄸	鄹	鄺	鄻	鄼	鄽	鄾	鄿
U+914x	酀	酁	酂	酃	酄	酅	酆	酇	酈	酉	酊	酋	酌	配	酎	酏
U+915x	酐	酑	酒	酓	酔	酕	酖	酗	酘	酙	酚	酛	酜	酝	酞	酟
U+916x	酠	酡	酢	酣	酤	酥	酦	酧	酨	酩	酪	酫	酬	酭	酮	酯
U+917x	酰	酱	酲	酳	酴	酵	酶	酷	酸	酹	酺	酻	酼	酽	酾	酿
U+918x	醀	醁	醂	醃	醄	醅	醆	醇	醈	醉	醊	醋	醌	醍	醎	醏
U+919x	醐	醑	醒	醓	醔	醕	醖	醗	醘	醙	醚	醛	醜	醝	醞	醟
U+91Ax	醠	醡	醢	醣	醤	醥	醦	醧	醨	醩	醪	醫	醬	醭	醮	醯
U+91Bx	醰	醱	醲	醳	醴	醵	醶	醷	醸	醹	醺	醻	醼	醽	醾	醿
U+91Cx	釀	釁	釂	釃	釄	釅	釆	采	釈	釉	释	釋	里	重	野	量
U+91Dx	釐	金	釒	釓	釔	釕	釖	釗	釘	釙	釚	釛	釜	針	釞	釟
U+91Ex	釠	釡	釢	釣	釤	釥	釦	釧	釨	釩	釪	釫	釬	釭	釮	釯
U+91Fx	釰	釱	釲	釳	釴	釵	釶	釷	釸	釹	釺	釻	釼	釽	釾	釿
U+920x	鈀	鈁	鈂	鈃	鈄	鈅	鈆	鈇	鈈	鈉	鈊	鈋	鈌	鈍	鈎	鈏
U+921x	鈐	鈑	鈒	鈓	鈔	鈕	鈖	鈗	鈘	鈙	鈚	鈛	鈜	鈝	鈞	鈟
U+922x	鈠	鈡	鈢	鈣	鈤	鈥	鈦	鈧	鈨	鈩	鈪	鈫	鈬	鈭	鈮	鈯
U+923x	鈰	鈱	鈲	鈳	鈴	鈵	鈶	鈷	鈸	鈹	鈺	鈻	鈼	鈽	鈾	鈿
U+924x	鉀	鉁	鉂	鉃	鉄	鉅	鉆	鉇	鉈	鉉	鉊	鉋	鉌	鉍	鉎	鉏
U+925x	鉐	鉑	鉒	鉓	鉔	鉕	鉖	鉗	鉘	鉙	鉚	鉛	鉜	鉝	鉞	鉟
U+926x	鉠	鉡	鉢	鉣	鉤	鉥	鉦	鉧	鉨	鉩	鉪	鉫	鉬	鉭	鉮	鉯
U+927x	鉰	鉱	鉲	鉳	鉴	鉵	鉶	鉷	鉸	鉹	鉺	鉻	鉼	鉽	鉾	鉿
U+928x	銀	銁	銂	銃	銄	銅	銆	銇	銈	銉	銊	銋	銌	銍	銎	銏
U+929x	銐	銑	銒	銓	銔	銕	銖	銗	銘	銙	銚	銛	銜	銝	銞	銟
U+92Ax	銠	銡	銢	銣	銤	銥	銦	銧	銨	銩	銪	銫	銬	銭	銮	銯
U+92Bx	銰	銱	銲	銳	銴	銵	銶	銷	銸	銹	銺	銻	銼	銽	銾	銿
U+92Cx	鋀	鋁	鋂	鋃	鋄	鋅	鋆	鋇	鋈	鋉	鋊	鋋	鋌	鋍	鋎	鋏
U+92Dx	鋐	鋑	鋒	鋓	鋔	鋕	鋖	鋗	鋘	鋙	鋚	鋛	鋜	鋝	鋞	鋟
U+92Ex	鋠	鋡	鋢	鋣	鋤	鋥	鋦	鋧	鋨	鋩	鋪	鋫	鋬	鋭	鋮	鋯
U+92Fx	鋰	鋱	鋲	鋳	鋴	鋵	鋶	鋷	鋸	鋹	鋺	鋻	鋼	鋽	鋾	鋿
U+930x	錀	錁	錂	錃	錄	錅	錆	錇	錈	錉	錊	錋	錌	錍	錎	錏
U+931x	錐	錑	錒	錓	錔	錕	錖	錗	錘	錙	錚	錛	錜	錝	錞	錟
U+932x	錠	錡	錢	錣	錤	錥	錦	錧	錨	錩	錪	錫	錬	錭	錮	錯
U+933x	錰	錱	録	錳	錴	錵	錶	錷	錸	錹	錺	錻	錼	錽	錾	錿
U+934x	鍀	鍁	鍂	鍃	鍄	鍅	鍆	鍇	鍈	鍉	鍊	鍋	鍌	鍍	鍎	鍏
U+935x	鍐	鍑	鍒	鍓	鍔	鍕	鍖	鍗	鍘	鍙	鍚	鍛	鍜	鍝	鍞	鍟
U+936x	鍠	鍡	鍢	鍣	鍤	鍥	鍦	鍧	鍨	鍩	鍪	鍫	鍬	鍭	鍮	鍯
U+937x	鍰	鍱	鍲	鍳	鍴	鍵	鍶	鍷	鍸	鍹	鍺	鍻	鍼	鍽	鍾	鍿
U+938x	鎀	鎁	鎂	鎃	鎄	鎅	鎆	鎇	鎈	鎉	鎊	鎋	鎌	鎍	鎎	鎏
U+939x	鎐	鎑	鎒	鎓	鎔	鎕	鎖	鎗	鎘	鎙	鎚	鎛	鎜	鎝	鎞	鎟
U+93Ax	鎠	鎡	鎢	鎣	鎤	鎥	鎦	鎧	鎨	鎩	鎪	鎫	鎬	鎭	鎮	鎯
U+93Bx	鎰	鎱	鎲	鎳	鎴	鎵	鎶	鎷	鎸	鎹	鎺	鎻	鎼	鎽	鎾	鎿
U+93Cx	鏀	鏁	鏂	鏃	鏄	鏅	鏆	鏇	鏈	鏉	鏊	鏋	鏌	鏍	鏎	鏏
U+93Dx	鏐	鏑	鏒	鏓	鏔	鏕	鏖	鏗	鏘	鏙	鏚	鏛	鏜	鏝	鏞	鏟
U+93Ex	鏠	鏡	鏢	鏣	鏤	鏥	鏦	鏧	鏨	鏩	鏪	鏫	鏬	鏭	鏮	鏯
U+93Fx	鏰	鏱	鏲	鏳	鏴	鏵	鏶	鏷	鏸	鏹	鏺	鏻	鏼	鏽	鏾	鏿
U+940x	鐀	鐁	鐂	鐃	鐄	鐅	鐆	鐇	鐈	鐉	鐊	鐋	鐌	鐍	鐎	鐏
U+941x	鐐	鐑	鐒	鐓	鐔	鐕	鐖	鐗	鐘	鐙	鐚	鐛	鐜	鐝	鐞	鐟
U+942x	鐠	鐡	鐢	鐣	鐤	鐥	鐦	鐧	鐨	鐩	鐪	鐫	鐬	鐭	鐮	鐯
U+943x	鐰	鐱	鐲	鐳	鐴	鐵	鐶	鐷	鐸	鐹	鐺	鐻	鐼	鐽	鐾	鐿
U+944x	鑀	鑁	鑂	鑃	鑄	鑅	鑆	鑇	鑈	鑉	鑊	鑋	鑌	鑍	鑎	鑏
U+945x	鑐	鑑	鑒	鑓	鑔	鑕	鑖	鑗	鑘	鑙	鑚	鑛	鑜	鑝	鑞	鑟
U+946x	鑠	鑡	鑢	鑣	鑤	鑥	鑦	鑧	鑨	鑩	鑪	鑫	鑬	鑭	鑮	鑯
U+947x	鑰	鑱	鑲	鑳	鑴	鑵	鑶	鑷	鑸	鑹	鑺	鑻	鑼	鑽	鑾	鑿
U+948x	钀	钁	钂	钃	钄	钅	钆	钇	针	钉	钊	钋	钌	钍	钎	钏
U+949x	钐	钑	钒	钓	钔	钕	钖	钗	钘	钙	钚	钛	钜	钝	钞	钟
U+94Ax	钠	钡	钢	钣	钤	钥	钦	钧	钨	钩	钪	钫	钬	钭	钮	钯
U+94Bx	钰	钱	钲	钳	钴	钵	钶	钷	钸	钹	钺	钻	钼	钽	钾	钿
U+94Cx	铀	铁	铂	铃	铄	铅	铆	铇	铈	铉	铊	铋	铌	铍	铎	铏
U+94Dx	铐	铑	铒	铓	铔	铕	铖	铗	铘	铙	铚	铛	铜	铝	铞	铟
U+94Ex	铠	铡	铢	铣	铤	铥	铦	铧	铨	铩	铪	铫	铬	铭	铮	铯
U+94Fx	铰	铱	铲	铳	铴	铵	银	铷	铸	铹	铺	铻	铼	铽	链	铿
U+950x	销	锁	锂	锃	锄	锅	锆	锇	锈	锉	锊	锋	锌	锍	锎	锏
U+951x	锐	锑	锒	锓	锔	锕	锖	锗	锘	错	锚	锛	锜	锝	锞	锟
U+952x	锠	锡	锢	锣	锤	锥	锦	锧	锨	锩	锪	锫	锬	锭	键	锯
U+953x	锰	锱	锲	锳	锴	锵	锶	锷	锸	锹	锺	锻	锼	锽	锾	锿
U+954x	镀	镁	镂	镃	镄	镅	镆	镇	镈	镉	镊	镋	镌	镍	镎	镏
U+955x	镐	镑	镒	镓	镔	镕	镖	镗	镘	镙	镚	镛	镜	镝	镞	镟
U+956x	镠	镡	镢	镣	镤	镥	镦	镧	镨	镩	镪	镫	镬	镭	镮	镯
U+957x	镰	镱	镲	镳	镴	镵	镶	長	镸	镹	镺	镻	镼	镽	镾	长
U+958x	門	閁	閂	閃	閄	閅	閆	閇	閈	閉	閊	開	閌	閍	閎	閏
U+959x	閐	閑	閒	間	閔	閕	閖	閗	閘	閙	閚	閛	閜	閝	閞	閟
U+95Ax	閠	閡	関	閣	閤	閥	閦	閧	閨	閩	閪	閫	閬	閭	閮	閯
U+95Bx	閰	閱	閲	閳	閴	閵	閶	閷	閸	閹	閺	閻	閼	閽	閾	閿
U+95Cx	闀	闁	闂	闃	闄	闅	闆	闇	闈	闉	闊	闋	闌	闍	闎	闏
U+95Dx	闐	闑	闒	闓	闔	闕	闖	闗	闘	闙	闚	闛	關	闝	闞	闟
U+95Ex	闠	闡	闢	闣	闤	闥	闦	闧	门	闩	闪	闫	闬	闭	问	闯
U+95Fx	闰	闱	闲	闳	间	闵	闶	闷	闸	闹	闺	闻	闼	闽	闾	闿
U+960x	阀	阁	阂	阃	阄	阅	阆	阇	阈	阉	阊	阋	阌	阍	阎	阏
U+961x	阐	阑	阒	阓	阔	阕	阖	阗	阘	阙	阚	阛	阜	阝	阞	队
U+962x	阠	阡	阢	阣	阤	阥	阦	阧	阨	阩	阪	阫	阬	阭	阮	阯
U+963x	阰	阱	防	阳	阴	阵	阶	阷	阸	阹	阺	阻	阼	阽	阾	阿
U+964x	陀	陁	陂	陃	附	际	陆	陇	陈	陉	陊	陋	陌	降	陎	陏
U+965x	限	陑	陒	陓	陔	陕	陖	陗	陘	陙	陚	陛	陜	陝	陞	陟
U+966x	陠	陡	院	陣	除	陥	陦	陧	陨	险	陪	陫	陬	陭	陮	陯
U+967x	陰	陱	陲	陳	陴	陵	陶	陷	陸	陹	険	陻	陼	陽	陾	陿
U+968x	隀	隁	隂	隃	隄	隅	隆	隇	隈	隉	隊	隋	隌	隍	階	随
U+969x	隐	隑	隒	隓	隔	隕	隖	隗	隘	隙	隚	際	障	隝	隞	隟
U+96Ax	隠	隡	隢	隣	隤	隥	隦	隧	隨	隩	險	隫	隬	隭	隮	隯
U+96Bx	隰	隱	隲	隳	隴	隵	隶	隷	隸	隹	隺	隻	隼	隽	难	隿
U+96Cx	雀	雁	雂	雃	雄	雅	集	雇	雈	雉	雊	雋	雌	雍	雎	雏
U+96Dx	雐	雑	雒	雓	雔	雕	雖	雗	雘	雙	雚	雛	雜	雝	雞	雟
U+96Ex	雠	雡	離	難	雤	雥	雦	雧	雨	雩	雪	雫	雬	雭	雮	雯
U+96Fx	雰	雱	雲	雳	雴	雵	零	雷	雸	雹	雺	電	雼	雽	雾	雿
U+970x	需	霁	霂	霃	霄	霅	霆	震	霈	霉	霊	霋	霌	霍	霎	霏
U+971x	霐	霑	霒	霓	霔	霕	霖	霗	霘	霙	霚	霛	霜	霝	霞	霟
U+972x	霠	霡	霢	霣	霤	霥	霦	霧	霨	霩	霪	霫	霬	霭	霮	霯
U+973x	霰	霱	露	霳	霴	霵	霶	霷	霸	霹	霺	霻	霼	霽	霾	霿
U+974x	靀	靁	靂	靃	靄	靅	靆	靇	靈	靉	靊	靋	靌	靍	靎	靏
U+975x	靐	靑	青	靓	靔	靕	靖	靗	靘	静	靚	靛	靜	靝	非	靟
U+976x	靠	靡	面	靣	靤	靥	靦	靧	靨	革	靪	靫	靬	靭	靮	靯
U+977x	靰	靱	靲	靳	靴	靵	靶	靷	靸	靹	靺	靻	靼	靽	靾	靿
U+978x	鞀	鞁	鞂	鞃	鞄	鞅	鞆	鞇	鞈	鞉	鞊	鞋	鞌	鞍	鞎	鞏
U+979x	鞐	鞑	鞒	鞓	鞔	鞕	鞖	鞗	鞘	鞙	鞚	鞛	鞜	鞝	鞞	鞟
U+97Ax	鞠	鞡	鞢	鞣	鞤	鞥	鞦	鞧	鞨	鞩	鞪	鞫	鞬	鞭	鞮	鞯
U+97Bx	鞰	鞱	鞲	鞳	鞴	鞵	鞶	鞷	鞸	鞹	鞺	鞻	鞼	鞽	鞾	鞿
U+97Cx	韀	韁	韂	韃	韄	韅	韆	韇	韈	韉	韊	韋	韌	韍	韎	韏
U+97Dx	韐	韑	韒	韓	韔	韕	韖	韗	韘	韙	韚	韛	韜	韝	韞	韟
U+97Ex	韠	韡	韢	韣	韤	韥	韦	韧	韨	韩	韪	韫	韬	韭	韮	韯
U+97Fx	韰	韱	韲	音	韴	韵	韶	韷	韸	韹	韺	韻	韼	韽	韾	響
U+980x	頀	頁	頂	頃	頄	項	順	頇	須	頉	頊	頋	頌	頍	頎	頏
U+981x	預	頑	頒	頓	頔	頕	頖	頗	領	頙	頚	頛	頜	頝	頞	頟
U+982x	頠	頡	頢	頣	頤	頥	頦	頧	頨	頩	頪	頫	頬	頭	頮	頯
U+983x	頰	頱	頲	頳	頴	頵	頶	頷	頸	頹	頺	頻	頼	頽	頾	頿
U+984x	顀	顁	顂	顃	顄	顅	顆	顇	顈	顉	顊	顋	題	額	顎	顏
U+985x	顐	顑	顒	顓	顔	顕	顖	顗	願	顙	顚	顛	顜	顝	類	顟
U+986x	顠	顡	顢	顣	顤	顥	顦	顧	顨	顩	顪	顫	顬	顭	顮	顯
U+987x	顰	顱	顲	顳	顴	页	顶	顷	顸	项	顺	须	顼	顽	顾	顿
U+988x	颀	颁	颂	颃	预	颅	领	颇	颈	颉	颊	颋	颌	颍	颎	颏
U+989x	颐	频	颒	颓	颔	颕	颖	颗	题	颙	颚	颛	颜	额	颞	颟
U+98Ax	颠	颡	颢	颣	颤	颥	颦	颧	風	颩	颪	颫	颬	颭	颮	颯
U+98Bx	颰	颱	颲	颳	颴	颵	颶	颷	颸	颹	颺	颻	颼	颽	颾	颿
U+98Cx	飀	飁	飂	飃	飄	飅	飆	飇	飈	飉	飊	飋	飌	飍	风	飏
U+98Dx	飐	飑	飒	飓	飔	飕	飖	飗	飘	飙	飚	飛	飜	飝	飞	食
U+98Ex	飠	飡	飢	飣	飤	飥	飦	飧	飨	飩	飪	飫	飬	飭	飮	飯
U+98Fx	飰	飱	飲	飳	飴	飵	飶	飷	飸	飹	飺	飻	飼	飽	飾	飿
U+990x	餀	餁	餂	餃	餄	餅	餆	餇	餈	餉	養	餋	餌	餍	餎	餏
U+991x	餐	餑	餒	餓	餔	餕	餖	餗	餘	餙	餚	餛	餜	餝	餞	餟
U+992x	餠	餡	餢	餣	餤	餥	餦	餧	館	餩	餪	餫	餬	餭	餮	餯
U+993x	餰	餱	餲	餳	餴	餵	餶	餷	餸	餹	餺	餻	餼	餽	餾	餿
U+994x	饀	饁	饂	饃	饄	饅	饆	饇	饈	饉	饊	饋	饌	饍	饎	饏
U+995x	饐	饑	饒	饓	饔	饕	饖	饗	饘	饙	饚	饛	饜	饝	饞	饟
U+996x	饠	饡	饢	饣	饤	饥	饦	饧	饨	饩	饪	饫	饬	饭	饮	饯
U+997x	饰	饱	饲	饳	饴	饵	饶	饷	饸	饹	饺	饻	饼	饽	饾	饿
U+998x	馀	馁	馂	馃	馄	馅	馆	馇	馈	馉	馊	馋	馌	馍	馎	馏
U+999x	馐	馑	馒	馓	馔	馕	首	馗	馘	香	馚	馛	馜	馝	馞	馟
U+99Ax	馠	馡	馢	馣	馤	馥	馦	馧	馨	馩	馪	馫	馬	馭	馮	馯
U+99Bx	馰	馱	馲	馳	馴	馵	馶	馷	馸	馹	馺	馻	馼	馽	馾	馿
U+99Cx	駀	駁	駂	駃	駄	駅	駆	駇	駈	駉	駊	駋	駌	駍	駎	駏
U+99Dx	駐	駑	駒	駓	駔	駕	駖	駗	駘	駙	駚	駛	駜	駝	駞	駟
U+99Ex	駠	駡	駢	駣	駤	駥	駦	駧	駨	駩	駪	駫	駬	駭	駮	駯
U+99Fx	駰	駱	駲	駳	駴	駵	駶	駷	駸	駹	駺	駻	駼	駽	駾	駿
U+9A0x	騀	騁	騂	騃	騄	騅	騆	騇	騈	騉	騊	騋	騌	騍	騎	騏
U+9A1x	騐	騑	騒	験	騔	騕	騖	騗	騘	騙	騚	騛	騜	騝	騞	騟
U+9A2x	騠	騡	騢	騣	騤	騥	騦	騧	騨	騩	騪	騫	騬	騭	騮	騯
U+9A3x	騰	騱	騲	騳	騴	騵	騶	騷	騸	騹	騺	騻	騼	騽	騾	騿
U+9A4x	驀	驁	驂	驃	驄	驅	驆	驇	驈	驉	驊	驋	驌	驍	驎	驏
U+9A5x	驐	驑	驒	驓	驔	驕	驖	驗	驘	驙	驚	驛	驜	驝	驞	驟
U+9A6x	驠	驡	驢	驣	驤	驥	驦	驧	驨	驩	驪	驫	马	驭	驮	驯
U+9A7x	驰	驱	驲	驳	驴	驵	驶	驷	驸	驹	驺	驻	驼	驽	驾	驿
U+9A8x	骀	骁	骂	骃	骄	骅	骆	骇	骈	骉	骊	骋	验	骍	骎	骏
U+9A9x	骐	骑	骒	骓	骔	骕	骖	骗	骘	骙	骚	骛	骜	骝	骞	骟
U+9AAx	骠	骡	骢	骣	骤	骥	骦	骧	骨	骩	骪	骫	骬	骭	骮	骯
U+9ABx	骰	骱	骲	骳	骴	骵	骶	骷	骸	骹	骺	骻	骼	骽	骾	骿
U+9ACx	髀	髁	髂	髃	髄	髅	髆	髇	髈	髉	髊	髋	髌	髍	髎	髏
U+9ADx	髐	髑	髒	髓	體	髕	髖	髗	高	髙	髚	髛	髜	髝	髞	髟
U+9AEx	髠	髡	髢	髣	髤	髥	髦	髧	髨	髩	髪	髫	髬	髭	髮	髯
U+9AFx	髰	髱	髲	髳	髴	髵	髶	髷	髸	髹	髺	髻	髼	髽	髾	髿
U+9B0x	鬀	鬁	鬂	鬃	鬄	鬅	鬆	鬇	鬈	鬉	鬊	鬋	鬌	鬍	鬎	鬏
U+9B1x	鬐	鬑	鬒	鬓	鬔	鬕	鬖	鬗	鬘	鬙	鬚	鬛	鬜	鬝	鬞	鬟
U+9B2x	鬠	鬡	鬢	鬣	鬤	鬥	鬦	鬧	鬨	鬩	鬪	鬫	鬬	鬭	鬮	鬯
U+9B3x	鬰	鬱	鬲	鬳	鬴	鬵	鬶	鬷	鬸	鬹	鬺	鬻	鬼	鬽	鬾	鬿
U+9B4x	魀	魁	魂	魃	魄	魅	魆	魇	魈	魉	魊	魋	魌	魍	魎	魏
U+9B5x	魐	魑	魒	魓	魔	魕	魖	魗	魘	魙	魚	魛	魜	魝	魞	魟
U+9B6x	魠	魡	魢	魣	魤	魥	魦	魧	魨	魩	魪	魫	魬	魭	魮	魯
U+9B7x	魰	魱	魲	魳	魴	魵	魶	魷	魸	魹	魺	魻	魼	魽	魾	魿
U+9B8x	鮀	鮁	鮂	鮃	鮄	鮅	鮆	鮇	鮈	鮉	鮊	鮋	鮌	鮍	鮎	鮏
U+9B9x	鮐	鮑	鮒	鮓	鮔	鮕	鮖	鮗	鮘	鮙	鮚	鮛	鮜	鮝	鮞	鮟
U+9BAx	鮠	鮡	鮢	鮣	鮤	鮥	鮦	鮧	鮨	鮩	鮪	鮫	鮬	鮭	鮮	鮯
U+9BBx	鮰	鮱	鮲	鮳	鮴	鮵	鮶	鮷	鮸	鮹	鮺	鮻	鮼	鮽	鮾	鮿
U+9BCx	鯀	鯁	鯂	鯃	鯄	鯅	鯆	鯇	鯈	鯉	鯊	鯋	鯌	鯍	鯎	鯏
U+9BDx	鯐	鯑	鯒	鯓	鯔	鯕	鯖	鯗	鯘	鯙	鯚	鯛	鯜	鯝	鯞	鯟
U+9BEx	鯠	鯡	鯢	鯣	鯤	鯥	鯦	鯧	鯨	鯩	鯪	鯫	鯬	鯭	鯮	鯯
U+9BFx	鯰	鯱	鯲	鯳	鯴	鯵	鯶	鯷	鯸	鯹	鯺	鯻	鯼	鯽	鯾	鯿
U+9C0x	鰀	鰁	鰂	鰃	鰄	鰅	鰆	鰇	鰈	鰉	鰊	鰋	鰌	鰍	鰎	鰏
U+9C1x	鰐	鰑	鰒	鰓	鰔	鰕	鰖	鰗	鰘	鰙	鰚	鰛	鰜	鰝	鰞	鰟
U+9C2x	鰠	鰡	鰢	鰣	鰤	鰥	鰦	鰧	鰨	鰩	鰪	鰫	鰬	鰭	鰮	鰯
U+9C3x	鰰	鰱	鰲	鰳	鰴	鰵	鰶	鰷	鰸	鰹	鰺	鰻	鰼	鰽	鰾	鰿
U+9C4x	鱀	鱁	鱂	鱃	鱄	鱅	鱆	鱇	鱈	鱉	鱊	鱋	鱌	鱍	鱎	鱏
U+9C5x	鱐	鱑	鱒	鱓	鱔	鱕	鱖	鱗	鱘	鱙	鱚	鱛	鱜	鱝	鱞	鱟
U+9C6x	鱠	鱡	鱢	鱣	鱤	鱥	鱦	鱧	鱨	鱩	鱪	鱫	鱬	鱭	鱮	鱯
U+9C7x	鱰	鱱	鱲	鱳	鱴	鱵	鱶	鱷	鱸	鱹	鱺	鱻	鱼	鱽	鱾	鱿
U+9C8x	鲀	鲁	鲂	鲃	鲄	鲅	鲆	鲇	鲈	鲉	鲊	鲋	鲌	鲍	鲎	鲏
U+9C9x	鲐	鲑	鲒	鲓	鲔	鲕	鲖	鲗	鲘	鲙	鲚	鲛	鲜	鲝	鲞	鲟
U+9CAx	鲠	鲡	鲢	鲣	鲤	鲥	鲦	鲧	鲨	鲩	鲪	鲫	鲬	鲭	鲮	鲯
U+9CBx	鲰	鲱	鲲	鲳	鲴	鲵	鲶	鲷	鲸	鲹	鲺	鲻	鲼	鲽	鲾	鲿
U+9CCx	鳀	鳁	鳂	鳃	鳄	鳅	鳆	鳇	鳈	鳉	鳊	鳋	鳌	鳍	鳎	鳏
U+9CDx	鳐	鳑	鳒	鳓	鳔	鳕	鳖	鳗	鳘	鳙	鳚	鳛	鳜	鳝	鳞	鳟
U+9CEx	鳠	鳡	鳢	鳣	鳤	鳥	鳦	鳧	鳨	鳩	鳪	鳫	鳬	鳭	鳮	鳯
U+9CFx	鳰	鳱	鳲	鳳	鳴	鳵	鳶	鳷	鳸	鳹	鳺	鳻	鳼	鳽	鳾	鳿
U+9D0x	鴀	鴁	鴂	鴃	鴄	鴅	鴆	鴇	鴈	鴉	鴊	鴋	鴌	鴍	鴎	鴏
U+9D1x	鴐	鴑	鴒	鴓	鴔	鴕	鴖	鴗	鴘	鴙	鴚	鴛	鴜	鴝	鴞	鴟
U+9D2x	鴠	鴡	鴢	鴣	鴤	鴥	鴦	鴧	鴨	鴩	鴪	鴫	鴬	鴭	鴮	鴯
U+9D3x	鴰	鴱	鴲	鴳	鴴	鴵	鴶	鴷	鴸	鴹	鴺	鴻	鴼	鴽	鴾	鴿
U+9D4x	鵀	鵁	鵂	鵃	鵄	鵅	鵆	鵇	鵈	鵉	鵊	鵋	鵌	鵍	鵎	鵏
U+9D5x	鵐	鵑	鵒	鵓	鵔	鵕	鵖	鵗	鵘	鵙	鵚	鵛	鵜	鵝	鵞	鵟
U+9D6x	鵠	鵡	鵢	鵣	鵤	鵥	鵦	鵧	鵨	鵩	鵪	鵫	鵬	鵭	鵮	鵯
U+9D7x	鵰	鵱	鵲	鵳	鵴	鵵	鵶	鵷	鵸	鵹	鵺	鵻	鵼	鵽	鵾	鵿
U+9D8x	鶀	鶁	鶂	鶃	鶄	鶅	鶆	鶇	鶈	鶉	鶊	鶋	鶌	鶍	鶎	鶏
U+9D9x	鶐	鶑	鶒	鶓	鶔	鶕	鶖	鶗	鶘	鶙	鶚	鶛	鶜	鶝	鶞	鶟
U+9DAx	鶠	鶡	鶢	鶣	鶤	鶥	鶦	鶧	鶨	鶩	鶪	鶫	鶬	鶭	鶮	鶯
U+9DBx	鶰	鶱	鶲	鶳	鶴	鶵	鶶	鶷	鶸	鶹	鶺	鶻	鶼	鶽	鶾	鶿
U+9DCx	鷀	鷁	鷂	鷃	鷄	鷅	鷆	鷇	鷈	鷉	鷊	鷋	鷌	鷍	鷎	鷏
U+9DDx	鷐	鷑	鷒	鷓	鷔	鷕	鷖	鷗	鷘	鷙	鷚	鷛	鷜	鷝	鷞	鷟
U+9DEx	鷠	鷡	鷢	鷣	鷤	鷥	鷦	鷧	鷨	鷩	鷪	鷫	鷬	鷭	鷮	鷯
U+9DFx	鷰	鷱	鷲	鷳	鷴	鷵	鷶	鷷	鷸	鷹	鷺	鷻	鷼	鷽	鷾	鷿
U+9E0x	鸀	鸁	鸂	鸃	鸄	鸅	鸆	鸇	鸈	鸉	鸊	鸋	鸌	鸍	鸎	鸏
U+9E1x	鸐	鸑	鸒	鸓	鸔	鸕	鸖	鸗	鸘	鸙	鸚	鸛	鸜	鸝	鸞	鸟
U+9E2x	鸠	鸡	鸢	鸣	鸤	鸥	鸦	鸧	鸨	鸩	鸪	鸫	鸬	鸭	鸮	鸯
U+9E3x	鸰	鸱	鸲	鸳	鸴	鸵	鸶	鸷	鸸	鸹	鸺	鸻	鸼	鸽	鸾	鸿
U+9E4x	鹀	鹁	鹂	鹃	鹄	鹅	鹆	鹇	鹈	鹉	鹊	鹋	鹌	鹍	鹎	鹏
U+9E5x	鹐	鹑	鹒	鹓	鹔	鹕	鹖	鹗	鹘	鹙	鹚	鹛	鹜	鹝	鹞	鹟
U+9E6x	鹠	鹡	鹢	鹣	鹤	鹥	鹦	鹧	鹨	鹩	鹪	鹫	鹬	鹭	鹮	鹯
U+9E7x	鹰	鹱	鹲	鹳	鹴	鹵	鹶	鹷	鹸	鹹	鹺	鹻	鹼	鹽	鹾	鹿
U+9E8x	麀	麁	麂	麃	麄	麅	麆	麇	麈	麉	麊	麋	麌	麍	麎	麏
U+9E9x	麐	麑	麒	麓	麔	麕	麖	麗	麘	麙	麚	麛	麜	麝	麞	麟
U+9EAx	麠	麡	麢	麣	麤	麥	麦	麧	麨	麩	麪	麫	麬	麭	麮	麯
U+9EBx	麰	麱	麲	麳	麴	麵	麶	麷	麸	麹	麺	麻	麼	麽	麾	麿
U+9ECx	黀	黁	黂	黃	黄	黅	黆	黇	黈	黉	黊	黋	黌	黍	黎	黏
U+9EDx	黐	黑	黒	黓	黔	黕	黖	黗	默	黙	黚	黛	黜	黝	點	黟
U+9EEx	黠	黡	黢	黣	黤	黥	黦	黧	黨	黩	黪	黫	黬	黭	黮	黯
U+9EFx	黰	黱	黲	黳	黴	黵	黶	黷	黸	黹	黺	黻	黼	黽	黾	黿
U+9F0x	鼀	鼁	鼂	鼃	鼄	鼅	鼆	鼇	鼈	鼉	鼊	鼋	鼌	鼍	鼎	鼏
U+9F1x	鼐	鼑	鼒	鼓	鼔	鼕	鼖	鼗	鼘	鼙	鼚	鼛	鼜	鼝	鼞	鼟
U+9F2x	鼠	鼡	鼢	鼣	鼤	鼥	鼦	鼧	鼨	鼩	鼪	鼫	鼬	鼭	鼮	鼯
U+9F3x	鼰	鼱	鼲	鼳	鼴	鼵	鼶	鼷	鼸	鼹	鼺	鼻	鼼	鼽	鼾	鼿
U+9F4x	齀	齁	齂	齃	齄	齅	齆	齇	齈	齉	齊	齋	齌	齍	齎	齏
U+9F5x	齐	齑	齒	齓	齔	齕	齖	齗	齘	齙	齚	齛	齜	齝	齞	齟
U+9F6x	齠	齡	齢	齣	齤	齥	齦	齧	齨	齩	齪	齫	齬	齭	齮	齯
U+9F7x	齰	齱	齲	齳	齴	齵	齶	齷	齸	齹	齺	齻	齼	齽	齾	齿
U+9F8x	龀	龁	龂	龃	龄	龅	龆	龇	龈	龉	龊	龋	龌	龍	龎	龏
U+9F9x	龐	龑	龒	龓	龔	龕	龖	龗	龘	龙	龚	龛	龜	龝	龞	龟
U+9FAx	龠	龡	龢	龣	龤	龥	龦	龧	龨	龩	龪	龫	龬	龭	龮	龯
U+9FBx	龰	龱	龲	龳	龴	龵	龶	龷	龸	龹	龺	龻	龼	龽	龾	龿
U+9FCx	鿀	鿁	鿂	鿃	鿄	鿅	鿆	鿇	鿈	鿉	鿊	鿋	鿌	鿍	鿎	鿏
U+9FDx	鿐	鿑	鿒	鿓	鿔	鿕	鿖	鿗	鿘	鿙	鿚	鿛	鿜	鿝	鿞	鿟
U+9FEx	鿠	鿡	鿢	鿣	鿤	鿥	鿦	鿧	鿨	鿩	鿪	鿫	鿬	鿭	鿮	鿯
U+9FFx	鿰	鿱	鿲	鿳	鿴	鿵	鿶	鿷	鿸	鿹	鿺	鿻	鿼	鿽	鿾	鿿
Notes 1.As of Unicode version 18.0
