= List of CJK Unified Ideographs, part 3 of 4 =

CJK Unified Ideographs (Part 3 of 4)^{[1]} Official Unicode Consortium code chart (PDF)
	0	1	2	3	4	5	6	7	8	9	A	B	C	D	E	F
U+780x	砀	码	砂	砃	砄	砅	砆	砇	砈	砉	砊	砋	砌	砍	砎	砏
U+781x	砐	砑	砒	砓	研	砕	砖	砗	砘	砙	砚	砛	砜	砝	砞	砟
U+782x	砠	砡	砢	砣	砤	砥	砦	砧	砨	砩	砪	砫	砬	砭	砮	砯
U+783x	砰	砱	砲	砳	破	砵	砶	砷	砸	砹	砺	砻	砼	砽	砾	砿
U+784x	础	硁	硂	硃	硄	硅	硆	硇	硈	硉	硊	硋	硌	硍	硎	硏
U+785x	硐	硑	硒	硓	硔	硕	硖	硗	硘	硙	硚	硛	硜	硝	硞	硟
U+786x	硠	硡	硢	硣	硤	硥	硦	硧	硨	硩	硪	硫	硬	硭	确	硯
U+787x	硰	硱	硲	硳	硴	硵	硶	硷	硸	硹	硺	硻	硼	硽	硾	硿
U+788x	碀	碁	碂	碃	碄	碅	碆	碇	碈	碉	碊	碋	碌	碍	碎	碏
U+789x	碐	碑	碒	碓	碔	碕	碖	碗	碘	碙	碚	碛	碜	碝	碞	碟
U+78Ax	碠	碡	碢	碣	碤	碥	碦	碧	碨	碩	碪	碫	碬	碭	碮	碯
U+78Bx	碰	碱	碲	碳	碴	碵	碶	碷	碸	碹	確	碻	碼	碽	碾	碿
U+78Cx	磀	磁	磂	磃	磄	磅	磆	磇	磈	磉	磊	磋	磌	磍	磎	磏
U+78Dx	磐	磑	磒	磓	磔	磕	磖	磗	磘	磙	磚	磛	磜	磝	磞	磟
U+78Ex	磠	磡	磢	磣	磤	磥	磦	磧	磨	磩	磪	磫	磬	磭	磮	磯
U+78Fx	磰	磱	磲	磳	磴	磵	磶	磷	磸	磹	磺	磻	磼	磽	磾	磿
U+790x	礀	礁	礂	礃	礄	礅	礆	礇	礈	礉	礊	礋	礌	礍	礎	礏
U+791x	礐	礑	礒	礓	礔	礕	礖	礗	礘	礙	礚	礛	礜	礝	礞	礟
U+792x	礠	礡	礢	礣	礤	礥	礦	礧	礨	礩	礪	礫	礬	礭	礮	礯
U+793x	礰	礱	礲	礳	礴	礵	礶	礷	礸	礹	示	礻	礼	礽	社	礿
U+794x	祀	祁	祂	祃	祄	祅	祆	祇	祈	祉	祊	祋	祌	祍	祎	祏
U+795x	祐	祑	祒	祓	祔	祕	祖	祗	祘	祙	祚	祛	祜	祝	神	祟
U+796x	祠	祡	祢	祣	祤	祥	祦	祧	票	祩	祪	祫	祬	祭	祮	祯
U+797x	祰	祱	祲	祳	祴	祵	祶	祷	祸	祹	祺	祻	祼	祽	祾	祿
U+798x	禀	禁	禂	禃	禄	禅	禆	禇	禈	禉	禊	禋	禌	禍	禎	福
U+799x	禐	禑	禒	禓	禔	禕	禖	禗	禘	禙	禚	禛	禜	禝	禞	禟
U+79Ax	禠	禡	禢	禣	禤	禥	禦	禧	禨	禩	禪	禫	禬	禭	禮	禯
U+79Bx	禰	禱	禲	禳	禴	禵	禶	禷	禸	禹	禺	离	禼	禽	禾	禿
U+79Cx	秀	私	秂	秃	秄	秅	秆	秇	秈	秉	秊	秋	秌	种	秎	秏
U+79Dx	秐	科	秒	秓	秔	秕	秖	秗	秘	秙	秚	秛	秜	秝	秞	租
U+79Ex	秠	秡	秢	秣	秤	秥	秦	秧	秨	秩	秪	秫	秬	秭	秮	积
U+79Fx	称	秱	秲	秳	秴	秵	秶	秷	秸	秹	秺	移	秼	秽	秾	秿
U+7A0x	稀	稁	稂	稃	稄	稅	稆	稇	稈	稉	稊	程	稌	稍	税	稏
U+7A1x	稐	稑	稒	稓	稔	稕	稖	稗	稘	稙	稚	稛	稜	稝	稞	稟
U+7A2x	稠	稡	稢	稣	稤	稥	稦	稧	稨	稩	稪	稫	稬	稭	種	稯
U+7A3x	稰	稱	稲	稳	稴	稵	稶	稷	稸	稹	稺	稻	稼	稽	稾	稿
U+7A4x	穀	穁	穂	穃	穄	穅	穆	穇	穈	穉	穊	穋	穌	積	穎	穏
U+7A5x	穐	穑	穒	穓	穔	穕	穖	穗	穘	穙	穚	穛	穜	穝	穞	穟
U+7A6x	穠	穡	穢	穣	穤	穥	穦	穧	穨	穩	穪	穫	穬	穭	穮	穯
U+7A7x	穰	穱	穲	穳	穴	穵	究	穷	穸	穹	空	穻	穼	穽	穾	穿
U+7A8x	窀	突	窂	窃	窄	窅	窆	窇	窈	窉	窊	窋	窌	窍	窎	窏
U+7A9x	窐	窑	窒	窓	窔	窕	窖	窗	窘	窙	窚	窛	窜	窝	窞	窟
U+7AAx	窠	窡	窢	窣	窤	窥	窦	窧	窨	窩	窪	窫	窬	窭	窮	窯
U+7ABx	窰	窱	窲	窳	窴	窵	窶	窷	窸	窹	窺	窻	窼	窽	窾	窿
U+7ACx	竀	竁	竂	竃	竄	竅	竆	竇	竈	竉	竊	立	竌	竍	竎	竏
U+7ADx	竐	竑	竒	竓	竔	竕	竖	竗	竘	站	竚	竛	竜	竝	竞	竟
U+7AEx	章	竡	竢	竣	竤	童	竦	竧	竨	竩	竪	竫	竬	竭	竮	端
U+7AFx	竰	竱	竲	竳	竴	竵	競	竷	竸	竹	竺	竻	竼	竽	竾	竿
U+7B0x	笀	笁	笂	笃	笄	笅	笆	笇	笈	笉	笊	笋	笌	笍	笎	笏
U+7B1x	笐	笑	笒	笓	笔	笕	笖	笗	笘	笙	笚	笛	笜	笝	笞	笟
U+7B2x	笠	笡	笢	笣	笤	笥	符	笧	笨	笩	笪	笫	第	笭	笮	笯
U+7B3x	笰	笱	笲	笳	笴	笵	笶	笷	笸	笹	笺	笻	笼	笽	笾	笿
U+7B4x	筀	筁	筂	筃	筄	筅	筆	筇	筈	等	筊	筋	筌	筍	筎	筏
U+7B5x	筐	筑	筒	筓	答	筕	策	筗	筘	筙	筚	筛	筜	筝	筞	筟
U+7B6x	筠	筡	筢	筣	筤	筥	筦	筧	筨	筩	筪	筫	筬	筭	筮	筯
U+7B7x	筰	筱	筲	筳	筴	筵	筶	筷	筸	筹	筺	筻	筼	筽	签	筿
U+7B8x	简	箁	箂	箃	箄	箅	箆	箇	箈	箉	箊	箋	箌	箍	箎	箏
U+7B9x	箐	箑	箒	箓	箔	箕	箖	算	箘	箙	箚	箛	箜	箝	箞	箟
U+7BAx	箠	管	箢	箣	箤	箥	箦	箧	箨	箩	箪	箫	箬	箭	箮	箯
U+7BBx	箰	箱	箲	箳	箴	箵	箶	箷	箸	箹	箺	箻	箼	箽	箾	箿
U+7BCx	節	篁	篂	篃	範	篅	篆	篇	篈	築	篊	篋	篌	篍	篎	篏
U+7BDx	篐	篑	篒	篓	篔	篕	篖	篗	篘	篙	篚	篛	篜	篝	篞	篟
U+7BEx	篠	篡	篢	篣	篤	篥	篦	篧	篨	篩	篪	篫	篬	篭	篮	篯
U+7BFx	篰	篱	篲	篳	篴	篵	篶	篷	篸	篹	篺	篻	篼	篽	篾	篿
U+7C0x	簀	簁	簂	簃	簄	簅	簆	簇	簈	簉	簊	簋	簌	簍	簎	簏
U+7C1x	簐	簑	簒	簓	簔	簕	簖	簗	簘	簙	簚	簛	簜	簝	簞	簟
U+7C2x	簠	簡	簢	簣	簤	簥	簦	簧	簨	簩	簪	簫	簬	簭	簮	簯
U+7C3x	簰	簱	簲	簳	簴	簵	簶	簷	簸	簹	簺	簻	簼	簽	簾	簿
U+7C4x	籀	籁	籂	籃	籄	籅	籆	籇	籈	籉	籊	籋	籌	籍	籎	籏
U+7C5x	籐	籑	籒	籓	籔	籕	籖	籗	籘	籙	籚	籛	籜	籝	籞	籟
U+7C6x	籠	籡	籢	籣	籤	籥	籦	籧	籨	籩	籪	籫	籬	籭	籮	籯
U+7C7x	籰	籱	籲	米	籴	籵	籶	籷	籸	籹	籺	类	籼	籽	籾	籿
U+7C8x	粀	粁	粂	粃	粄	粅	粆	粇	粈	粉	粊	粋	粌	粍	粎	粏
U+7C9x	粐	粑	粒	粓	粔	粕	粖	粗	粘	粙	粚	粛	粜	粝	粞	粟
U+7CAx	粠	粡	粢	粣	粤	粥	粦	粧	粨	粩	粪	粫	粬	粭	粮	粯
U+7CBx	粰	粱	粲	粳	粴	粵	粶	粷	粸	粹	粺	粻	粼	粽	精	粿
U+7CCx	糀	糁	糂	糃	糄	糅	糆	糇	糈	糉	糊	糋	糌	糍	糎	糏
U+7CDx	糐	糑	糒	糓	糔	糕	糖	糗	糘	糙	糚	糛	糜	糝	糞	糟
U+7CEx	糠	糡	糢	糣	糤	糥	糦	糧	糨	糩	糪	糫	糬	糭	糮	糯
U+7CFx	糰	糱	糲	糳	糴	糵	糶	糷	糸	糹	糺	系	糼	糽	糾	糿
U+7D0x	紀	紁	紂	紃	約	紅	紆	紇	紈	紉	紊	紋	紌	納	紎	紏
U+7D1x	紐	紑	紒	紓	純	紕	紖	紗	紘	紙	級	紛	紜	紝	紞	紟
U+7D2x	素	紡	索	紣	紤	紥	紦	紧	紨	紩	紪	紫	紬	紭	紮	累
U+7D3x	細	紱	紲	紳	紴	紵	紶	紷	紸	紹	紺	紻	紼	紽	紾	紿
U+7D4x	絀	絁	終	絃	組	絅	絆	絇	絈	絉	絊	絋	経	絍	絎	絏
U+7D5x	結	絑	絒	絓	絔	絕	絖	絗	絘	絙	絚	絛	絜	絝	絞	絟
U+7D6x	絠	絡	絢	絣	絤	絥	給	絧	絨	絩	絪	絫	絬	絭	絮	絯
U+7D7x	絰	統	絲	絳	絴	絵	絶	絷	絸	絹	絺	絻	絼	絽	絾	絿
U+7D8x	綀	綁	綂	綃	綄	綅	綆	綇	綈	綉	綊	綋	綌	綍	綎	綏
U+7D9x	綐	綑	綒	經	綔	綕	綖	綗	綘	継	続	綛	綜	綝	綞	綟
U+7DAx	綠	綡	綢	綣	綤	綥	綦	綧	綨	綩	綪	綫	綬	維	綮	綯
U+7DBx	綰	綱	網	綳	綴	綵	綶	綷	綸	綹	綺	綻	綼	綽	綾	綿
U+7DCx	緀	緁	緂	緃	緄	緅	緆	緇	緈	緉	緊	緋	緌	緍	緎	総
U+7DDx	緐	緑	緒	緓	緔	緕	緖	緗	緘	緙	線	緛	緜	緝	緞	緟
U+7DEx	締	緡	緢	緣	緤	緥	緦	緧	編	緩	緪	緫	緬	緭	緮	緯
U+7DFx	緰	緱	緲	緳	練	緵	緶	緷	緸	緹	緺	緻	緼	緽	緾	緿
U+7E0x	縀	縁	縂	縃	縄	縅	縆	縇	縈	縉	縊	縋	縌	縍	縎	縏
U+7E1x	縐	縑	縒	縓	縔	縕	縖	縗	縘	縙	縚	縛	縜	縝	縞	縟
U+7E2x	縠	縡	縢	縣	縤	縥	縦	縧	縨	縩	縪	縫	縬	縭	縮	縯
U+7E3x	縰	縱	縲	縳	縴	縵	縶	縷	縸	縹	縺	縻	縼	總	績	縿
U+7E4x	繀	繁	繂	繃	繄	繅	繆	繇	繈	繉	繊	繋	繌	繍	繎	繏
U+7E5x	繐	繑	繒	繓	織	繕	繖	繗	繘	繙	繚	繛	繜	繝	繞	繟
U+7E6x	繠	繡	繢	繣	繤	繥	繦	繧	繨	繩	繪	繫	繬	繭	繮	繯
U+7E7x	繰	繱	繲	繳	繴	繵	繶	繷	繸	繹	繺	繻	繼	繽	繾	繿
U+7E8x	纀	纁	纂	纃	纄	纅	纆	纇	纈	纉	纊	纋	續	纍	纎	纏
U+7E9x	纐	纑	纒	纓	纔	纕	纖	纗	纘	纙	纚	纛	纜	纝	纞	纟
U+7EAx	纠	纡	红	纣	纤	纥	约	级	纨	纩	纪	纫	纬	纭	纮	纯
U+7EBx	纰	纱	纲	纳	纴	纵	纶	纷	纸	纹	纺	纻	纼	纽	纾	线
U+7ECx	绀	绁	绂	练	组	绅	细	织	终	绉	绊	绋	绌	绍	绎	经
U+7EDx	绐	绑	绒	结	绔	绕	绖	绗	绘	给	绚	绛	络	绝	绞	统
U+7EEx	绠	绡	绢	绣	绤	绥	绦	继	绨	绩	绪	绫	绬	续	绮	绯
U+7EFx	绰	绱	绲	绳	维	绵	绶	绷	绸	绹	绺	绻	综	绽	绾	绿
U+7F0x	缀	缁	缂	缃	缄	缅	缆	缇	缈	缉	缊	缋	缌	缍	缎	缏
U+7F1x	缐	缑	缒	缓	缔	缕	编	缗	缘	缙	缚	缛	缜	缝	缞	缟
U+7F2x	缠	缡	缢	缣	缤	缥	缦	缧	缨	缩	缪	缫	缬	缭	缮	缯
U+7F3x	缰	缱	缲	缳	缴	缵	缶	缷	缸	缹	缺	缻	缼	缽	缾	缿
U+7F4x	罀	罁	罂	罃	罄	罅	罆	罇	罈	罉	罊	罋	罌	罍	罎	罏
U+7F5x	罐	网	罒	罓	罔	罕	罖	罗	罘	罙	罚	罛	罜	罝	罞	罟
U+7F6x	罠	罡	罢	罣	罤	罥	罦	罧	罨	罩	罪	罫	罬	罭	置	罯
U+7F7x	罰	罱	署	罳	罴	罵	罶	罷	罸	罹	罺	罻	罼	罽	罾	罿
U+7F8x	羀	羁	羂	羃	羄	羅	羆	羇	羈	羉	羊	羋	羌	羍	美	羏
U+7F9x	羐	羑	羒	羓	羔	羕	羖	羗	羘	羙	羚	羛	羜	羝	羞	羟
U+7FAx	羠	羡	羢	羣	群	羥	羦	羧	羨	義	羪	羫	羬	羭	羮	羯
U+7FBx	羰	羱	羲	羳	羴	羵	羶	羷	羸	羹	羺	羻	羼	羽	羾	羿
U+7FCx	翀	翁	翂	翃	翄	翅	翆	翇	翈	翉	翊	翋	翌	翍	翎	翏
U+7FDx	翐	翑	習	翓	翔	翕	翖	翗	翘	翙	翚	翛	翜	翝	翞	翟
U+7FEx	翠	翡	翢	翣	翤	翥	翦	翧	翨	翩	翪	翫	翬	翭	翮	翯
U+7FFx	翰	翱	翲	翳	翴	翵	翶	翷	翸	翹	翺	翻	翼	翽	翾	翿
U+800x	耀	老	耂	考	耄	者	耆	耇	耈	耉	耊	耋	而	耍	耎	耏
U+801x	耐	耑	耒	耓	耔	耕	耖	耗	耘	耙	耚	耛	耜	耝	耞	耟
U+802x	耠	耡	耢	耣	耤	耥	耦	耧	耨	耩	耪	耫	耬	耭	耮	耯
U+803x	耰	耱	耲	耳	耴	耵	耶	耷	耸	耹	耺	耻	耼	耽	耾	耿
U+804x	聀	聁	聂	聃	聄	聅	聆	聇	聈	聉	聊	聋	职	聍	聎	聏
U+805x	聐	聑	聒	聓	联	聕	聖	聗	聘	聙	聚	聛	聜	聝	聞	聟
U+806x	聠	聡	聢	聣	聤	聥	聦	聧	聨	聩	聪	聫	聬	聭	聮	聯
U+807x	聰	聱	聲	聳	聴	聵	聶	職	聸	聹	聺	聻	聼	聽	聾	聿
U+808x	肀	肁	肂	肃	肄	肅	肆	肇	肈	肉	肊	肋	肌	肍	肎	肏
U+809x	肐	肑	肒	肓	肔	肕	肖	肗	肘	肙	肚	肛	肜	肝	肞	肟
U+80Ax	肠	股	肢	肣	肤	肥	肦	肧	肨	肩	肪	肫	肬	肭	肮	肯
U+80Bx	肰	肱	育	肳	肴	肵	肶	肷	肸	肹	肺	肻	肼	肽	肾	肿
U+80Cx	胀	胁	胂	胃	胄	胅	胆	胇	胈	胉	胊	胋	背	胍	胎	胏
U+80Dx	胐	胑	胒	胓	胔	胕	胖	胗	胘	胙	胚	胛	胜	胝	胞	胟
U+80Ex	胠	胡	胢	胣	胤	胥	胦	胧	胨	胩	胪	胫	胬	胭	胮	胯
U+80Fx	胰	胱	胲	胳	胴	胵	胶	胷	胸	胹	胺	胻	胼	能	胾	胿
U+810x	脀	脁	脂	脃	脄	脅	脆	脇	脈	脉	脊	脋	脌	脍	脎	脏
U+811x	脐	脑	脒	脓	脔	脕	脖	脗	脘	脙	脚	脛	脜	脝	脞	脟
U+812x	脠	脡	脢	脣	脤	脥	脦	脧	脨	脩	脪	脫	脬	脭	脮	脯
U+813x	脰	脱	脲	脳	脴	脵	脶	脷	脸	脹	脺	脻	脼	脽	脾	脿
U+814x	腀	腁	腂	腃	腄	腅	腆	腇	腈	腉	腊	腋	腌	腍	腎	腏
U+815x	腐	腑	腒	腓	腔	腕	腖	腗	腘	腙	腚	腛	腜	腝	腞	腟
U+816x	腠	腡	腢	腣	腤	腥	腦	腧	腨	腩	腪	腫	腬	腭	腮	腯
U+817x	腰	腱	腲	腳	腴	腵	腶	腷	腸	腹	腺	腻	腼	腽	腾	腿
U+818x	膀	膁	膂	膃	膄	膅	膆	膇	膈	膉	膊	膋	膌	膍	膎	膏
U+819x	膐	膑	膒	膓	膔	膕	膖	膗	膘	膙	膚	膛	膜	膝	膞	膟
U+81Ax	膠	膡	膢	膣	膤	膥	膦	膧	膨	膩	膪	膫	膬	膭	膮	膯
U+81Bx	膰	膱	膲	膳	膴	膵	膶	膷	膸	膹	膺	膻	膼	膽	膾	膿
U+81Cx	臀	臁	臂	臃	臄	臅	臆	臇	臈	臉	臊	臋	臌	臍	臎	臏
U+81Dx	臐	臑	臒	臓	臔	臕	臖	臗	臘	臙	臚	臛	臜	臝	臞	臟
U+81Ex	臠	臡	臢	臣	臤	臥	臦	臧	臨	臩	自	臫	臬	臭	臮	臯
U+81Fx	臰	臱	臲	至	致	臵	臶	臷	臸	臹	臺	臻	臼	臽	臾	臿
U+820x	舀	舁	舂	舃	舄	舅	舆	與	興	舉	舊	舋	舌	舍	舎	舏
U+821x	舐	舑	舒	舓	舔	舕	舖	舗	舘	舙	舚	舛	舜	舝	舞	舟
U+822x	舠	舡	舢	舣	舤	舥	舦	舧	舨	舩	航	舫	般	舭	舮	舯
U+823x	舰	舱	舲	舳	舴	舵	舶	舷	舸	船	舺	舻	舼	舽	舾	舿
U+824x	艀	艁	艂	艃	艄	艅	艆	艇	艈	艉	艊	艋	艌	艍	艎	艏
U+825x	艐	艑	艒	艓	艔	艕	艖	艗	艘	艙	艚	艛	艜	艝	艞	艟
U+826x	艠	艡	艢	艣	艤	艥	艦	艧	艨	艩	艪	艫	艬	艭	艮	良
U+827x	艰	艱	色	艳	艴	艵	艶	艷	艸	艹	艺	艻	艼	艽	艾	艿
U+828x	芀	芁	节	芃	芄	芅	芆	芇	芈	芉	芊	芋	芌	芍	芎	芏
U+829x	芐	芑	芒	芓	芔	芕	芖	芗	芘	芙	芚	芛	芜	芝	芞	芟
U+82Ax	芠	芡	芢	芣	芤	芥	芦	芧	芨	芩	芪	芫	芬	芭	芮	芯
U+82Bx	芰	花	芲	芳	芴	芵	芶	芷	芸	芹	芺	芻	芼	芽	芾	芿
U+82Cx	苀	苁	苂	苃	苄	苅	苆	苇	苈	苉	苊	苋	苌	苍	苎	苏
U+82Dx	苐	苑	苒	苓	苔	苕	苖	苗	苘	苙	苚	苛	苜	苝	苞	苟
U+82Ex	苠	苡	苢	苣	苤	若	苦	苧	苨	苩	苪	苫	苬	苭	苮	苯
U+82Fx	苰	英	苲	苳	苴	苵	苶	苷	苸	苹	苺	苻	苼	苽	苾	苿
U+830x	茀	茁	茂	范	茄	茅	茆	茇	茈	茉	茊	茋	茌	茍	茎	茏
U+831x	茐	茑	茒	茓	茔	茕	茖	茗	茘	茙	茚	茛	茜	茝	茞	茟
U+832x	茠	茡	茢	茣	茤	茥	茦	茧	茨	茩	茪	茫	茬	茭	茮	茯
U+833x	茰	茱	茲	茳	茴	茵	茶	茷	茸	茹	茺	茻	茼	茽	茾	茿
U+834x	荀	荁	荂	荃	荄	荅	荆	荇	荈	草	荊	荋	荌	荍	荎	荏
U+835x	荐	荑	荒	荓	荔	荕	荖	荗	荘	荙	荚	荛	荜	荝	荞	荟
U+836x	荠	荡	荢	荣	荤	荥	荦	荧	荨	荩	荪	荫	荬	荭	荮	药
U+837x	荰	荱	荲	荳	荴	荵	荶	荷	荸	荹	荺	荻	荼	荽	荾	荿
U+838x	莀	莁	莂	莃	莄	莅	莆	莇	莈	莉	莊	莋	莌	莍	莎	莏
U+839x	莐	莑	莒	莓	莔	莕	莖	莗	莘	莙	莚	莛	莜	莝	莞	莟
U+83Ax	莠	莡	莢	莣	莤	莥	莦	莧	莨	莩	莪	莫	莬	莭	莮	莯
U+83Bx	莰	莱	莲	莳	莴	莵	莶	获	莸	莹	莺	莻	莼	莽	莾	莿
U+83Cx	菀	菁	菂	菃	菄	菅	菆	菇	菈	菉	菊	菋	菌	菍	菎	菏
U+83Dx	菐	菑	菒	菓	菔	菕	菖	菗	菘	菙	菚	菛	菜	菝	菞	菟
U+83Ex	菠	菡	菢	菣	菤	菥	菦	菧	菨	菩	菪	菫	菬	菭	菮	華
U+83Fx	菰	菱	菲	菳	菴	菵	菶	菷	菸	菹	菺	菻	菼	菽	菾	菿
U+840x	萀	萁	萂	萃	萄	萅	萆	萇	萈	萉	萊	萋	萌	萍	萎	萏
U+841x	萐	萑	萒	萓	萔	萕	萖	萗	萘	萙	萚	萛	萜	萝	萞	萟
U+842x	萠	萡	萢	萣	萤	营	萦	萧	萨	萩	萪	萫	萬	萭	萮	萯
U+843x	萰	萱	萲	萳	萴	萵	萶	萷	萸	萹	萺	萻	萼	落	萾	萿
U+844x	葀	葁	葂	葃	葄	葅	葆	葇	葈	葉	葊	葋	葌	葍	葎	葏
U+845x	葐	葑	葒	葓	葔	葕	葖	著	葘	葙	葚	葛	葜	葝	葞	葟
U+846x	葠	葡	葢	董	葤	葥	葦	葧	葨	葩	葪	葫	葬	葭	葮	葯
U+847x	葰	葱	葲	葳	葴	葵	葶	葷	葸	葹	葺	葻	葼	葽	葾	葿
U+848x	蒀	蒁	蒂	蒃	蒄	蒅	蒆	蒇	蒈	蒉	蒊	蒋	蒌	蒍	蒎	蒏
U+849x	蒐	蒑	蒒	蒓	蒔	蒕	蒖	蒗	蒘	蒙	蒚	蒛	蒜	蒝	蒞	蒟
U+84Ax	蒠	蒡	蒢	蒣	蒤	蒥	蒦	蒧	蒨	蒩	蒪	蒫	蒬	蒭	蒮	蒯
U+84Bx	蒰	蒱	蒲	蒳	蒴	蒵	蒶	蒷	蒸	蒹	蒺	蒻	蒼	蒽	蒾	蒿
U+84Cx	蓀	蓁	蓂	蓃	蓄	蓅	蓆	蓇	蓈	蓉	蓊	蓋	蓌	蓍	蓎	蓏
U+84Dx	蓐	蓑	蓒	蓓	蓔	蓕	蓖	蓗	蓘	蓙	蓚	蓛	蓜	蓝	蓞	蓟
U+84Ex	蓠	蓡	蓢	蓣	蓤	蓥	蓦	蓧	蓨	蓩	蓪	蓫	蓬	蓭	蓮	蓯
U+84Fx	蓰	蓱	蓲	蓳	蓴	蓵	蓶	蓷	蓸	蓹	蓺	蓻	蓼	蓽	蓾	蓿
U+850x	蔀	蔁	蔂	蔃	蔄	蔅	蔆	蔇	蔈	蔉	蔊	蔋	蔌	蔍	蔎	蔏
U+851x	蔐	蔑	蔒	蔓	蔔	蔕	蔖	蔗	蔘	蔙	蔚	蔛	蔜	蔝	蔞	蔟
U+852x	蔠	蔡	蔢	蔣	蔤	蔥	蔦	蔧	蔨	蔩	蔪	蔫	蔬	蔭	蔮	蔯
U+853x	蔰	蔱	蔲	蔳	蔴	蔵	蔶	蔷	蔸	蔹	蔺	蔻	蔼	蔽	蔾	蔿
U+854x	蕀	蕁	蕂	蕃	蕄	蕅	蕆	蕇	蕈	蕉	蕊	蕋	蕌	蕍	蕎	蕏
U+855x	蕐	蕑	蕒	蕓	蕔	蕕	蕖	蕗	蕘	蕙	蕚	蕛	蕜	蕝	蕞	蕟
U+856x	蕠	蕡	蕢	蕣	蕤	蕥	蕦	蕧	蕨	蕩	蕪	蕫	蕬	蕭	蕮	蕯
U+857x	蕰	蕱	蕲	蕳	蕴	蕵	蕶	蕷	蕸	蕹	蕺	蕻	蕼	蕽	蕾	蕿
U+858x	薀	薁	薂	薃	薄	薅	薆	薇	薈	薉	薊	薋	薌	薍	薎	薏
U+859x	薐	薑	薒	薓	薔	薕	薖	薗	薘	薙	薚	薛	薜	薝	薞	薟
U+85Ax	薠	薡	薢	薣	薤	薥	薦	薧	薨	薩	薪	薫	薬	薭	薮	薯
U+85Bx	薰	薱	薲	薳	薴	薵	薶	薷	薸	薹	薺	薻	薼	薽	薾	薿
U+85Cx	藀	藁	藂	藃	藄	藅	藆	藇	藈	藉	藊	藋	藌	藍	藎	藏
U+85Dx	藐	藑	藒	藓	藔	藕	藖	藗	藘	藙	藚	藛	藜	藝	藞	藟
U+85Ex	藠	藡	藢	藣	藤	藥	藦	藧	藨	藩	藪	藫	藬	藭	藮	藯
U+85Fx	藰	藱	藲	藳	藴	藵	藶	藷	藸	藹	藺	藻	藼	藽	藾	藿
U+860x	蘀	蘁	蘂	蘃	蘄	蘅	蘆	蘇	蘈	蘉	蘊	蘋	蘌	蘍	蘎	蘏
U+861x	蘐	蘑	蘒	蘓	蘔	蘕	蘖	蘗	蘘	蘙	蘚	蘛	蘜	蘝	蘞	蘟
U+862x	蘠	蘡	蘢	蘣	蘤	蘥	蘦	蘧	蘨	蘩	蘪	蘫	蘬	蘭	蘮	蘯
U+863x	蘰	蘱	蘲	蘳	蘴	蘵	蘶	蘷	蘸	蘹	蘺	蘻	蘼	蘽	蘾	蘿
U+864x	虀	虁	虂	虃	虄	虅	虆	虇	虈	虉	虊	虋	虌	虍	虎	虏
U+865x	虐	虑	虒	虓	虔	處	虖	虗	虘	虙	虚	虛	虜	虝	虞	號
U+866x	虠	虡	虢	虣	虤	虥	虦	虧	虨	虩	虪	虫	虬	虭	虮	虯
U+867x	虰	虱	虲	虳	虴	虵	虶	虷	虸	虹	虺	虻	虼	虽	虾	虿
U+868x	蚀	蚁	蚂	蚃	蚄	蚅	蚆	蚇	蚈	蚉	蚊	蚋	蚌	蚍	蚎	蚏
U+869x	蚐	蚑	蚒	蚓	蚔	蚕	蚖	蚗	蚘	蚙	蚚	蚛	蚜	蚝	蚞	蚟
U+86Ax	蚠	蚡	蚢	蚣	蚤	蚥	蚦	蚧	蚨	蚩	蚪	蚫	蚬	蚭	蚮	蚯
U+86Bx	蚰	蚱	蚲	蚳	蚴	蚵	蚶	蚷	蚸	蚹	蚺	蚻	蚼	蚽	蚾	蚿
U+86Cx	蛀	蛁	蛂	蛃	蛄	蛅	蛆	蛇	蛈	蛉	蛊	蛋	蛌	蛍	蛎	蛏
U+86Dx	蛐	蛑	蛒	蛓	蛔	蛕	蛖	蛗	蛘	蛙	蛚	蛛	蛜	蛝	蛞	蛟
U+86Ex	蛠	蛡	蛢	蛣	蛤	蛥	蛦	蛧	蛨	蛩	蛪	蛫	蛬	蛭	蛮	蛯
U+86Fx	蛰	蛱	蛲	蛳	蛴	蛵	蛶	蛷	蛸	蛹	蛺	蛻	蛼	蛽	蛾	蛿
U+870x	蜀	蜁	蜂	蜃	蜄	蜅	蜆	蜇	蜈	蜉	蜊	蜋	蜌	蜍	蜎	蜏
U+871x	蜐	蜑	蜒	蜓	蜔	蜕	蜖	蜗	蜘	蜙	蜚	蜛	蜜	蜝	蜞	蜟
U+872x	蜠	蜡	蜢	蜣	蜤	蜥	蜦	蜧	蜨	蜩	蜪	蜫	蜬	蜭	蜮	蜯
U+873x	蜰	蜱	蜲	蜳	蜴	蜵	蜶	蜷	蜸	蜹	蜺	蜻	蜼	蜽	蜾	蜿
U+874x	蝀	蝁	蝂	蝃	蝄	蝅	蝆	蝇	蝈	蝉	蝊	蝋	蝌	蝍	蝎	蝏
U+875x	蝐	蝑	蝒	蝓	蝔	蝕	蝖	蝗	蝘	蝙	蝚	蝛	蝜	蝝	蝞	蝟
U+876x	蝠	蝡	蝢	蝣	蝤	蝥	蝦	蝧	蝨	蝩	蝪	蝫	蝬	蝭	蝮	蝯
U+877x	蝰	蝱	蝲	蝳	蝴	蝵	蝶	蝷	蝸	蝹	蝺	蝻	蝼	蝽	蝾	蝿
U+878x	螀	螁	螂	螃	螄	螅	螆	螇	螈	螉	螊	螋	螌	融	螎	螏
U+879x	螐	螑	螒	螓	螔	螕	螖	螗	螘	螙	螚	螛	螜	螝	螞	螟
U+87Ax	螠	螡	螢	螣	螤	螥	螦	螧	螨	螩	螪	螫	螬	螭	螮	螯
U+87Bx	螰	螱	螲	螳	螴	螵	螶	螷	螸	螹	螺	螻	螼	螽	螾	螿
U+87Cx	蟀	蟁	蟂	蟃	蟄	蟅	蟆	蟇	蟈	蟉	蟊	蟋	蟌	蟍	蟎	蟏
U+87Dx	蟐	蟑	蟒	蟓	蟔	蟕	蟖	蟗	蟘	蟙	蟚	蟛	蟜	蟝	蟞	蟟
U+87Ex	蟠	蟡	蟢	蟣	蟤	蟥	蟦	蟧	蟨	蟩	蟪	蟫	蟬	蟭	蟮	蟯
U+87Fx	蟰	蟱	蟲	蟳	蟴	蟵	蟶	蟷	蟸	蟹	蟺	蟻	蟼	蟽	蟾	蟿
U+880x	蠀	蠁	蠂	蠃	蠄	蠅	蠆	蠇	蠈	蠉	蠊	蠋	蠌	蠍	蠎	蠏
U+881x	蠐	蠑	蠒	蠓	蠔	蠕	蠖	蠗	蠘	蠙	蠚	蠛	蠜	蠝	蠞	蠟
U+882x	蠠	蠡	蠢	蠣	蠤	蠥	蠦	蠧	蠨	蠩	蠪	蠫	蠬	蠭	蠮	蠯
U+883x	蠰	蠱	蠲	蠳	蠴	蠵	蠶	蠷	蠸	蠹	蠺	蠻	蠼	蠽	蠾	蠿
U+884x	血	衁	衂	衃	衄	衅	衆	衇	衈	衉	衊	衋	行	衍	衎	衏
U+885x	衐	衑	衒	術	衔	衕	衖	街	衘	衙	衚	衛	衜	衝	衞	衟
U+886x	衠	衡	衢	衣	衤	补	衦	衧	表	衩	衪	衫	衬	衭	衮	衯
U+887x	衰	衱	衲	衳	衴	衵	衶	衷	衸	衹	衺	衻	衼	衽	衾	衿
U+888x	袀	袁	袂	袃	袄	袅	袆	袇	袈	袉	袊	袋	袌	袍	袎	袏
U+889x	袐	袑	袒	袓	袔	袕	袖	袗	袘	袙	袚	袛	袜	袝	袞	袟
U+88Ax	袠	袡	袢	袣	袤	袥	袦	袧	袨	袩	袪	被	袬	袭	袮	袯
U+88Bx	袰	袱	袲	袳	袴	袵	袶	袷	袸	袹	袺	袻	袼	袽	袾	袿
U+88Cx	裀	裁	裂	裃	裄	装	裆	裇	裈	裉	裊	裋	裌	裍	裎	裏
U+88Dx	裐	裑	裒	裓	裔	裕	裖	裗	裘	裙	裚	裛	補	裝	裞	裟
U+88Ex	裠	裡	裢	裣	裤	裥	裦	裧	裨	裩	裪	裫	裬	裭	裮	裯
U+88Fx	裰	裱	裲	裳	裴	裵	裶	裷	裸	裹	裺	裻	裼	製	裾	裿
U+890x	褀	褁	褂	褃	褄	褅	褆	複	褈	褉	褊	褋	褌	褍	褎	褏
U+891x	褐	褑	褒	褓	褔	褕	褖	褗	褘	褙	褚	褛	褜	褝	褞	褟
U+892x	褠	褡	褢	褣	褤	褥	褦	褧	褨	褩	褪	褫	褬	褭	褮	褯
U+893x	褰	褱	褲	褳	褴	褵	褶	褷	褸	褹	褺	褻	褼	褽	褾	褿
U+894x	襀	襁	襂	襃	襄	襅	襆	襇	襈	襉	襊	襋	襌	襍	襎	襏
U+895x	襐	襑	襒	襓	襔	襕	襖	襗	襘	襙	襚	襛	襜	襝	襞	襟
U+896x	襠	襡	襢	襣	襤	襥	襦	襧	襨	襩	襪	襫	襬	襭	襮	襯
U+897x	襰	襱	襲	襳	襴	襵	襶	襷	襸	襹	襺	襻	襼	襽	襾	西
U+898x	覀	要	覂	覃	覄	覅	覆	覇	覈	覉	覊	見	覌	覍	覎	規
U+899x	覐	覑	覒	覓	覔	覕	視	覗	覘	覙	覚	覛	覜	覝	覞	覟
U+89Ax	覠	覡	覢	覣	覤	覥	覦	覧	覨	覩	親	覫	覬	覭	覮	覯
U+89Bx	覰	覱	覲	観	覴	覵	覶	覷	覸	覹	覺	覻	覼	覽	覾	覿
U+89Cx	觀	见	观	觃	规	觅	视	觇	览	觉	觊	觋	觌	觍	觎	觏
U+89Dx	觐	觑	角	觓	觔	觕	觖	觗	觘	觙	觚	觛	觜	觝	觞	觟
U+89Ex	觠	觡	觢	解	觤	觥	触	觧	觨	觩	觪	觫	觬	觭	觮	觯
U+89Fx	觰	觱	觲	觳	觴	觵	觶	觷	觸	觹	觺	觻	觼	觽	觾	觿
U+8A0x	言	訁	訂	訃	訄	訅	訆	訇	計	訉	訊	訋	訌	訍	討	訏
U+8A1x	訐	訑	訒	訓	訔	訕	訖	託	記	訙	訚	訛	訜	訝	訞	訟
U+8A2x	訠	訡	訢	訣	訤	訥	訦	訧	訨	訩	訪	訫	訬	設	訮	訯
U+8A3x	訰	許	訲	訳	訴	訵	訶	訷	訸	訹	診	註	証	訽	訾	訿
U+8A4x	詀	詁	詂	詃	詄	詅	詆	詇	詈	詉	詊	詋	詌	詍	詎	詏
U+8A5x	詐	詑	詒	詓	詔	評	詖	詗	詘	詙	詚	詛	詜	詝	詞	詟
U+8A6x	詠	詡	詢	詣	詤	詥	試	詧	詨	詩	詪	詫	詬	詭	詮	詯
U+8A7x	詰	話	該	詳	詴	詵	詶	詷	詸	詹	詺	詻	詼	詽	詾	詿
U+8A8x	誀	誁	誂	誃	誄	誅	誆	誇	誈	誉	誊	誋	誌	認	誎	誏
U+8A9x	誐	誑	誒	誓	誔	誕	誖	誗	誘	誙	誚	誛	誜	誝	語	誟
U+8AAx	誠	誡	誢	誣	誤	誥	誦	誧	誨	誩	說	誫	説	読	誮	誯
U+8ABx	誰	誱	課	誳	誴	誵	誶	誷	誸	誹	誺	誻	誼	誽	誾	調
U+8ACx	諀	諁	諂	諃	諄	諅	諆	談	諈	諉	諊	請	諌	諍	諎	諏
U+8ADx	諐	諑	諒	諓	諔	諕	論	諗	諘	諙	諚	諛	諜	諝	諞	諟
U+8AEx	諠	諡	諢	諣	諤	諥	諦	諧	諨	諩	諪	諫	諬	諭	諮	諯
U+8AFx	諰	諱	諲	諳	諴	諵	諶	諷	諸	諹	諺	諻	諼	諽	諾	諿
U+8B0x	謀	謁	謂	謃	謄	謅	謆	謇	謈	謉	謊	謋	謌	謍	謎	謏
U+8B1x	謐	謑	謒	謓	謔	謕	謖	謗	謘	謙	謚	講	謜	謝	謞	謟
U+8B2x	謠	謡	謢	謣	謤	謥	謦	謧	謨	謩	謪	謫	謬	謭	謮	謯
U+8B3x	謰	謱	謲	謳	謴	謵	謶	謷	謸	謹	謺	謻	謼	謽	謾	謿
U+8B4x	譀	譁	譂	譃	譄	譅	譆	譇	譈	證	譊	譋	譌	譍	譎	譏
U+8B5x	譐	譑	譒	譓	譔	譕	譖	譗	識	譙	譚	譛	譜	譝	譞	譟
U+8B6x	譠	譡	譢	譣	譤	譥	警	譧	譨	譩	譪	譫	譬	譭	譮	譯
U+8B7x	議	譱	譲	譳	譴	譵	譶	護	譸	譹	譺	譻	譼	譽	譾	譿
U+8B8x	讀	讁	讂	讃	讄	讅	讆	讇	讈	讉	變	讋	讌	讍	讎	讏
U+8B9x	讐	讑	讒	讓	讔	讕	讖	讗	讘	讙	讚	讛	讜	讝	讞	讟
U+8BAx	讠	计	订	讣	认	讥	讦	讧	讨	让	讪	讫	讬	训	议	讯
U+8BBx	记	讱	讲	讳	讴	讵	讶	讷	许	讹	论	讻	讼	讽	设	访
U+8BCx	诀	证	诂	诃	评	诅	识	诇	诈	诉	诊	诋	诌	词	诎	诏
U+8BDx	诐	译	诒	诓	诔	试	诖	诗	诘	诙	诚	诛	诜	话	诞	诟
U+8BEx	诠	诡	询	诣	诤	该	详	诧	诨	诩	诪	诫	诬	语	诮	误
U+8BFx	诰	诱	诲	诳	说	诵	诶	请	诸	诹	诺	读	诼	诽	课	诿
U+8C0x	谀	谁	谂	调	谄	谅	谆	谇	谈	谉	谊	谋	谌	谍	谎	谏
U+8C1x	谐	谑	谒	谓	谔	谕	谖	谗	谘	谙	谚	谛	谜	谝	谞	谟
U+8C2x	谠	谡	谢	谣	谤	谥	谦	谧	谨	谩	谪	谫	谬	谭	谮	谯
U+8C3x	谰	谱	谲	谳	谴	谵	谶	谷	谸	谹	谺	谻	谼	谽	谾	谿
U+8C4x	豀	豁	豂	豃	豄	豅	豆	豇	豈	豉	豊	豋	豌	豍	豎	豏
U+8C5x	豐	豑	豒	豓	豔	豕	豖	豗	豘	豙	豚	豛	豜	豝	豞	豟
U+8C6x	豠	象	豢	豣	豤	豥	豦	豧	豨	豩	豪	豫	豬	豭	豮	豯
U+8C7x	豰	豱	豲	豳	豴	豵	豶	豷	豸	豹	豺	豻	豼	豽	豾	豿
U+8C8x	貀	貁	貂	貃	貄	貅	貆	貇	貈	貉	貊	貋	貌	貍	貎	貏
U+8C9x	貐	貑	貒	貓	貔	貕	貖	貗	貘	貙	貚	貛	貜	貝	貞	貟
U+8CAx	負	財	貢	貣	貤	貥	貦	貧	貨	販	貪	貫	責	貭	貮	貯
U+8CBx	貰	貱	貲	貳	貴	貵	貶	買	貸	貹	貺	費	貼	貽	貾	貿
U+8CCx	賀	賁	賂	賃	賄	賅	賆	資	賈	賉	賊	賋	賌	賍	賎	賏
U+8CDx	賐	賑	賒	賓	賔	賕	賖	賗	賘	賙	賚	賛	賜	賝	賞	賟
U+8CEx	賠	賡	賢	賣	賤	賥	賦	賧	賨	賩	質	賫	賬	賭	賮	賯
U+8CFx	賰	賱	賲	賳	賴	賵	賶	賷	賸	賹	賺	賻	購	賽	賾	賿
Notes 1.As of Unicode version 18.0
