= List of CJK Unified Ideographs, part 1 of 4 =

CJK Unified Ideographs (Part 1 of 4)^{[1]} Official Unicode Consortium code chart (PDF)
	0	1	2	3	4	5	6	7	8	9	A	B	C	D	E	F
U+4E0x	一	丁	丂	七	丄	丅	丆	万	丈	三	上	下	丌	不	与	丏
U+4E1x	丐	丑	丒	专	且	丕	世	丗	丘	丙	业	丛	东	丝	丞	丟
U+4E2x	丠	両	丢	丣	两	严	並	丧	丨	丩	个	丫	丬	中	丮	丯
U+4E3x	丰	丱	串	丳	临	丵	丶	丷	丸	丹	为	主	丼	丽	举	丿
U+4E4x	乀	乁	乂	乃	乄	久	乆	乇	么	义	乊	之	乌	乍	乎	乏
U+4E5x	乐	乑	乒	乓	乔	乕	乖	乗	乘	乙	乚	乛	乜	九	乞	也
U+4E6x	习	乡	乢	乣	乤	乥	书	乧	乨	乩	乪	乫	乬	乭	乮	乯
U+4E7x	买	乱	乲	乳	乴	乵	乶	乷	乸	乹	乺	乻	乼	乽	乾	乿
U+4E8x	亀	亁	亂	亃	亄	亅	了	亇	予	争	亊	事	二	亍	于	亏
U+4E9x	亐	云	互	亓	五	井	亖	亗	亘	亙	亚	些	亜	亝	亞	亟
U+4EAx	亠	亡	亢	亣	交	亥	亦	产	亨	亩	亪	享	京	亭	亮	亯
U+4EBx	亰	亱	亲	亳	亴	亵	亶	亷	亸	亹	人	亻	亼	亽	亾	亿
U+4ECx	什	仁	仂	仃	仄	仅	仆	仇	仈	仉	今	介	仌	仍	从	仏
U+4EDx	仐	仑	仒	仓	仔	仕	他	仗	付	仙	仚	仛	仜	仝	仞	仟
U+4EEx	仠	仡	仢	代	令	以	仦	仧	仨	仩	仪	仫	们	仭	仮	仯
U+4EFx	仰	仱	仲	仳	仴	仵	件	价	仸	仹	仺	任	仼	份	仾	仿
U+4F0x	伀	企	伂	伃	伄	伅	伆	伇	伈	伉	伊	伋	伌	伍	伎	伏
U+4F1x	伐	休	伒	伓	伔	伕	伖	众	优	伙	会	伛	伜	伝	伞	伟
U+4F2x	传	伡	伢	伣	伤	伥	伦	伧	伨	伩	伪	伫	伬	伭	伮	伯
U+4F3x	估	伱	伲	伳	伴	伵	伶	伷	伸	伹	伺	伻	似	伽	伾	伿
U+4F4x	佀	佁	佂	佃	佄	佅	但	佇	佈	佉	佊	佋	佌	位	低	住
U+4F5x	佐	佑	佒	体	佔	何	佖	佗	佘	余	佚	佛	作	佝	佞	佟
U+4F6x	你	佡	佢	佣	佤	佥	佦	佧	佨	佩	佪	佫	佬	佭	佮	佯
U+4F7x	佰	佱	佲	佳	佴	併	佶	佷	佸	佹	佺	佻	佼	佽	佾	使
U+4F8x	侀	侁	侂	侃	侄	侅	來	侇	侈	侉	侊	例	侌	侍	侎	侏
U+4F9x	侐	侑	侒	侓	侔	侕	侖	侗	侘	侙	侚	供	侜	依	侞	侟
U+4FAx	侠	価	侢	侣	侤	侥	侦	侧	侨	侩	侪	侫	侬	侭	侮	侯
U+4FBx	侰	侱	侲	侳	侴	侵	侶	侷	侸	侹	侺	侻	侼	侽	侾	便
U+4FCx	俀	俁	係	促	俄	俅	俆	俇	俈	俉	俊	俋	俌	俍	俎	俏
U+4FDx	俐	俑	俒	俓	俔	俕	俖	俗	俘	俙	俚	俛	俜	保	俞	俟
U+4FEx	俠	信	俢	俣	俤	俥	俦	俧	俨	俩	俪	俫	俬	俭	修	俯
U+4FFx	俰	俱	俲	俳	俴	俵	俶	俷	俸	俹	俺	俻	俼	俽	俾	俿
U+500x	倀	倁	倂	倃	倄	倅	倆	倇	倈	倉	倊	個	倌	倍	倎	倏
U+501x	倐	們	倒	倓	倔	倕	倖	倗	倘	候	倚	倛	倜	倝	倞	借
U+502x	倠	倡	倢	倣	値	倥	倦	倧	倨	倩	倪	倫	倬	倭	倮	倯
U+503x	倰	倱	倲	倳	倴	倵	倶	倷	倸	倹	债	倻	值	倽	倾	倿
U+504x	偀	偁	偂	偃	偄	偅	偆	假	偈	偉	偊	偋	偌	偍	偎	偏
U+505x	偐	偑	偒	偓	偔	偕	偖	偗	偘	偙	做	偛	停	偝	偞	偟
U+506x	偠	偡	偢	偣	偤	健	偦	偧	偨	偩	偪	偫	偬	偭	偮	偯
U+507x	偰	偱	偲	偳	側	偵	偶	偷	偸	偹	偺	偻	偼	偽	偾	偿
U+508x	傀	傁	傂	傃	傄	傅	傆	傇	傈	傉	傊	傋	傌	傍	傎	傏
U+509x	傐	傑	傒	傓	傔	傕	傖	傗	傘	備	傚	傛	傜	傝	傞	傟
U+50Ax	傠	傡	傢	傣	傤	傥	傦	傧	储	傩	傪	傫	催	傭	傮	傯
U+50Bx	傰	傱	傲	傳	傴	債	傶	傷	傸	傹	傺	傻	傼	傽	傾	傿
U+50Cx	僀	僁	僂	僃	僄	僅	僆	僇	僈	僉	僊	僋	僌	働	僎	像
U+50Dx	僐	僑	僒	僓	僔	僕	僖	僗	僘	僙	僚	僛	僜	僝	僞	僟
U+50Ex	僠	僡	僢	僣	僤	僥	僦	僧	僨	僩	僪	僫	僬	僭	僮	僯
U+50Fx	僰	僱	僲	僳	僴	僵	僶	僷	僸	價	僺	僻	僼	僽	僾	僿
U+510x	儀	儁	儂	儃	億	儅	儆	儇	儈	儉	儊	儋	儌	儍	儎	儏
U+511x	儐	儑	儒	儓	儔	儕	儖	儗	儘	儙	儚	儛	儜	儝	儞	償
U+512x	儠	儡	儢	儣	儤	儥	儦	儧	儨	儩	優	儫	儬	儭	儮	儯
U+513x	儰	儱	儲	儳	儴	儵	儶	儷	儸	儹	儺	儻	儼	儽	儾	儿
U+514x	兀	允	兂	元	兄	充	兆	兇	先	光	兊	克	兌	免	兎	兏
U+515x	児	兑	兒	兓	兔	兕	兖	兗	兘	兙	党	兛	兜	兝	兞	兟
U+516x	兠	兡	兢	兣	兤	入	兦	內	全	兩	兪	八	公	六	兮	兯
U+517x	兰	共	兲	关	兴	兵	其	具	典	兹	兺	养	兼	兽	兾	兿
U+518x	冀	冁	冂	冃	冄	内	円	冇	冈	冉	冊	冋	册	再	冎	冏
U+519x	冐	冑	冒	冓	冔	冕	冖	冗	冘	写	冚	军	农	冝	冞	冟
U+51Ax	冠	冡	冢	冣	冤	冥	冦	冧	冨	冩	冪	冫	冬	冭	冮	冯
U+51Bx	冰	冱	冲	决	冴	况	冶	冷	冸	冹	冺	冻	冼	冽	冾	冿
U+51Cx	净	凁	凂	凃	凄	凅	准	凇	凈	凉	凊	凋	凌	凍	凎	减
U+51Dx	凐	凑	凒	凓	凔	凕	凖	凗	凘	凙	凚	凛	凜	凝	凞	凟
U+51Ex	几	凡	凢	凣	凤	凥	処	凧	凨	凩	凪	凫	凬	凭	凮	凯
U+51Fx	凰	凱	凲	凳	凴	凵	凶	凷	凸	凹	出	击	凼	函	凾	凿
U+520x	刀	刁	刂	刃	刄	刅	分	切	刈	刉	刊	刋	刌	刍	刎	刏
U+521x	刐	刑	划	刓	刔	刕	刖	列	刘	则	刚	创	刜	初	刞	刟
U+522x	删	刡	刢	刣	判	別	刦	刧	刨	利	刪	别	刬	刭	刮	刯
U+523x	到	刱	刲	刳	刴	刵	制	刷	券	刹	刺	刻	刼	刽	刾	刿
U+524x	剀	剁	剂	剃	剄	剅	剆	則	剈	剉	削	剋	剌	前	剎	剏
U+525x	剐	剑	剒	剓	剔	剕	剖	剗	剘	剙	剚	剛	剜	剝	剞	剟
U+526x	剠	剡	剢	剣	剤	剥	剦	剧	剨	剩	剪	剫	剬	剭	剮	副
U+527x	剰	剱	割	剳	剴	創	剶	剷	剸	剹	剺	剻	剼	剽	剾	剿
U+528x	劀	劁	劂	劃	劄	劅	劆	劇	劈	劉	劊	劋	劌	劍	劎	劏
U+529x	劐	劑	劒	劓	劔	劕	劖	劗	劘	劙	劚	力	劜	劝	办	功
U+52Ax	加	务	劢	劣	劤	劥	劦	劧	动	助	努	劫	劬	劭	劮	劯
U+52Bx	劰	励	劲	劳	労	劵	劶	劷	劸	効	劺	劻	劼	劽	劾	势
U+52Cx	勀	勁	勂	勃	勄	勅	勆	勇	勈	勉	勊	勋	勌	勍	勎	勏
U+52Dx	勐	勑	勒	勓	勔	動	勖	勗	勘	務	勚	勛	勜	勝	勞	募
U+52Ex	勠	勡	勢	勣	勤	勥	勦	勧	勨	勩	勪	勫	勬	勭	勮	勯
U+52Fx	勰	勱	勲	勳	勴	勵	勶	勷	勸	勹	勺	勻	勼	勽	勾	勿
U+530x	匀	匁	匂	匃	匄	包	匆	匇	匈	匉	匊	匋	匌	匍	匎	匏
U+531x	匐	匑	匒	匓	匔	匕	化	北	匘	匙	匚	匛	匜	匝	匞	匟
U+532x	匠	匡	匢	匣	匤	匥	匦	匧	匨	匩	匪	匫	匬	匭	匮	匯
U+533x	匰	匱	匲	匳	匴	匵	匶	匷	匸	匹	区	医	匼	匽	匾	匿
U+534x	區	十	卂	千	卄	卅	卆	升	午	卉	半	卋	卌	卍	华	协
U+535x	卐	卑	卒	卓	協	单	卖	南	単	卙	博	卛	卜	卝	卞	卟
U+536x	占	卡	卢	卣	卤	卥	卦	卧	卨	卩	卪	卫	卬	卭	卮	卯
U+537x	印	危	卲	即	却	卵	卶	卷	卸	卹	卺	卻	卼	卽	卾	卿
U+538x	厀	厁	厂	厃	厄	厅	历	厇	厈	厉	厊	压	厌	厍	厎	厏
U+539x	厐	厑	厒	厓	厔	厕	厖	厗	厘	厙	厚	厛	厜	厝	厞	原
U+53Ax	厠	厡	厢	厣	厤	厥	厦	厧	厨	厩	厪	厫	厬	厭	厮	厯
U+53Bx	厰	厱	厲	厳	厴	厵	厶	厷	厸	厹	厺	去	厼	厽	厾	县
U+53Cx	叀	叁	参	參	叄	叅	叆	叇	又	叉	及	友	双	反	収	叏
U+53Dx	叐	发	叒	叓	叔	叕	取	受	变	叙	叚	叛	叜	叝	叞	叟
U+53Ex	叠	叡	叢	口	古	句	另	叧	叨	叩	只	叫	召	叭	叮	可
U+53Fx	台	叱	史	右	叴	叵	叶	号	司	叹	叺	叻	叼	叽	叾	叿
U+540x	吀	吁	吂	吃	各	吅	吆	吇	合	吉	吊	吋	同	名	后	吏
U+541x	吐	向	吒	吓	吔	吕	吖	吗	吘	吙	吚	君	吜	吝	吞	吟
U+542x	吠	吡	吢	吣	吤	吥	否	吧	吨	吩	吪	含	听	吭	吮	启
U+543x	吰	吱	吲	吳	吴	吵	吶	吷	吸	吹	吺	吻	吼	吽	吾	吿
U+544x	呀	呁	呂	呃	呄	呅	呆	呇	呈	呉	告	呋	呌	呍	呎	呏
U+545x	呐	呑	呒	呓	呔	呕	呖	呗	员	呙	呚	呛	呜	呝	呞	呟
U+546x	呠	呡	呢	呣	呤	呥	呦	呧	周	呩	呪	呫	呬	呭	呮	呯
U+547x	呰	呱	呲	味	呴	呵	呶	呷	呸	呹	呺	呻	呼	命	呾	呿
U+548x	咀	咁	咂	咃	咄	咅	咆	咇	咈	咉	咊	咋	和	咍	咎	咏
U+549x	咐	咑	咒	咓	咔	咕	咖	咗	咘	咙	咚	咛	咜	咝	咞	咟
U+54Ax	咠	咡	咢	咣	咤	咥	咦	咧	咨	咩	咪	咫	咬	咭	咮	咯
U+54Bx	咰	咱	咲	咳	咴	咵	咶	咷	咸	咹	咺	咻	咼	咽	咾	咿
U+54Cx	哀	品	哂	哃	哄	哅	哆	哇	哈	哉	哊	哋	哌	响	哎	哏
U+54Dx	哐	哑	哒	哓	哔	哕	哖	哗	哘	哙	哚	哛	哜	哝	哞	哟
U+54Ex	哠	員	哢	哣	哤	哥	哦	哧	哨	哩	哪	哫	哬	哭	哮	哯
U+54Fx	哰	哱	哲	哳	哴	哵	哶	哷	哸	哹	哺	哻	哼	哽	哾	哿
U+550x	唀	唁	唂	唃	唄	唅	唆	唇	唈	唉	唊	唋	唌	唍	唎	唏
U+551x	唐	唑	唒	唓	唔	唕	唖	唗	唘	唙	唚	唛	唜	唝	唞	唟
U+552x	唠	唡	唢	唣	唤	唥	唦	唧	唨	唩	唪	唫	唬	唭	售	唯
U+553x	唰	唱	唲	唳	唴	唵	唶	唷	唸	唹	唺	唻	唼	唽	唾	唿
U+554x	啀	啁	啂	啃	啄	啅	商	啇	啈	啉	啊	啋	啌	啍	啎	問
U+555x	啐	啑	啒	啓	啔	啕	啖	啗	啘	啙	啚	啛	啜	啝	啞	啟
U+556x	啠	啡	啢	啣	啤	啥	啦	啧	啨	啩	啪	啫	啬	啭	啮	啯
U+557x	啰	啱	啲	啳	啴	啵	啶	啷	啸	啹	啺	啻	啼	啽	啾	啿
U+558x	喀	喁	喂	喃	善	喅	喆	喇	喈	喉	喊	喋	喌	喍	喎	喏
U+559x	喐	喑	喒	喓	喔	喕	喖	喗	喘	喙	喚	喛	喜	喝	喞	喟
U+55Ax	喠	喡	喢	喣	喤	喥	喦	喧	喨	喩	喪	喫	喬	喭	單	喯
U+55Bx	喰	喱	喲	喳	喴	喵	営	喷	喸	喹	喺	喻	喼	喽	喾	喿
U+55Cx	嗀	嗁	嗂	嗃	嗄	嗅	嗆	嗇	嗈	嗉	嗊	嗋	嗌	嗍	嗎	嗏
U+55Dx	嗐	嗑	嗒	嗓	嗔	嗕	嗖	嗗	嗘	嗙	嗚	嗛	嗜	嗝	嗞	嗟
U+55Ex	嗠	嗡	嗢	嗣	嗤	嗥	嗦	嗧	嗨	嗩	嗪	嗫	嗬	嗭	嗮	嗯
U+55Fx	嗰	嗱	嗲	嗳	嗴	嗵	嗶	嗷	嗸	嗹	嗺	嗻	嗼	嗽	嗾	嗿
U+560x	嘀	嘁	嘂	嘃	嘄	嘅	嘆	嘇	嘈	嘉	嘊	嘋	嘌	嘍	嘎	嘏
U+561x	嘐	嘑	嘒	嘓	嘔	嘕	嘖	嘗	嘘	嘙	嘚	嘛	嘜	嘝	嘞	嘟
U+562x	嘠	嘡	嘢	嘣	嘤	嘥	嘦	嘧	嘨	嘩	嘪	嘫	嘬	嘭	嘮	嘯
U+563x	嘰	嘱	嘲	嘳	嘴	嘵	嘶	嘷	嘸	嘹	嘺	嘻	嘼	嘽	嘾	嘿
U+564x	噀	噁	噂	噃	噄	噅	噆	噇	噈	噉	噊	噋	噌	噍	噎	噏
U+565x	噐	噑	噒	噓	噔	噕	噖	噗	噘	噙	噚	噛	噜	噝	噞	噟
U+566x	噠	噡	噢	噣	噤	噥	噦	噧	器	噩	噪	噫	噬	噭	噮	噯
U+567x	噰	噱	噲	噳	噴	噵	噶	噷	噸	噹	噺	噻	噼	噽	噾	噿
U+568x	嚀	嚁	嚂	嚃	嚄	嚅	嚆	嚇	嚈	嚉	嚊	嚋	嚌	嚍	嚎	嚏
U+569x	嚐	嚑	嚒	嚓	嚔	嚕	嚖	嚗	嚘	嚙	嚚	嚛	嚜	嚝	嚞	嚟
U+56Ax	嚠	嚡	嚢	嚣	嚤	嚥	嚦	嚧	嚨	嚩	嚪	嚫	嚬	嚭	嚮	嚯
U+56Bx	嚰	嚱	嚲	嚳	嚴	嚵	嚶	嚷	嚸	嚹	嚺	嚻	嚼	嚽	嚾	嚿
U+56Cx	囀	囁	囂	囃	囄	囅	囆	囇	囈	囉	囊	囋	囌	囍	囎	囏
U+56Dx	囐	囑	囒	囓	囔	囕	囖	囗	囘	囙	囚	四	囜	囝	回	囟
U+56Ex	因	囡	团	団	囤	囥	囦	囧	囨	囩	囪	囫	囬	园	囮	囯
U+56Fx	困	囱	囲	図	围	囵	囶	囷	囸	囹	固	囻	囼	国	图	囿
U+570x	圀	圁	圂	圃	圄	圅	圆	圇	圈	圉	圊	國	圌	圍	圎	圏
U+571x	圐	圑	園	圓	圔	圕	圖	圗	團	圙	圚	圛	圜	圝	圞	土
U+572x	圠	圡	圢	圣	圤	圥	圦	圧	在	圩	圪	圫	圬	圭	圮	圯
U+573x	地	圱	圲	圳	圴	圵	圶	圷	圸	圹	场	圻	圼	圽	圾	圿
U+574x	址	坁	坂	坃	坄	坅	坆	均	坈	坉	坊	坋	坌	坍	坎	坏
U+575x	坐	坑	坒	坓	坔	坕	坖	块	坘	坙	坚	坛	坜	坝	坞	坟
U+576x	坠	坡	坢	坣	坤	坥	坦	坧	坨	坩	坪	坫	坬	坭	坮	坯
U+577x	坰	坱	坲	坳	坴	坵	坶	坷	坸	坹	坺	坻	坼	坽	坾	坿
U+578x	垀	垁	垂	垃	垄	垅	垆	垇	垈	垉	垊	型	垌	垍	垎	垏
U+579x	垐	垑	垒	垓	垔	垕	垖	垗	垘	垙	垚	垛	垜	垝	垞	垟
U+57Ax	垠	垡	垢	垣	垤	垥	垦	垧	垨	垩	垪	垫	垬	垭	垮	垯
U+57Bx	垰	垱	垲	垳	垴	垵	垶	垷	垸	垹	垺	垻	垼	垽	垾	垿
U+57Cx	埀	埁	埂	埃	埄	埅	埆	埇	埈	埉	埊	埋	埌	埍	城	埏
U+57Dx	埐	埑	埒	埓	埔	埕	埖	埗	埘	埙	埚	埛	埜	埝	埞	域
U+57Ex	埠	埡	埢	埣	埤	埥	埦	埧	埨	埩	埪	埫	埬	埭	埮	埯
U+57Fx	埰	埱	埲	埳	埴	埵	埶	執	埸	培	基	埻	埼	埽	埾	埿
U+580x	堀	堁	堂	堃	堄	堅	堆	堇	堈	堉	堊	堋	堌	堍	堎	堏
U+581x	堐	堑	堒	堓	堔	堕	堖	堗	堘	堙	堚	堛	堜	堝	堞	堟
U+582x	堠	堡	堢	堣	堤	堥	堦	堧	堨	堩	堪	堫	堬	堭	堮	堯
U+583x	堰	報	堲	堳	場	堵	堶	堷	堸	堹	堺	堻	堼	堽	堾	堿
U+584x	塀	塁	塂	塃	塄	塅	塆	塇	塈	塉	塊	塋	塌	塍	塎	塏
U+585x	塐	塑	塒	塓	塔	塕	塖	塗	塘	塙	塚	塛	塜	塝	塞	塟
U+586x	塠	塡	塢	塣	塤	塥	塦	塧	塨	塩	塪	填	塬	塭	塮	塯
U+587x	塰	塱	塲	塳	塴	塵	塶	塷	塸	塹	塺	塻	塼	塽	塾	塿
U+588x	墀	墁	墂	境	墄	墅	墆	墇	墈	墉	墊	墋	墌	墍	墎	墏
U+589x	墐	墑	墒	墓	墔	墕	墖	増	墘	墙	墚	墛	墜	墝	增	墟
U+58Ax	墠	墡	墢	墣	墤	墥	墦	墧	墨	墩	墪	墫	墬	墭	墮	墯
U+58Bx	墰	墱	墲	墳	墴	墵	墶	墷	墸	墹	墺	墻	墼	墽	墾	墿
U+58Cx	壀	壁	壂	壃	壄	壅	壆	壇	壈	壉	壊	壋	壌	壍	壎	壏
U+58Dx	壐	壑	壒	壓	壔	壕	壖	壗	壘	壙	壚	壛	壜	壝	壞	壟
U+58Ex	壠	壡	壢	壣	壤	壥	壦	壧	壨	壩	壪	士	壬	壭	壮	壯
U+58Fx	声	壱	売	壳	壴	壵	壶	壷	壸	壹	壺	壻	壼	壽	壾	壿
U+590x	夀	夁	夂	夃	处	夅	夆	备	夈	変	夊	夋	夌	复	夎	夏
U+591x	夐	夑	夒	夓	夔	夕	外	夗	夘	夙	多	夛	夜	夝	夞	够
U+592x	夠	夡	夢	夣	夤	夥	夦	大	夨	天	太	夫	夬	夭	央	夯
U+593x	夰	失	夲	夳	头	夵	夶	夷	夸	夹	夺	夻	夼	夽	夾	夿
U+594x	奀	奁	奂	奃	奄	奅	奆	奇	奈	奉	奊	奋	奌	奍	奎	奏
U+595x	奐	契	奒	奓	奔	奕	奖	套	奘	奙	奚	奛	奜	奝	奞	奟
U+596x	奠	奡	奢	奣	奤	奥	奦	奧	奨	奩	奪	奫	奬	奭	奮	奯
U+597x	奰	奱	奲	女	奴	奵	奶	奷	奸	她	奺	奻	奼	好	奾	奿
U+598x	妀	妁	如	妃	妄	妅	妆	妇	妈	妉	妊	妋	妌	妍	妎	妏
U+599x	妐	妑	妒	妓	妔	妕	妖	妗	妘	妙	妚	妛	妜	妝	妞	妟
U+59Ax	妠	妡	妢	妣	妤	妥	妦	妧	妨	妩	妪	妫	妬	妭	妮	妯
U+59Bx	妰	妱	妲	妳	妴	妵	妶	妷	妸	妹	妺	妻	妼	妽	妾	妿
U+59Cx	姀	姁	姂	姃	姄	姅	姆	姇	姈	姉	姊	始	姌	姍	姎	姏
U+59Dx	姐	姑	姒	姓	委	姕	姖	姗	姘	姙	姚	姛	姜	姝	姞	姟
U+59Ex	姠	姡	姢	姣	姤	姥	姦	姧	姨	姩	姪	姫	姬	姭	姮	姯
U+59Fx	姰	姱	姲	姳	姴	姵	姶	姷	姸	姹	姺	姻	姼	姽	姾	姿
U+5A0x	娀	威	娂	娃	娄	娅	娆	娇	娈	娉	娊	娋	娌	娍	娎	娏
U+5A1x	娐	娑	娒	娓	娔	娕	娖	娗	娘	娙	娚	娛	娜	娝	娞	娟
U+5A2x	娠	娡	娢	娣	娤	娥	娦	娧	娨	娩	娪	娫	娬	娭	娮	娯
U+5A3x	娰	娱	娲	娳	娴	娵	娶	娷	娸	娹	娺	娻	娼	娽	娾	娿
U+5A4x	婀	婁	婂	婃	婄	婅	婆	婇	婈	婉	婊	婋	婌	婍	婎	婏
U+5A5x	婐	婑	婒	婓	婔	婕	婖	婗	婘	婙	婚	婛	婜	婝	婞	婟
U+5A6x	婠	婡	婢	婣	婤	婥	婦	婧	婨	婩	婪	婫	婬	婭	婮	婯
U+5A7x	婰	婱	婲	婳	婴	婵	婶	婷	婸	婹	婺	婻	婼	婽	婾	婿
U+5A8x	媀	媁	媂	媃	媄	媅	媆	媇	媈	媉	媊	媋	媌	媍	媎	媏
U+5A9x	媐	媑	媒	媓	媔	媕	媖	媗	媘	媙	媚	媛	媜	媝	媞	媟
U+5AAx	媠	媡	媢	媣	媤	媥	媦	媧	媨	媩	媪	媫	媬	媭	媮	媯
U+5ABx	媰	媱	媲	媳	媴	媵	媶	媷	媸	媹	媺	媻	媼	媽	媾	媿
U+5ACx	嫀	嫁	嫂	嫃	嫄	嫅	嫆	嫇	嫈	嫉	嫊	嫋	嫌	嫍	嫎	嫏
U+5ADx	嫐	嫑	嫒	嫓	嫔	嫕	嫖	嫗	嫘	嫙	嫚	嫛	嫜	嫝	嫞	嫟
U+5AEx	嫠	嫡	嫢	嫣	嫤	嫥	嫦	嫧	嫨	嫩	嫪	嫫	嫬	嫭	嫮	嫯
U+5AFx	嫰	嫱	嫲	嫳	嫴	嫵	嫶	嫷	嫸	嫹	嫺	嫻	嫼	嫽	嫾	嫿
U+5B0x	嬀	嬁	嬂	嬃	嬄	嬅	嬆	嬇	嬈	嬉	嬊	嬋	嬌	嬍	嬎	嬏
U+5B1x	嬐	嬑	嬒	嬓	嬔	嬕	嬖	嬗	嬘	嬙	嬚	嬛	嬜	嬝	嬞	嬟
U+5B2x	嬠	嬡	嬢	嬣	嬤	嬥	嬦	嬧	嬨	嬩	嬪	嬫	嬬	嬭	嬮	嬯
U+5B3x	嬰	嬱	嬲	嬳	嬴	嬵	嬶	嬷	嬸	嬹	嬺	嬻	嬼	嬽	嬾	嬿
U+5B4x	孀	孁	孂	孃	孄	孅	孆	孇	孈	孉	孊	孋	孌	孍	孎	孏
U+5B5x	子	孑	孒	孓	孔	孕	孖	字	存	孙	孚	孛	孜	孝	孞	孟
U+5B6x	孠	孡	孢	季	孤	孥	学	孧	孨	孩	孪	孫	孬	孭	孮	孯
U+5B7x	孰	孱	孲	孳	孴	孵	孶	孷	學	孹	孺	孻	孼	孽	孾	孿
U+5B8x	宀	宁	宂	它	宄	宅	宆	宇	守	安	宊	宋	完	宍	宎	宏
U+5B9x	宐	宑	宒	宓	宔	宕	宖	宗	官	宙	定	宛	宜	宝	实	実
U+5BAx	宠	审	客	宣	室	宥	宦	宧	宨	宩	宪	宫	宬	宭	宮	宯
U+5BBx	宰	宱	宲	害	宴	宵	家	宷	宸	容	宺	宻	宼	宽	宾	宿
U+5BCx	寀	寁	寂	寃	寄	寅	密	寇	寈	寉	寊	寋	富	寍	寎	寏
U+5BDx	寐	寑	寒	寓	寔	寕	寖	寗	寘	寙	寚	寛	寜	寝	寞	察
U+5BEx	寠	寡	寢	寣	寤	寥	實	寧	寨	審	寪	寫	寬	寭	寮	寯
U+5BFx	寰	寱	寲	寳	寴	寵	寶	寷	寸	对	寺	寻	导	寽	対	寿
U+5C0x	尀	封	専	尃	射	尅	将	將	專	尉	尊	尋	尌	對	導	小
U+5C1x	尐	少	尒	尓	尔	尕	尖	尗	尘	尙	尚	尛	尜	尝	尞	尟
U+5C2x	尠	尡	尢	尣	尤	尥	尦	尧	尨	尩	尪	尫	尬	尭	尮	尯
U+5C3x	尰	就	尲	尳	尴	尵	尶	尷	尸	尹	尺	尻	尼	尽	尾	尿
U+5C4x	局	屁	层	屃	屄	居	屆	屇	屈	屉	届	屋	屌	屍	屎	屏
U+5C5x	屐	屑	屒	屓	屔	展	屖	屗	屘	屙	屚	屛	屜	屝	属	屟
U+5C6x	屠	屡	屢	屣	層	履	屦	屧	屨	屩	屪	屫	屬	屭	屮	屯
U+5C7x	屰	山	屲	屳	屴	屵	屶	屷	屸	屹	屺	屻	屼	屽	屾	屿
U+5C8x	岀	岁	岂	岃	岄	岅	岆	岇	岈	岉	岊	岋	岌	岍	岎	岏
U+5C9x	岐	岑	岒	岓	岔	岕	岖	岗	岘	岙	岚	岛	岜	岝	岞	岟
U+5CAx	岠	岡	岢	岣	岤	岥	岦	岧	岨	岩	岪	岫	岬	岭	岮	岯
U+5CBx	岰	岱	岲	岳	岴	岵	岶	岷	岸	岹	岺	岻	岼	岽	岾	岿
U+5CCx	峀	峁	峂	峃	峄	峅	峆	峇	峈	峉	峊	峋	峌	峍	峎	峏
U+5CDx	峐	峑	峒	峓	峔	峕	峖	峗	峘	峙	峚	峛	峜	峝	峞	峟
U+5CEx	峠	峡	峢	峣	峤	峥	峦	峧	峨	峩	峪	峫	峬	峭	峮	峯
U+5CFx	峰	峱	峲	峳	峴	峵	島	峷	峸	峹	峺	峻	峼	峽	峾	峿
U+5D0x	崀	崁	崂	崃	崄	崅	崆	崇	崈	崉	崊	崋	崌	崍	崎	崏
U+5D1x	崐	崑	崒	崓	崔	崕	崖	崗	崘	崙	崚	崛	崜	崝	崞	崟
U+5D2x	崠	崡	崢	崣	崤	崥	崦	崧	崨	崩	崪	崫	崬	崭	崮	崯
U+5D3x	崰	崱	崲	崳	崴	崵	崶	崷	崸	崹	崺	崻	崼	崽	崾	崿
U+5D4x	嵀	嵁	嵂	嵃	嵄	嵅	嵆	嵇	嵈	嵉	嵊	嵋	嵌	嵍	嵎	嵏
U+5D5x	嵐	嵑	嵒	嵓	嵔	嵕	嵖	嵗	嵘	嵙	嵚	嵛	嵜	嵝	嵞	嵟
U+5D6x	嵠	嵡	嵢	嵣	嵤	嵥	嵦	嵧	嵨	嵩	嵪	嵫	嵬	嵭	嵮	嵯
U+5D7x	嵰	嵱	嵲	嵳	嵴	嵵	嵶	嵷	嵸	嵹	嵺	嵻	嵼	嵽	嵾	嵿
U+5D8x	嶀	嶁	嶂	嶃	嶄	嶅	嶆	嶇	嶈	嶉	嶊	嶋	嶌	嶍	嶎	嶏
U+5D9x	嶐	嶑	嶒	嶓	嶔	嶕	嶖	嶗	嶘	嶙	嶚	嶛	嶜	嶝	嶞	嶟
U+5DAx	嶠	嶡	嶢	嶣	嶤	嶥	嶦	嶧	嶨	嶩	嶪	嶫	嶬	嶭	嶮	嶯
U+5DBx	嶰	嶱	嶲	嶳	嶴	嶵	嶶	嶷	嶸	嶹	嶺	嶻	嶼	嶽	嶾	嶿
U+5DCx	巀	巁	巂	巃	巄	巅	巆	巇	巈	巉	巊	巋	巌	巍	巎	巏
U+5DDx	巐	巑	巒	巓	巔	巕	巖	巗	巘	巙	巚	巛	巜	川	州	巟
U+5DEx	巠	巡	巢	巣	巤	工	左	巧	巨	巩	巪	巫	巬	巭	差	巯
U+5DFx	巰	己	已	巳	巴	巵	巶	巷	巸	巹	巺	巻	巼	巽	巾	巿
U+5E0x	帀	币	市	布	帄	帅	帆	帇	师	帉	帊	帋	希	帍	帎	帏
U+5E1x	帐	帑	帒	帓	帔	帕	帖	帗	帘	帙	帚	帛	帜	帝	帞	帟
U+5E2x	帠	帡	帢	帣	帤	帥	带	帧	帨	帩	帪	師	帬	席	帮	帯
U+5E3x	帰	帱	帲	帳	帴	帵	帶	帷	常	帹	帺	帻	帼	帽	帾	帿
U+5E4x	幀	幁	幂	幃	幄	幅	幆	幇	幈	幉	幊	幋	幌	幍	幎	幏
U+5E5x	幐	幑	幒	幓	幔	幕	幖	幗	幘	幙	幚	幛	幜	幝	幞	幟
U+5E6x	幠	幡	幢	幣	幤	幥	幦	幧	幨	幩	幪	幫	幬	幭	幮	幯
U+5E7x	幰	幱	干	平	年	幵	并	幷	幸	幹	幺	幻	幼	幽	幾	广
U+5E8x	庀	庁	庂	広	庄	庅	庆	庇	庈	庉	床	庋	庌	庍	庎	序
U+5E9x	庐	庑	庒	库	应	底	庖	店	庘	庙	庚	庛	府	庝	庞	废
U+5EAx	庠	庡	庢	庣	庤	庥	度	座	庨	庩	庪	庫	庬	庭	庮	庯
U+5EBx	庰	庱	庲	庳	庴	庵	庶	康	庸	庹	庺	庻	庼	庽	庾	庿
U+5ECx	廀	廁	廂	廃	廄	廅	廆	廇	廈	廉	廊	廋	廌	廍	廎	廏
U+5EDx	廐	廑	廒	廓	廔	廕	廖	廗	廘	廙	廚	廛	廜	廝	廞	廟
U+5EEx	廠	廡	廢	廣	廤	廥	廦	廧	廨	廩	廪	廫	廬	廭	廮	廯
U+5EFx	廰	廱	廲	廳	廴	廵	延	廷	廸	廹	建	廻	廼	廽	廾	廿
U+5F0x	开	弁	异	弃	弄	弅	弆	弇	弈	弉	弊	弋	弌	弍	弎	式
U+5F1x	弐	弑	弒	弓	弔	引	弖	弗	弘	弙	弚	弛	弜	弝	弞	弟
U+5F2x	张	弡	弢	弣	弤	弥	弦	弧	弨	弩	弪	弫	弬	弭	弮	弯
U+5F3x	弰	弱	弲	弳	弴	張	弶	強	弸	弹	强	弻	弼	弽	弾	弿
U+5F4x	彀	彁	彂	彃	彄	彅	彆	彇	彈	彉	彊	彋	彌	彍	彎	彏
U+5F5x	彐	彑	归	当	彔	录	彖	彗	彘	彙	彚	彛	彜	彝	彞	彟
U+5F6x	彠	彡	形	彣	彤	彥	彦	彧	彨	彩	彪	彫	彬	彭	彮	彯
U+5F7x	彰	影	彲	彳	彴	彵	彶	彷	彸	役	彺	彻	彼	彽	彾	彿
U+5F8x	往	征	徂	徃	径	待	徆	徇	很	徉	徊	律	後	徍	徎	徏
U+5F9x	徐	徑	徒	従	徔	徕	徖	得	徘	徙	徚	徛	徜	徝	從	徟
U+5FAx	徠	御	徢	徣	徤	徥	徦	徧	徨	復	循	徫	徬	徭	微	徯
U+5FBx	徰	徱	徲	徳	徴	徵	徶	德	徸	徹	徺	徻	徼	徽	徾	徿
U+5FCx	忀	忁	忂	心	忄	必	忆	忇	忈	忉	忊	忋	忌	忍	忎	忏
U+5FDx	忐	忑	忒	忓	忔	忕	忖	志	忘	忙	忚	忛	応	忝	忞	忟
U+5FEx	忠	忡	忢	忣	忤	忥	忦	忧	忨	忩	忪	快	忬	忭	忮	忯
U+5FFx	忰	忱	忲	忳	忴	念	忶	忷	忸	忹	忺	忻	忼	忽	忾	忿
U+600x	怀	态	怂	怃	怄	怅	怆	怇	怈	怉	怊	怋	怌	怍	怎	怏
U+601x	怐	怑	怒	怓	怔	怕	怖	怗	怘	怙	怚	怛	怜	思	怞	怟
U+602x	怠	怡	怢	怣	怤	急	怦	性	怨	怩	怪	怫	怬	怭	怮	怯
U+603x	怰	怱	怲	怳	怴	怵	怶	怷	怸	怹	怺	总	怼	怽	怾	怿
U+604x	恀	恁	恂	恃	恄	恅	恆	恇	恈	恉	恊	恋	恌	恍	恎	恏
U+605x	恐	恑	恒	恓	恔	恕	恖	恗	恘	恙	恚	恛	恜	恝	恞	恟
U+606x	恠	恡	恢	恣	恤	恥	恦	恧	恨	恩	恪	恫	恬	恭	恮	息
U+607x	恰	恱	恲	恳	恴	恵	恶	恷	恸	恹	恺	恻	恼	恽	恾	恿
U+608x	悀	悁	悂	悃	悄	悅	悆	悇	悈	悉	悊	悋	悌	悍	悎	悏
U+609x	悐	悑	悒	悓	悔	悕	悖	悗	悘	悙	悚	悛	悜	悝	悞	悟
U+60Ax	悠	悡	悢	患	悤	悥	悦	悧	您	悩	悪	悫	悬	悭	悮	悯
U+60Bx	悰	悱	悲	悳	悴	悵	悶	悷	悸	悹	悺	悻	悼	悽	悾	悿
U+60Cx	惀	惁	惂	惃	惄	情	惆	惇	惈	惉	惊	惋	惌	惍	惎	惏
U+60Dx	惐	惑	惒	惓	惔	惕	惖	惗	惘	惙	惚	惛	惜	惝	惞	惟
U+60Ex	惠	惡	惢	惣	惤	惥	惦	惧	惨	惩	惪	惫	惬	惭	惮	惯
U+60Fx	惰	惱	惲	想	惴	惵	惶	惷	惸	惹	惺	惻	惼	惽	惾	惿
U+610x	愀	愁	愂	愃	愄	愅	愆	愇	愈	愉	愊	愋	愌	愍	愎	意
U+611x	愐	愑	愒	愓	愔	愕	愖	愗	愘	愙	愚	愛	愜	愝	愞	感
U+612x	愠	愡	愢	愣	愤	愥	愦	愧	愨	愩	愪	愫	愬	愭	愮	愯
U+613x	愰	愱	愲	愳	愴	愵	愶	愷	愸	愹	愺	愻	愼	愽	愾	愿
U+614x	慀	慁	慂	慃	慄	慅	慆	慇	慈	慉	慊	態	慌	慍	慎	慏
U+615x	慐	慑	慒	慓	慔	慕	慖	慗	慘	慙	慚	慛	慜	慝	慞	慟
U+616x	慠	慡	慢	慣	慤	慥	慦	慧	慨	慩	慪	慫	慬	慭	慮	慯
U+617x	慰	慱	慲	慳	慴	慵	慶	慷	慸	慹	慺	慻	慼	慽	慾	慿
U+618x	憀	憁	憂	憃	憄	憅	憆	憇	憈	憉	憊	憋	憌	憍	憎	憏
U+619x	憐	憑	憒	憓	憔	憕	憖	憗	憘	憙	憚	憛	憜	憝	憞	憟
U+61Ax	憠	憡	憢	憣	憤	憥	憦	憧	憨	憩	憪	憫	憬	憭	憮	憯
U+61Bx	憰	憱	憲	憳	憴	憵	憶	憷	憸	憹	憺	憻	憼	憽	憾	憿
U+61Cx	懀	懁	懂	懃	懄	懅	懆	懇	懈	應	懊	懋	懌	懍	懎	懏
U+61Dx	懐	懑	懒	懓	懔	懕	懖	懗	懘	懙	懚	懛	懜	懝	懞	懟
U+61Ex	懠	懡	懢	懣	懤	懥	懦	懧	懨	懩	懪	懫	懬	懭	懮	懯
U+61Fx	懰	懱	懲	懳	懴	懵	懶	懷	懸	懹	懺	懻	懼	懽	懾	懿
U+620x	戀	戁	戂	戃	戄	戅	戆	戇	戈	戉	戊	戋	戌	戍	戎	戏
U+621x	成	我	戒	戓	戔	戕	或	戗	战	戙	戚	戛	戜	戝	戞	戟
U+622x	戠	戡	戢	戣	戤	戥	戦	戧	戨	戩	截	戫	戬	戭	戮	戯
U+623x	戰	戱	戲	戳	戴	戵	戶	户	戸	戹	戺	戻	戼	戽	戾	房
U+624x	所	扁	扂	扃	扄	扅	扆	扇	扈	扉	扊	手	扌	才	扎	扏
U+625x	扐	扑	扒	打	扔	払	扖	扗	托	扙	扚	扛	扜	扝	扞	扟
U+626x	扠	扡	扢	扣	扤	扥	扦	执	扨	扩	扪	扫	扬	扭	扮	扯
U+627x	扰	扱	扲	扳	扴	扵	扶	扷	扸	批	扺	扻	扼	扽	找	承
U+628x	技	抁	抂	抃	抄	抅	抆	抇	抈	抉	把	抋	抌	抍	抎	抏
U+629x	抐	抑	抒	抓	抔	投	抖	抗	折	抙	抚	抛	抜	抝	択	抟
U+62Ax	抠	抡	抢	抣	护	报	抦	抧	抨	抩	抪	披	抬	抭	抮	抯
U+62Bx	抰	抱	抲	抳	抴	抵	抶	抷	抸	抹	抺	抻	押	抽	抾	抿
U+62Cx	拀	拁	拂	拃	拄	担	拆	拇	拈	拉	拊	拋	拌	拍	拎	拏
U+62Dx	拐	拑	拒	拓	拔	拕	拖	拗	拘	拙	拚	招	拜	拝	拞	拟
U+62Ex	拠	拡	拢	拣	拤	拥	拦	拧	拨	择	拪	拫	括	拭	拮	拯
U+62Fx	拰	拱	拲	拳	拴	拵	拶	拷	拸	拹	拺	拻	拼	拽	拾	拿
Notes 1.As of Unicode version 18.0
