= List of CJK Unified Ideographs, part 2 of 4 =

CJK Unified Ideographs (Part 2 of 4)^{[1]} Official Unicode Consortium code chart (PDF)
	0	1	2	3	4	5	6	7	8	9	A	B	C	D	E	F
U+630x	挀	持	挂	挃	挄	挅	挆	指	挈	按	挊	挋	挌	挍	挎	挏
U+631x	挐	挑	挒	挓	挔	挕	挖	挗	挘	挙	挚	挛	挜	挝	挞	挟
U+632x	挠	挡	挢	挣	挤	挥	挦	挧	挨	挩	挪	挫	挬	挭	挮	振
U+633x	挰	挱	挲	挳	挴	挵	挶	挷	挸	挹	挺	挻	挼	挽	挾	挿
U+634x	捀	捁	捂	捃	捄	捅	捆	捇	捈	捉	捊	捋	捌	捍	捎	捏
U+635x	捐	捑	捒	捓	捔	捕	捖	捗	捘	捙	捚	捛	捜	捝	捞	损
U+636x	捠	捡	换	捣	捤	捥	捦	捧	捨	捩	捪	捫	捬	捭	据	捯
U+637x	捰	捱	捲	捳	捴	捵	捶	捷	捸	捹	捺	捻	捼	捽	捾	捿
U+638x	掀	掁	掂	掃	掄	掅	掆	掇	授	掉	掊	掋	掌	掍	掎	掏
U+639x	掐	掑	排	掓	掔	掕	掖	掗	掘	掙	掚	掛	掜	掝	掞	掟
U+63Ax	掠	採	探	掣	掤	接	掦	控	推	掩	措	掫	掬	掭	掮	掯
U+63Bx	掰	掱	掲	掳	掴	掵	掶	掷	掸	掹	掺	掻	掼	掽	掾	掿
U+63Cx	揀	揁	揂	揃	揄	揅	揆	揇	揈	揉	揊	揋	揌	揍	揎	描
U+63Dx	提	揑	插	揓	揔	揕	揖	揗	揘	揙	揚	換	揜	揝	揞	揟
U+63Ex	揠	握	揢	揣	揤	揥	揦	揧	揨	揩	揪	揫	揬	揭	揮	揯
U+63Fx	揰	揱	揲	揳	援	揵	揶	揷	揸	揹	揺	揻	揼	揽	揾	揿
U+640x	搀	搁	搂	搃	搄	搅	搆	搇	搈	搉	搊	搋	搌	損	搎	搏
U+641x	搐	搑	搒	搓	搔	搕	搖	搗	搘	搙	搚	搛	搜	搝	搞	搟
U+642x	搠	搡	搢	搣	搤	搥	搦	搧	搨	搩	搪	搫	搬	搭	搮	搯
U+643x	搰	搱	搲	搳	搴	搵	搶	搷	搸	搹	携	搻	搼	搽	搾	搿
U+644x	摀	摁	摂	摃	摄	摅	摆	摇	摈	摉	摊	摋	摌	摍	摎	摏
U+645x	摐	摑	摒	摓	摔	摕	摖	摗	摘	摙	摚	摛	摜	摝	摞	摟
U+646x	摠	摡	摢	摣	摤	摥	摦	摧	摨	摩	摪	摫	摬	摭	摮	摯
U+647x	摰	摱	摲	摳	摴	摵	摶	摷	摸	摹	摺	摻	摼	摽	摾	摿
U+648x	撀	撁	撂	撃	撄	撅	撆	撇	撈	撉	撊	撋	撌	撍	撎	撏
U+649x	撐	撑	撒	撓	撔	撕	撖	撗	撘	撙	撚	撛	撜	撝	撞	撟
U+64Ax	撠	撡	撢	撣	撤	撥	撦	撧	撨	撩	撪	撫	撬	播	撮	撯
U+64Bx	撰	撱	撲	撳	撴	撵	撶	撷	撸	撹	撺	撻	撼	撽	撾	撿
U+64Cx	擀	擁	擂	擃	擄	擅	擆	擇	擈	擉	擊	擋	擌	操	擎	擏
U+64Dx	擐	擑	擒	擓	擔	擕	擖	擗	擘	擙	據	擛	擜	擝	擞	擟
U+64Ex	擠	擡	擢	擣	擤	擥	擦	擧	擨	擩	擪	擫	擬	擭	擮	擯
U+64Fx	擰	擱	擲	擳	擴	擵	擶	擷	擸	擹	擺	擻	擼	擽	擾	擿
U+650x	攀	攁	攂	攃	攄	攅	攆	攇	攈	攉	攊	攋	攌	攍	攎	攏
U+651x	攐	攑	攒	攓	攔	攕	攖	攗	攘	攙	攚	攛	攜	攝	攞	攟
U+652x	攠	攡	攢	攣	攤	攥	攦	攧	攨	攩	攪	攫	攬	攭	攮	支
U+653x	攰	攱	攲	攳	攴	攵	收	攷	攸	改	攺	攻	攼	攽	放	政
U+654x	敀	敁	敂	敃	敄	故	敆	敇	效	敉	敊	敋	敌	敍	敎	敏
U+655x	敐	救	敒	敓	敔	敕	敖	敗	敘	教	敚	敛	敜	敝	敞	敟
U+656x	敠	敡	敢	散	敤	敥	敦	敧	敨	敩	敪	敫	敬	敭	敮	敯
U+657x	数	敱	敲	敳	整	敵	敶	敷	數	敹	敺	敻	敼	敽	敾	敿
U+658x	斀	斁	斂	斃	斄	斅	斆	文	斈	斉	斊	斋	斌	斍	斎	斏
U+659x	斐	斑	斒	斓	斔	斕	斖	斗	斘	料	斚	斛	斜	斝	斞	斟
U+65Ax	斠	斡	斢	斣	斤	斥	斦	斧	斨	斩	斪	斫	斬	断	斮	斯
U+65Bx	新	斱	斲	斳	斴	斵	斶	斷	斸	方	斺	斻	於	施	斾	斿
U+65Cx	旀	旁	旂	旃	旄	旅	旆	旇	旈	旉	旊	旋	旌	旍	旎	族
U+65Dx	旐	旑	旒	旓	旔	旕	旖	旗	旘	旙	旚	旛	旜	旝	旞	旟
U+65Ex	无	旡	既	旣	旤	日	旦	旧	旨	早	旪	旫	旬	旭	旮	旯
U+65Fx	旰	旱	旲	旳	旴	旵	时	旷	旸	旹	旺	旻	旼	旽	旾	旿
U+660x	昀	昁	昂	昃	昄	昅	昆	昇	昈	昉	昊	昋	昌	昍	明	昏
U+661x	昐	昑	昒	易	昔	昕	昖	昗	昘	昙	昚	昛	昜	昝	昞	星
U+662x	映	昡	昢	昣	昤	春	昦	昧	昨	昩	昪	昫	昬	昭	昮	是
U+663x	昰	昱	昲	昳	昴	昵	昶	昷	昸	昹	昺	昻	昼	昽	显	昿
U+664x	晀	晁	時	晃	晄	晅	晆	晇	晈	晉	晊	晋	晌	晍	晎	晏
U+665x	晐	晑	晒	晓	晔	晕	晖	晗	晘	晙	晚	晛	晜	晝	晞	晟
U+666x	晠	晡	晢	晣	晤	晥	晦	晧	晨	晩	晪	晫	晬	晭	普	景
U+667x	晰	晱	晲	晳	晴	晵	晶	晷	晸	晹	智	晻	晼	晽	晾	晿
U+668x	暀	暁	暂	暃	暄	暅	暆	暇	暈	暉	暊	暋	暌	暍	暎	暏
U+669x	暐	暑	暒	暓	暔	暕	暖	暗	暘	暙	暚	暛	暜	暝	暞	暟
U+66Ax	暠	暡	暢	暣	暤	暥	暦	暧	暨	暩	暪	暫	暬	暭	暮	暯
U+66Bx	暰	暱	暲	暳	暴	暵	暶	暷	暸	暹	暺	暻	暼	暽	暾	暿
U+66Cx	曀	曁	曂	曃	曄	曅	曆	曇	曈	曉	曊	曋	曌	曍	曎	曏
U+66Dx	曐	曑	曒	曓	曔	曕	曖	曗	曘	曙	曚	曛	曜	曝	曞	曟
U+66Ex	曠	曡	曢	曣	曤	曥	曦	曧	曨	曩	曪	曫	曬	曭	曮	曯
U+66Fx	曰	曱	曲	曳	更	曵	曶	曷	書	曹	曺	曻	曼	曽	曾	替
U+670x	最	朁	朂	會	朄	朅	朆	朇	月	有	朊	朋	朌	服	朎	朏
U+671x	朐	朑	朒	朓	朔	朕	朖	朗	朘	朙	朚	望	朜	朝	朞	期
U+672x	朠	朡	朢	朣	朤	朥	朦	朧	木	朩	未	末	本	札	朮	术
U+673x	朰	朱	朲	朳	朴	朵	朶	朷	朸	朹	机	朻	朼	朽	朾	朿
U+674x	杀	杁	杂	权	杄	杅	杆	杇	杈	杉	杊	杋	杌	杍	李	杏
U+675x	材	村	杒	杓	杔	杕	杖	杗	杘	杙	杚	杛	杜	杝	杞	束
U+676x	杠	条	杢	杣	杤	来	杦	杧	杨	杩	杪	杫	杬	杭	杮	杯
U+677x	杰	東	杲	杳	杴	杵	杶	杷	杸	杹	杺	杻	杼	杽	松	板
U+678x	枀	极	枂	枃	构	枅	枆	枇	枈	枉	枊	枋	枌	枍	枎	枏
U+679x	析	枑	枒	枓	枔	枕	枖	林	枘	枙	枚	枛	果	枝	枞	枟
U+67Ax	枠	枡	枢	枣	枤	枥	枦	枧	枨	枩	枪	枫	枬	枭	枮	枯
U+67Bx	枰	枱	枲	枳	枴	枵	架	枷	枸	枹	枺	枻	枼	枽	枾	枿
U+67Cx	柀	柁	柂	柃	柄	柅	柆	柇	柈	柉	柊	柋	柌	柍	柎	柏
U+67Dx	某	柑	柒	染	柔	柕	柖	柗	柘	柙	柚	柛	柜	柝	柞	柟
U+67Ex	柠	柡	柢	柣	柤	查	柦	柧	柨	柩	柪	柫	柬	柭	柮	柯
U+67Fx	柰	柱	柲	柳	柴	柵	柶	柷	柸	柹	柺	査	柼	柽	柾	柿
U+680x	栀	栁	栂	栃	栄	栅	栆	标	栈	栉	栊	栋	栌	栍	栎	栏
U+681x	栐	树	栒	栓	栔	栕	栖	栗	栘	栙	栚	栛	栜	栝	栞	栟
U+682x	栠	校	栢	栣	栤	栥	栦	栧	栨	栩	株	栫	栬	栭	栮	栯
U+683x	栰	栱	栲	栳	栴	栵	栶	样	核	根	栺	栻	格	栽	栾	栿
U+684x	桀	桁	桂	桃	桄	桅	框	桇	案	桉	桊	桋	桌	桍	桎	桏
U+685x	桐	桑	桒	桓	桔	桕	桖	桗	桘	桙	桚	桛	桜	桝	桞	桟
U+686x	桠	桡	桢	档	桤	桥	桦	桧	桨	桩	桪	桫	桬	桭	桮	桯
U+687x	桰	桱	桲	桳	桴	桵	桶	桷	桸	桹	桺	桻	桼	桽	桾	桿
U+688x	梀	梁	梂	梃	梄	梅	梆	梇	梈	梉	梊	梋	梌	梍	梎	梏
U+689x	梐	梑	梒	梓	梔	梕	梖	梗	梘	梙	梚	梛	梜	條	梞	梟
U+68Ax	梠	梡	梢	梣	梤	梥	梦	梧	梨	梩	梪	梫	梬	梭	梮	梯
U+68Bx	械	梱	梲	梳	梴	梵	梶	梷	梸	梹	梺	梻	梼	梽	梾	梿
U+68Cx	检	棁	棂	棃	棄	棅	棆	棇	棈	棉	棊	棋	棌	棍	棎	棏
U+68Dx	棐	棑	棒	棓	棔	棕	棖	棗	棘	棙	棚	棛	棜	棝	棞	棟
U+68Ex	棠	棡	棢	棣	棤	棥	棦	棧	棨	棩	棪	棫	棬	棭	森	棯
U+68Fx	棰	棱	棲	棳	棴	棵	棶	棷	棸	棹	棺	棻	棼	棽	棾	棿
U+690x	椀	椁	椂	椃	椄	椅	椆	椇	椈	椉	椊	椋	椌	植	椎	椏
U+691x	椐	椑	椒	椓	椔	椕	椖	椗	椘	椙	椚	椛	検	椝	椞	椟
U+692x	椠	椡	椢	椣	椤	椥	椦	椧	椨	椩	椪	椫	椬	椭	椮	椯
U+693x	椰	椱	椲	椳	椴	椵	椶	椷	椸	椹	椺	椻	椼	椽	椾	椿
U+694x	楀	楁	楂	楃	楄	楅	楆	楇	楈	楉	楊	楋	楌	楍	楎	楏
U+695x	楐	楑	楒	楓	楔	楕	楖	楗	楘	楙	楚	楛	楜	楝	楞	楟
U+696x	楠	楡	楢	楣	楤	楥	楦	楧	楨	楩	楪	楫	楬	業	楮	楯
U+697x	楰	楱	楲	楳	楴	極	楶	楷	楸	楹	楺	楻	楼	楽	楾	楿
U+698x	榀	榁	概	榃	榄	榅	榆	榇	榈	榉	榊	榋	榌	榍	榎	榏
U+699x	榐	榑	榒	榓	榔	榕	榖	榗	榘	榙	榚	榛	榜	榝	榞	榟
U+69Ax	榠	榡	榢	榣	榤	榥	榦	榧	榨	榩	榪	榫	榬	榭	榮	榯
U+69Bx	榰	榱	榲	榳	榴	榵	榶	榷	榸	榹	榺	榻	榼	榽	榾	榿
U+69Cx	槀	槁	槂	槃	槄	槅	槆	槇	槈	槉	槊	構	槌	槍	槎	槏
U+69Dx	槐	槑	槒	槓	槔	槕	槖	槗	様	槙	槚	槛	槜	槝	槞	槟
U+69Ex	槠	槡	槢	槣	槤	槥	槦	槧	槨	槩	槪	槫	槬	槭	槮	槯
U+69Fx	槰	槱	槲	槳	槴	槵	槶	槷	槸	槹	槺	槻	槼	槽	槾	槿
U+6A0x	樀	樁	樂	樃	樄	樅	樆	樇	樈	樉	樊	樋	樌	樍	樎	樏
U+6A1x	樐	樑	樒	樓	樔	樕	樖	樗	樘	標	樚	樛	樜	樝	樞	樟
U+6A2x	樠	模	樢	樣	樤	樥	樦	樧	樨	権	横	樫	樬	樭	樮	樯
U+6A3x	樰	樱	樲	樳	樴	樵	樶	樷	樸	樹	樺	樻	樼	樽	樾	樿
U+6A4x	橀	橁	橂	橃	橄	橅	橆	橇	橈	橉	橊	橋	橌	橍	橎	橏
U+6A5x	橐	橑	橒	橓	橔	橕	橖	橗	橘	橙	橚	橛	橜	橝	橞	機
U+6A6x	橠	橡	橢	橣	橤	橥	橦	橧	橨	橩	橪	橫	橬	橭	橮	橯
U+6A7x	橰	橱	橲	橳	橴	橵	橶	橷	橸	橹	橺	橻	橼	橽	橾	橿
U+6A8x	檀	檁	檂	檃	檄	檅	檆	檇	檈	檉	檊	檋	檌	檍	檎	檏
U+6A9x	檐	檑	檒	檓	檔	檕	檖	檗	檘	檙	檚	檛	檜	檝	檞	檟
U+6AAx	檠	檡	檢	檣	檤	檥	檦	檧	檨	檩	檪	檫	檬	檭	檮	檯
U+6ABx	檰	檱	檲	檳	檴	檵	檶	檷	檸	檹	檺	檻	檼	檽	檾	檿
U+6ACx	櫀	櫁	櫂	櫃	櫄	櫅	櫆	櫇	櫈	櫉	櫊	櫋	櫌	櫍	櫎	櫏
U+6ADx	櫐	櫑	櫒	櫓	櫔	櫕	櫖	櫗	櫘	櫙	櫚	櫛	櫜	櫝	櫞	櫟
U+6AEx	櫠	櫡	櫢	櫣	櫤	櫥	櫦	櫧	櫨	櫩	櫪	櫫	櫬	櫭	櫮	櫯
U+6AFx	櫰	櫱	櫲	櫳	櫴	櫵	櫶	櫷	櫸	櫹	櫺	櫻	櫼	櫽	櫾	櫿
U+6B0x	欀	欁	欂	欃	欄	欅	欆	欇	欈	欉	權	欋	欌	欍	欎	欏
U+6B1x	欐	欑	欒	欓	欔	欕	欖	欗	欘	欙	欚	欛	欜	欝	欞	欟
U+6B2x	欠	次	欢	欣	欤	欥	欦	欧	欨	欩	欪	欫	欬	欭	欮	欯
U+6B3x	欰	欱	欲	欳	欴	欵	欶	欷	欸	欹	欺	欻	欼	欽	款	欿
U+6B4x	歀	歁	歂	歃	歄	歅	歆	歇	歈	歉	歊	歋	歌	歍	歎	歏
U+6B5x	歐	歑	歒	歓	歔	歕	歖	歗	歘	歙	歚	歛	歜	歝	歞	歟
U+6B6x	歠	歡	止	正	此	步	武	歧	歨	歩	歪	歫	歬	歭	歮	歯
U+6B7x	歰	歱	歲	歳	歴	歵	歶	歷	歸	歹	歺	死	歼	歽	歾	歿
U+6B8x	殀	殁	殂	殃	殄	殅	殆	殇	殈	殉	殊	残	殌	殍	殎	殏
U+6B9x	殐	殑	殒	殓	殔	殕	殖	殗	殘	殙	殚	殛	殜	殝	殞	殟
U+6BAx	殠	殡	殢	殣	殤	殥	殦	殧	殨	殩	殪	殫	殬	殭	殮	殯
U+6BBx	殰	殱	殲	殳	殴	段	殶	殷	殸	殹	殺	殻	殼	殽	殾	殿
U+6BCx	毀	毁	毂	毃	毄	毅	毆	毇	毈	毉	毊	毋	毌	母	毎	每
U+6BDx	毐	毑	毒	毓	比	毕	毖	毗	毘	毙	毚	毛	毜	毝	毞	毟
U+6BEx	毠	毡	毢	毣	毤	毥	毦	毧	毨	毩	毪	毫	毬	毭	毮	毯
U+6BFx	毰	毱	毲	毳	毴	毵	毶	毷	毸	毹	毺	毻	毼	毽	毾	毿
U+6C0x	氀	氁	氂	氃	氄	氅	氆	氇	氈	氉	氊	氋	氌	氍	氎	氏
U+6C1x	氐	民	氒	氓	气	氕	氖	気	氘	氙	氚	氛	氜	氝	氞	氟
U+6C2x	氠	氡	氢	氣	氤	氥	氦	氧	氨	氩	氪	氫	氬	氭	氮	氯
U+6C3x	氰	氱	氲	氳	水	氵	氶	氷	永	氹	氺	氻	氼	氽	氾	氿
U+6C4x	汀	汁	求	汃	汄	汅	汆	汇	汈	汉	汊	汋	汌	汍	汎	汏
U+6C5x	汐	汑	汒	汓	汔	汕	汖	汗	汘	汙	汚	汛	汜	汝	汞	江
U+6C6x	池	污	汢	汣	汤	汥	汦	汧	汨	汩	汪	汫	汬	汭	汮	汯
U+6C7x	汰	汱	汲	汳	汴	汵	汶	汷	汸	汹	決	汻	汼	汽	汾	汿
U+6C8x	沀	沁	沂	沃	沄	沅	沆	沇	沈	沉	沊	沋	沌	沍	沎	沏
U+6C9x	沐	沑	沒	沓	沔	沕	沖	沗	沘	沙	沚	沛	沜	沝	沞	沟
U+6CAx	沠	没	沢	沣	沤	沥	沦	沧	沨	沩	沪	沫	沬	沭	沮	沯
U+6CBx	沰	沱	沲	河	沴	沵	沶	沷	沸	油	沺	治	沼	沽	沾	沿
U+6CCx	泀	況	泂	泃	泄	泅	泆	泇	泈	泉	泊	泋	泌	泍	泎	泏
U+6CDx	泐	泑	泒	泓	泔	法	泖	泗	泘	泙	泚	泛	泜	泝	泞	泟
U+6CEx	泠	泡	波	泣	泤	泥	泦	泧	注	泩	泪	泫	泬	泭	泮	泯
U+6CFx	泰	泱	泲	泳	泴	泵	泶	泷	泸	泹	泺	泻	泼	泽	泾	泿
U+6D0x	洀	洁	洂	洃	洄	洅	洆	洇	洈	洉	洊	洋	洌	洍	洎	洏
U+6D1x	洐	洑	洒	洓	洔	洕	洖	洗	洘	洙	洚	洛	洜	洝	洞	洟
U+6D2x	洠	洡	洢	洣	洤	津	洦	洧	洨	洩	洪	洫	洬	洭	洮	洯
U+6D3x	洰	洱	洲	洳	洴	洵	洶	洷	洸	洹	洺	活	洼	洽	派	洿
U+6D4x	浀	流	浂	浃	浄	浅	浆	浇	浈	浉	浊	测	浌	浍	济	浏
U+6D5x	浐	浑	浒	浓	浔	浕	浖	浗	浘	浙	浚	浛	浜	浝	浞	浟
U+6D6x	浠	浡	浢	浣	浤	浥	浦	浧	浨	浩	浪	浫	浬	浭	浮	浯
U+6D7x	浰	浱	浲	浳	浴	浵	浶	海	浸	浹	浺	浻	浼	浽	浾	浿
U+6D8x	涀	涁	涂	涃	涄	涅	涆	涇	消	涉	涊	涋	涌	涍	涎	涏
U+6D9x	涐	涑	涒	涓	涔	涕	涖	涗	涘	涙	涚	涛	涜	涝	涞	涟
U+6DAx	涠	涡	涢	涣	涤	涥	润	涧	涨	涩	涪	涫	涬	涭	涮	涯
U+6DBx	涰	涱	液	涳	涴	涵	涶	涷	涸	涹	涺	涻	涼	涽	涾	涿
U+6DCx	淀	淁	淂	淃	淄	淅	淆	淇	淈	淉	淊	淋	淌	淍	淎	淏
U+6DDx	淐	淑	淒	淓	淔	淕	淖	淗	淘	淙	淚	淛	淜	淝	淞	淟
U+6DEx	淠	淡	淢	淣	淤	淥	淦	淧	淨	淩	淪	淫	淬	淭	淮	淯
U+6DFx	淰	深	淲	淳	淴	淵	淶	混	淸	淹	淺	添	淼	淽	淾	淿
U+6E0x	渀	渁	渂	渃	渄	清	渆	渇	済	渉	渊	渋	渌	渍	渎	渏
U+6E1x	渐	渑	渒	渓	渔	渕	渖	渗	渘	渙	渚	減	渜	渝	渞	渟
U+6E2x	渠	渡	渢	渣	渤	渥	渦	渧	渨	温	渪	渫	測	渭	渮	港
U+6E3x	渰	渱	渲	渳	渴	渵	渶	渷	游	渹	渺	渻	渼	渽	渾	渿
U+6E4x	湀	湁	湂	湃	湄	湅	湆	湇	湈	湉	湊	湋	湌	湍	湎	湏
U+6E5x	湐	湑	湒	湓	湔	湕	湖	湗	湘	湙	湚	湛	湜	湝	湞	湟
U+6E6x	湠	湡	湢	湣	湤	湥	湦	湧	湨	湩	湪	湫	湬	湭	湮	湯
U+6E7x	湰	湱	湲	湳	湴	湵	湶	湷	湸	湹	湺	湻	湼	湽	湾	湿
U+6E8x	満	溁	溂	溃	溄	溅	溆	溇	溈	溉	溊	溋	溌	溍	溎	溏
U+6E9x	源	溑	溒	溓	溔	溕	準	溗	溘	溙	溚	溛	溜	溝	溞	溟
U+6EAx	溠	溡	溢	溣	溤	溥	溦	溧	溨	溩	溪	溫	溬	溭	溮	溯
U+6EBx	溰	溱	溲	溳	溴	溵	溶	溷	溸	溹	溺	溻	溼	溽	溾	溿
U+6ECx	滀	滁	滂	滃	滄	滅	滆	滇	滈	滉	滊	滋	滌	滍	滎	滏
U+6EDx	滐	滑	滒	滓	滔	滕	滖	滗	滘	滙	滚	滛	滜	滝	滞	滟
U+6EEx	滠	满	滢	滣	滤	滥	滦	滧	滨	滩	滪	滫	滬	滭	滮	滯
U+6EFx	滰	滱	滲	滳	滴	滵	滶	滷	滸	滹	滺	滻	滼	滽	滾	滿
U+6F0x	漀	漁	漂	漃	漄	漅	漆	漇	漈	漉	漊	漋	漌	漍	漎	漏
U+6F1x	漐	漑	漒	漓	演	漕	漖	漗	漘	漙	漚	漛	漜	漝	漞	漟
U+6F2x	漠	漡	漢	漣	漤	漥	漦	漧	漨	漩	漪	漫	漬	漭	漮	漯
U+6F3x	漰	漱	漲	漳	漴	漵	漶	漷	漸	漹	漺	漻	漼	漽	漾	漿
U+6F4x	潀	潁	潂	潃	潄	潅	潆	潇	潈	潉	潊	潋	潌	潍	潎	潏
U+6F5x	潐	潑	潒	潓	潔	潕	潖	潗	潘	潙	潚	潛	潜	潝	潞	潟
U+6F6x	潠	潡	潢	潣	潤	潥	潦	潧	潨	潩	潪	潫	潬	潭	潮	潯
U+6F7x	潰	潱	潲	潳	潴	潵	潶	潷	潸	潹	潺	潻	潼	潽	潾	潿
U+6F8x	澀	澁	澂	澃	澄	澅	澆	澇	澈	澉	澊	澋	澌	澍	澎	澏
U+6F9x	澐	澑	澒	澓	澔	澕	澖	澗	澘	澙	澚	澛	澜	澝	澞	澟
U+6FAx	澠	澡	澢	澣	澤	澥	澦	澧	澨	澩	澪	澫	澬	澭	澮	澯
U+6FBx	澰	澱	澲	澳	澴	澵	澶	澷	澸	澹	澺	澻	澼	澽	澾	澿
U+6FCx	激	濁	濂	濃	濄	濅	濆	濇	濈	濉	濊	濋	濌	濍	濎	濏
U+6FDx	濐	濑	濒	濓	濔	濕	濖	濗	濘	濙	濚	濛	濜	濝	濞	濟
U+6FEx	濠	濡	濢	濣	濤	濥	濦	濧	濨	濩	濪	濫	濬	濭	濮	濯
U+6FFx	濰	濱	濲	濳	濴	濵	濶	濷	濸	濹	濺	濻	濼	濽	濾	濿
U+700x	瀀	瀁	瀂	瀃	瀄	瀅	瀆	瀇	瀈	瀉	瀊	瀋	瀌	瀍	瀎	瀏
U+701x	瀐	瀑	瀒	瀓	瀔	瀕	瀖	瀗	瀘	瀙	瀚	瀛	瀜	瀝	瀞	瀟
U+702x	瀠	瀡	瀢	瀣	瀤	瀥	瀦	瀧	瀨	瀩	瀪	瀫	瀬	瀭	瀮	瀯
U+703x	瀰	瀱	瀲	瀳	瀴	瀵	瀶	瀷	瀸	瀹	瀺	瀻	瀼	瀽	瀾	瀿
U+704x	灀	灁	灂	灃	灄	灅	灆	灇	灈	灉	灊	灋	灌	灍	灎	灏
U+705x	灐	灑	灒	灓	灔	灕	灖	灗	灘	灙	灚	灛	灜	灝	灞	灟
U+706x	灠	灡	灢	灣	灤	灥	灦	灧	灨	灩	灪	火	灬	灭	灮	灯
U+707x	灰	灱	灲	灳	灴	灵	灶	灷	灸	灹	灺	灻	灼	災	灾	灿
U+708x	炀	炁	炂	炃	炄	炅	炆	炇	炈	炉	炊	炋	炌	炍	炎	炏
U+709x	炐	炑	炒	炓	炔	炕	炖	炗	炘	炙	炚	炛	炜	炝	炞	炟
U+70Ax	炠	炡	炢	炣	炤	炥	炦	炧	炨	炩	炪	炫	炬	炭	炮	炯
U+70Bx	炰	炱	炲	炳	炴	炵	炶	炷	炸	点	為	炻	炼	炽	炾	炿
U+70Cx	烀	烁	烂	烃	烄	烅	烆	烇	烈	烉	烊	烋	烌	烍	烎	烏
U+70Dx	烐	烑	烒	烓	烔	烕	烖	烗	烘	烙	烚	烛	烜	烝	烞	烟
U+70Ex	烠	烡	烢	烣	烤	烥	烦	烧	烨	烩	烪	烫	烬	热	烮	烯
U+70Fx	烰	烱	烲	烳	烴	烵	烶	烷	烸	烹	烺	烻	烼	烽	烾	烿
U+710x	焀	焁	焂	焃	焄	焅	焆	焇	焈	焉	焊	焋	焌	焍	焎	焏
U+711x	焐	焑	焒	焓	焔	焕	焖	焗	焘	焙	焚	焛	焜	焝	焞	焟
U+712x	焠	無	焢	焣	焤	焥	焦	焧	焨	焩	焪	焫	焬	焭	焮	焯
U+713x	焰	焱	焲	焳	焴	焵	然	焷	焸	焹	焺	焻	焼	焽	焾	焿
U+714x	煀	煁	煂	煃	煄	煅	煆	煇	煈	煉	煊	煋	煌	煍	煎	煏
U+715x	煐	煑	煒	煓	煔	煕	煖	煗	煘	煙	煚	煛	煜	煝	煞	煟
U+716x	煠	煡	煢	煣	煤	煥	煦	照	煨	煩	煪	煫	煬	煭	煮	煯
U+717x	煰	煱	煲	煳	煴	煵	煶	煷	煸	煹	煺	煻	煼	煽	煾	煿
U+718x	熀	熁	熂	熃	熄	熅	熆	熇	熈	熉	熊	熋	熌	熍	熎	熏
U+719x	熐	熑	熒	熓	熔	熕	熖	熗	熘	熙	熚	熛	熜	熝	熞	熟
U+71Ax	熠	熡	熢	熣	熤	熥	熦	熧	熨	熩	熪	熫	熬	熭	熮	熯
U+71Bx	熰	熱	熲	熳	熴	熵	熶	熷	熸	熹	熺	熻	熼	熽	熾	熿
U+71Cx	燀	燁	燂	燃	燄	燅	燆	燇	燈	燉	燊	燋	燌	燍	燎	燏
U+71Dx	燐	燑	燒	燓	燔	燕	燖	燗	燘	燙	燚	燛	燜	燝	燞	營
U+71Ex	燠	燡	燢	燣	燤	燥	燦	燧	燨	燩	燪	燫	燬	燭	燮	燯
U+71Fx	燰	燱	燲	燳	燴	燵	燶	燷	燸	燹	燺	燻	燼	燽	燾	燿
U+720x	爀	爁	爂	爃	爄	爅	爆	爇	爈	爉	爊	爋	爌	爍	爎	爏
U+721x	爐	爑	爒	爓	爔	爕	爖	爗	爘	爙	爚	爛	爜	爝	爞	爟
U+722x	爠	爡	爢	爣	爤	爥	爦	爧	爨	爩	爪	爫	爬	爭	爮	爯
U+723x	爰	爱	爲	爳	爴	爵	父	爷	爸	爹	爺	爻	爼	爽	爾	爿
U+724x	牀	牁	牂	牃	牄	牅	牆	片	版	牉	牊	牋	牌	牍	牎	牏
U+725x	牐	牑	牒	牓	牔	牕	牖	牗	牘	牙	牚	牛	牜	牝	牞	牟
U+726x	牠	牡	牢	牣	牤	牥	牦	牧	牨	物	牪	牫	牬	牭	牮	牯
U+727x	牰	牱	牲	牳	牴	牵	牶	牷	牸	特	牺	牻	牼	牽	牾	牿
U+728x	犀	犁	犂	犃	犄	犅	犆	犇	犈	犉	犊	犋	犌	犍	犎	犏
U+729x	犐	犑	犒	犓	犔	犕	犖	犗	犘	犙	犚	犛	犜	犝	犞	犟
U+72Ax	犠	犡	犢	犣	犤	犥	犦	犧	犨	犩	犪	犫	犬	犭	犮	犯
U+72Bx	犰	犱	犲	犳	犴	犵	状	犷	犸	犹	犺	犻	犼	犽	犾	犿
U+72Cx	狀	狁	狂	狃	狄	狅	狆	狇	狈	狉	狊	狋	狌	狍	狎	狏
U+72Dx	狐	狑	狒	狓	狔	狕	狖	狗	狘	狙	狚	狛	狜	狝	狞	狟
U+72Ex	狠	狡	狢	狣	狤	狥	狦	狧	狨	狩	狪	狫	独	狭	狮	狯
U+72Fx	狰	狱	狲	狳	狴	狵	狶	狷	狸	狹	狺	狻	狼	狽	狾	狿
U+730x	猀	猁	猂	猃	猄	猅	猆	猇	猈	猉	猊	猋	猌	猍	猎	猏
U+731x	猐	猑	猒	猓	猔	猕	猖	猗	猘	猙	猚	猛	猜	猝	猞	猟
U+732x	猠	猡	猢	猣	猤	猥	猦	猧	猨	猩	猪	猫	猬	猭	献	猯
U+733x	猰	猱	猲	猳	猴	猵	猶	猷	猸	猹	猺	猻	猼	猽	猾	猿
U+734x	獀	獁	獂	獃	獄	獅	獆	獇	獈	獉	獊	獋	獌	獍	獎	獏
U+735x	獐	獑	獒	獓	獔	獕	獖	獗	獘	獙	獚	獛	獜	獝	獞	獟
U+736x	獠	獡	獢	獣	獤	獥	獦	獧	獨	獩	獪	獫	獬	獭	獮	獯
U+737x	獰	獱	獲	獳	獴	獵	獶	獷	獸	獹	獺	獻	獼	獽	獾	獿
U+738x	玀	玁	玂	玃	玄	玅	玆	率	玈	玉	玊	王	玌	玍	玎	玏
U+739x	玐	玑	玒	玓	玔	玕	玖	玗	玘	玙	玚	玛	玜	玝	玞	玟
U+73Ax	玠	玡	玢	玣	玤	玥	玦	玧	玨	玩	玪	玫	玬	玭	玮	环
U+73Bx	现	玱	玲	玳	玴	玵	玶	玷	玸	玹	玺	玻	玼	玽	玾	玿
U+73Cx	珀	珁	珂	珃	珄	珅	珆	珇	珈	珉	珊	珋	珌	珍	珎	珏
U+73Dx	珐	珑	珒	珓	珔	珕	珖	珗	珘	珙	珚	珛	珜	珝	珞	珟
U+73Ex	珠	珡	珢	珣	珤	珥	珦	珧	珨	珩	珪	珫	珬	班	珮	珯
U+73Fx	珰	珱	珲	珳	珴	珵	珶	珷	珸	珹	珺	珻	珼	珽	現	珿
U+740x	琀	琁	琂	球	琄	琅	理	琇	琈	琉	琊	琋	琌	琍	琎	琏
U+741x	琐	琑	琒	琓	琔	琕	琖	琗	琘	琙	琚	琛	琜	琝	琞	琟
U+742x	琠	琡	琢	琣	琤	琥	琦	琧	琨	琩	琪	琫	琬	琭	琮	琯
U+743x	琰	琱	琲	琳	琴	琵	琶	琷	琸	琹	琺	琻	琼	琽	琾	琿
U+744x	瑀	瑁	瑂	瑃	瑄	瑅	瑆	瑇	瑈	瑉	瑊	瑋	瑌	瑍	瑎	瑏
U+745x	瑐	瑑	瑒	瑓	瑔	瑕	瑖	瑗	瑘	瑙	瑚	瑛	瑜	瑝	瑞	瑟
U+746x	瑠	瑡	瑢	瑣	瑤	瑥	瑦	瑧	瑨	瑩	瑪	瑫	瑬	瑭	瑮	瑯
U+747x	瑰	瑱	瑲	瑳	瑴	瑵	瑶	瑷	瑸	瑹	瑺	瑻	瑼	瑽	瑾	瑿
U+748x	璀	璁	璂	璃	璄	璅	璆	璇	璈	璉	璊	璋	璌	璍	璎	璏
U+749x	璐	璑	璒	璓	璔	璕	璖	璗	璘	璙	璚	璛	璜	璝	璞	璟
U+74Ax	璠	璡	璢	璣	璤	璥	璦	璧	璨	璩	璪	璫	璬	璭	璮	璯
U+74Bx	環	璱	璲	璳	璴	璵	璶	璷	璸	璹	璺	璻	璼	璽	璾	璿
U+74Cx	瓀	瓁	瓂	瓃	瓄	瓅	瓆	瓇	瓈	瓉	瓊	瓋	瓌	瓍	瓎	瓏
U+74Dx	瓐	瓑	瓒	瓓	瓔	瓕	瓖	瓗	瓘	瓙	瓚	瓛	瓜	瓝	瓞	瓟
U+74Ex	瓠	瓡	瓢	瓣	瓤	瓥	瓦	瓧	瓨	瓩	瓪	瓫	瓬	瓭	瓮	瓯
U+74Fx	瓰	瓱	瓲	瓳	瓴	瓵	瓶	瓷	瓸	瓹	瓺	瓻	瓼	瓽	瓾	瓿
U+750x	甀	甁	甂	甃	甄	甅	甆	甇	甈	甉	甊	甋	甌	甍	甎	甏
U+751x	甐	甑	甒	甓	甔	甕	甖	甗	甘	甙	甚	甛	甜	甝	甞	生
U+752x	甠	甡	產	産	甤	甥	甦	甧	用	甩	甪	甫	甬	甭	甮	甯
U+753x	田	由	甲	申	甴	电	甶	男	甸	甹	町	画	甼	甽	甾	甿
U+754x	畀	畁	畂	畃	畄	畅	畆	畇	畈	畉	畊	畋	界	畍	畎	畏
U+755x	畐	畑	畒	畓	畔	畕	畖	畗	畘	留	畚	畛	畜	畝	畞	畟
U+756x	畠	畡	畢	畣	畤	略	畦	畧	畨	畩	番	畫	畬	畭	畮	畯
U+757x	異	畱	畲	畳	畴	畵	當	畷	畸	畹	畺	畻	畼	畽	畾	畿
U+758x	疀	疁	疂	疃	疄	疅	疆	疇	疈	疉	疊	疋	疌	疍	疎	疏
U+759x	疐	疑	疒	疓	疔	疕	疖	疗	疘	疙	疚	疛	疜	疝	疞	疟
U+75Ax	疠	疡	疢	疣	疤	疥	疦	疧	疨	疩	疪	疫	疬	疭	疮	疯
U+75Bx	疰	疱	疲	疳	疴	疵	疶	疷	疸	疹	疺	疻	疼	疽	疾	疿
U+75Cx	痀	痁	痂	痃	痄	病	痆	症	痈	痉	痊	痋	痌	痍	痎	痏
U+75Dx	痐	痑	痒	痓	痔	痕	痖	痗	痘	痙	痚	痛	痜	痝	痞	痟
U+75Ex	痠	痡	痢	痣	痤	痥	痦	痧	痨	痩	痪	痫	痬	痭	痮	痯
U+75Fx	痰	痱	痲	痳	痴	痵	痶	痷	痸	痹	痺	痻	痼	痽	痾	痿
U+760x	瘀	瘁	瘂	瘃	瘄	瘅	瘆	瘇	瘈	瘉	瘊	瘋	瘌	瘍	瘎	瘏
U+761x	瘐	瘑	瘒	瘓	瘔	瘕	瘖	瘗	瘘	瘙	瘚	瘛	瘜	瘝	瘞	瘟
U+762x	瘠	瘡	瘢	瘣	瘤	瘥	瘦	瘧	瘨	瘩	瘪	瘫	瘬	瘭	瘮	瘯
U+763x	瘰	瘱	瘲	瘳	瘴	瘵	瘶	瘷	瘸	瘹	瘺	瘻	瘼	瘽	瘾	瘿
U+764x	癀	癁	療	癃	癄	癅	癆	癇	癈	癉	癊	癋	癌	癍	癎	癏
U+765x	癐	癑	癒	癓	癔	癕	癖	癗	癘	癙	癚	癛	癜	癝	癞	癟
U+766x	癠	癡	癢	癣	癤	癥	癦	癧	癨	癩	癪	癫	癬	癭	癮	癯
U+767x	癰	癱	癲	癳	癴	癵	癶	癷	癸	癹	発	登	發	白	百	癿
U+768x	皀	皁	皂	皃	的	皅	皆	皇	皈	皉	皊	皋	皌	皍	皎	皏
U+769x	皐	皑	皒	皓	皔	皕	皖	皗	皘	皙	皚	皛	皜	皝	皞	皟
U+76Ax	皠	皡	皢	皣	皤	皥	皦	皧	皨	皩	皪	皫	皬	皭	皮	皯
U+76Bx	皰	皱	皲	皳	皴	皵	皶	皷	皸	皹	皺	皻	皼	皽	皾	皿
U+76Cx	盀	盁	盂	盃	盄	盅	盆	盇	盈	盉	益	盋	盌	盍	盎	盏
U+76Dx	盐	监	盒	盓	盔	盕	盖	盗	盘	盙	盚	盛	盜	盝	盞	盟
U+76Ex	盠	盡	盢	監	盤	盥	盦	盧	盨	盩	盪	盫	盬	盭	目	盯
U+76Fx	盰	盱	盲	盳	直	盵	盶	盷	相	盹	盺	盻	盼	盽	盾	盿
U+770x	眀	省	眂	眃	眄	眅	眆	眇	眈	眉	眊	看	県	眍	眎	眏
U+771x	眐	眑	眒	眓	眔	眕	眖	眗	眘	眙	眚	眛	眜	眝	眞	真
U+772x	眠	眡	眢	眣	眤	眥	眦	眧	眨	眩	眪	眫	眬	眭	眮	眯
U+773x	眰	眱	眲	眳	眴	眵	眶	眷	眸	眹	眺	眻	眼	眽	眾	眿
U+774x	着	睁	睂	睃	睄	睅	睆	睇	睈	睉	睊	睋	睌	睍	睎	睏
U+775x	睐	睑	睒	睓	睔	睕	睖	睗	睘	睙	睚	睛	睜	睝	睞	睟
U+776x	睠	睡	睢	督	睤	睥	睦	睧	睨	睩	睪	睫	睬	睭	睮	睯
U+777x	睰	睱	睲	睳	睴	睵	睶	睷	睸	睹	睺	睻	睼	睽	睾	睿
U+778x	瞀	瞁	瞂	瞃	瞄	瞅	瞆	瞇	瞈	瞉	瞊	瞋	瞌	瞍	瞎	瞏
U+779x	瞐	瞑	瞒	瞓	瞔	瞕	瞖	瞗	瞘	瞙	瞚	瞛	瞜	瞝	瞞	瞟
U+77Ax	瞠	瞡	瞢	瞣	瞤	瞥	瞦	瞧	瞨	瞩	瞪	瞫	瞬	瞭	瞮	瞯
U+77Bx	瞰	瞱	瞲	瞳	瞴	瞵	瞶	瞷	瞸	瞹	瞺	瞻	瞼	瞽	瞾	瞿
U+77Cx	矀	矁	矂	矃	矄	矅	矆	矇	矈	矉	矊	矋	矌	矍	矎	矏
U+77Dx	矐	矑	矒	矓	矔	矕	矖	矗	矘	矙	矚	矛	矜	矝	矞	矟
U+77Ex	矠	矡	矢	矣	矤	知	矦	矧	矨	矩	矪	矫	矬	短	矮	矯
U+77Fx	矰	矱	矲	石	矴	矵	矶	矷	矸	矹	矺	矻	矼	矽	矾	矿
Notes 1.As of Unicode version 18.0
