= Jingtai station =

Jingtai station may refer to:

- Jingtai station (Beijing Subway), in Beijing, China
- Jingtai station (Guangzhou Metro), in Guangzhou, Guangdong Province, China
