= 2016 Guangzhou Power season =

- Head coach: Ernesto Purnsley
- Home stadium: Guangzhou Gymnasium

Results
- Record: 2–3
- Conference place: 4th

The 2016 Guangzhou Power season was the first season for the arena football franchise in the China Arena Football League (CAFL). The team was coached by Ernesto Purnsley and played their home games at Guangzhou Gymnasium.

== Standings ==
2016 CAFL standings
Team	Overall			Points		Records	
Team	W	L	PCT	PF	PA	Home	Away
Beijing Lions	5	0	1.000	274	184	2–0	3–0
Qingdao Clipper	3	2	.600	205	204	1–1	2–1
Shanghai Skywalkers	3	2	.600	271	206	2–1	1–1
Guangzhou Power	2	3	.400	186	184	2–1	0–2
Shenzhen Naja	2	3	.400	222	215	2–1	0–2
Dalian Dragon Kings	0	5	.000	98	263	0–2	0–3

== Regular season ==
Week	Date	Opponent	Result	Record	Game site	Recap
1	October 1	at Qingdao Clipper	L 38–35	0–1	LeSports Center	
2	October 8	at Shanghai Skywalkers	L 45–32	0–2	Damai Center	
3	October 15	Dalian Dragon Kings	W 40–7	1–2	Guoxin Gymnasium	
