= Luhu Lake station (Guangzhou Metro) =

Guangzhou Metro Line 12 station under construction

Luhu Lake 麓湖

Chinese name
- Chinese: 麓湖站
Transcriptions
Standard Mandarin
- Hanyu Pinyin: Lùhú Zhàn
Yue: Cantonese
- Yale Romanization: Lūhkwù Jaahm
- Jyutping: Luk^{1}wu^{4} Zaam^{6}

General information
- Location: Southwest side of Luhu Lake; Dengfeng Subdistrict, Yuexiu District, Guangzhou, Guangdong; China
- Coordinates: 23°8′48.62″N 113°16′32.45″E
- Operated by: Guangzhou Metro Co. Ltd.
- Line: Line 12
- Platforms: 2 (1 island platform)
- Tracks: 2

Construction
- Structure type: Underground
- Accessible: Yes

Other information
- Station code: 1213

History
- Opened: December 2026 (7 months' time) (expected)
- Previous names: Hengfu Road (恒福路)

Services
| Preceding station | Guangzhou Metro | Following station |
Future services (2026)
| Guangzhou University of Chinese Medicine towards Xunfenggang | Line 12 | Jianshe 6th Road towards Higher Education Mega Center South |
Location

Luhu Lake station (Chinese: 麓湖站; pinyin: Lùhú Zhàn; Cantonese Yale: Lūhkwù Jaahm) is a station under construction on Line 12 of the Guangzhou Metro. It is located underground southwest of Luhu Lake in Guangzhou's Yuexiu District. The station is expected to open in 2026.

== Station layout ==
This station is a three-story underground station. The ground level is the station entrance and exit, and it is surrounded by Luhu Lake Park, Luhu Road and Hengfu Road. The first floor is the concourse, the second floor is the equipment level, and the third floor is the platform for Line 12. There are 2 wind shafts.

| G | - | Exits |
| L1; Concourse | Lobby | Ticket Machines, Customer Service, Shops, Police Station, Security Facilities |
| L2 | Mezzanine | Station Equipment |
| L3; Platforms | Platform 2 | 12 towards Xunfenggang (Guangzhou University of Chinese Medicine) |
| L3; Platforms | Island platform, doors will open on the left (Toilets, Nursery) |
| L3; Platforms | Platform 1 | 12 towards Higher Education Mega Center South (Jianshe 6th Road) |

=== Concourse ===
There are automatic ticket machines and an AI customer service center at the concourse. There are elevators, escalators, and stairs in the fare-paid area for passengers to reach the platform.

=== Platform ===
The station has an island platform located under the west side of the intersection of Hengfu Road and Luhu Road.

== History ==
Line 12 was originally planned to have a station of the same name on Lujing West Road. In the August 2017 EIA, Lujing West Road station was moved east to the junction of Hengfu Road and Luhu Road, and Hengfu Road station was set up. The station was subsequently built.

Due to the station's need to occupy part of the site of Luhu Children's Park for construction, the latter has been closed since 30 June 2019. On 18 May 2021, the main structure topped out.

On 8 April 2025, the preliminary name of the stations on Line 12 (Xunfenggang-Luhu Lake Section) was announced, and the station was planned to be named Luhu Lake station, which was officially confirmed the following month.
