= Dajinzhong Road station =

Guangzhou Metro Line 11 station

Dajinzhong Road 大金钟路
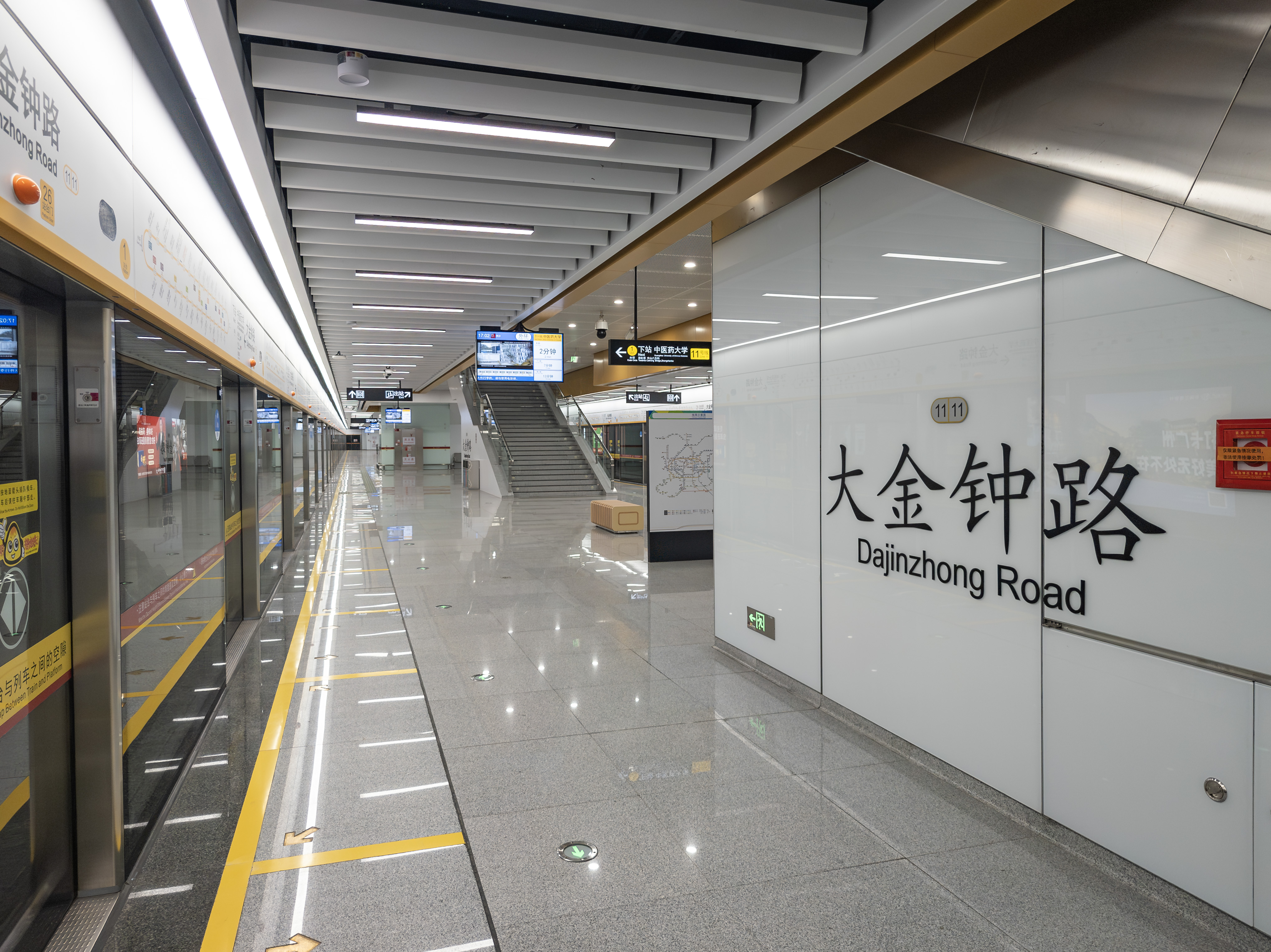
- Platform

Chinese name
- Simplified Chinese: 大金钟路站
- Traditional Chinese: 大金鐘路站
Transcriptions
Standard Mandarin
- Hanyu Pinyin: Dàjīnzhōnglù Zhàn
Yue: Cantonese
- Yale Romanization: Dǎaigāmjūnglou Jaahm
- Jyutping: Daai^{6}gam^{1}zung^{1}lou^{6} Zaam^{6}

General information
- Location: Intersection of Jingyun Road (景云路), Fuyue Street (富悦街) and Hetian Road (河田路), Jingtai Subdistrict; Baiyun District, Guangzhou, Guangdong; China
- Coordinates: 23°9′52.06″N 113°16′19.38″E
- Operator: Guangzhou Metro Co. Ltd.
- Line: Line 11
- Platforms: 2 (1 island platform)
- Tracks: 2

Construction
- Structure type: Underground
- Accessible: Yes

Other information
- Station code: 1111

History
- Opened: 28 December 2024 (19 months ago)

Services
Preceding station	Guangzhou Metro	Following station
Guangzhou University of Chinese Medicine Outer Circle	Line 11	Yuntai Garden Inner Circle
Location

Dajinzhong Road Station (simplified Chinese: 大金钟路站; traditional Chinese: 大金鐘路站; pinyin: Dàjīnzhōnglù Zhàn; Cantonese Yale: Dǎaigāmjūnglou Jaahm; lit. 'Big Gold Clock Road station') is a station on Line 11 of the Guangzhou Metro. It started operations on 28 December 2024. It is located underground at the intersection of Jingyun Road, Fuyue Street and Hetian Road in Baiyun District.

== Station Layout ==
G	-	Exits B & C
L1	Lobby	Ticket Machines, Customer Service, Shops, Police Station, Security Facilities
L2	Mezzanine	Station Equipment
L3; Platforms	Platform 1	11 Outer Circle (Guangzhou University of Chinese Medicine)
L3; Platforms	Island platform, doors will open on the left (Toilets, Nursery)
L3; Platforms	Platform 2	11 Inner Circle (Yuntai Garden)

=== Entrances/exits ===
The station has 2 points of entry/exit. Exit C is equipped with an elevator.

- B: Hetian Road, Guangdong Provincial Second Hospital of Traditional Chinese Medicine
- C: Hetian Road
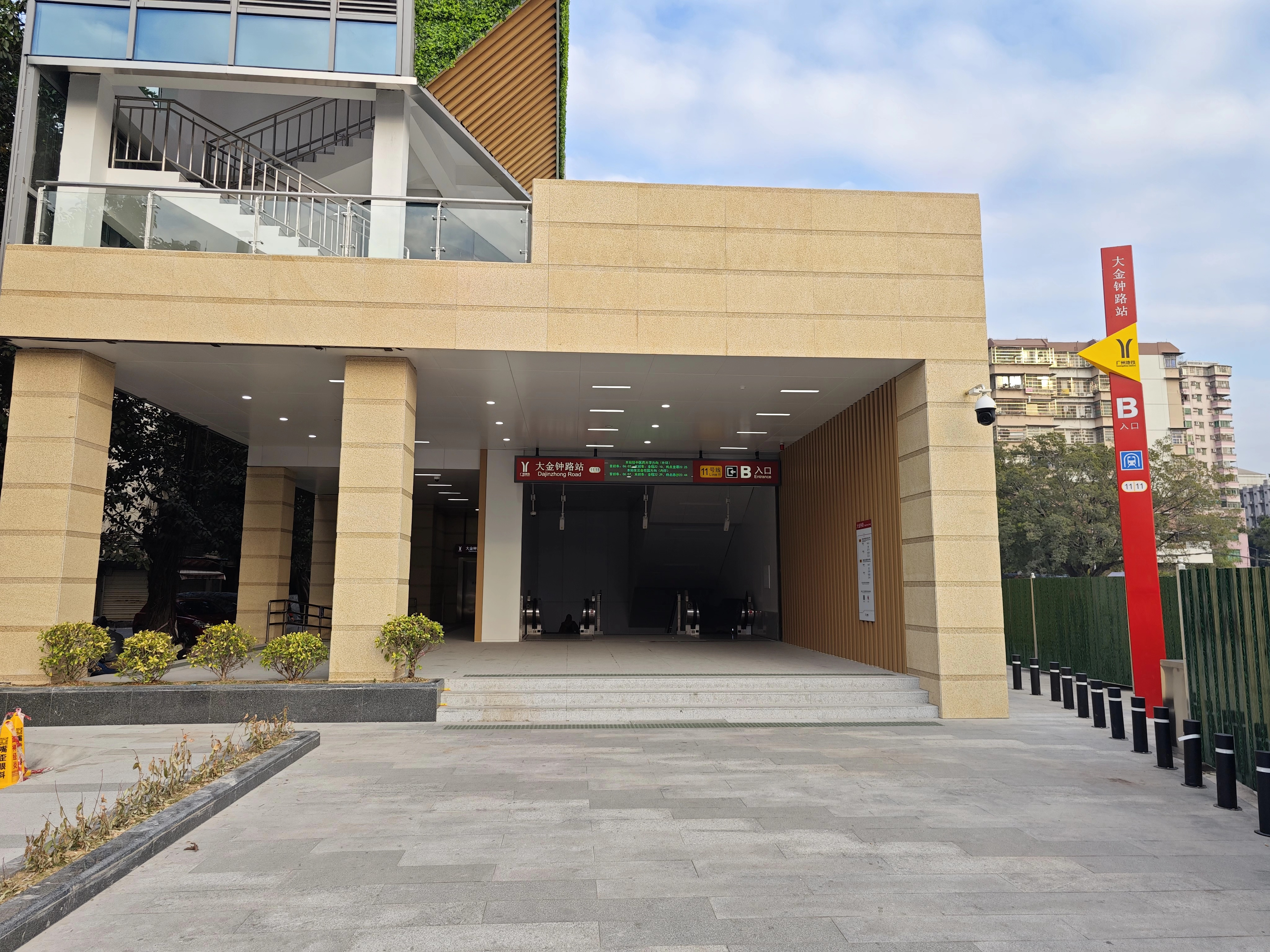
Entrance B

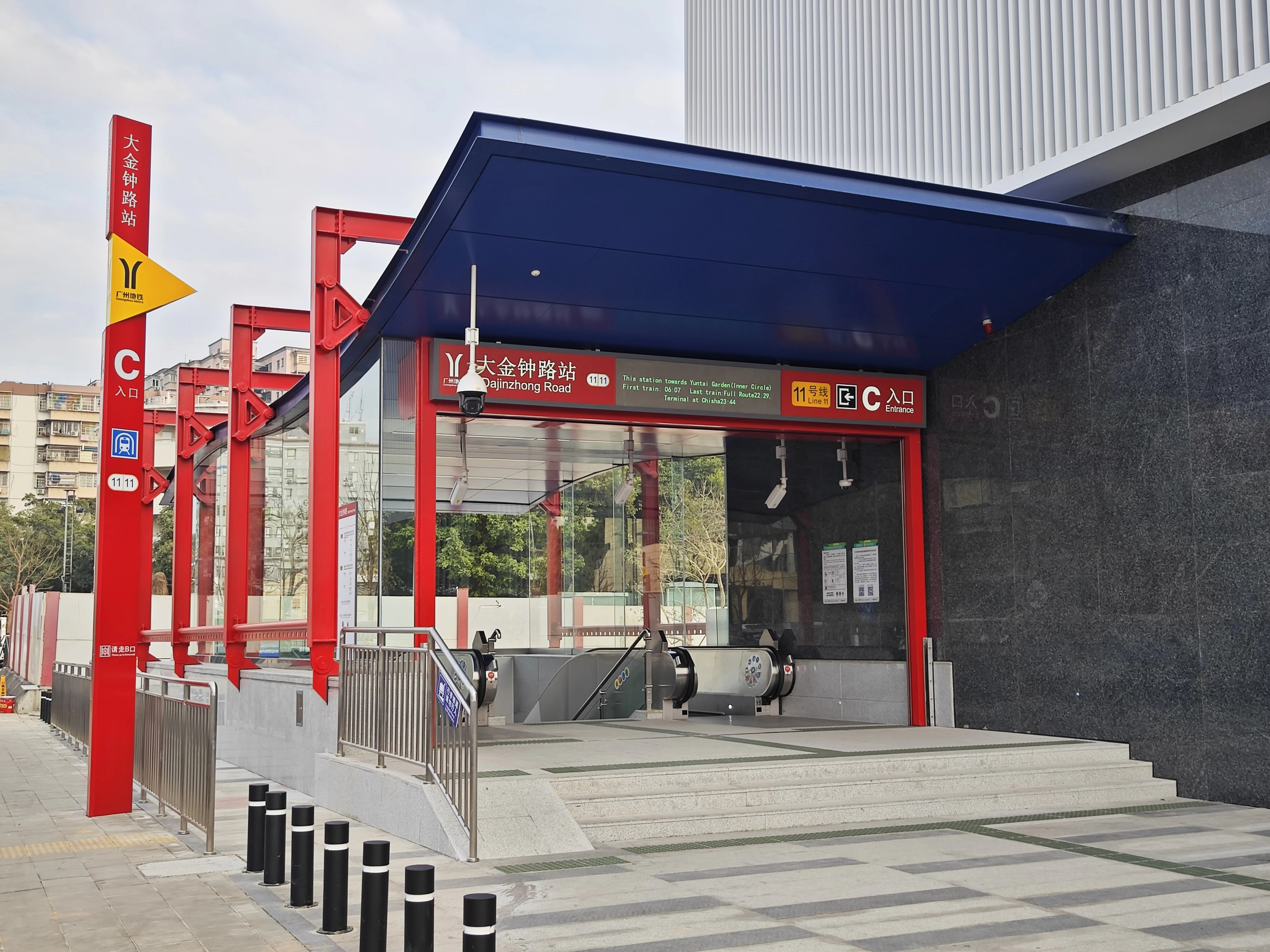
Entrance C

== Gallery ==
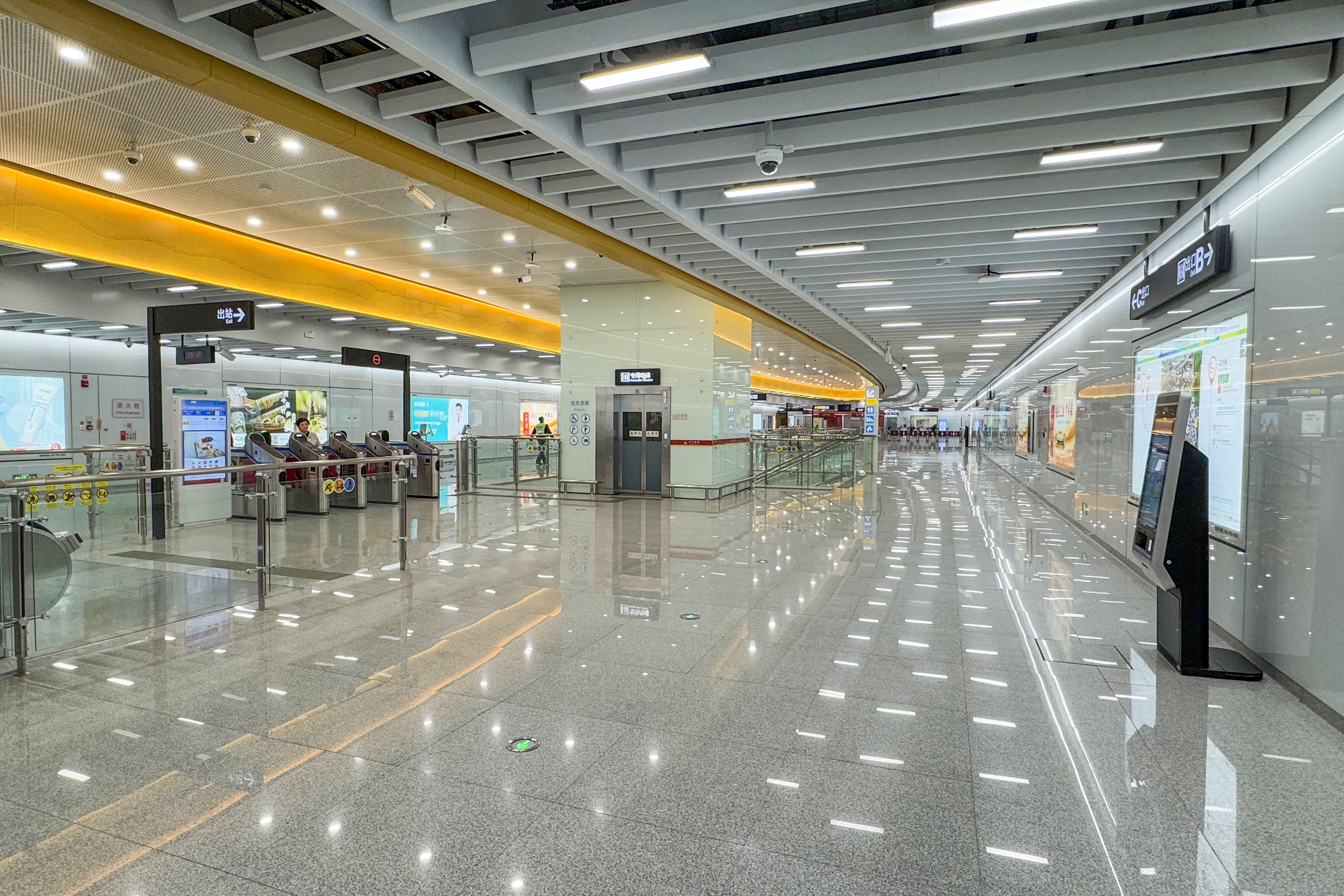
Concourse

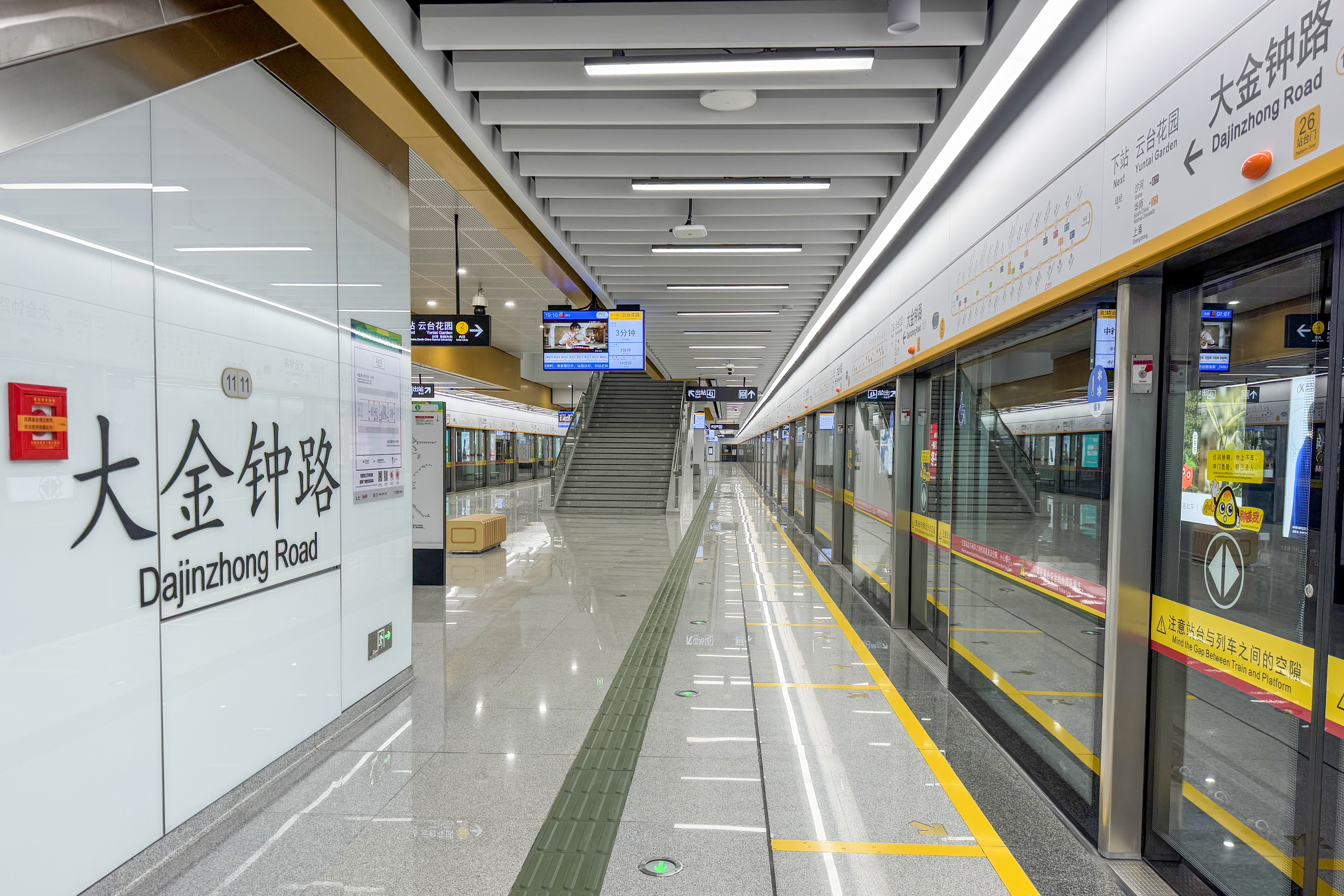
Platform 2 (Inner Circle platform)

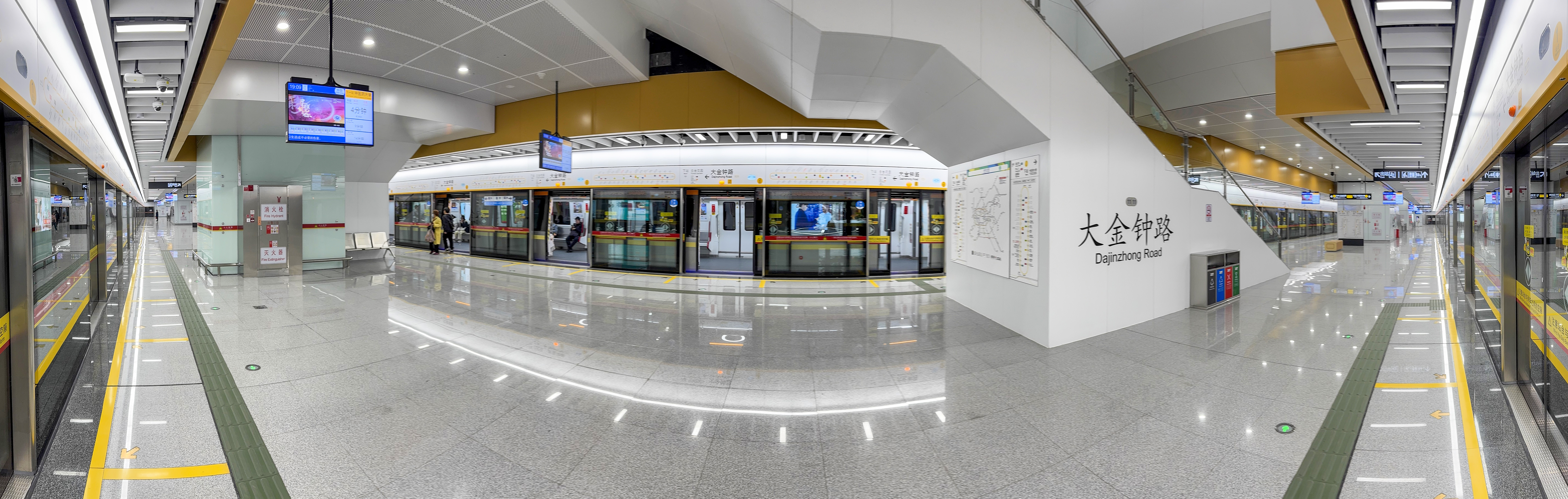
Platform 1 panorama

== History ==
The station construction site was enclosed in August 2017, the construction of the diaphragm wall of the main envelope structure was completed on 12 June 2020, and the main structure was capped in November 2021.

This station was called Jingtaihang station when it was originally planned for the Big and Small Ring Lines, and later called Daijinzhong station during planning and construction. In June 2023, the initial name of the stations of Line 11 was announced, and this station will still maintain its current name. Due to the fact that "Dajinzhong" is said to be easily confused with the area of the Dajinzhong Reservoir 3 km away, the name of the station received a lot of feedback during the publicity period. In May 2024, Guangzhou Metro Group declared that the station should be named Dajinzhong Road station, which was eventually approved.

On 3 July 2024, the station completed the "three rights" transfer. On 28 December, the station was put into use with the opening of Line 11.
