= Guangzhou Gymnasium station =

Guangzhou Metro Line 12 terminus station

Guangzhou Gymnasium 广州体育馆
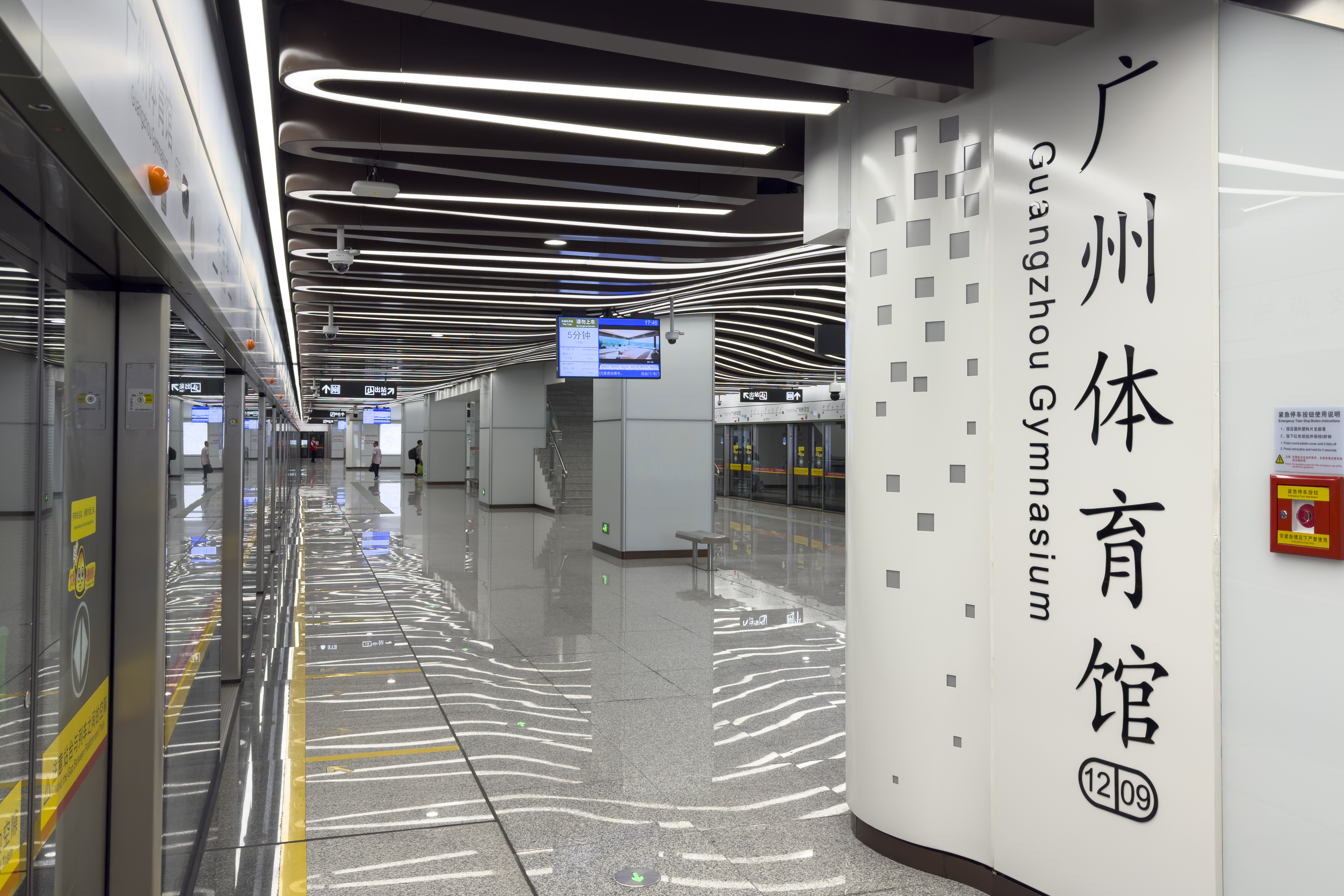
- Platform 1 (termination platform)

Chinese name
- Simplified Chinese: 广州体育馆站
- Traditional Chinese: 廣州體育館站
Transcriptions
Standard Mandarin
- Hanyu Pinyin: Guàngzhōu Tìyùguǎng Zhàn
Yue: Cantonese
- Yale Romanization: Gwóngjāu Táiyuhkgún Jaahm
- Jyutping: Gwong^{2} zau^{1} Tai^{2} juk^{6} gun^{2} Zaam^{6}

General information
- Location: North side of the intersection of Baiyun Avenue South (白云大道南) and Jinyuan Road (金园路); Jingtai Subdistrict, Baiyun District, Guangzhou, Guangdong; China
- Coordinates: 23°10′59.70″N 113°16′22.58″E
- Operator: Guangzhou Metro Co. Ltd.
- Line: Line 12
- Platforms: 2 (1 island platform)
- Tracks: 2

Construction
- Structure type: Underground
- Accessible: Yes

Other information
- Station code: 1209

History
- Opened: 29 June 2025 (13 months ago)
- Former names: Yunxi Park (云溪公园)

Services
Preceding station	Guangzhou Metro	Following station
Baiyun Culture Square towards Xunfenggang	Line 12 West section	Terminus
Future services (2026)
Baiyun Culture Square towards Xunfenggang	Line 12	Jingtai towards Higher Education Mega Center South
Location

Guangzhou Gymnasium station (simplified Chinese: 广州体育馆站; traditional Chinese: 廣州體育館站; pinyin: Guàngzhōu Tìyùguǎng Zhàn; Cantonese Yale: Gwóngjāu Táiyuhkgún Jaahm) is the terminus station for the West section on Line 12 of the Guangzhou Metro. It is located underground on the north side of the intersection of Baiyun Avenue South and Jinyuan Road, in Baiyun District of Guangzhou. The station opened on 29 June 2025.

== Station layout ==
This station is a two-story underground station. The ground level is the exit, and it is surrounded by Baiyun Avenue, the Guangzhou Gymnasium, the Yunxi Botanical Garden and other nearby buildings. The first floor is the concourse, and the second floor is the platform for Line 12.

This station is a cultural themed station on Line 12.

G	-	Exits A, B1, B2
L1; Concourse	Lobby	Ticket Machines, Customer Service, Shops, Police Station, Security Facilities
L2; Platforms	Platform 2	12 towards Xunfenggang (Baiyun Culture Square)
L2; Platforms	Island platform, doors will open on the left (Toilets, Nursery)
L2; Platforms	Platform 1	12 termination platform

=== Concourse ===
There are automatic ticket machines and an AI customer service center at the concourse. There are elevators, escalators, and stairs in the fare-paid area for passengers to reach the platform.

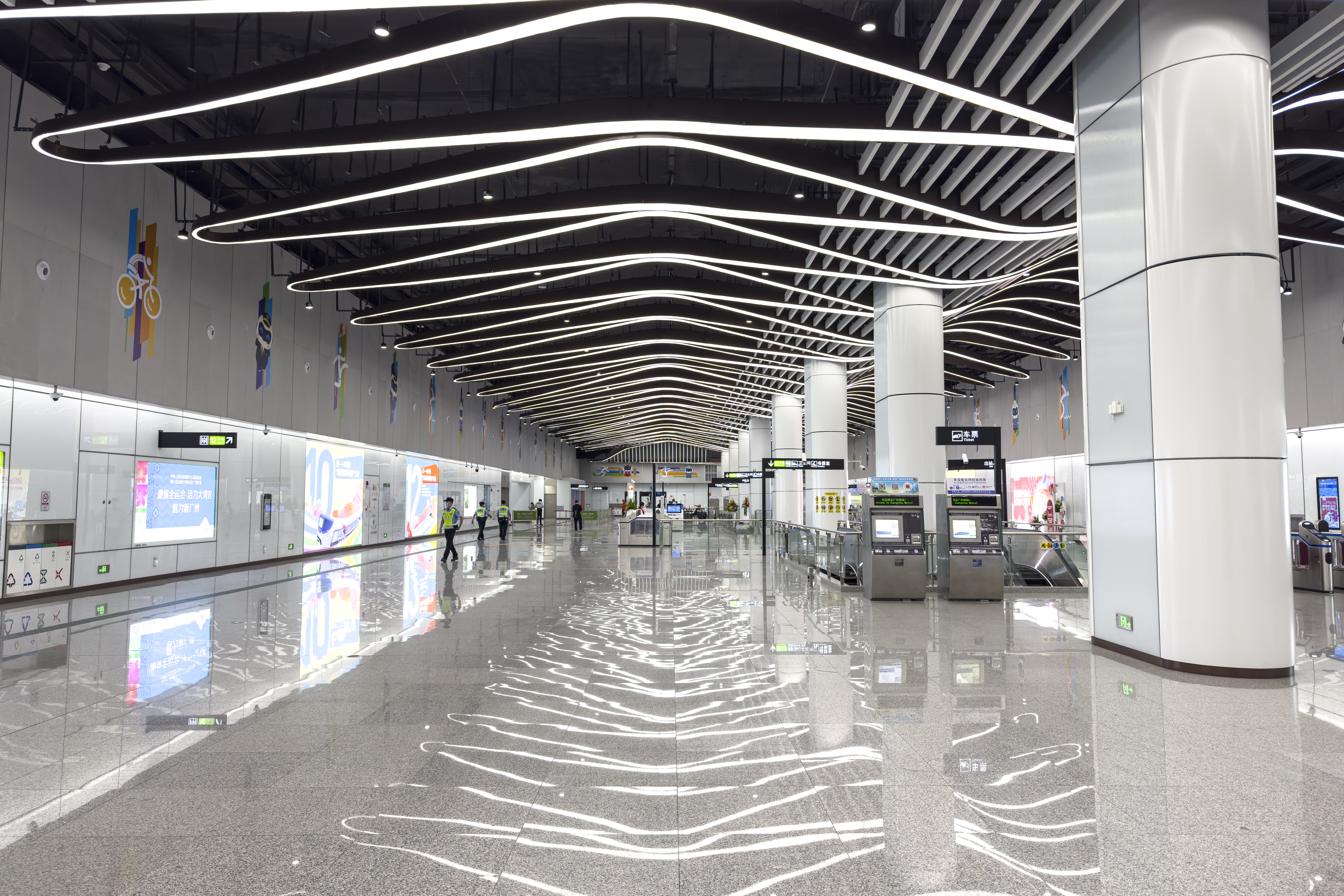
Concourse

=== Platform ===
The station has an island platform located underground on the west side of Baiyun Avenue South. Toilets and a nursery room are located at the southern end of the platform.

In addition, there is a storage track at the south end of the platform that extends to Jingtai station. This station serves as the temporary terminus of the West section of Line 12, so Line 12 will turn back after the station through this storage track.

=== Entrances/exits ===
The station has 3 points of entry/exit, of which Exit B leads to the municipal crossing passage and connects the east and west sides of Baiyun Avenue, where the west entrance is lettered B1 and the east entrance is lettered B2. Exit A is equipped with an elevator.

- A: Baiyun Avenue South, Guangzhou Gymnasium, Yunxi Botanical Garden
- B1: Baiyun Avenue South, Guangzhou Gymnasium
- B2: Baiyun Avenue South, Yunxi Botanical Garden
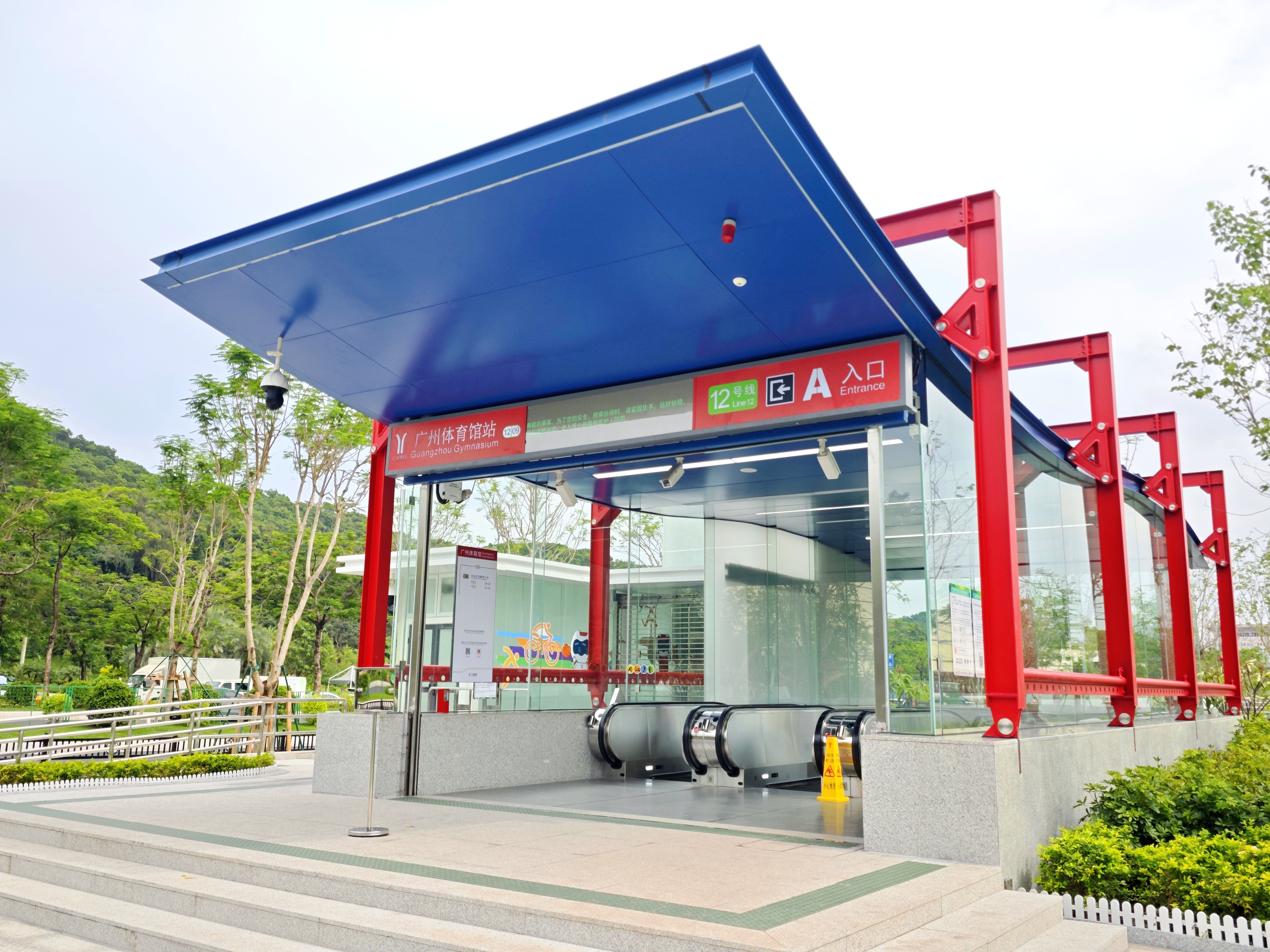
Entrance A

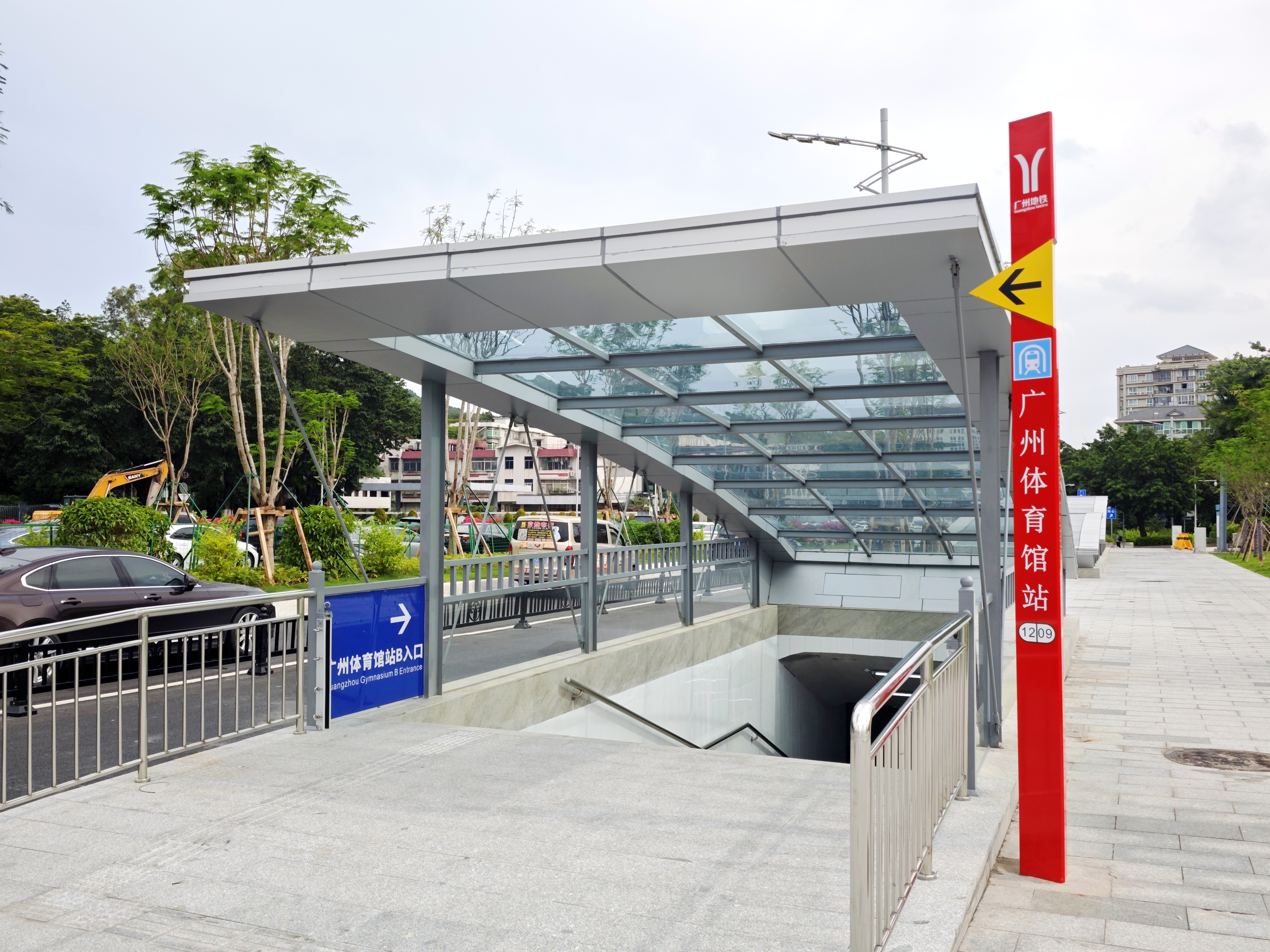
Entrance B1

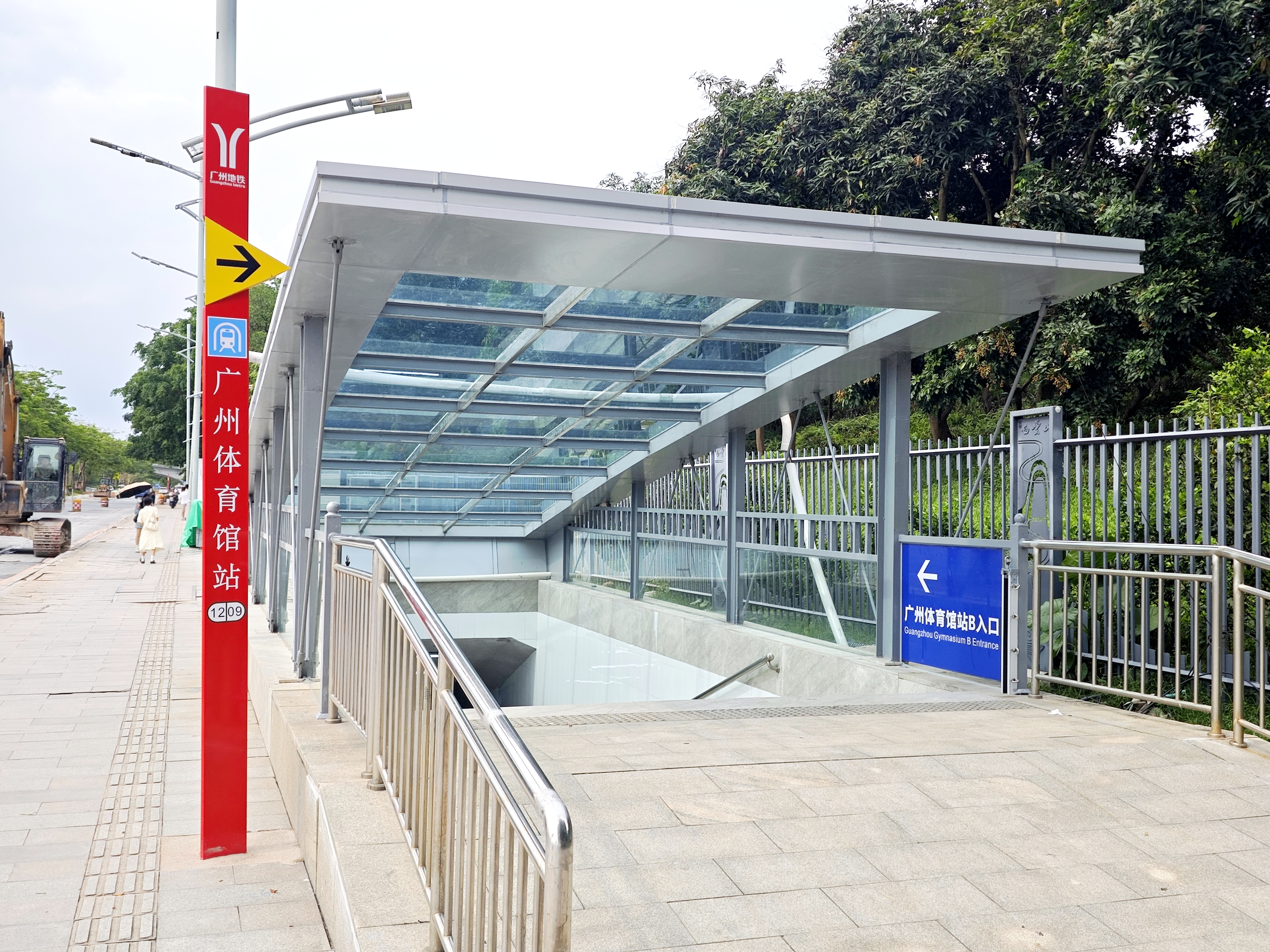
Entrance B2

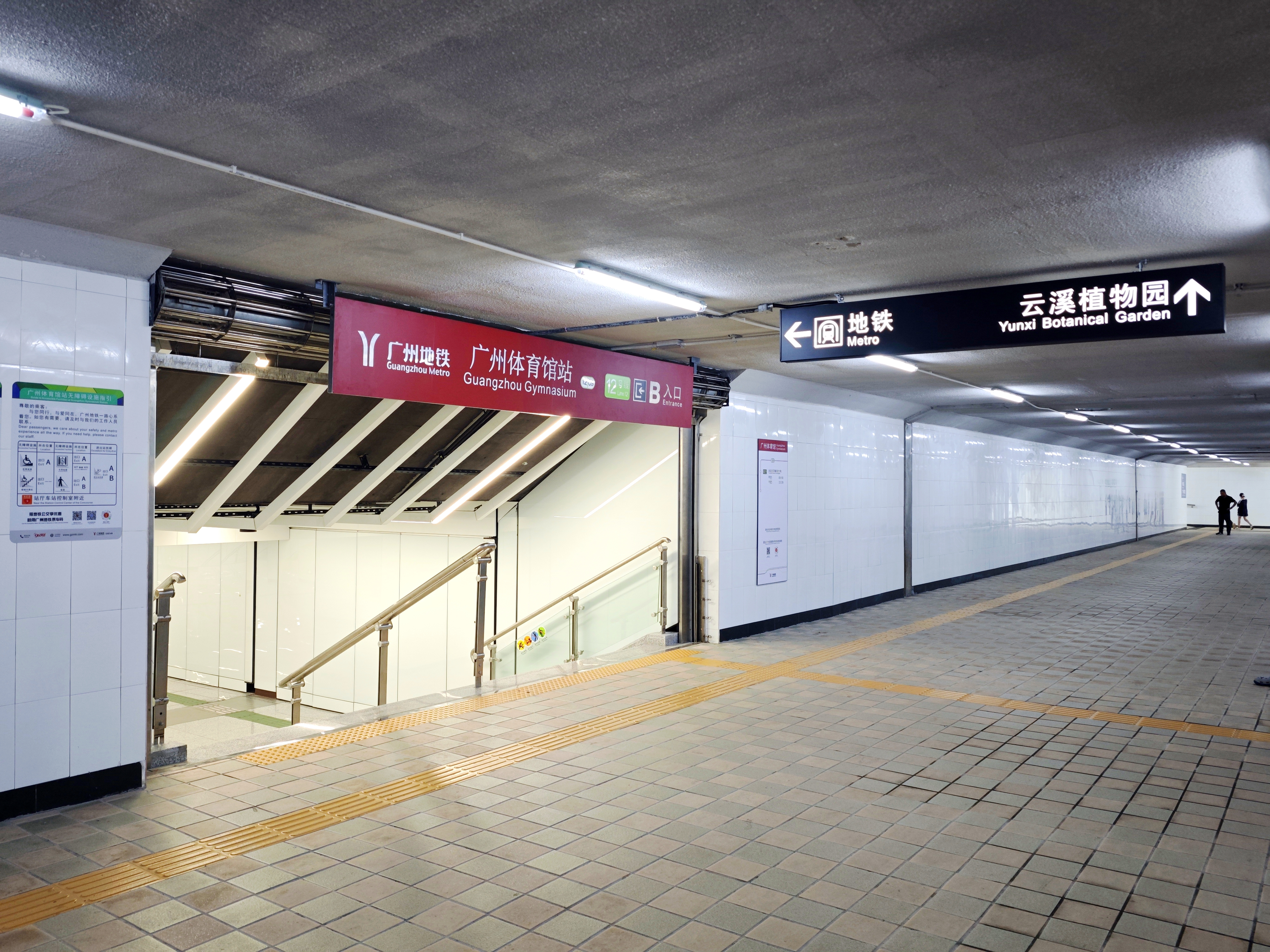
Entrance B Municipal Channel Interface

== History ==
This station was not included in the original plan for Line 12. In response to the planning requirements of connecting to the Tangxi Railway Station (now Guangzhou Baiyun Railway Station), the western section of Line 12 was detoured to the north, and Yunxi Park Station was added near the original Yunxi Ecological Park. This station was eventually built and adjusted to be a transfer station with the planned Foshan Line 8 (now Foshan Line 6), but it was not reserved during construction.

In September 2020, the construction company enclosed the construction site. The station started underground continuous wall construction in January 2021, the roof was sealed in early July 2023, and the "three rights" were transferred in April 2025.

On 8 April 2025, the preliminary name of the station on the west section of Line 12 was announced. The station is proposed to be named Guangzhou Gymnasium station and was officially confirmed the following month.

On 12 June 2025, this station was opened for test rides, serving as the terminus station for the West section of Line 12. On 29 June the same year, the station was officially opened.

== Future expansion ==
In the future, Line 12 trains coming from Xunfenggang station will terminate at Higher Education Mega Center South station once the Middle section of Line 12 opens.
