= Guangzhou University of Chinese Medicine station =

Guangzhou Metro Line 11 and Line 12 station

Guangzhou University of Chinese Medicine 中医药大学
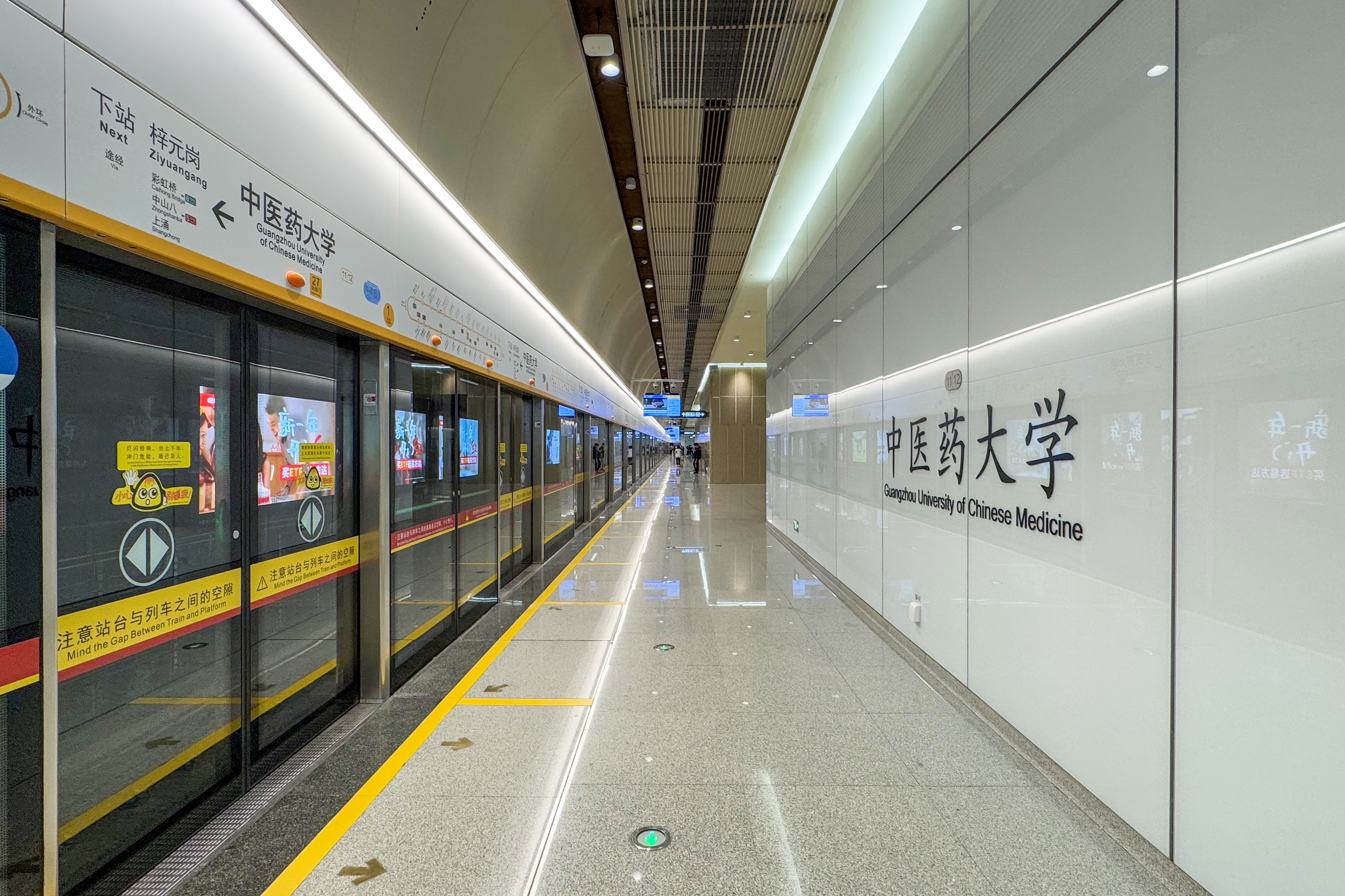
- Platform 1 (Line 11 Outer Circle platform)

Chinese name
- Simplified Chinese: 中医药大学站
- Traditional Chinese: 中醫藥大學站
Transcriptions
Standard Mandarin
- Hanyu Pinyin: Zhōngyīyào Dàxué Zhàn
Yue: Cantonese
- Yale Romanization: Zūngjījǒek Dǎaihǒk Jaahm
- Jyutping: zung^{1} ji^{1}joek^{6} daai^{6}hok^{6} Zaam^{6}

General information
- Location: Witihin Sanyuanli Campus of the Guangzhou University of Chinese Medicine, southwest of intersection of Baiyun Avenue South (白云大道南), Xiatang West Road (下塘西路) and Guangyuan Road Middle (广园中路), Sanyuanli Subdistrict; Baiyun District, Guangzhou, Guangdong; China
- Coordinates: 23°9′36.76″N 113°15′49.90″E
- Operator: Guangzhou Metro Co. Ltd.
- Lines: Line 11; Line 12 (2026)
- Platforms: 4 (2 island platforms)
- Tracks: 4

Construction
- Structure type: Underground
- Accessible: Yes

Other information
- Station code: 1112 1212

History
- Opened: Line 11: 28 December 2024 (22 months ago); Line 12: December 2026 (1 month's time)
- Former names: Guangyuan Xincun (广园新村)

Services
Preceding station	Guangzhou Metro	Following station
Ziyuangang Outer Circle	Line 11	Dajinzhong Road Inner Circle
Future service (2026)
Keziling towards Xunfenggang	Line 12	Luhu Lake towards Higher Education Mega Center South
Location

Guangzhou University of Chinese Medicine Station (simplified Chinese: 中医药大学站; traditional Chinese: 中醫藥大學站; pinyin: Zhōngyīyào Dàxué Zhàn; Cantonese Yale: Zūngjījǒek Dǎaihǒk Jaahm) is a station on Line 11 of the Guangzhou Metro. It started operations on 28 December 2024. It is located underground at the southwest of the intersection of Baiyun Avenue South, Xiatang Road West and Guangyuan Road Middle in Baiyun District. As the name of the station suggests, it is located underground of the Sanyuanli Campus of the Guangzhou University of Chinese Medicine.

== Station Layout ==
This station has four floors. The ground floor are the station entrances and exits, and is surrounded by Guangyuan Middle Road, Xiatang West Road, Zhengmin Road, the Sanyuanli Campus of Guangzhou University of Chinese Medicine and surrounding buildings. The first floor is the transfer floor connecting the entrances and exits to the concourse and also the station equipment area, the second floor is the concourse, the third floor are the Line 12 platforms, and the fourth floor are the Line 11 platforms.

With a total of 48 escalators, the station is one of three stations with more than 40 escalators on the whole of Line 11, the other two being Shahe station and Caihong Bridge station.

G	-	Exits A1, C, D
L1	Lobby	Ticket Machines, Customer Service, Shops, Police Station, Security Facilities
L2	Mezzanine	Station Equipment
L3; 12 Platforms (Unopened)	Platform 4 (U/C)	12 towards Xunfenggang (Keziling)
L3; 12 Platforms (Unopened)	Island platform, doors will open on the left (Toilets, Nursery) (U/C)
L3; 12 Platforms (Unopened)	Platform 3 (U/C)	12 towards Higher Education Mega Center South (Luhu Lake)
L4; 11 Platforms	Platform 1	11 Outer Circle (Ziyuangang)
L4; 11 Platforms	Island platform, doors will open on the left (Toilets, Nursery)
L4; 11 Platforms	Platform 2	11 Inner Circle (Dajinzhong Road)

=== Concourse ===
There are automatic ticket machines and an AI customer service center at the concourse. There are elevators, escalators, and stairs in the fare-paid area for passengers to reach the platforms.

=== Platforms ===
The station has a set of island platforms, located below the Sanyuanli Campus of Guangzhou University of Chinese Medicine. Line 11 is located on the fourth floor, and Line 12 is located on the third floor. The platform level for Line 12 was constructed concurrently within the station's construction. Currently, part of Line 12 is fenced off to prevent passengers from seeing the unfinished platform while riding the escalators.

The toilets and nursery are located at the Dajinzhong Road end of the Line 11 platforms.

=== Station theme ===
The station is a key station of intangible cultural heritage that Line 11 portrays, with the theme of "Cantonese medicine benevolence". The design of the station incorporates many elements of traditional Chinese medicine: the lighting is in warm colors, there are traditional Chinese medicine display windows in the station concourse, and the "Twelve Meridians" decoration is arranged on the ceiling of the station. It is worth mentioning that on the first day of operation, some passengers found an error within the name of a meridian, and the metro corrected it with a sticker the next day.

=== Entrances/exits ===
The station has 3 points of entry/exit. Exit A1 is equipped with an elevator. Exit D was temporarily closed from 28 March 2026 to facilitate the construction of Line 12. Subsequently, the original emergency exit was converted into a formal entrance/exit, lettered D1, while the original D entrance/exit was reassigned as D2. Both were put into operation on 30 October 2026.

- A1: Guangyuan Road Middle, Guangzhou University of Chinese Medicine North Gate, The First Affiliated Hospital of Guangzhou University of Chinese Medicine North Gate
- C: Zhengmin Road, Guangzhou Baiyun District People's Procuratorate, Guangdong Provincial Department of Justice
- D1: Guangyuan Middle Road, Xiatang West Road
- D2: Guangyuan Middle Road, Xiatang West Road
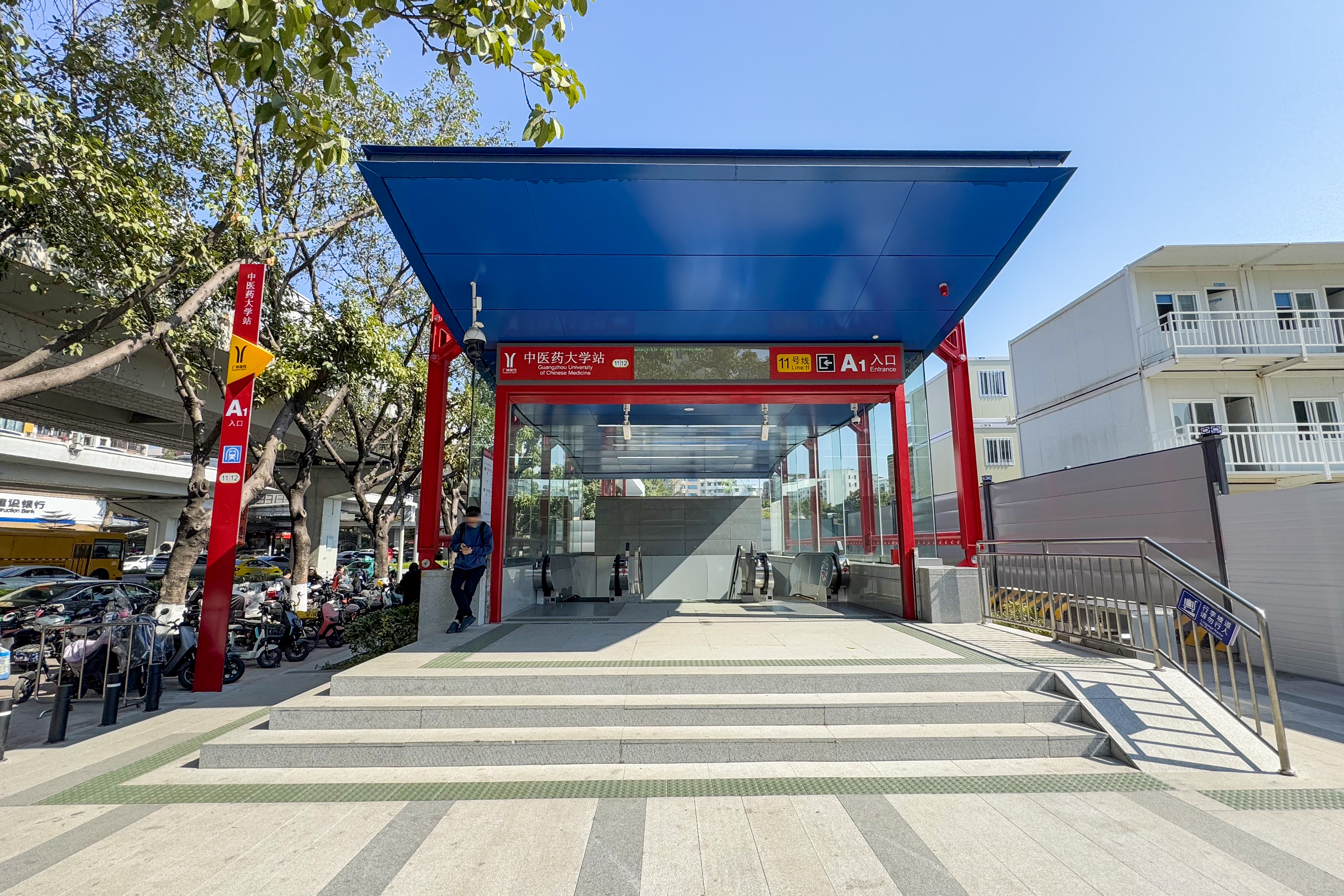
Entrance A1

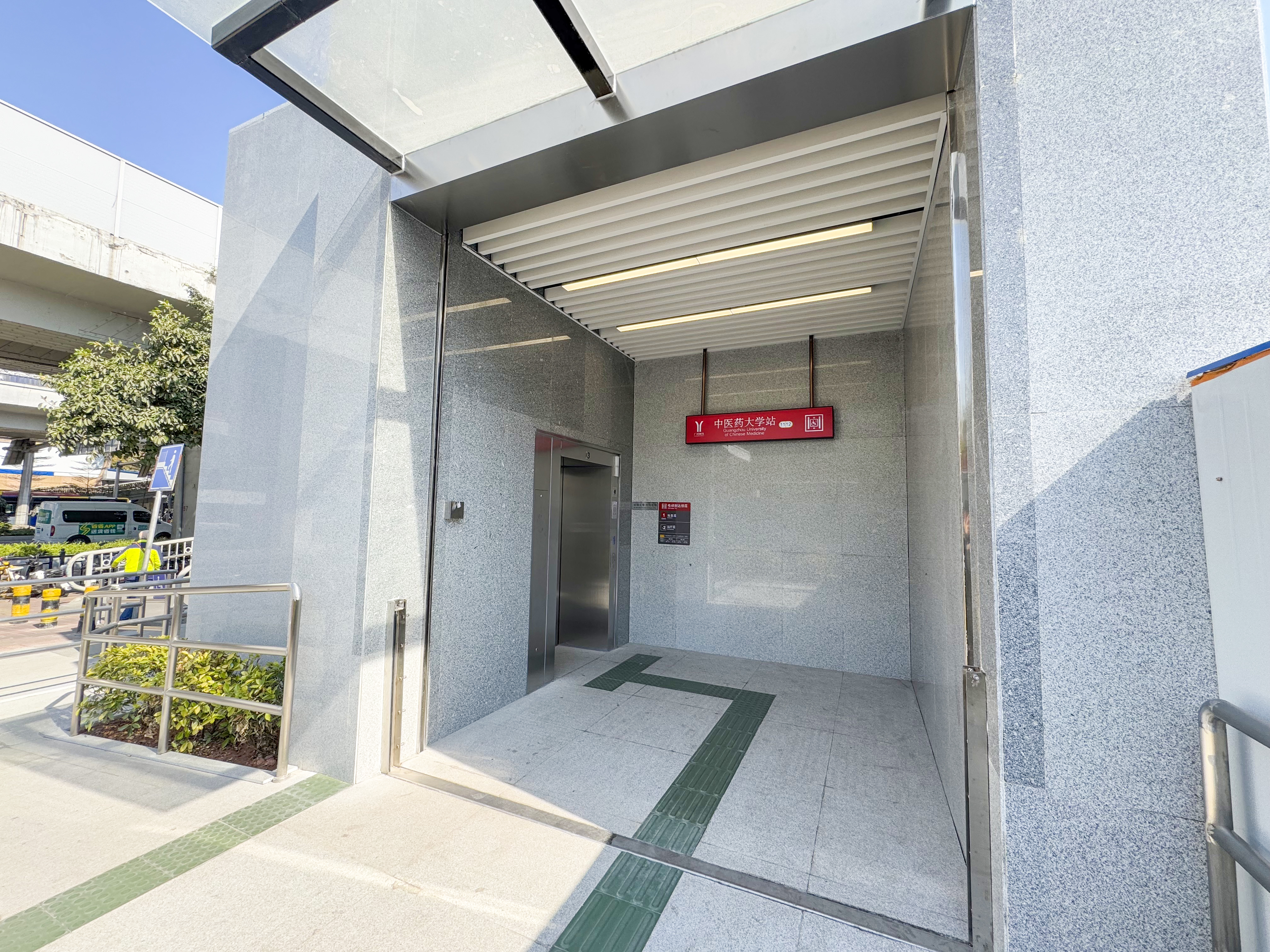
Elevator of Entrance A1

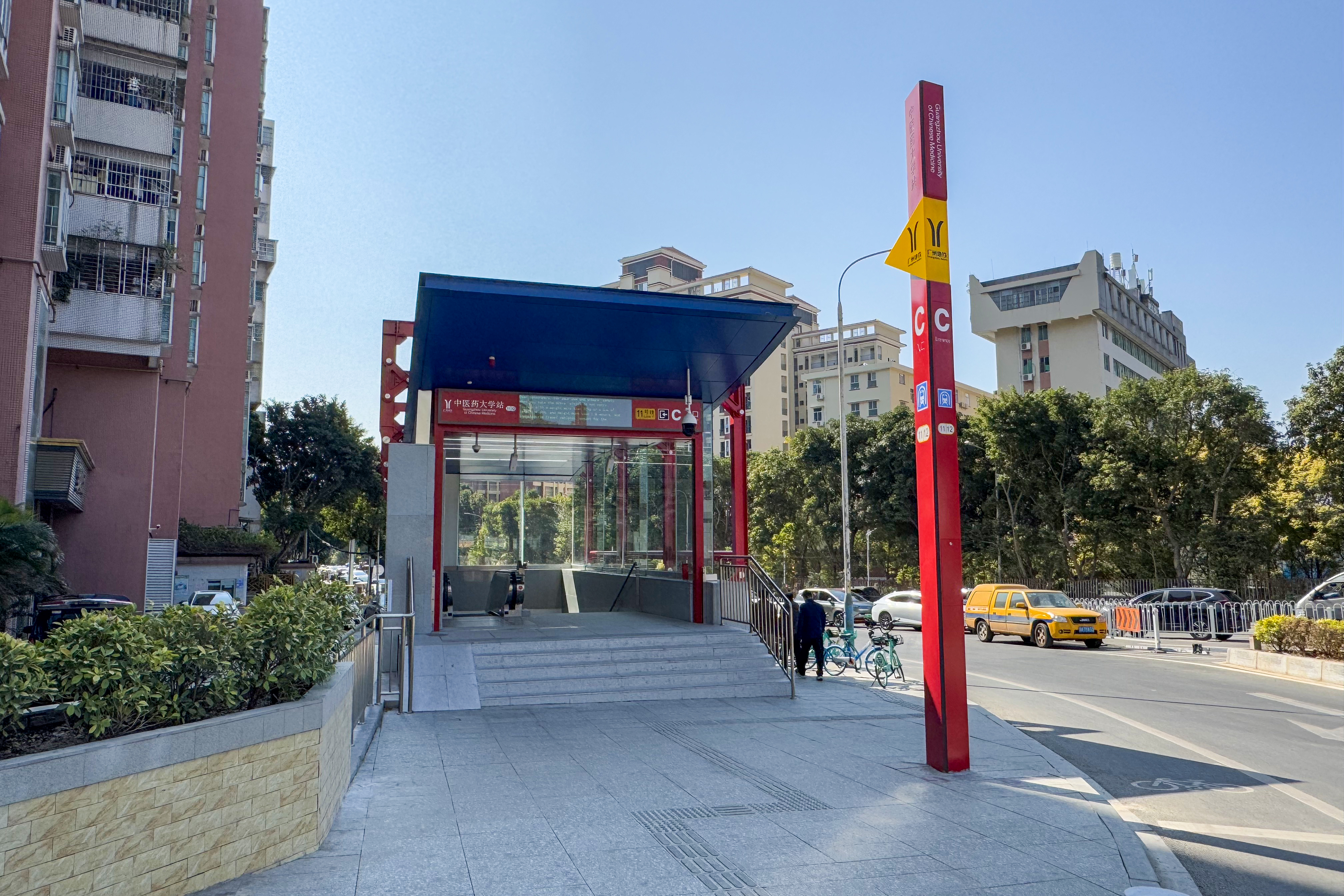
Entrance C

== Gallery ==
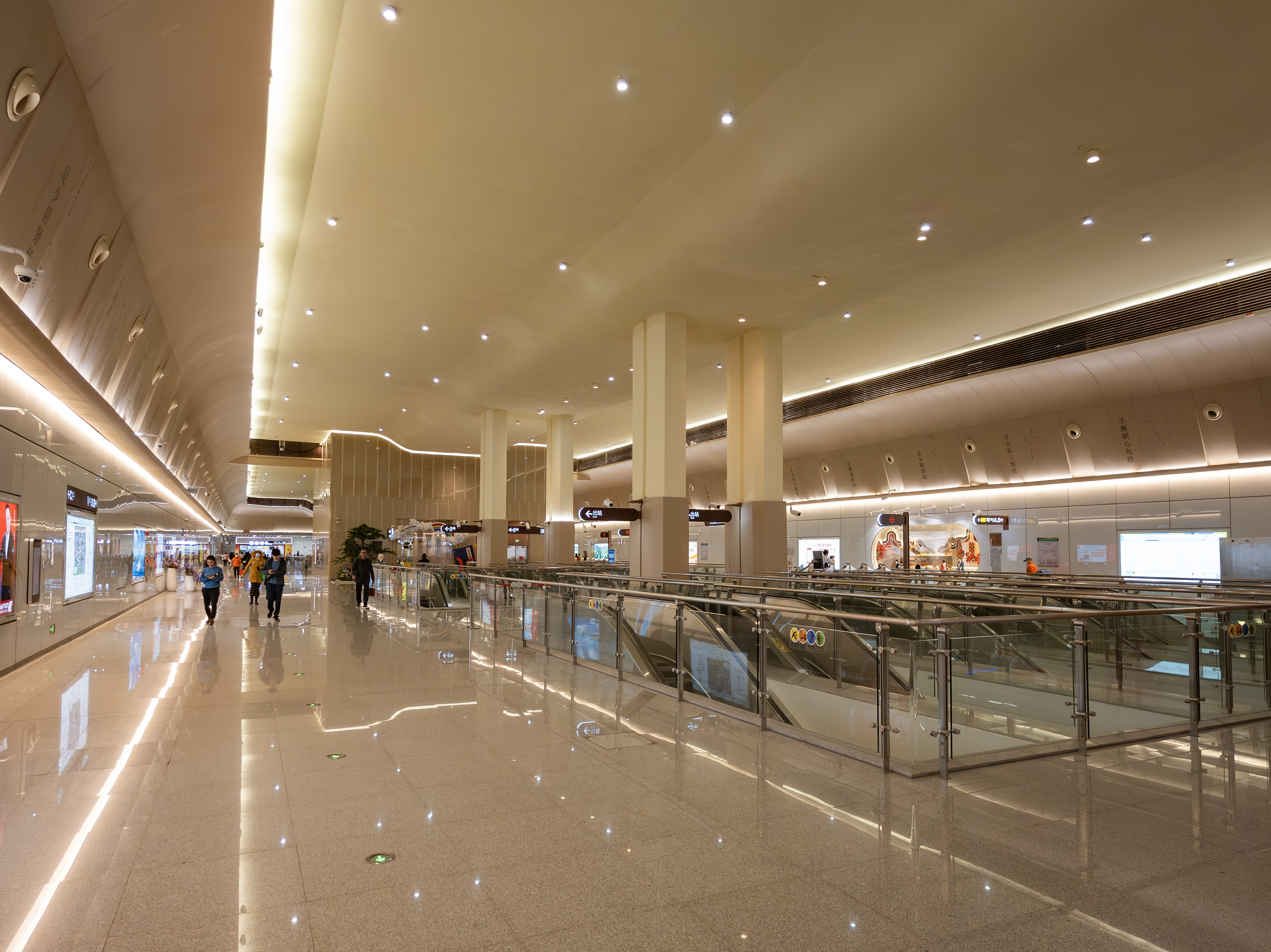
Concourse

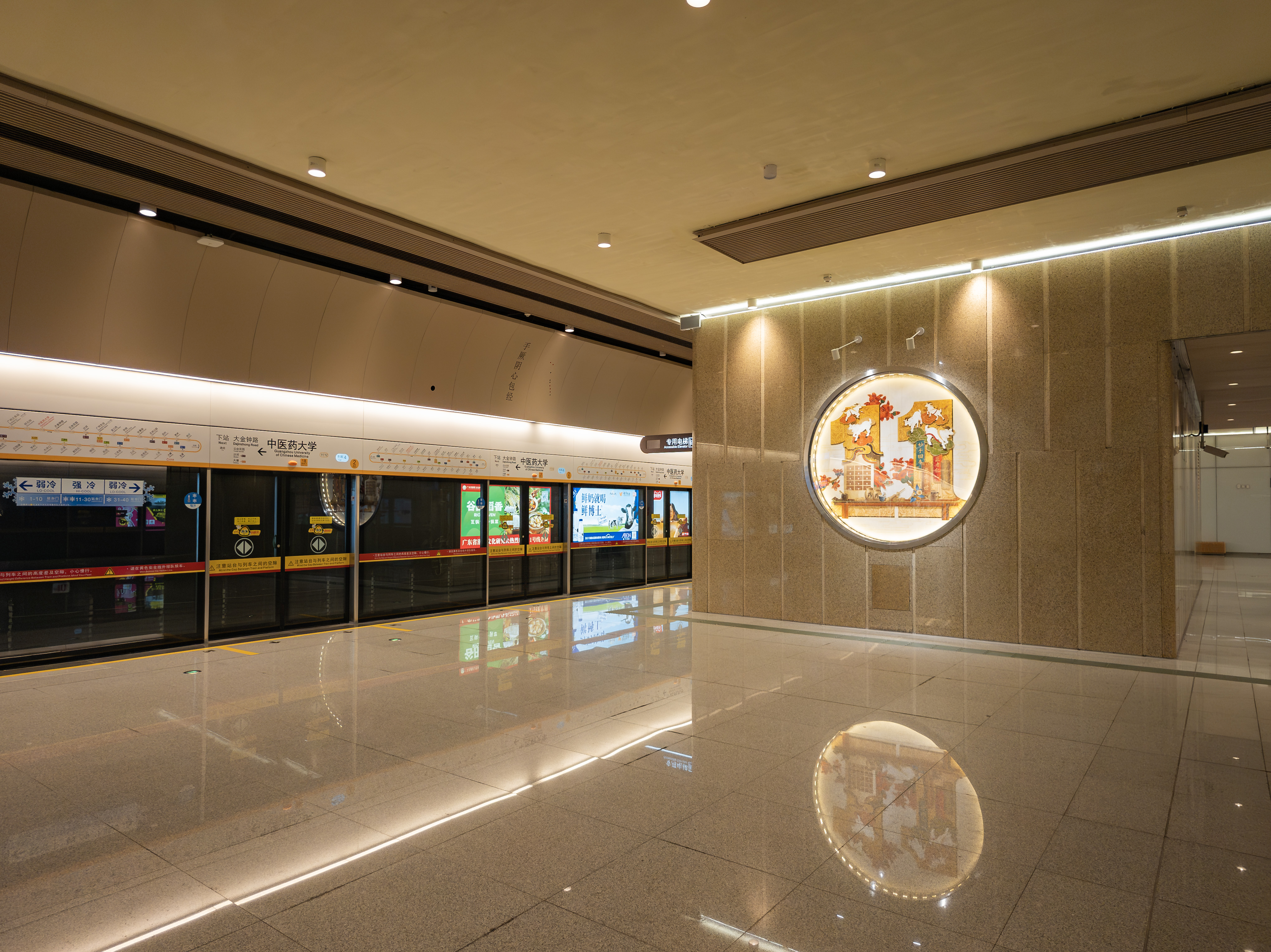
Platform 2 with Twelve Meridians slogan at the top

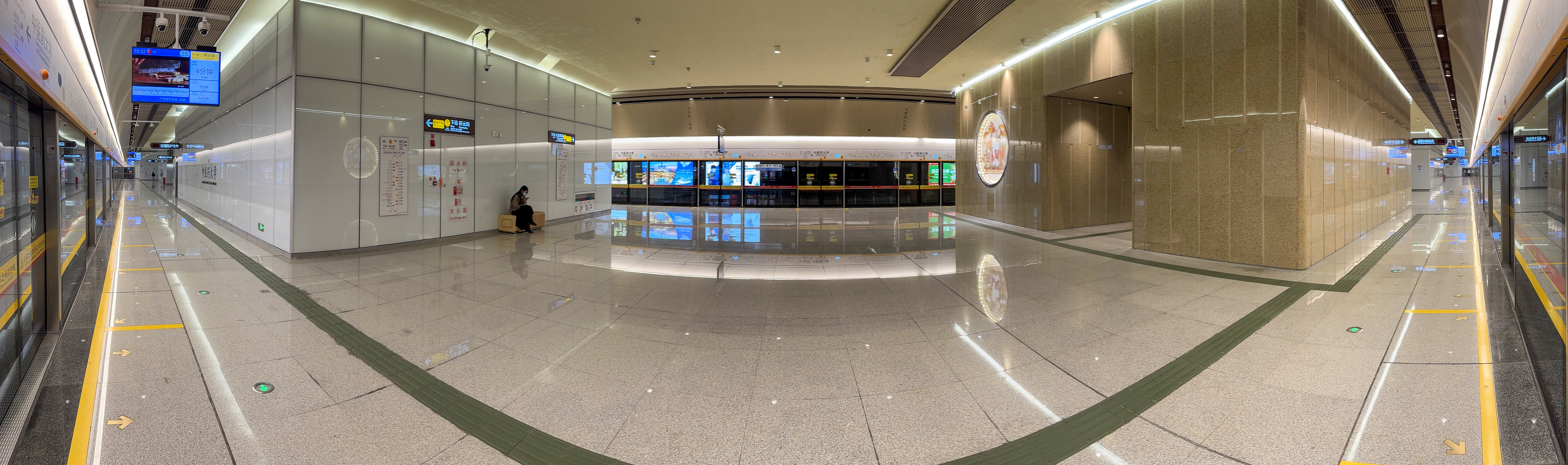
Platform 1 panorama

== History ==
The station was originally planned to be located under Xiatang West Road, but due to the need to demolish the Xiatang West Viaduct and nearby shops, the project was large, so the site was eventually moved west to Guangzhou University of Chinese Medicine. During the planning and construction phase, the station was called Guangyuan Xincun station.

The station was sealed on 10 October 2022 and topped out on 27 April 2023. In June 2023, the preliminary name of the Line 11 stations was announced, and the station is proposed to be named Guangzhou University of Chinese Medicine Station. During the public notice period, the public had a lot of disagreements on the name of the station. Some citizens believed that the station was built with the strong support of Guangzhou University of Chinese Medicine, and that the name "Guangzhou University of Chinese Medicine Station" was more indicative. Others believed that the station was close to Guangyuan New Village and its bus station, and suggested that it be named "Guangyuan Xincun Station". One month later, the Civil Affairs Bureau of Guangzhou issued a statement on soliciting opinions, believing that the station was located within Guangzhou University of Chinese Medicine, and that "Guangzhou University of Chinese Medicine Station" was a clear and accurate indication, while "Guangyuan Xincun" generally referred to the area opposite the station and north of Guangyuan Road Middle, and that names such as "Guangyuan Xincun, Guangyuan" were not appropriate. Finally, in May 2024, Guangzhou Metro applied for the name of the station to be "Guangzhou University of Chinese Medicine station" and was approved.

In September 2024, the station completed the "three rights" transfer. On 28 December, the station was put into use with the opening of Line 11.
