= Guangzhou Gymnasium =

Sports venue in Guangzhou, China

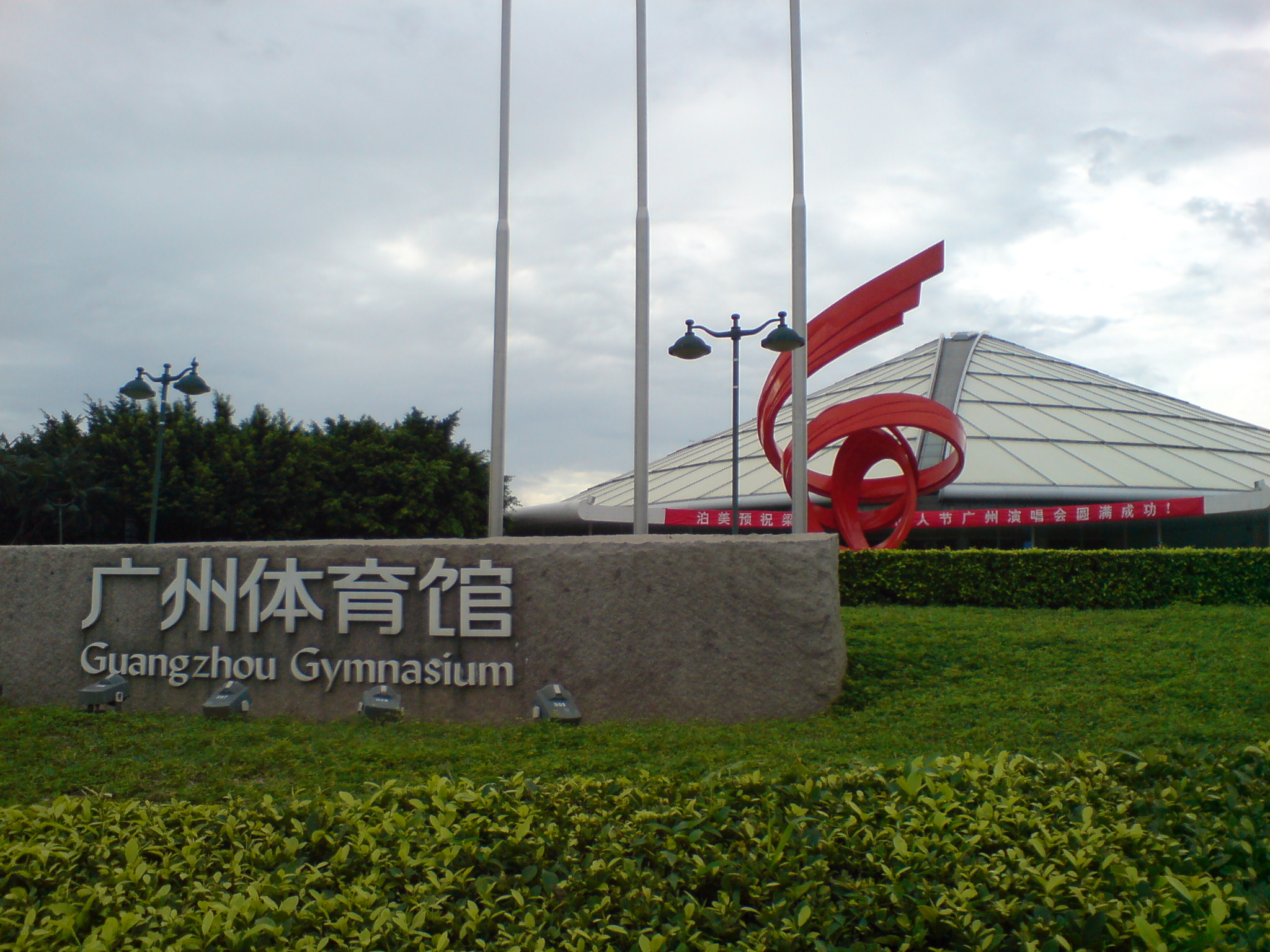
- Interactive map of Guangzhou Gymnasium
- Location: Guangzhou, Guangdong
- Coordinates: 23°11′2″N 113°16′18″E
- Owner: People's Government of Guangzhou
- Capacity: 10,000
- Surface: Flooring
- Public transit: 12 Guangzhou Gymnasium

Construction
- Groundbreaking: 11 February 1999
- Opened: 30 June 2001
- Architect: Paul Andreu

Tenant
- Guangzhou Power (arena football) (folded)

Guangzhou Gymnasium
- Simplified Chinese: 广州体育馆
- Traditional Chinese: 廣州體育館
Transcriptions
Standard Mandarin
- Hanyu Pinyin: Guǎngzhōu Tǐyùguǎn
Yue: Cantonese
- Jyutping: gwong2 zau1 tai2 juk6 gun2

The Guangzhou Gymnasium (Chinese: 广州体育馆; pinyin: Guǎngzhōu Tǐyùguǎn) is an indoor arena in Guangzhou. The arena is used as a concert venue and for sporting events such as arena football, basketball, badminton and table tennis. It was constructed between 11 February 1999 and opened on 30 June 2001, with a seating capacity of 10,000. It was designed by Paul Andreu. it covers an area of 240,000 square meters and has a construction area of nearly 100,000 square meters. It was selected as the 2003 China Construction Engineering Luban Award (National Quality Project). Currently, Guangzhou Gymnasium is one of the main venues for various major sports events, large-scale events, concerts, cultural performances, and conferences and exhibitions in South China.

== Notable events ==
- 2008 World Team Table Tennis Championships
- 2009 Sudirman Cup
- 2010 Asian Games
- 25 September 2010: JJ Lin I AM World Tour
- 2 July 2011: Jolin Tsai《Myself World Tour》 "蔡依林 Myself世界巡迴演唱會"
- 2 March 2012: Greatest Hits Tour - Westlife
- 30 June 2012: 2012 Shinhwa Grand Tour in China: The Return - the comeback concert of South Korean boy band Shinhwa, after a four-year hiatus due to mandatory military service.
- 20 April 2013: Show Lo's Show 2013 《Over the limit》 World Live Tour "羅志祥 無極限 演唱會"
- 10 August 2013: S.H.E《2gether 4ever World Tour》
- 19 December 2015: T-ara Great China Tour
- 18 June 2016: Got7 《Fly World Tour》
- 19 October 2017 – 22 October 2017: Quarterfinals for the 2017 League of Legends World championship
- 16 June 2019: Boyzone 《Thank You & Goodnight Tour》
- 2019 FIBA World Cup Group C (Spain, Iran, Puerto Rico and Tunisia)
- 2025 National Games of the People's Republic of China (U-18 volleyball and trampoline gymnastics)

== See also ==
- List of indoor arenas in China
