= Keziling station =

Guangzhou Metro Line 12 station under construction

Keziling 柯子岭

Chinese name
- Simplified Chinese: 柯子岭站
- Traditional Chinese: 柯子嶺站
Transcriptions
Standard Mandarin
- Hanyu Pinyin: Kēzǐlǐng Zhàn
Yue: Cantonese
- Yale Romanization: Ōjílíhng Jaahm
- Jyutping: O^{1}zi^{2}ling^{5} Zaam^{6}

General information
- Location: South side of the intersection of Baiyun Avenue South (白云大道南) and Jinyun Road (景云路); Jingtai Subdistrict, Baiyun District, Guangzhou, Guangdong; China
- Coordinates: 23°9′57.64″N 113°16′1.45″E
- Operated by: Guangzhou Metro Co. Ltd.
- Line: Line 12
- Platforms: 2 (1 island platform)
- Tracks: 2

Construction
- Structure type: Underground
- Accessible: Yes

Other information
- Station code: 1211

History
- Opened: December 2026 (7 months' time) (expected)
- Previous names: Jinyun Road (景云路)

Services
Preceding station	Guangzhou Metro	Following station
Future services (2026)
Jingtai towards Xunfenggang	Line 12	Guangzhou University of Chinese Medicine towards Higher Education Mega Center South
Location

Keziling station (Chinese: 柯子岭站; pinyin: Kēzǐlǐng Zhàn; Cantonese Yale: Ōjílíhng Jaahm) is a station under construction on Line 12 of the Guangzhou Metro. It is located underground south of the intersection of Baiyun Avenue South and Jinyun Road, in Guangzhou's Baiyun District. The station is expected to open in 2026.

== Station layout ==
This station is a two-story underground station. The ground level is the station entrance and exit. The first floor is the concourse, and the second floor is the platform for Line 12.

G	-	Exits
L1; Concourse	Lobby	Ticket Machines, Customer Service, Shops, Police Station, Security Facilities
L2; Platforms	Platform 2	12 towards Xunfenggang (Jingtai)
L2; Platforms	Island platform, doors will open on the left (Toilets, Nursery)
L2; Platforms	Platform 1	12 towards Higher Education Mega Center South (Guangzhou University of Chinese Medicine)

=== Concourse ===
There are automatic ticket machines and an AI customer service center at the concourse. There are elevators, escalators, and stairs in the fare-paid area for passengers to reach the platform.

=== Platform ===
The station has an island platform located under Baiyun Avenue South.

== History ==
The station was called Keziling station in the early planning stage, and after Line 12 was approved, the station was renamed to Jingyun Road station. Later, under the impetus of the National People's Congress and members of the Chinese People's Political Consultative Conference, the authorities planned to restore "Keziling" as the official station name for the station. In May 2025, the name of the station changed back to Keziling station.

The station began enclosure construction in May 2019.
