= Yuntai Garden station =

Guangzhou Metro Line 11 station

Yuntai Garden 云台花园
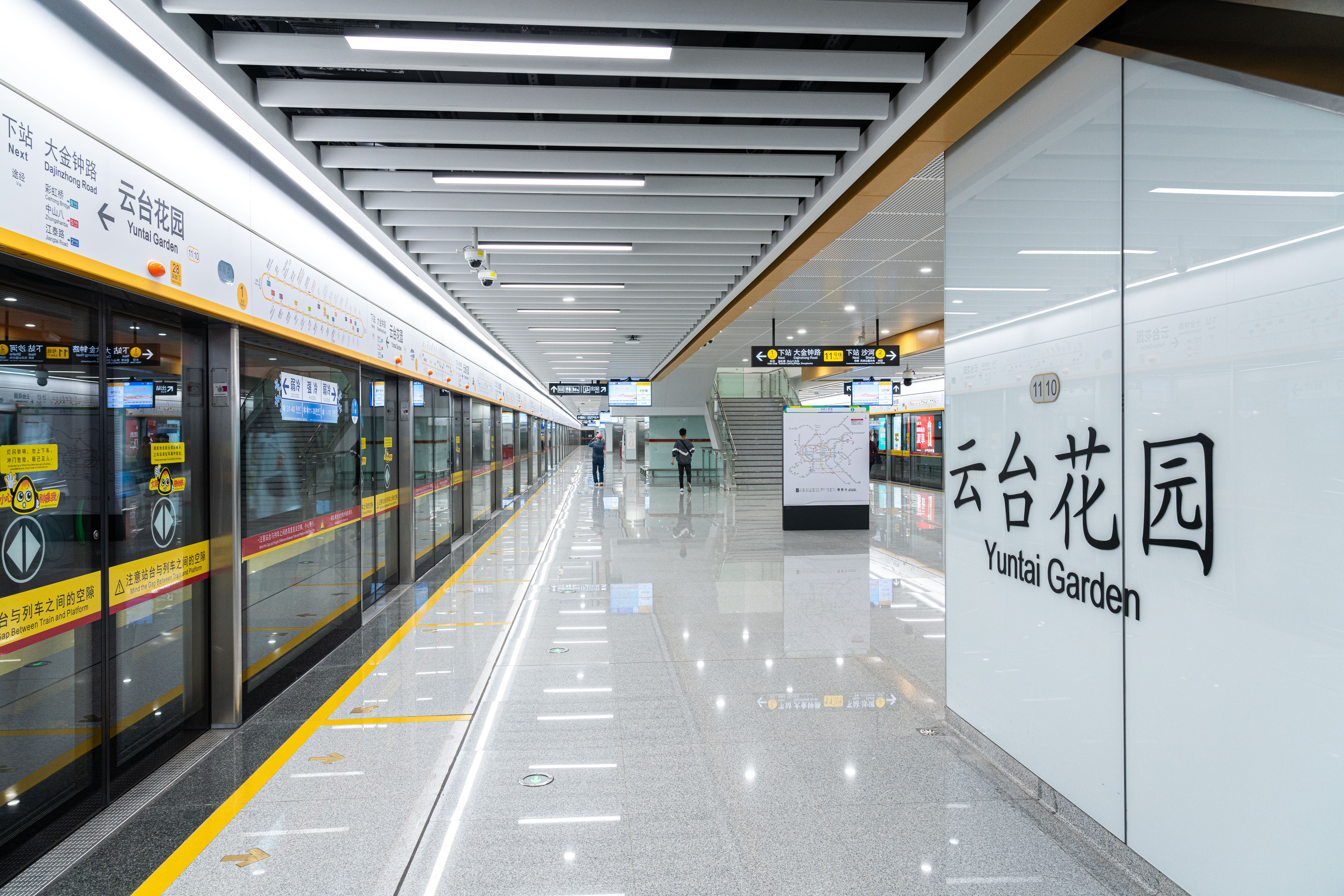
- Platform

Chinese name
- Simplified Chinese: 云台花园站
- Traditional Chinese: 雲台花園站
Transcriptions
Standard Mandarin
- Hanyu Pinyin: Yúntáihuāyuán Zhàn
Yue: Cantonese
- Yale Romanization: Wàntòifāyùn Jaahm
- Jyutping: Wan^{4}toi^{4}faa^{1}jyun^{4} Zaam^{6}

General information
- Location: Outside the intersection of Guangyuan Road Middle (广园中路) and Luhu Road (麓湖路), Dengfeng Subdistrict; Yuexiu District, Guangzhou, Guangdong; China
- Coordinates: 23°9′23.76″N 113°17′13.38″E
- Operator: Guangzhou Metro Co. Ltd.
- Line: Line 11
- Platforms: 2 (1 island platform)
- Tracks: 2

Construction
- Structure type: Underground
- Accessible: Yes

Other information
- Station code: 1110

History
- Opened: 28 December 2024 (19 months ago)

Services
Preceding station	Guangzhou Metro	Following station
Dajinzhong Road Outer Circle	Line 11	Shahe Inner Circle
Location

Yuntai Garden Station (simplified Chinese: 云台花园站; traditional Chinese: 雲台花園站; pinyin: Yúntáihuāyuán Zhàn; Cantonese Yale: Wàntòifāyùn Jaahm) is a station on Line 11 of the Guangzhou Metro. It started operations on 28 December 2024. It is located underground outside the intersection of Guangyuan Road Middle and Luhu Road in Yuexiu District.

== Station Layout ==
G	-	Exits A, C1, C2, E
L1	Lobby	Ticket Machines, Customer Service, Shops, Police Station, Security Facilities, Restroom, Baby Care
L2; Platforms	Platform 1	11 Outer Circle (Dajinzhong Road)
L2; Platforms	Island platform, doors will open on the left (Toilets, Nursery)
L2; Platforms	Platform 2	11 Inner Circle (Shahe)

=== Entrances/exits ===
The station has 4 points of entry/exit. Exit A is equipped with an elevator.

- A: Guangyuan Road Middle, Yuntai Garden, Yunluo Biological Garden, Baiyun Mountain South Gate
- C1: Guangyuan Road Middle, Yuntai Garden, Yunluo Biological Garden, Baiyun Mountain South Gate
- C2: Guangyuan Road Middle, Yuntai Garden, Yunluo Biological Garden, Baiyun Mountain South Gate, Baiyun Mountain Ropeway
- E: Luhu Road, Luhu Park, Affiliated Cancer Hospital and Institute of Guangzhou Medical University, Guangzhou Chest Hospital
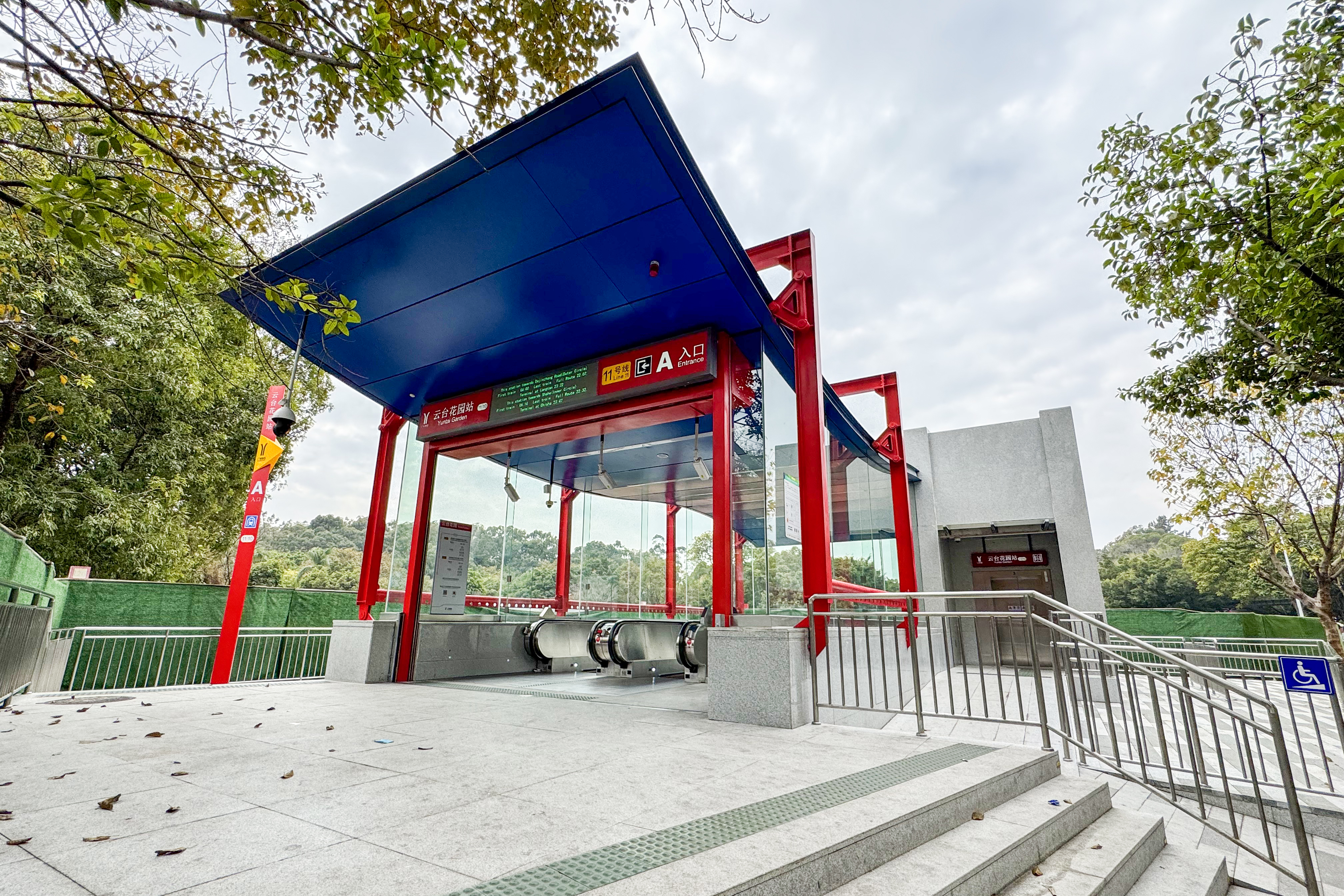
Entrance A

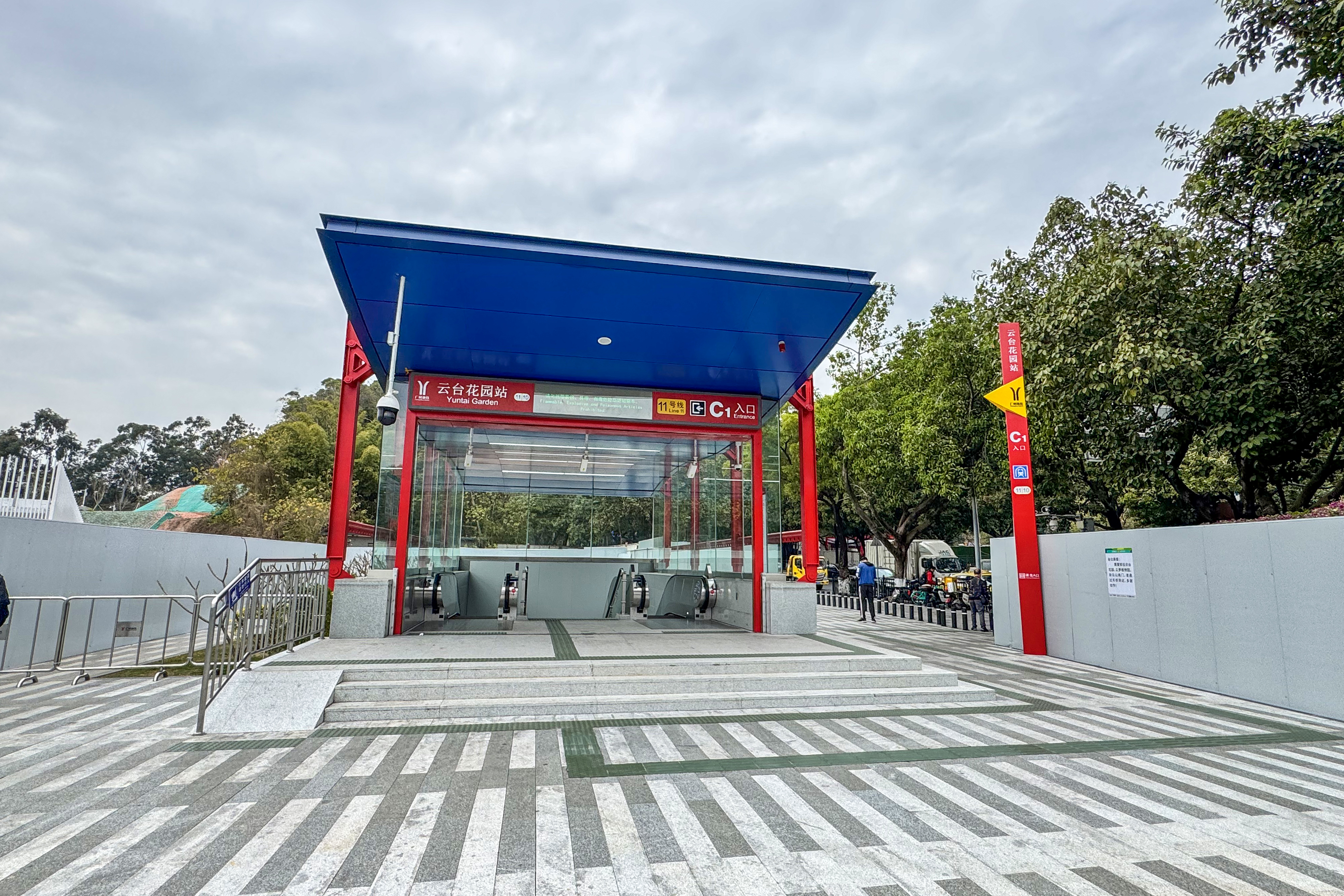
Entrance C1

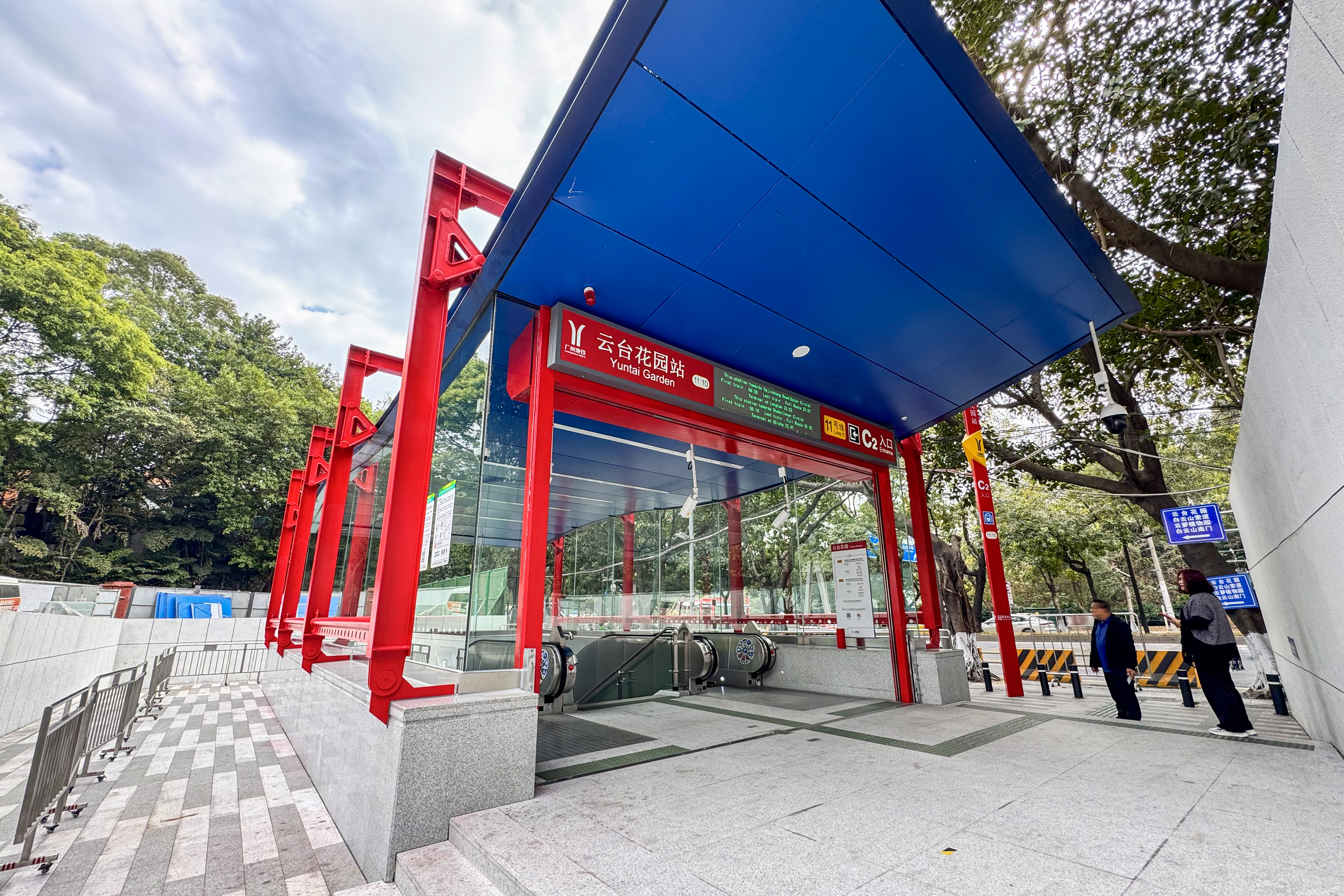
Entrance C2

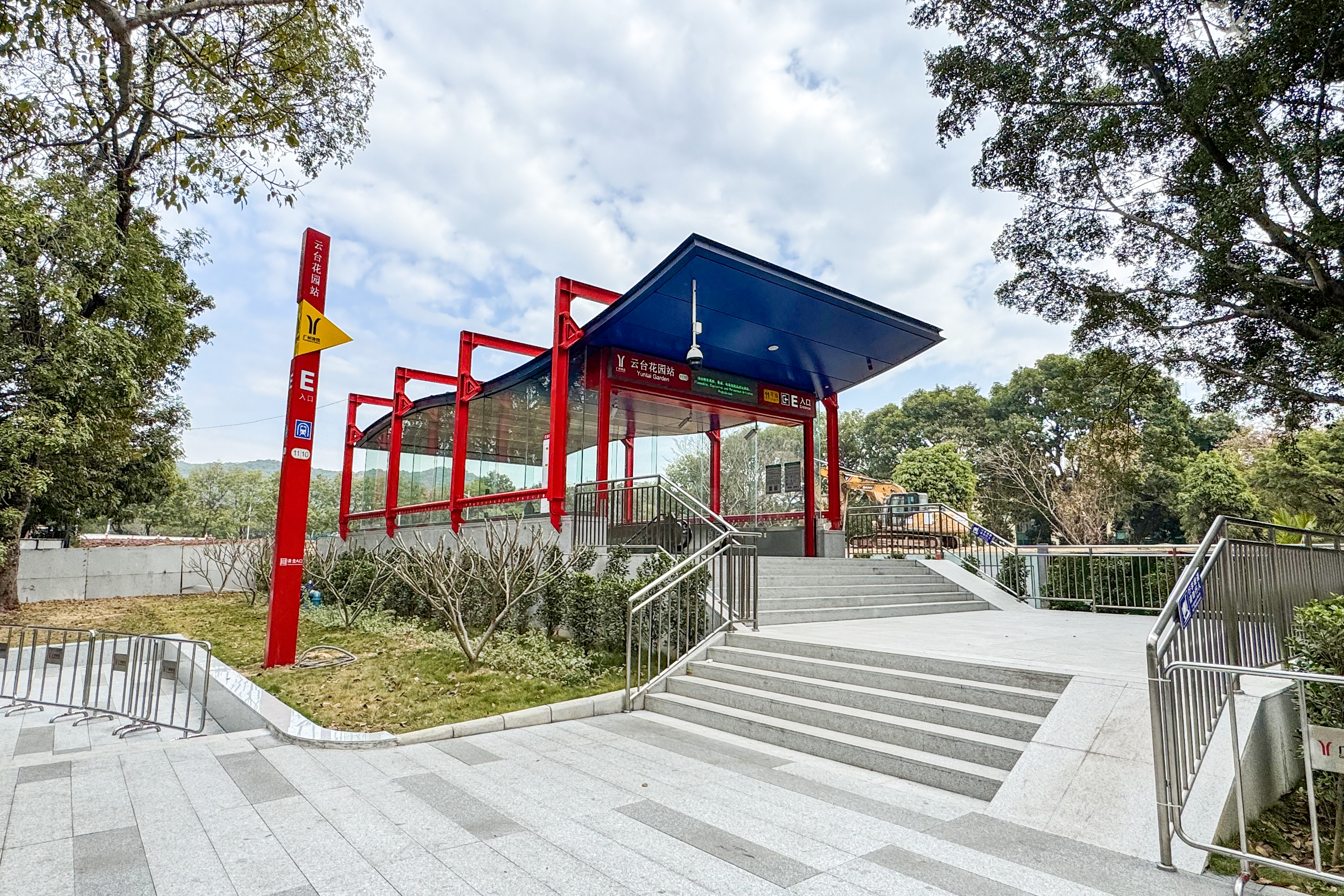
Entrance E

== Gallery ==
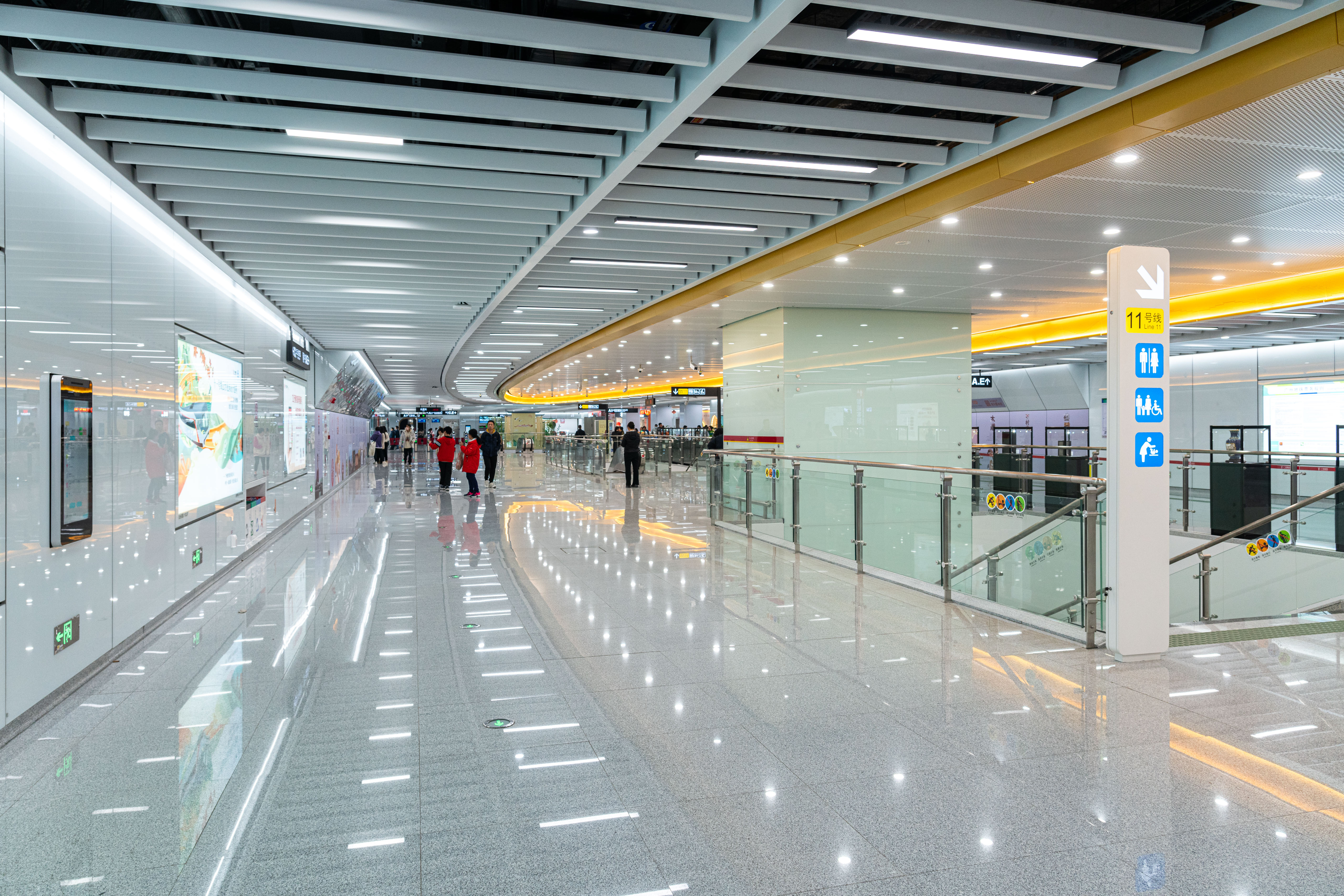
Concourse

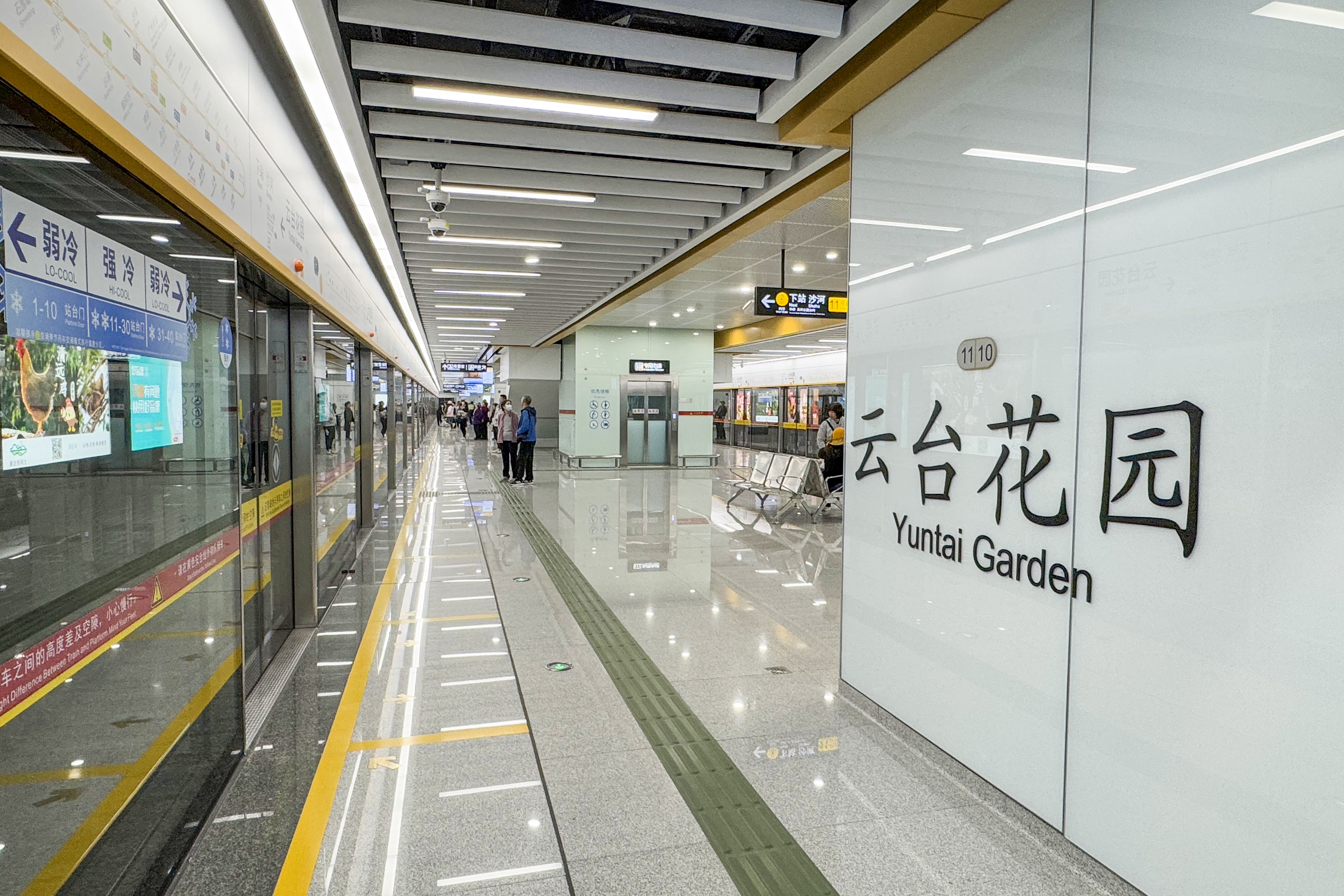
Platform 2 (Inner Circle platform)

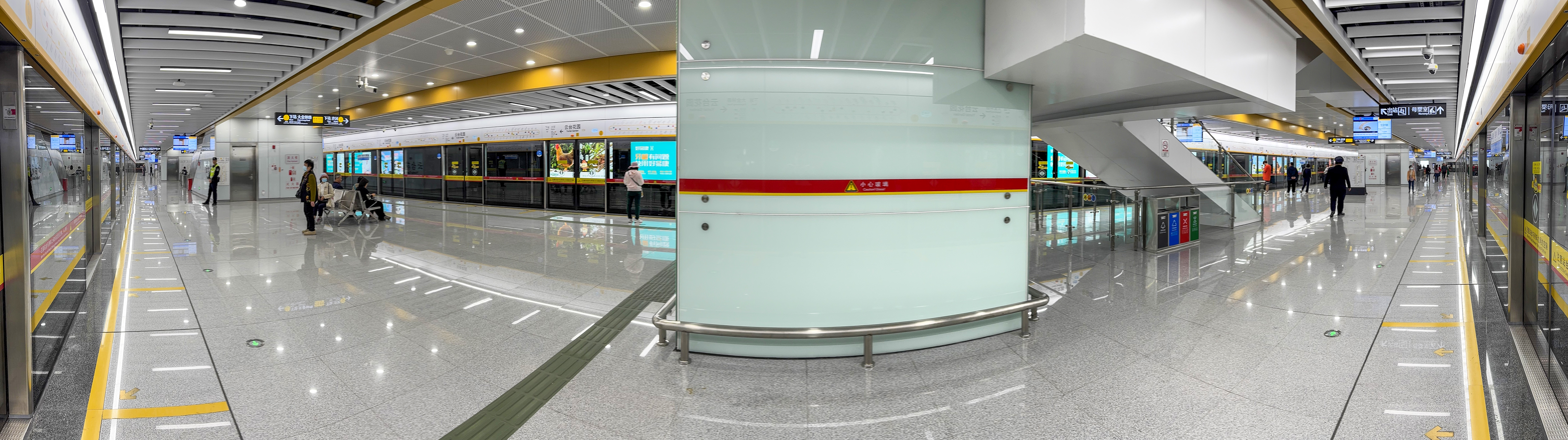
Platform 1 panorama

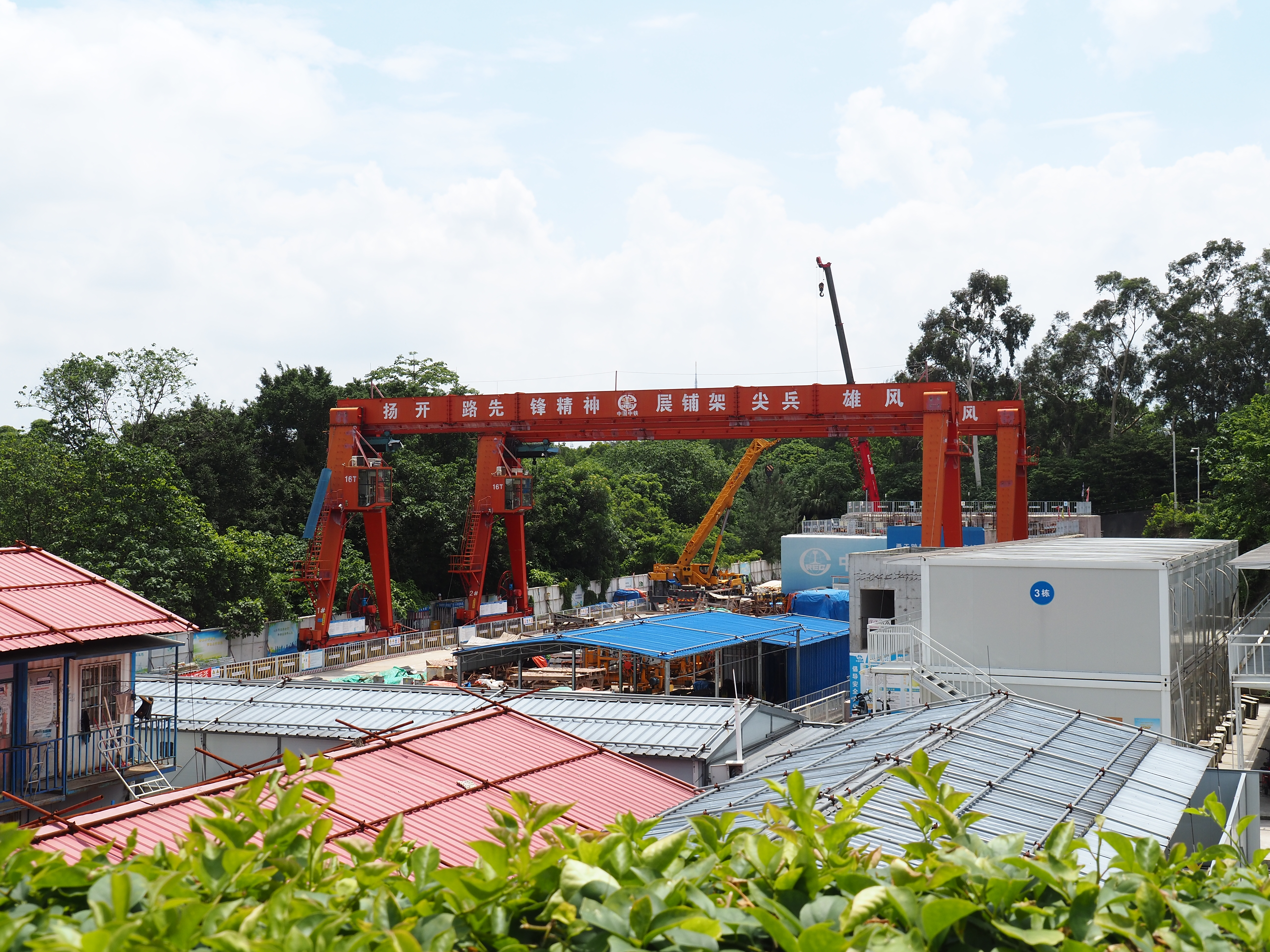
Station site (May 2023)

== Usage ==
This station is the closest metro station to Yuntai Garden and Baiyun Mountain Scenic Area, attracting a large number of tourists to and from the scenic spot. In the early days of the opening of Line 11, Yuntai Garden Station was the station with the highest number of people entering the station.

== History ==
In 2010, the station appeared on Line 11 in the plan and was finally implemented, and the initial plan was to set up at the main entrance of Yuntai Garden. During the EIA announcement of Line 11, the proximity of the station to Baiyun Mountain, and the need to cross Baiyun Mountain between the station and Dajinzhong Road Station, caused concern among citizens and environmental groups. In order to reduce the impact of the subway on Baiyun Mountain, Line 11 adjusted the original Baiyun Mountain base section to the south to cross under Guangyuan Road in the follow-up planning, and the location of the station was also moved 150 meters south from the main entrance of Yuntai Garden to the bottom of Guangyuan Road.

The station entered the substantive construction phase on 5 March 2017, and the diaphragm wall construction was completed on 12 November 2018. On 28 November 2019, the main structure of the station was topped out, making it the first topped-out station on Line 11. On 3 July 2024, the site completed the "three rights" transfer. On 28 December 2024, the station was put into use with the opening of Line 11.
