= Jingtai station (Guangzhou Metro) =

Guangzhou Metro Line 12 station under construction

Jingtai 景泰

Chinese name
- Chinese: 景泰站
Transcriptions
Standard Mandarin
- Hanyu Pinyin: Jǐngtài Zhàn
Yue: Cantonese
- Yale Romanization: Gíngtaai Jaahm
- Jyutping: Ging^{2}taai^{4} Zaam^{6}

General information
- Location: Intersection of Baiyun Avenue South (白云大道南) and Jinxin Road (金信路); Jingtai Subdistrict, Baiyun District, Guangzhou, Guangdong; China
- Coordinates: 23°10′36.88″N 113°16′12.97″E
- Operated by: Guangzhou Metro Co. Ltd.
- Line: Line 12
- Platforms: 2 (1 island platform)
- Tracks: 2

Construction
- Structure type: Underground
- Accessible: Yes

Other information
- Station code: 1210

History
- Opened: December 2026 (7 months' time) (expected)
- Previous names: Xiaojinzhong (小金钟)

Services
Preceding station	Guangzhou Metro	Following station
Future services (2026)
Guangzhou Gymnasium towards Xunfenggang	Line 12	Keziling towards Higher Education Mega Center South
Location

Jingtai station (Chinese: 景泰站; pinyin: Jǐngtài Zhàn; Cantonese Yale: Gíngtaai Jaahm) is a station under construction on Line 12 of the Guangzhou Metro. It is located underground beneath the intersection of Baiyun Avenue South and Jinxin Road, in Guangzhou's Baiyun District. The station is expected to open in 2026.

== Station layout ==
This station is a two-story underground station. The ground level is the station entrance and exit. The first floor is the concourse, and the second floor is the platform for Line 12. The platform is 302.1 meters long.

G	-	Exits
L1; Concourse	Lobby	Ticket Machines, Customer Service, Shops, Police Station, Security Facilities
L2; Platforms	Platform 2	12 towards Xunfenggang (Guangzhou Gymnasium)
L2; Platforms	Island platform, doors will open on the left (Toilets, Nursery)
L2; Platforms	Platform 1	12 towards Higher Education Mega Center South (Keziling)

=== Concourse ===
There are automatic ticket machines and an AI customer service center at the concourse. There are elevators, escalators, and stairs in the fare-paid area for passengers to reach the platform.

=== Platform ===
The station has an island platform located under Baiyun Avenue South.

In addition, there is a storage track at the north end of the platform that extends to Guangzhou Gymnasium station.

== History ==
During the planning and construction phase, the station was named Xiaojinzhong station. In May 2025, it was renamed Jingtai station.

The roof slab was sealed on 10 December 2024.
