= Line 12 (Guangzhou Metro) =

Metro line in Guangzhou, China

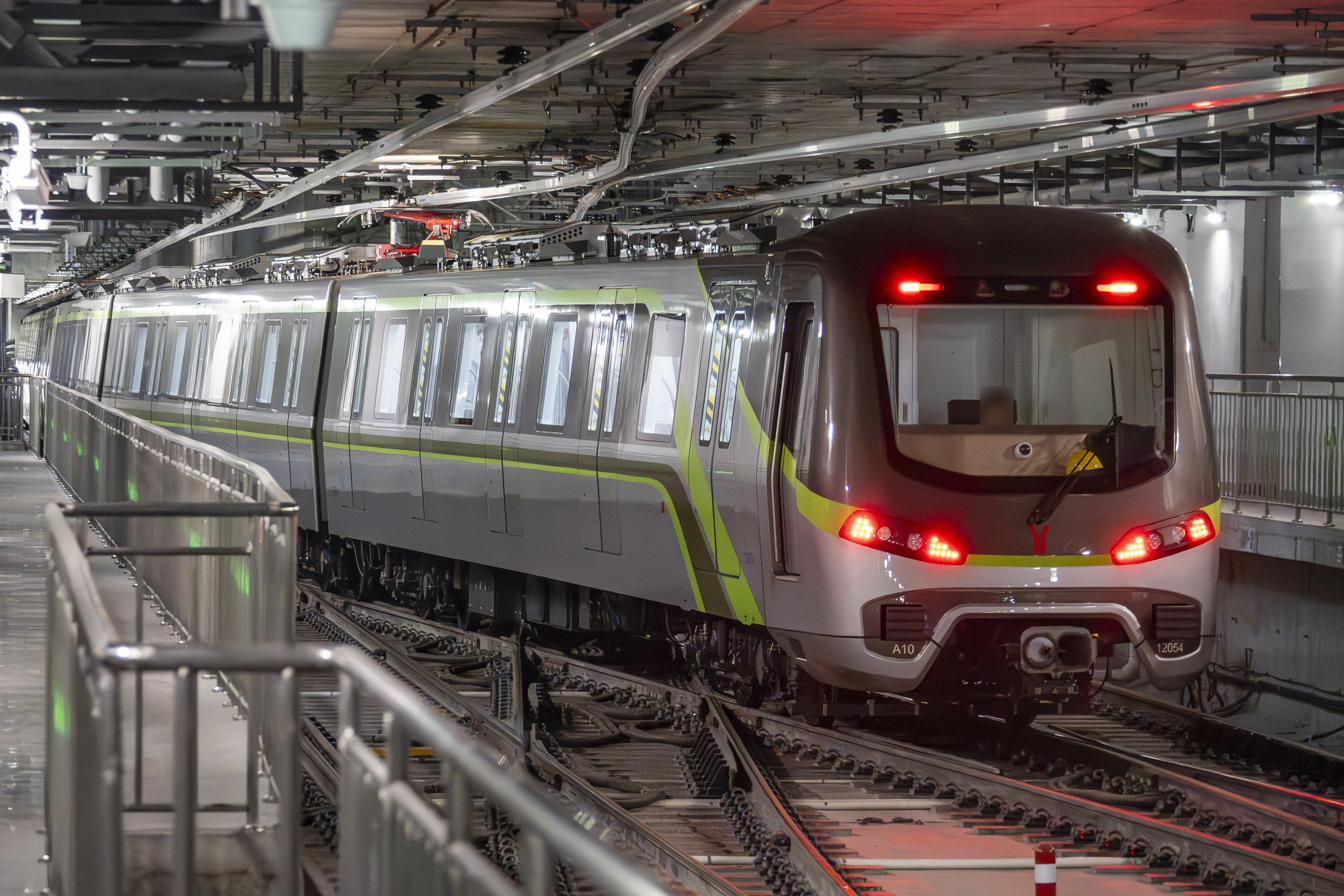
- Line 12 train at Xunfenggang station

Overview
- Status: In operation
- Owner: City of Guangzhou
- Locale: Baiyun, Yuexiu, Haizhu and Panyu districts Guangzhou, Guangdong
- Termini: Xunfenggang; Higher Education Mega Center South
- Stations: 18 as of 13 February 2026; 7 under construction

Service
- Type: Rapid transit
- System: Guangzhou Metro
- Services: 2; East and West
- Operator: Guangzhou Metro Corporation
- Daily ridership: 169,900 (2025)

History
- Opened: 29 June 2025; 16 months ago

Technical
- Line length: 37.6 km (23.36 mi)
- Track gauge: 1,435 mm (4 ft 8 1/2 in)
- Operating speed: 80 km/h (49.71 mph)

Line 12 of the Guangzhou Metro (Chinese: 广州地铁12号线) is a 27.9 km (17.34 mi) fully automated rapid transit line in Guangzhou, China. It currently operates as 2 separate services, with a western and eastern section. The 9-station western section between Xunfenggang and Guangzhou Gymnasium and the 9-station eastern section between Ersha Island and Higher Education Mega Center South except Chigang opened on 29 June 2025, while the middle section between Guangzhou Gymnasium and Ersha Island is still under construction. Chigang station opened on 13 February 2026.

== History ==
The line was proposed as part of the Guangzhou Urban Rail Transit Phase 3 Construction Plan in 2016, which received approval from the National Development and Reform Commission on 23 March 2017. It was slated to run 37.6 kilometres (23.4 mi) between Xunfenggang and Higher Education Mega Center South, with 25 stations in total. Construction would start in 2018, with a planned completion date in 2023 and an estimated total cost of ¥35.12b.

Construction officially began in November 2018. The first tunnel section was completed in June 2021, between Xunfenggang and Xunfenggang North stations. At this time the line was said to be 23% complete, with the main structure complete at 3 stations. As construction was not progressing well (38% complete by the end of February 2022), a one-year delay was announced in March 2022, pushing the expected completion date into 2024. Track laying started in July 2022.

The first station (Guanzhou) passed acceptance inspection in July 2024. By this time it had become clear construction progress had formed clear splits at Guangzhou Gymnasium and Ersha Island, forming three sections: west, central and east. In November 2024, train testing had commenced on the eastern section, however elsewhere 3 stations were still under construction and 5 tunnel boring machines were still boring. Train testing also commenced on the western section in December 2024.

The western and eastern sections were opened together on 29 June 2025. Construction remains ongoing on the central section, which was delayed due to difficulties with land acquisition at Jianshe 6th Road and relocation of utilities. Track laying commenced in this section in July 2025.

=== Opening timeline ===
Segment	Commencement	Length	Station(s)	Name
Xunfenggang — Guangzhou Gymnasium	29 June 2025	27.9 km (17.34 mi)	9	West section
Ersha Island — Higher Education Mega Center South	29 June 2025	27.9 km (17.34 mi)	8	East section
Chigang	13 February 2026	Infill station	1	East section
Guangzhou Gymnasium — Ersha Island	December 2026 (expected)	9.7 km (6.03 mi)	7	Middle section

== Stations ==
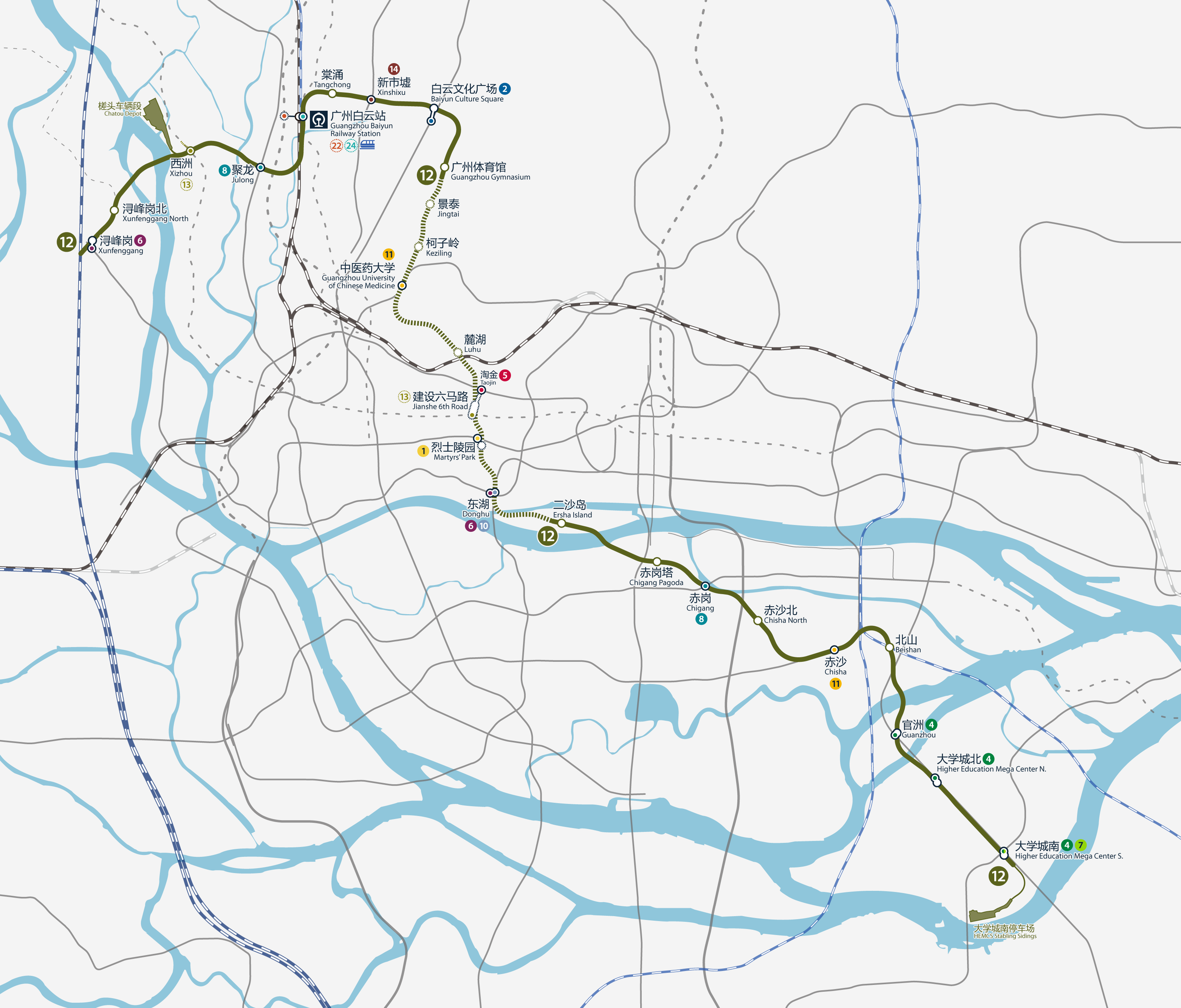
Map of Line 12

Legend

- Stations under construction

Station №	Station name		Connections	Future Connections	Location
Station №	English	Chinese	Connections	Future Connections	Location
1201	Xunfenggang	浔峰岗	6 601		Baiyun
1202	Xunfenggang North	浔峰岗北			Baiyun
1203	Xizhou	西洲		13 1304	Baiyun
1204	Julong	聚龙	8 806		Baiyun
1205	Guangzhou Baiyun Railway Station	广州白云站	GBA GQ	22 24	Baiyun
1206	Tangchong	棠涌			Baiyun
1207	Xinshixu	新市墟	14 1404		Baiyun
1208	Baiyun Culture Square	白云文化广场	2 220		Baiyun
1209	Guangzhou Gymnasium	广州体育馆			Baiyun
1210	Jingtai	景泰			Baiyun
1211	Keziling	柯子岭			Baiyun
1212	Guangzhou University of Chinese Medicine	中医药大学	11 1112		Baiyun
1213	Luhu Lake	麓湖			Yuexiu
1214	Jianshe 6th Road	建设六马路	Taojin: 5 508	13 1312	Yuexiu
1215	Martyrs' Park	烈士陵园	1 111		Yuexiu
1216	Donghu	东湖	6 613 10 1010		Yuexiu
1217	Ersha Island	二沙岛			Yuexiu
1218	Chigang Pagoda	赤岗塔		28	Haizhu
1219	Chigang	赤岗	8 824		Haizhu
1220	Chisha North	赤沙北			Haizhu
1221	Chisha	赤沙	11 1101		Haizhu
1222	Beishan	北山			Haizhu
1223	Guanzhou	官洲	4 420		Haizhu
1224	Higher Education Mega Center North	大学城北	4 419		Panyu
1225	Higher Education Mega Center South	大学城南	4 418 7 709		Panyu

== Rolling stock ==
Line 12 uses GoA4 fully automated, 6-car type A trains with a maximum speed of 80 km/h.
