= Hengsha station =

Guangzhou Metro station

Coordinates: 23.158187°N 113.206791°E

Hengsha 橫沙
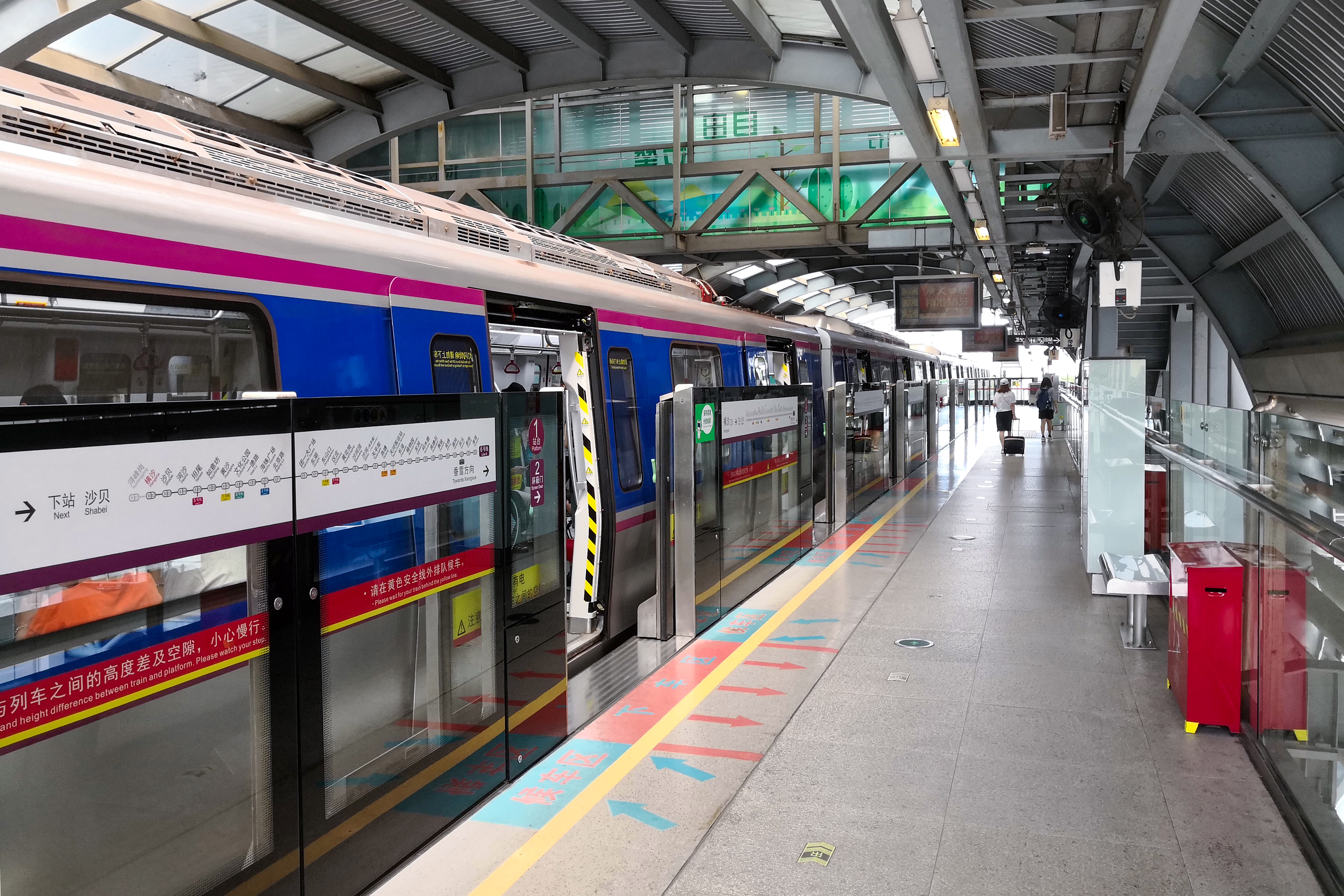
- Platform 1

Chinese name
- Simplified Chinese: 横沙站
- Traditional Chinese: 橫沙站
Transcriptions
Standard Mandarin
- Hanyu Pinyin: Héngshā Zhàn
Yue: Cantonese
- Jyutping: waang^{4}saa^{1} zaam^{6}

General information
- Location: Jinshazhou Road (金沙洲路) and Huanzhou Third Road (环洲三路); Jinshazhou, Baiyun District, Guangzhou, Guangdong; China
- Operated by: Guangzhou Metro Co. Ltd.
- Line: Line 6
- Platforms: 2 (2 side platforms)

Construction
- Structure type: Elevated

Other information
- Station code: 602

History
- Opened: 28 December 2013; 12 years ago

Services
Preceding station	Guangzhou Metro	Following station
Xunfenggang Terminus	Line 6	Shabei towards Xiangxue
Location

Hengsha Station (simplified Chinese: 横沙站; traditional Chinese: 橫沙站) is an elevated station on Line 6 of the Guangzhou Metro. The station is located at Jinshazhou Road (金沙洲路) Hengsha Section on the island of Jinshazhou in the Baiyun District of Guangzhou. It started operation on 28 December 2013.

== Station layout ==
F4	-	Passageway between Platforms 1 & 2
F3; Platforms	North Lobby	Customer Service, Vending machines
F3; Platforms	Side platform, doors will open on the right
F3; Platforms	Platform 2	6 towards Xunfenggang (Terminus)
F3; Platforms	Platform 1	6 towards Xiangxue (Shabei)
F3; Platforms	Side platform, doors will open on the right
F3; Platforms	South Lobby	Customer Service, Vending machines
F2; Buffer Area	Buffer Area	Buffer area of South Lobby, Station equipment
F2; Buffer Area	Pedestrian Overpass	Passageway between North & South Lobbies
G Concourse	-	Exits, Station equipment, Shops, Toilet

== Exits ==
Exit number	Exit location
Exit A	Jinshazhou Lu
Exit B	Jinshazhou Lu
Exit C	Jinshazhou Lu
