= Hesha station =

Guangzhou Metro station

Coordinates: 23.135576°N 113.217405°E

Hesha 河沙
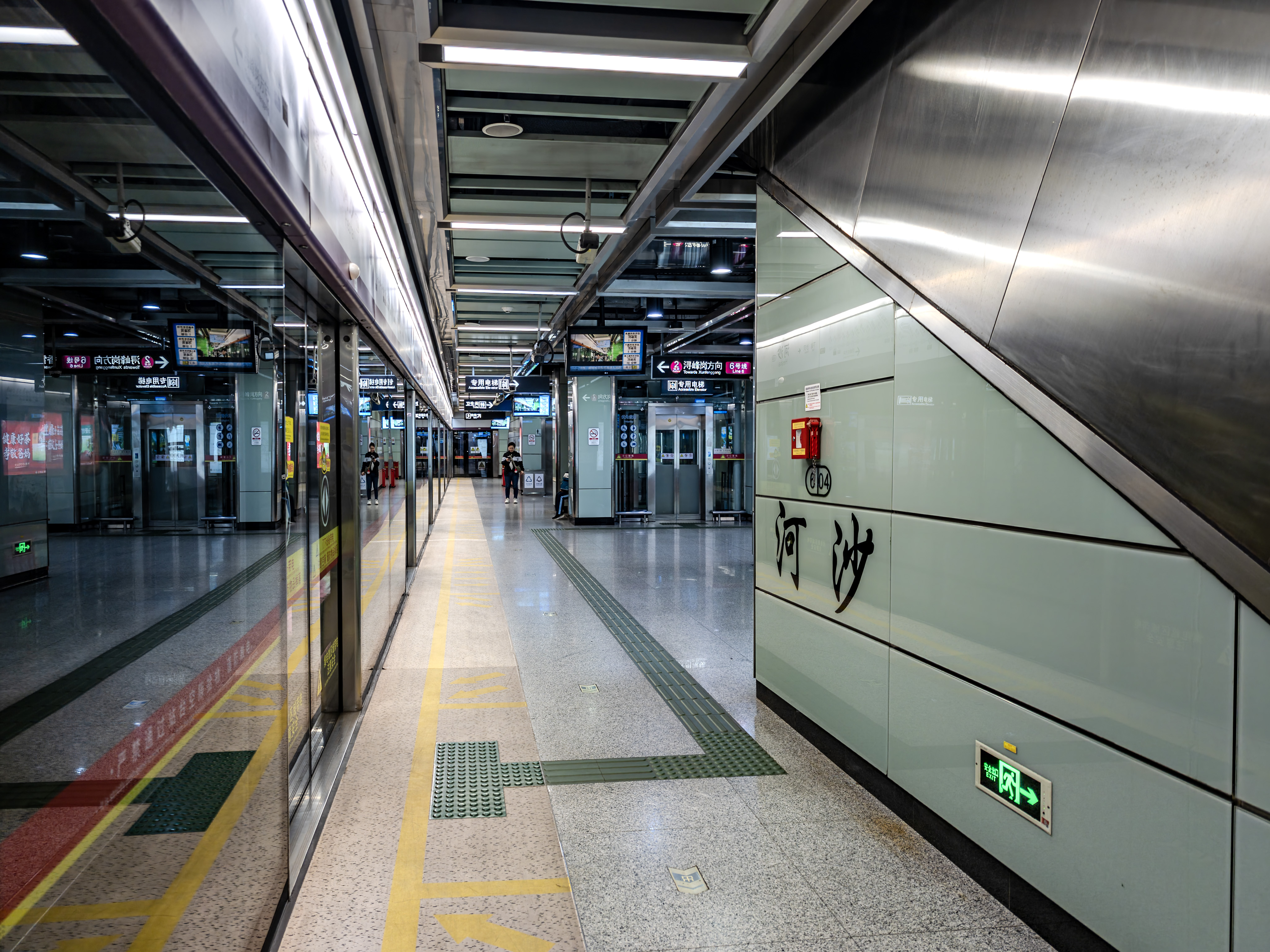

General information
- Location: Liwan District, Guangzhou, Guangdong; China
- Operated by: Guangzhou Metro Co. Ltd.
- Line: Line 6
- Platforms: 2 (1 island platform)

Construction
- Structure type: Underground

Other information
- Station code: 604

History
- Opened: 28 December 2013; 12 years ago

Services
Preceding station	Guangzhou Metro	Following station
Shabei towards Xunfenggang	Line 6	Tanwei towards Xiangxue
Location

Hesha Station (Chinese: 河沙站; pinyin: Héshā Zhàn; Jyutping: ho^{4}saa^{1} zaam^{6}; lit. 'river sands') is a station on Line 6 of the Guangzhou Metro. It is located under Yuxian Road (育贤路) on the island of Datansha in the Liwan District of Guangzhou. It started operation on 28 December 2013.

== Station layout ==
G	-	Exits
L1; Concourse	Lobby	Customer Service, Shop, Vending machines, ATMs
L2; Platforms	Platform 2	6 towards Xunfenggang (Shabei)
L2; Platforms	Island platform, doors will open on the left
L2; Platforms	Platform 1	6 towards Xiangxue (Tanwei)

== Exits ==
Exit number	Exit location
Exit A	Yuxian Lu
Exit B	Yuxian Lu
