= Shabei station =

Guangzhou Metro station

Coordinates: 23.1523°N 113.2114°E

Shabei 沙贝
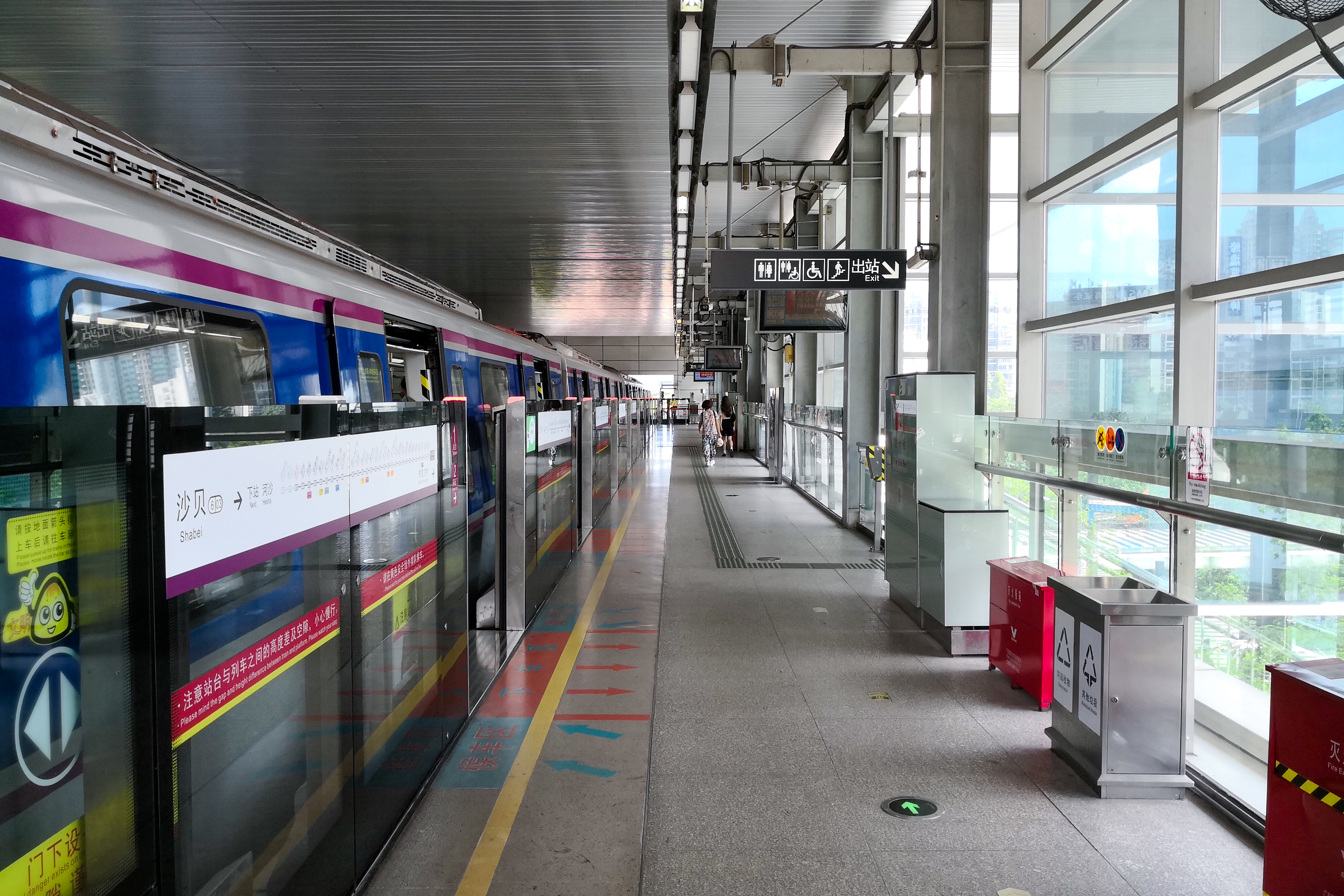
- Platform 1

Chinese name
- Simplified Chinese: 沙贝站
- Traditional Chinese: 沙貝站
Transcriptions
Standard Mandarin
- Hanyu Pinyin: Shābèi Zhàn
Yue: Cantonese
- Jyutping: saa^{1}bui^{3} zaam^{6}

General information
- Location: Jinshazhou, Baiyun District, Guangzhou, Guangdong; China
- Operated by: Guangzhou Metro Co. Ltd.
- Line: Line 6
- Platforms: 2 (2 side platforms)

Construction
- Structure type: Elevated

Other information
- Station code: 603

History
- Opened: 28 December 2013; 12 years ago

Services
Preceding station	Guangzhou Metro	Following station
Hengsha towards Xunfenggang	Line 6	Hesha towards Xiangxue
Location

Shabei Station (Chinese: 沙贝站) is an elevated station of Line 6 on the Guangzhou Metro. The station is one of three Guangzhou Metro stations on the island of Jinshazhou in Baiyun District, and is the closest station to the Jinshazhou Bridge. It started operation on 28 December 2013. From 19 June 2017, during the peak morning period from 07:45 to 08:45, metro authorities began imposing passenger limits.

== Station layout ==
F3; Platforms	Side platform, doors will open on the right
F3; Platforms	Platform 2	6 towards Xunfenggang (Hengsha)
F3; Platforms	Platform 1	6 towards Xiangxue (Hesha)
F3; Platforms	Side platform, doors will open on the right
F2; Concourse	Lobby	Customer Service, Vending machines, ATMs
F2; Concourse	-	Pedestrian overpass
G	-	Exits
L1; Equipment Area	-	Station equipment

== Exits ==
Exit number		Exit location
Exit A	A1	Huanzhou Yilu
Exit A	A2	Huanzhou Yilu
Exit B		Jinshazhou Lu
