= Xunfenggang North station =

Guangzhou Metro Line 12 station

Xunfenggang North 浔峰岗北
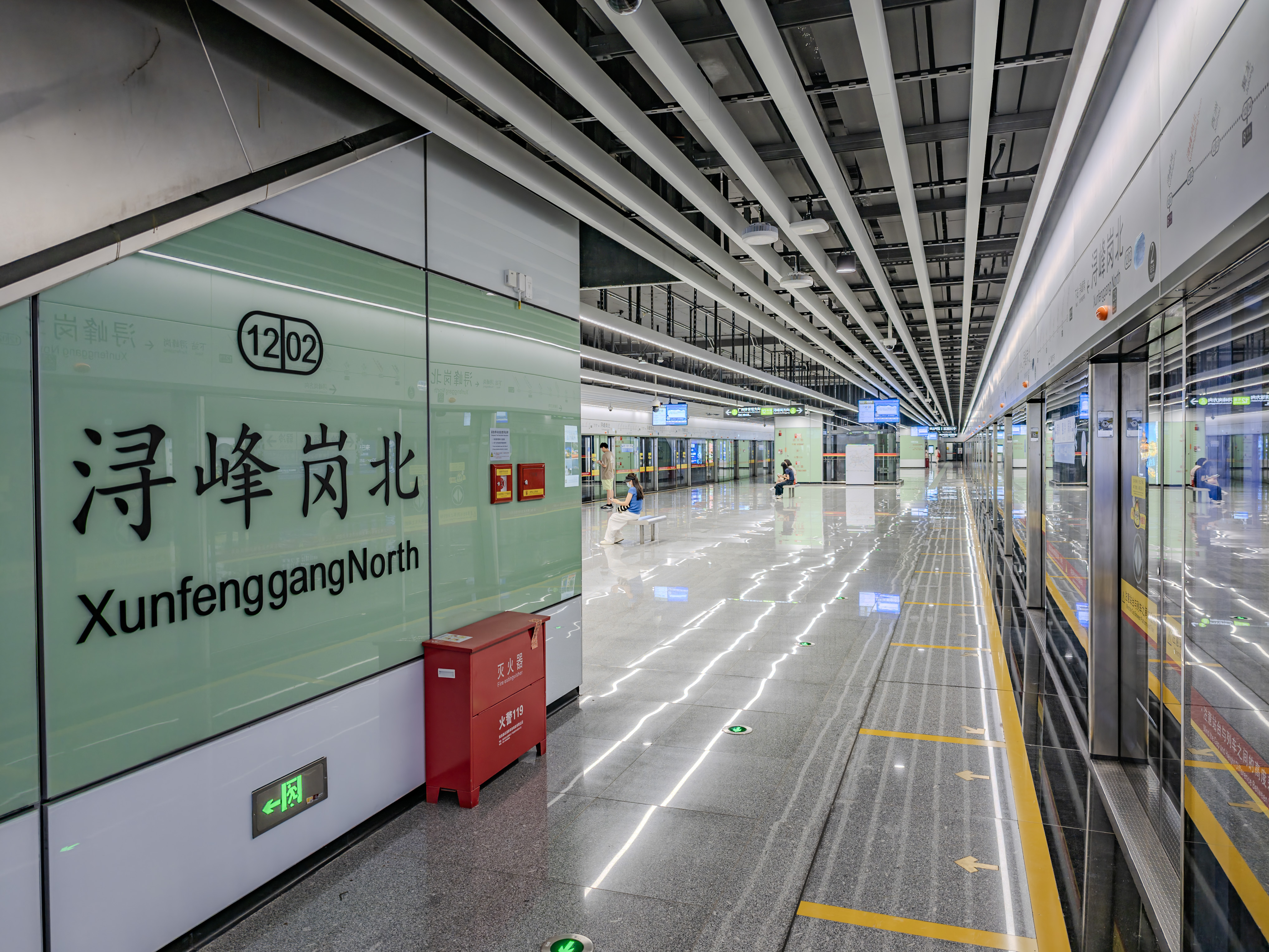
- Platform

Chinese name
- Simplified Chinese: 浔峰岗北站
- Traditional Chinese: 潯峰崗北站
Transcriptions
Standard Mandarin
- Hanyu Pinyin: Xúnfēnggǎng Běi Zhàn
Yue: Cantonese
- Yale Romanization: Chàhmfūnggōng Bāk Jaahm
- Jyutping: Cam^{4}fung^{1}gong^{1} Bak^{1} Zaam^{6}
- Hong Kong Romanization: Cham Fung Kong North station

General information
- Location: West side of the intersection of Xunfengshan East Road (浔峰山东路) and Huicai 1st Street (汇才一街); Jinsha Subdistrict, Jinshazhou, Baiyun District, Guangzhou, Guangdong; China
- Coordinates: 23°10′30.97″N 113°12′5.58″E
- Operator: Guangzhou Metro Co. Ltd.
- Line: Line 12
- Platforms: 2 (1 island platform)
- Tracks: 2

Construction
- Structure type: Underground
- Accessible: Yes

Other information
- Station code: 1202

History
- Opened: 29 June 2025 (13 months ago)
- Former names: Liheng Road (里横路)

Services
Preceding station	Guangzhou Metro	Following station
Xunfenggang Terminus	Line 12 West section	Xizhou towards Guangzhou Gymnasium
Location

Xunfenggang North Station (simplified Chinese: 浔峰岗北站; traditional Chinese: 潯峰崗北站; Jyutping: cam^{4} fung^{1} gong^{1} bak^{1} zaam^{6}; Cantonese Yale: Chàhmfūnggōng Bāk Jaahm) is a station on Line 12 of the Guangzhou Metro. It is located underground on the west side of the intersection of Xunfengshan East Road and Huicai 1st Street in Jinshazhou, Baiyun District. It opened on 29 June 2025.

== Station layout ==
The station has two floors. The ground level is the exit. It is surrounded by Xunfengshan East Road, Huicai 1st Street, Xunfengshan Park and nearby residential communities. The first floor is the concourse, and the second floor is the Line 12 platform.

G	-	Exits A, B2, C
L1; Concourse	-	Ticket machines, Customer Service, Shops, Police stations, Security Facilities
L2; Platforms	Platform 2	12 towards Xunfenggang (terminus)
L2; Platforms	Island platform, doors will open on the left (Toilets, Nursery)
L2; Platforms	Platform 1	12 towards Guangzhou Gymnasium (Xizhou)

=== Concourse ===
There are automatic ticket machines and an AI customer service center at the concourse. There is also a convenience store, bakery and pastry shop and various self-service facilities. In addition, there is an automated external defibrillator next to the station control center.

There are elevators, escalators, and stairs in the fare-paid area for passengers to reach the platform.

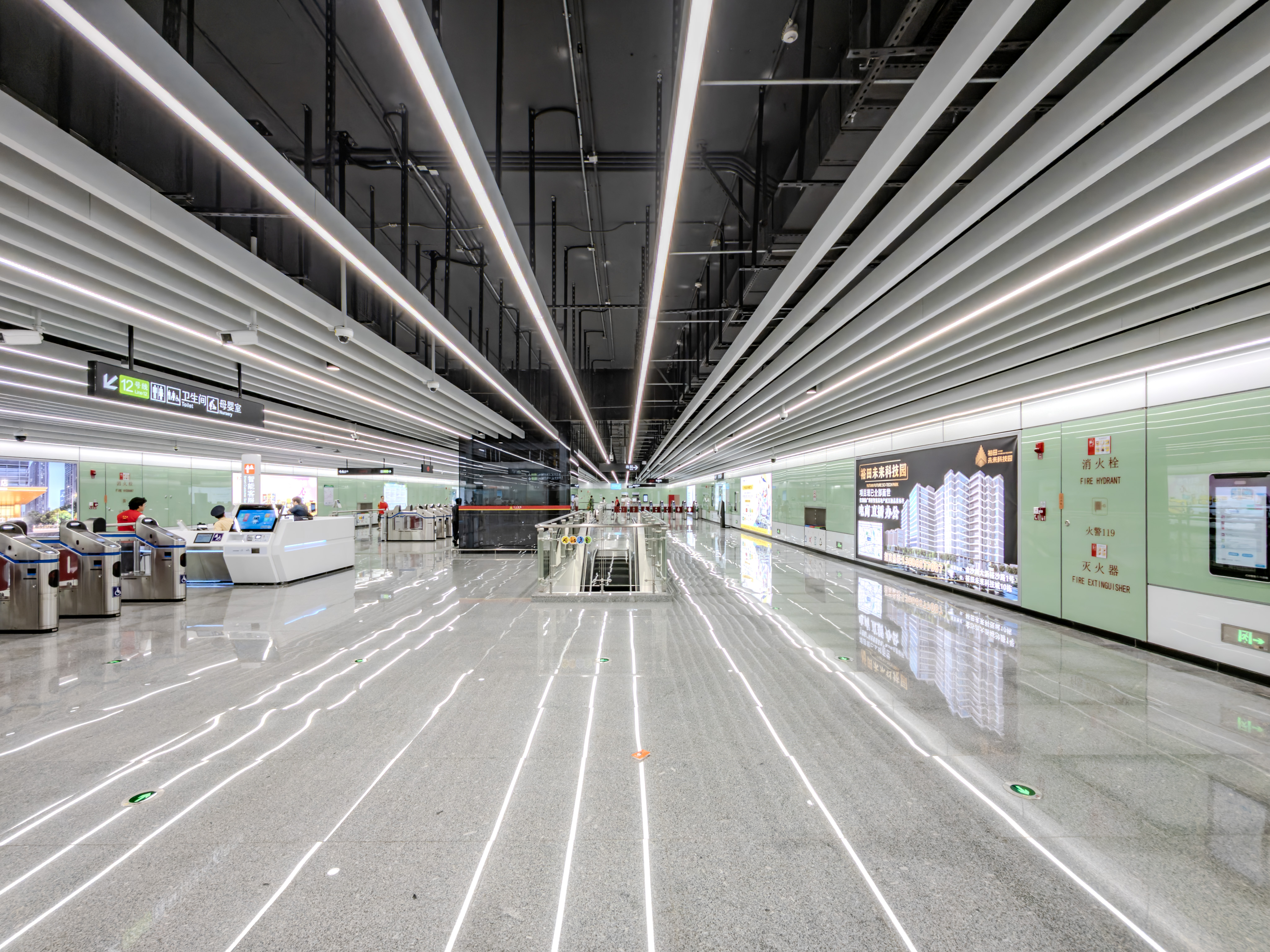
Concourse

=== Platform ===
The station has island platform located under the west side of Xunfengshan East Road.

In addition, toilets and a nursery room are located at the end of the platform towards Xunfenggang station.

=== Entrances/exits ===
The station was planned to have 4 points of entry/exit, of which only 3 were opened when the station initially opened. Construction of Exit B1 was postponed due to opposition by nearby residents. Exit B2 is equipped with an elevator.

- A: Xunfengshan East Road
- B2: Xunfengshan East Road
- C: Xunfengshan East Road
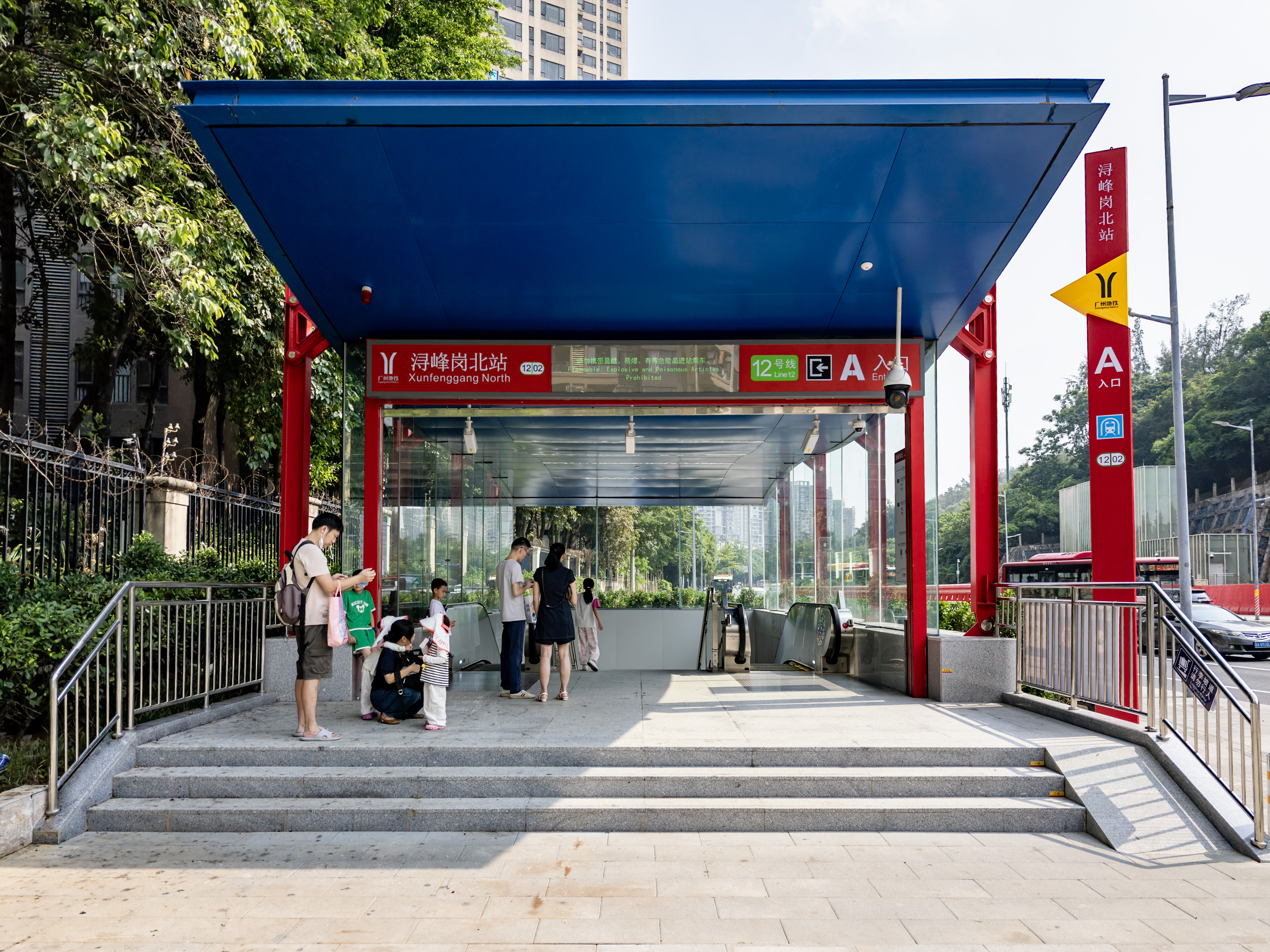
Entrance A

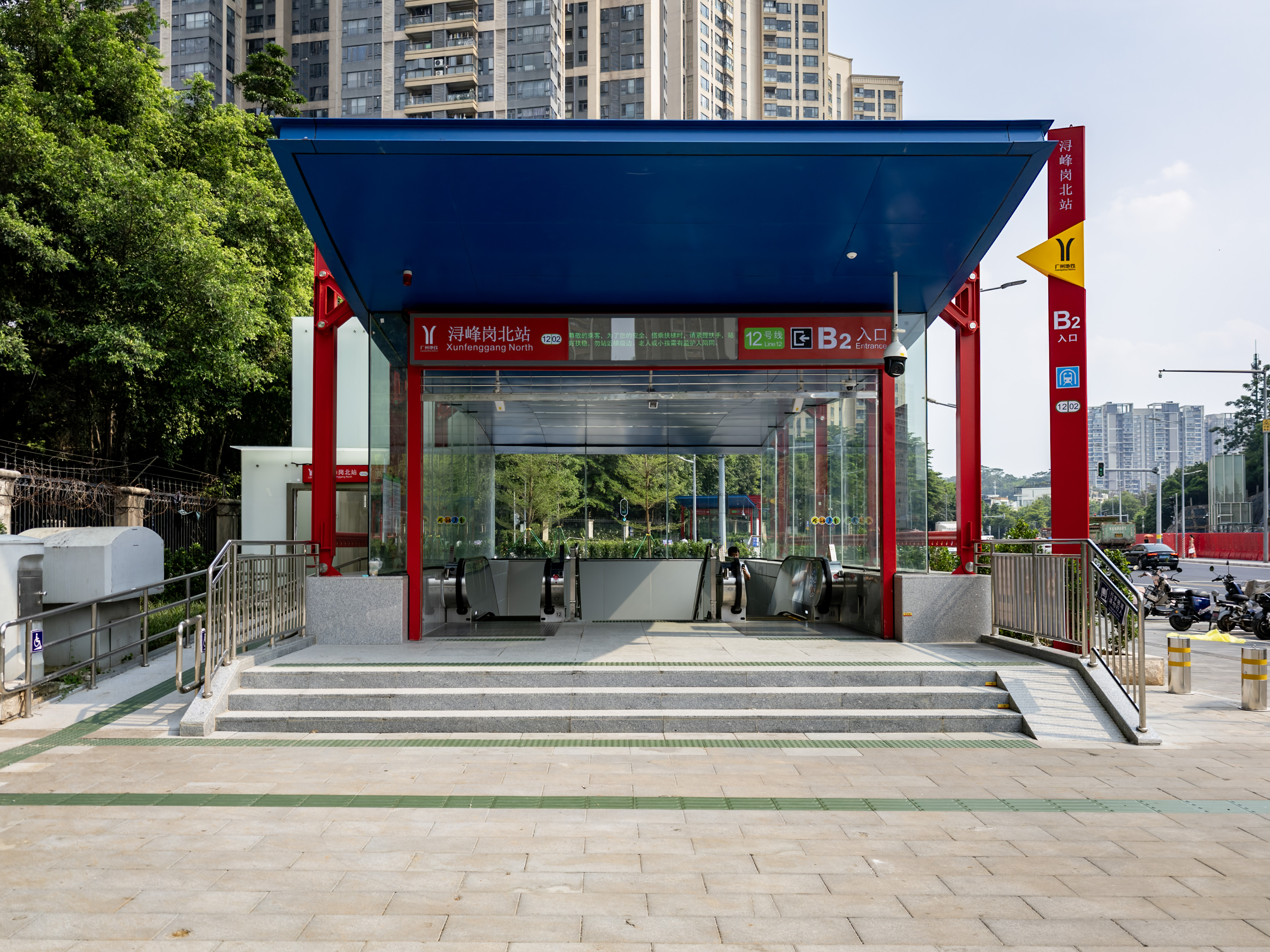
Entrance B2

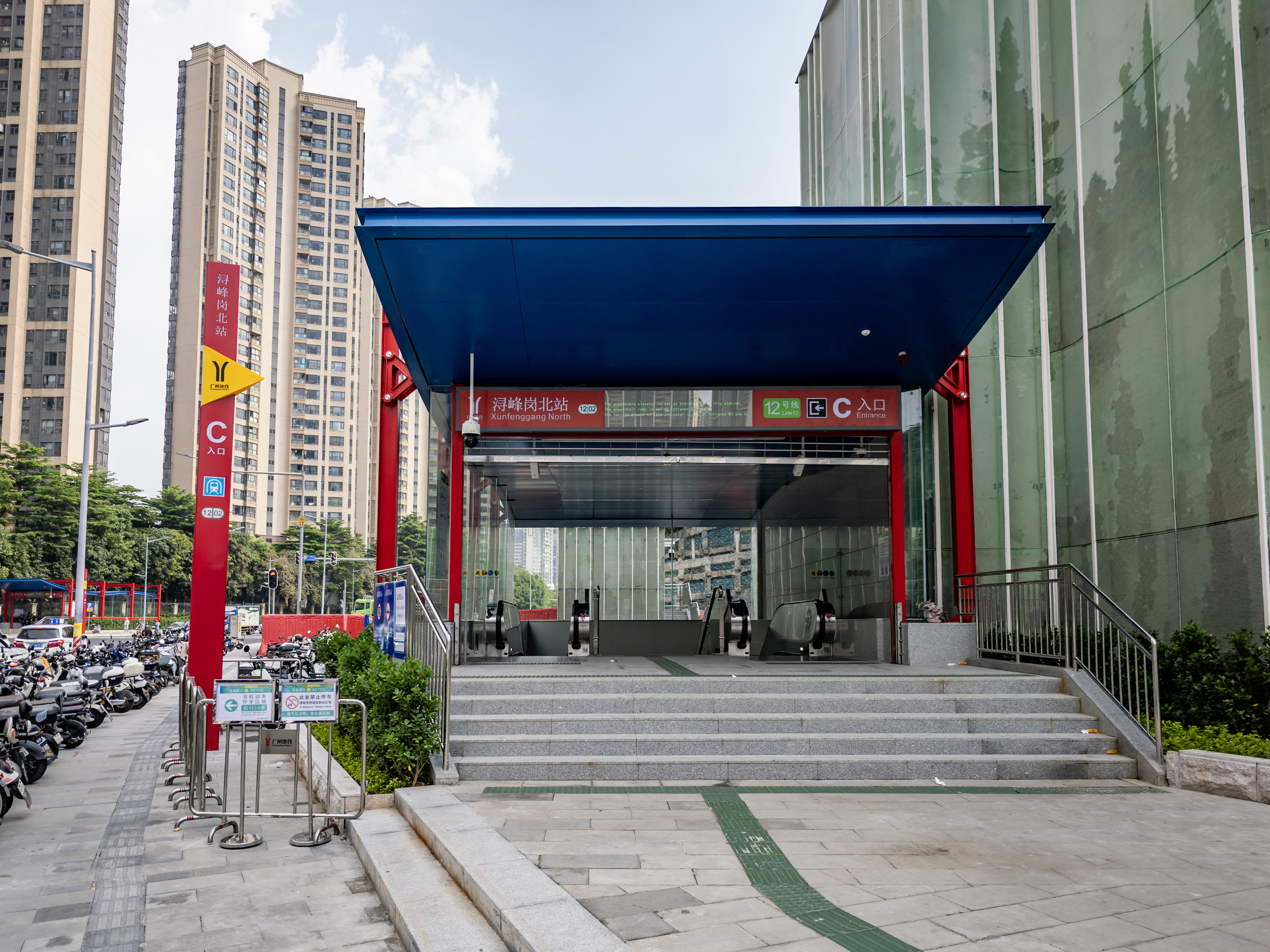
Entrance C

== History ==
This station was not included in the original plan for Line 12. In order the improve transit in Jinshazhou, the Guangzhou authorities planned to extend Line 12 from Chatou station across the Pearl River to Xunfenggang station in 2014. Later, this station was added as in infill station and named Liheng Road station.

On 28 February 2025, the station completed the “three rights” transfer.

On 8 April 2025, the preliminary names of the stations on the western section of Line 12 were announced, and the station was renamed to Xunfenggang North station.

On 29 June 2025, the station opened.

== Transportation ==
The Nanhai Tram Line 2 will have a station at Xunfenggang North. There are currently no reserved transfer tunnels at this station, which means transfers will be out-of-station.
