= Xizhou station (Guangzhou Metro) =

Guangzhou Metro Line 12 and Line 13 station

Xizhou 西洲
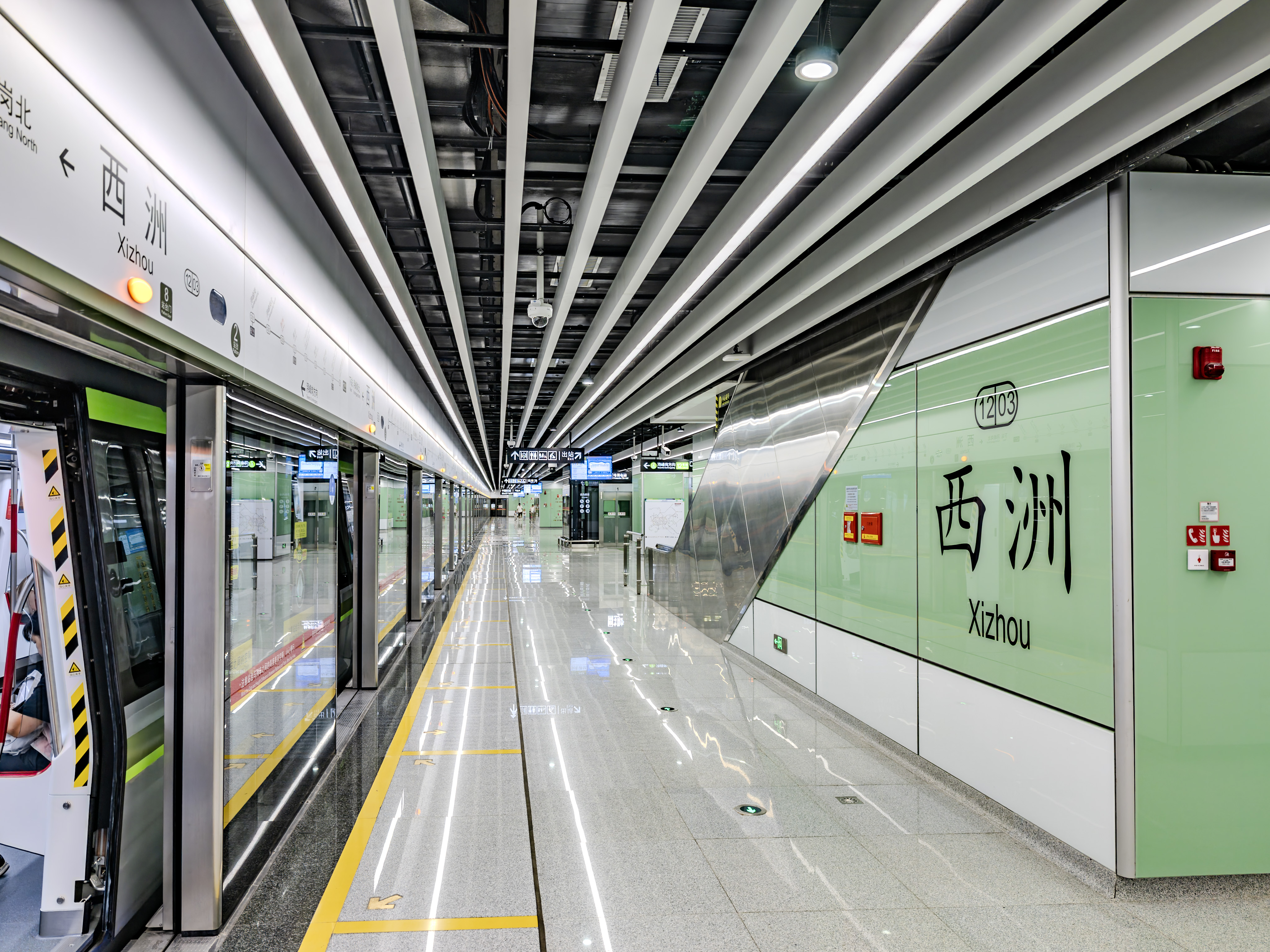
- Platform 2 (towards Xunfenggang)

Chinese name
- Chinese: 西洲站
- Literal meaning: west island station
Transcriptions
Standard Mandarin
- Hanyu Pinyin: Xīzhōu Zhàn
Yue: Cantonese
- Yale Romanization: Sāijāu Jaahm
- Jyutping: Sai^{1} zau^{1} Zaam^{6}
- Hong Kong Romanization: Sai Chau station

General information
- Location: South side of the intersection of planned Chashen Avenue (槎神大道) and Tanxi Road (潭溪路); Songzhou Subdistrict, Baiyun District, Guangzhou, Guangdong; China
- Coordinates: 23°11′12.66″N 113°13′3.29″E
- Operator: Guangzhou Metro Co. Ltd.
- Lines: Line 12; Line 13 (2026)
- Platforms: 4 (2 island platforms)
- Tracks: 4

Construction
- Structure type: Underground
- Accessible: Yes

Other information
- Station code: 1203

History
- Opened: Line 12: 29 June 2025 (16 months ago); Line 13: December 2026 (1 month's time)
- Former names: Chatou (槎头)

Services
Preceding station	Guangzhou Metro	Following station
Xunfenggang North towards Xunfenggang	Line 12 West section	Julong towards Guangzhou Gymnasium
Future services (2026)
Huanggang towards Yagang	Line 13	Chalong towards Xinsha
Location

Xizhou station (Chinese: 西洲站; Jyutping: sai^{1} zau^{1} zaam^{6}; Cantonese Yale: Sāijāu Jaahm) is an interchange station between Line 12 and Line 13 of the Guangzhou Metro. It is located south of the intersection of Chashan Avenue and Guanghai Road, in the Baiyun District of Guangzhou. The station was opened on 29 June 2025, and Line 13 is expected to be extended to this station by 2026.

The Line 12 section of the station is connected to the nearby Chatou Depot.

== Station layout ==
The station is a three-storey underground station constructed using cut-and-cover. The ground level is the exit, and it is surrounded by the planned Chashen Avenue, Tanxi Road and other nearby buildings. The first floor is the concourse, the second floor is the platform for Line 12, and the third floor is the platform for Line 13.

G	-	Exits A1, A2, B, D, E
L1; Concourse	Lobby	Ticket Machines, Customer Service, Shops, Police Station, Security Facilities
L2; Platforms	Platform 2	12 towards Xunfenggang (Xunfenggang North)
L2; Platforms	Island platform, doors will open on the left (Toilets, Nursery)
L2; Platforms	Platform 1	12 towards Guangzhou Gymnasium (Julong)
L2; Platforms	Line 13 Equipment Area	Station Equipment
M	Transfer Lobby	Transfer between Lines 12 and 13
L3; Platforms (U/C)	Platform 4	13 towards Yagang (Huanggang)
L3; Platforms (U/C)	Island platform, doors will open on the left (U/C)
L3; Platforms (U/C)	Platform 3	13 towards Xinsha (Chalong)

=== Concourse ===
The two Line 12 and Line 13 concourses form a "T" shape, with Line 12 in an east-west direction and Line 13 in a north-south direction. There are elevators, escalators and stairs in the fare-paid areas of Line 12 and Line 13 for passengers to access the platforms. As the second phase of Line 13 has not yet been opened, the stairs, escalators and dedicated elevators leading from the concourse to Line 13 are currently closed.

The concourses are equipped with equipped with electronic ticket vending machines and AI customer service centers as well as self-service facilities. An automated external defibrillator is located near the station control center next to Exit D.

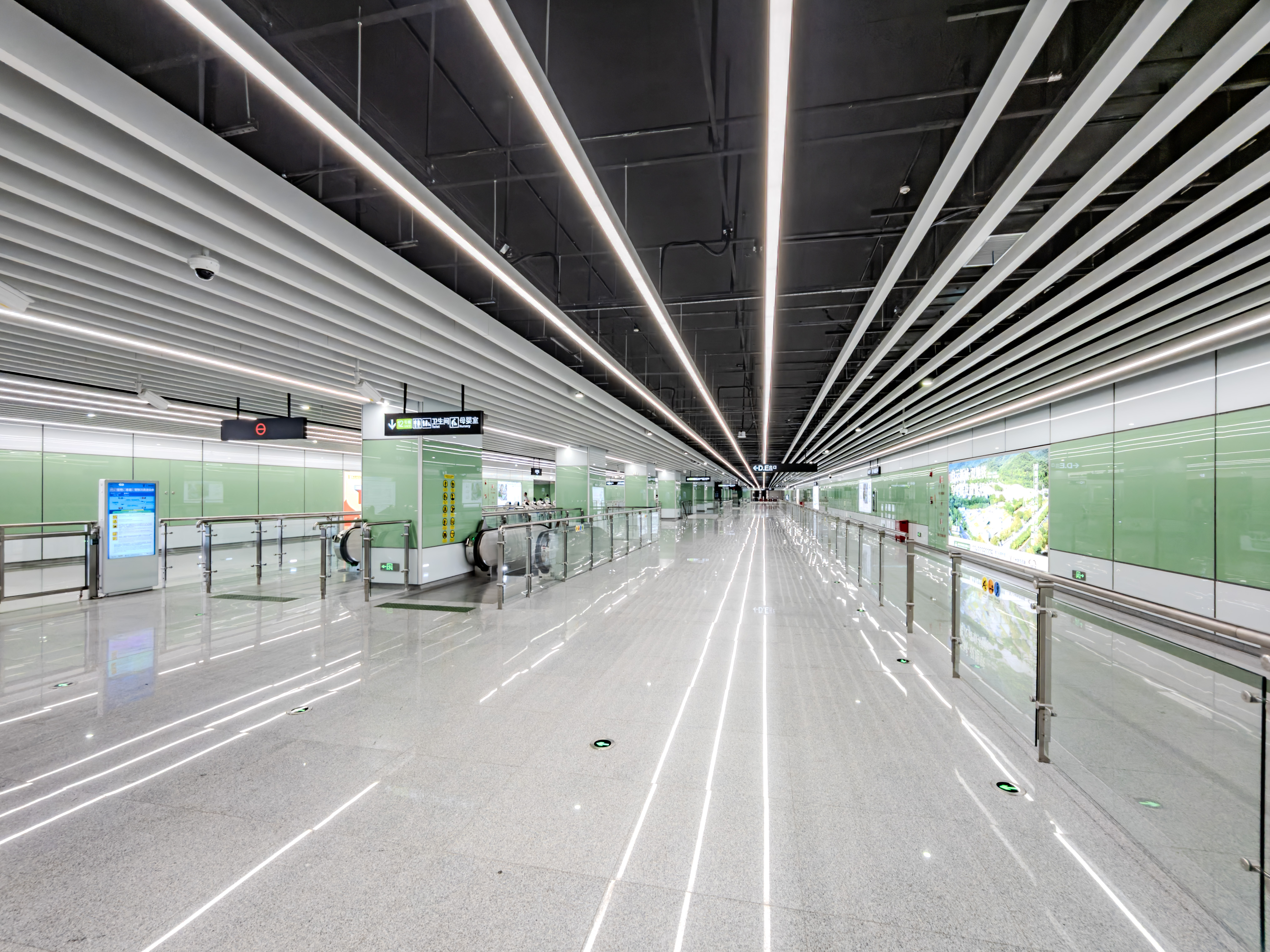
Concourse

=== Platforms ===
The station will have 2 island platforms, one for each line. The Line 12 platform is located under the branch road south of Tanxi Road, and the Line 13 platform is located under Chashen Avenue. The two platforms form a "T" shape, with the Line 12 platform located on the second floor, and the Line 13 platform located on the third floor. Toilets and a nursery room are located at the end of the platform towards Julong.

=== Entrances/exits ===
The station has 5 points of entry/exit. Exit A1 is equipped with an elevator.

- A1: Guanghai Road
- A2: Guanghai Road
- B: Guanghai Road
- D: Qingcha Road
- E: Qingcha Road
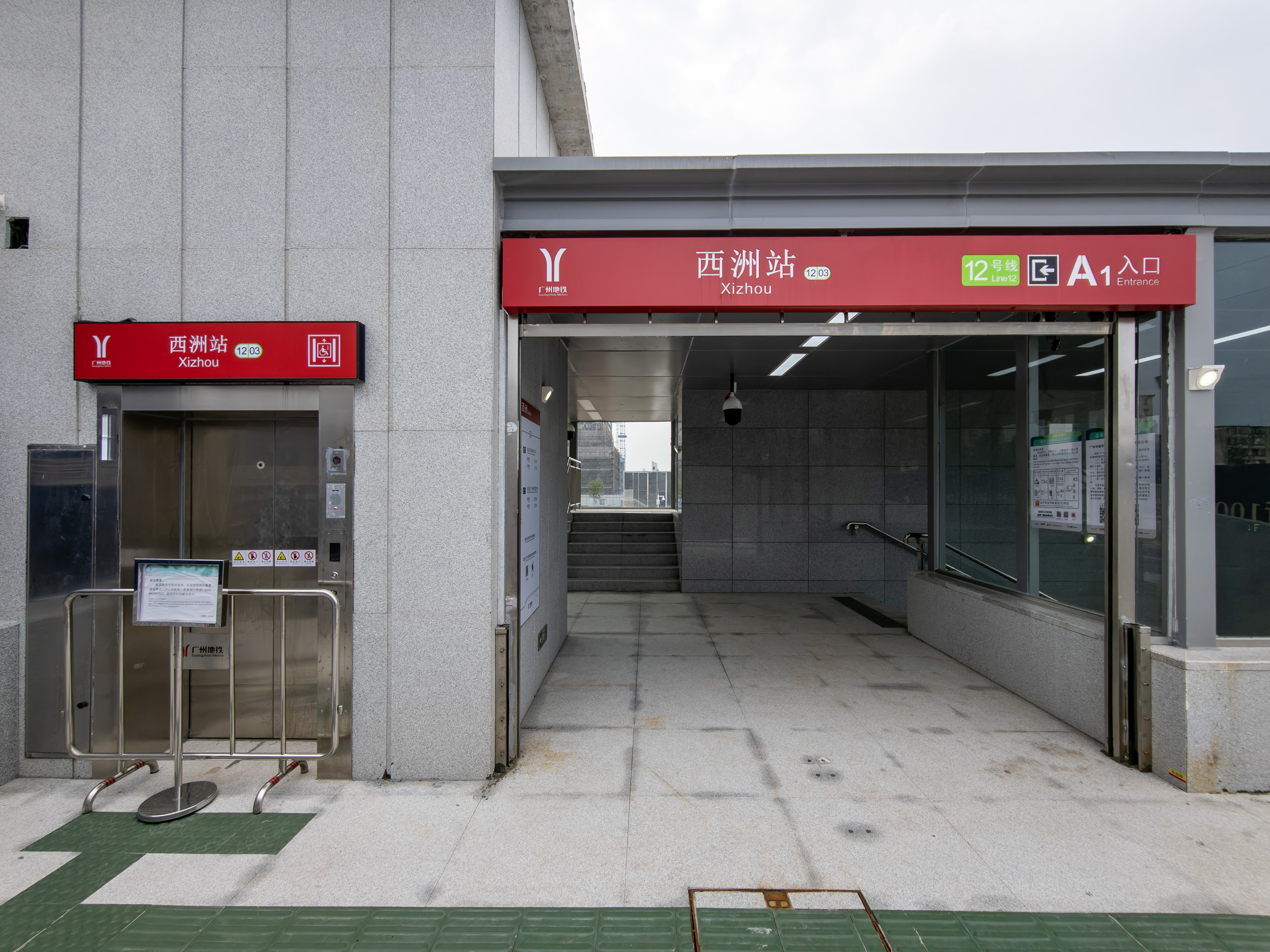
Entrance A1

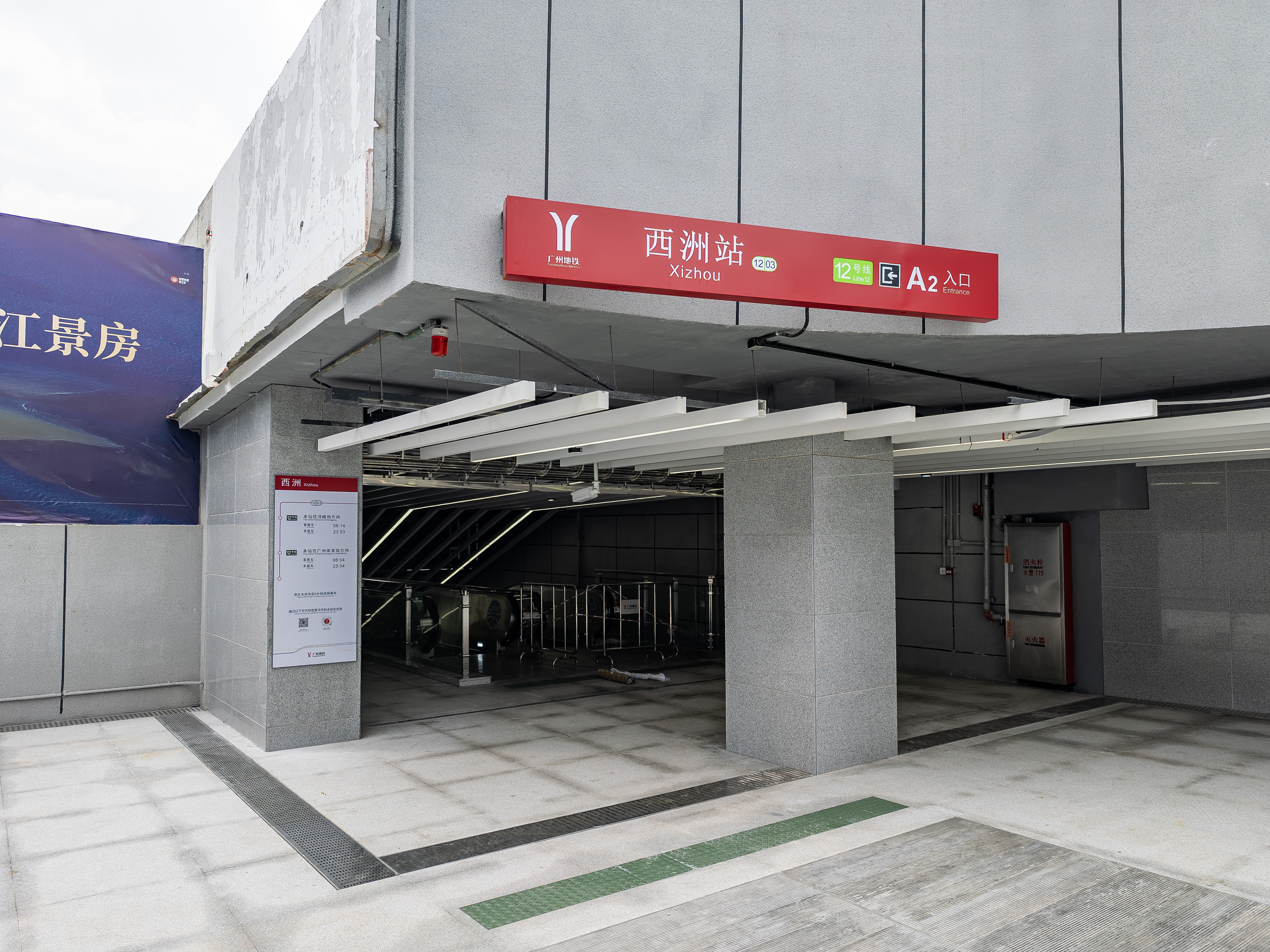
Entrance A2

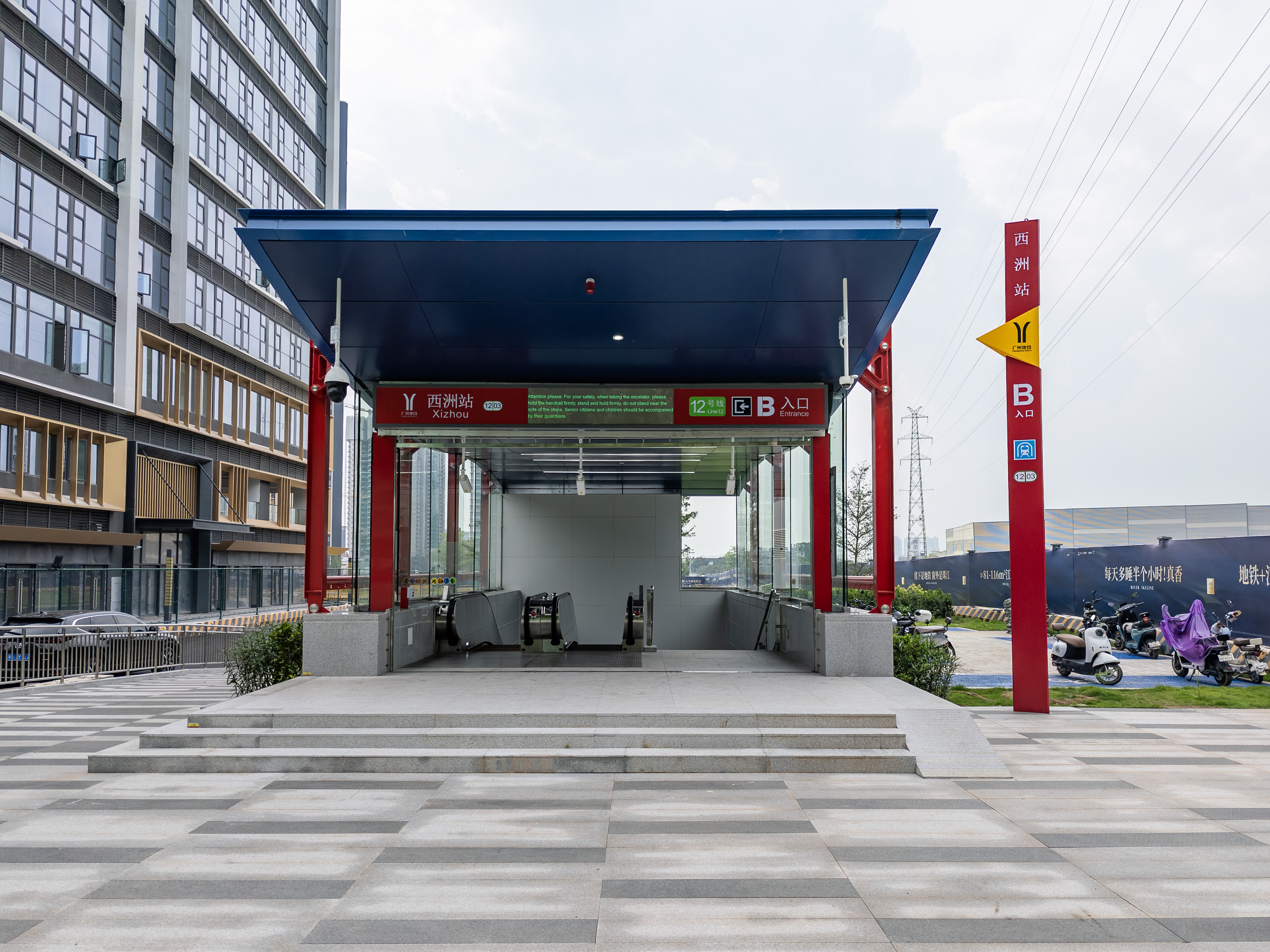
Entrance B

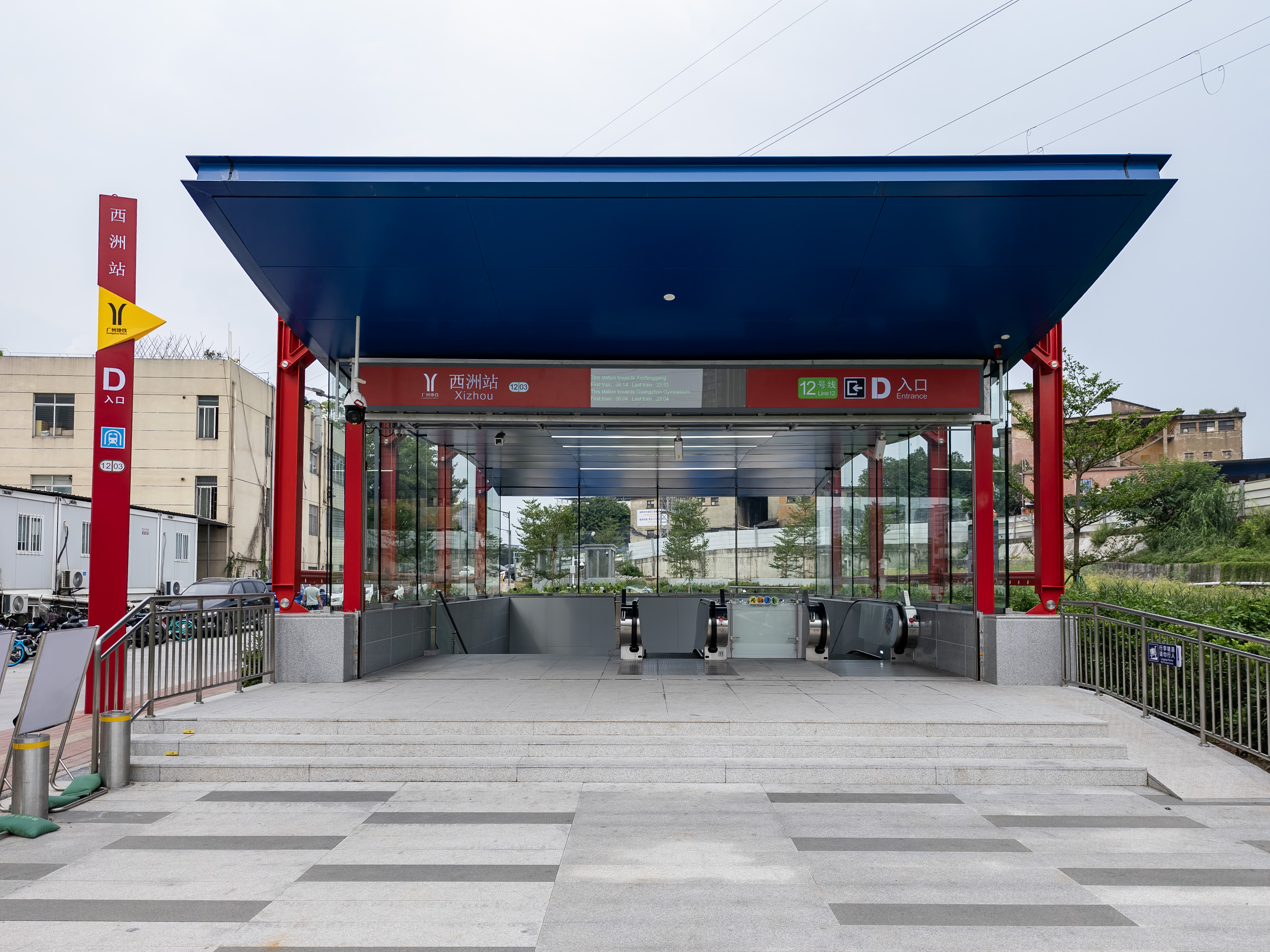
Entrance D

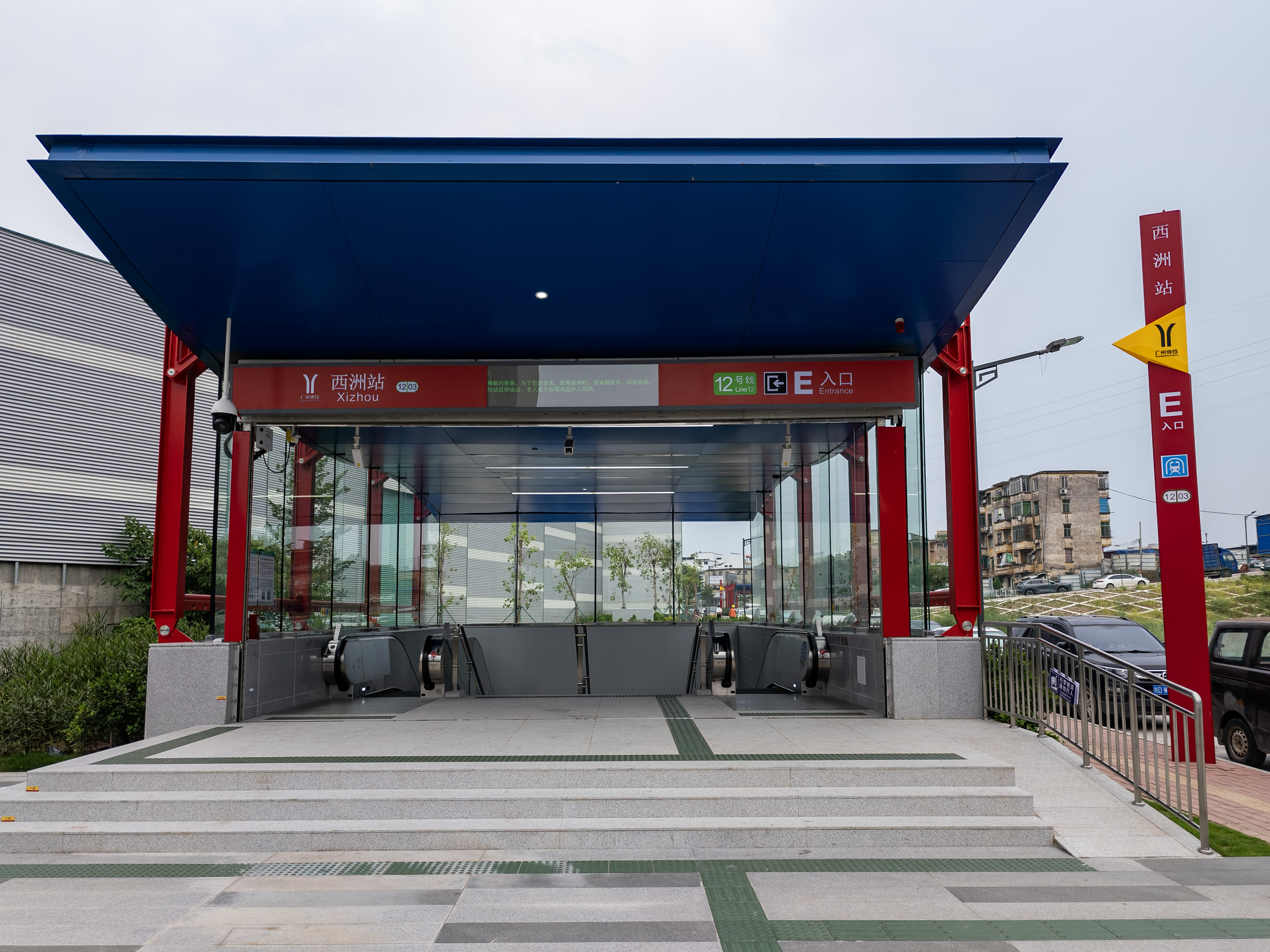
Entrance E

== History ==
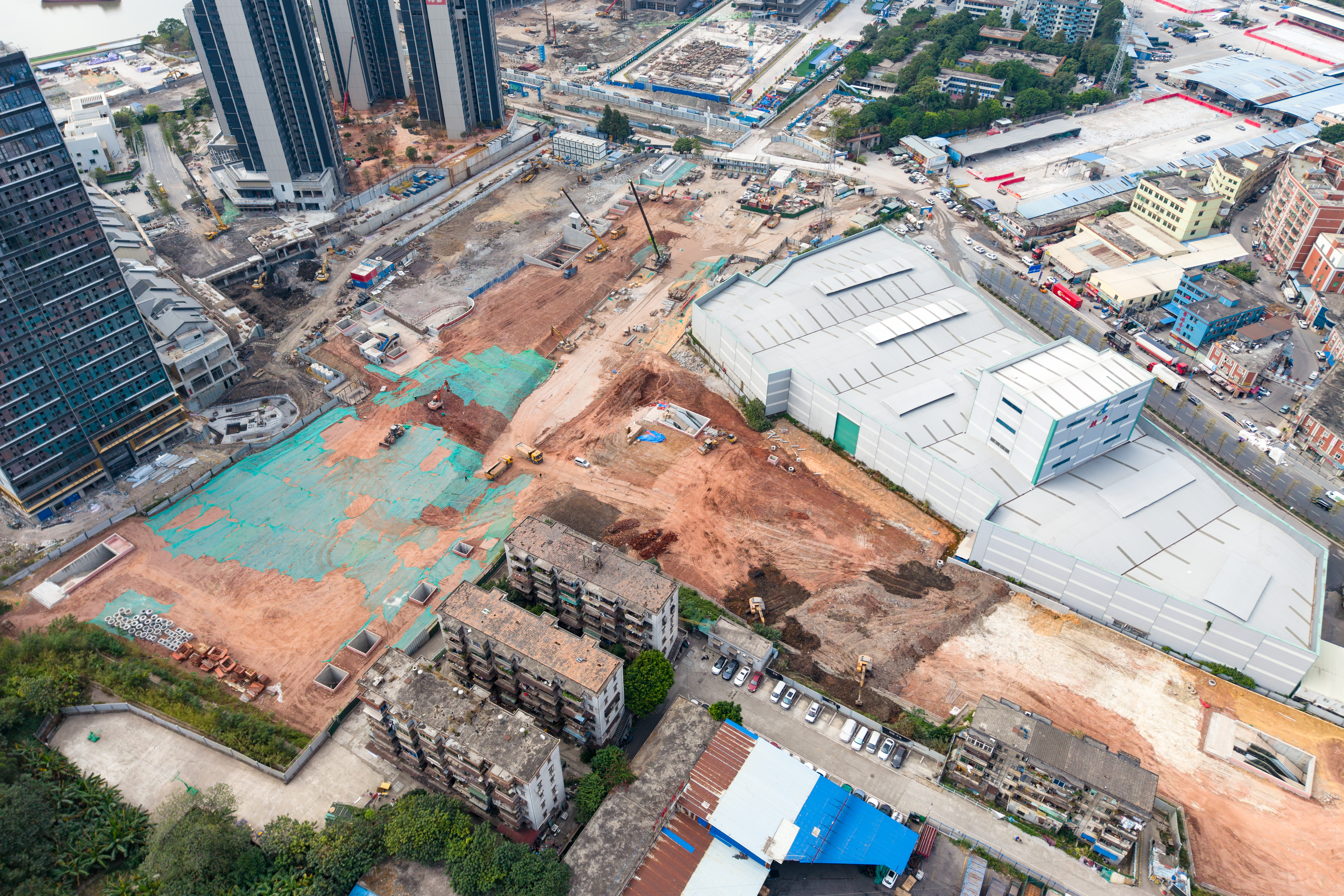
Construction site (November 2024)

During planning and construction, the station was named Chatou station based on the name of the area where it's located. After becoming an interchange station between Line 12 and Line 13, the station was included in the construction scope of the second phase of Line 13. The station started construction on 29 April 2019, and entered the main construction phase on 30 November.

On 6 March 2025, the station completed the “Three Rights” transfer.

On 8 April 2025, the preliminary names of the stations on the west section of Line 12 were announced. Since the name of the original Chatou Village has been changed to Chalong Village, and the geography of Chalong Village has changed significantly, the station is proposed to be named Xizhou station based on the Xizhou community where it is located. Some citizens and experts believe that the more well-known district name "Chatou" should be used from the perspective of protecting the old place name; the Xizhou community where the station is located believes that the location of the station is not highly related to "Chatou" and its homophony is not elegant, and the name "Xizhou" has a better meaning. However, the authorities did not accept the relevant suggestions on the grounds that they were not very instructive, and the station was named Xizhou station the following month.

On 29 June 2025, the Line 12 station was opened.

== Future expansions ==
The Line 13 section of the station is under construction. When Phase 2 of Line 13 opens, the concourse, platforms, and transfer tunnels of Line 13 will be put to use.

In addition, this station will be developed into a complex above the station in the future, and the future Foshan Metro Line 6 will have a station here. When the station was built, reserves were built for the future expansion of Line 6.
