= Datansha =

Island in Guangzhou, China

Coordinates: 23.132586°N 113.214105°E

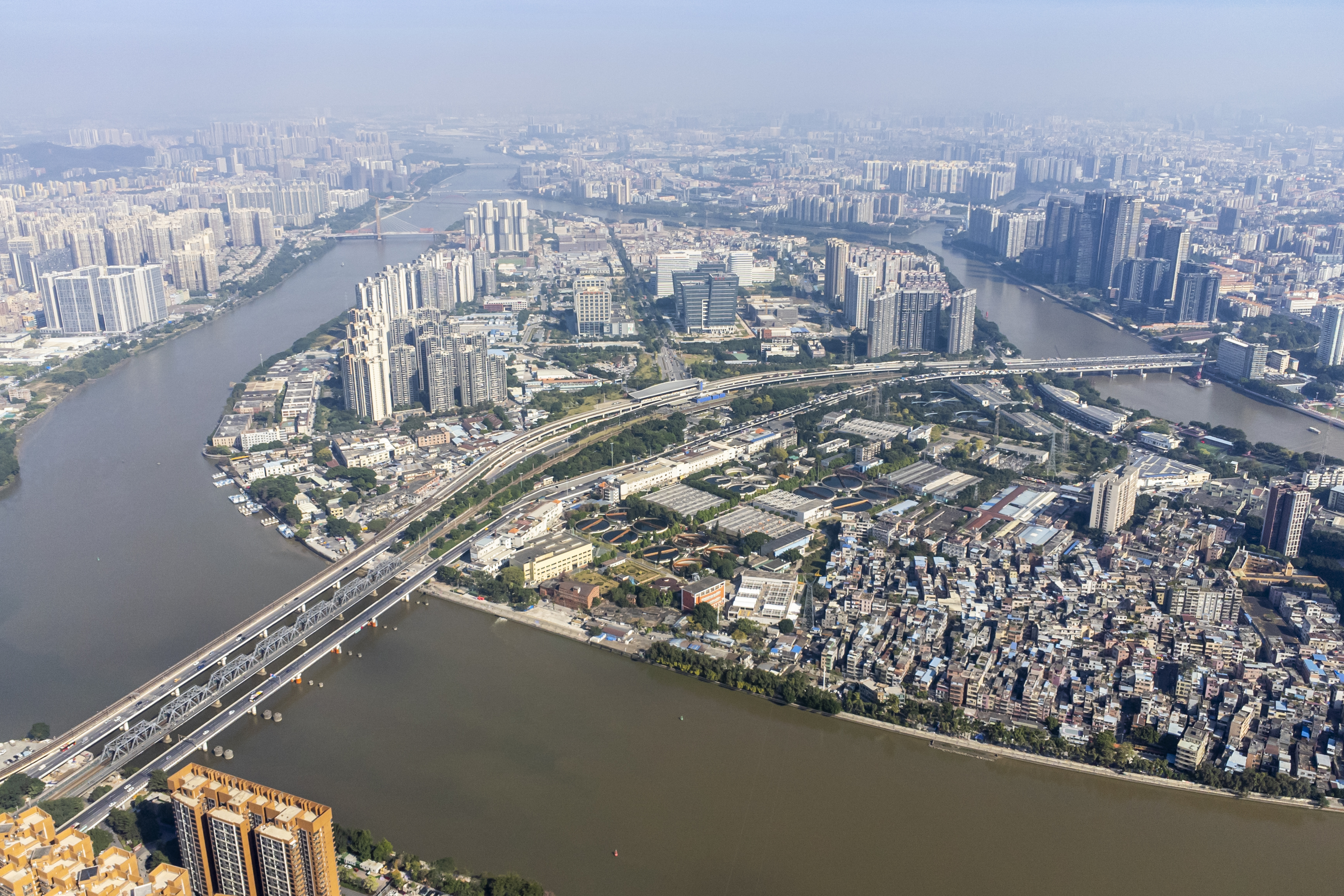
Aerial view

Datansha Island (Chinese: 大坦沙岛) is an island at the west of the central district of Guangzhou, Guangdong, China. It has a total area of 4.4 square kilometres.

== Administration ==
The island was administrated by Baiyun District, but it is administered by Liwan District after 2002.

== Economy ==
The island has been an industrial area in the district, but it is being planned to develop to an economic zone of Bai'etan (Chinese: 白鹅潭) region.

== Transportation ==
There are two metro stations in Datansha, Tanwei Station and Hesha Station.
