= Xunfenggang station =

Guangzhou Metro Line 6 and Line 12 station

Xunfenggang 浔峰岗
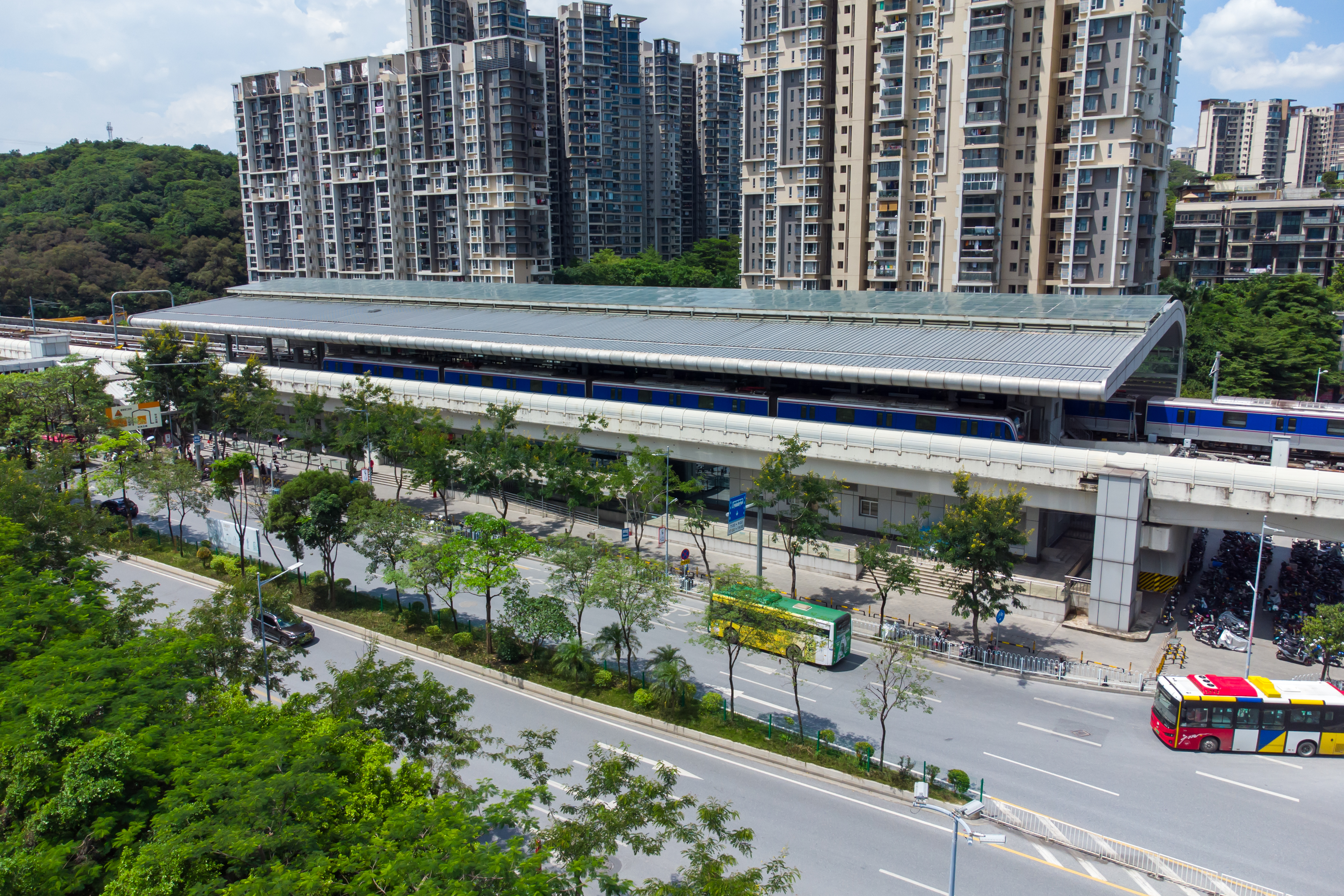
- Line 6 station exterior

Chinese name
- Simplified Chinese: 浔峰岗站
- Traditional Chinese: 潯峰崗站
- Literal meaning: hill at the river's edge peak station
Transcriptions
Standard Mandarin
- Hanyu Pinyin: Xúnfēnggǎng Zhàn
Yue: Cantonese
- Yale Romanization: Chàhmfūnggōng Jaahm
- Jyutping: cam^{4}fung^{1}gong^{1} zaam^{6}
- Hong Kong Romanization: Cham Fung Kong station

General information
- Location: East side of the intersection of Jinshazhou Road (金沙洲路) and Xunfengshan East Road (浔峰山东路); Jinshazhou, Baiyun District, Guangzhou, Guangdong; China
- Coordinates: 23°10′0.10″N 113°11′47.31″E
- Operator: Guangzhou Metro Co. Ltd.
- Lines: Line 6; Line 12
- Platforms: 5 (1 island platform and 3 side platforms)
- Tracks: 5

Construction
- Structure type: Elevated (Line 6); Underground (Line 12)
- Accessible: Yes

Other information
- Station code: 601 1201

History
- Opened: Line 6: 28 December 2013 (12 years ago); Line 12: 29 June 2025 (13 months ago)

Services
Preceding station	Guangzhou Metro	Following station
Terminus	Line 6	Hengsha towards Xiangxue
Terminus	Line 12 West section	Xunfenggang North towards Guangzhou Gymnasium
Location

Xunfenggang Station (simplified Chinese: 浔峰岗站; traditional Chinese: 潯峰崗站; Jyutping: cam^{4} fung^{1} gong^{1} zaam^{6}; Cantonese Yale: Chàhmfūnggōng Jaahm; lit. 'hill at the river's edge peak station') is an interchange station between Line 6 and Line 12 of the Guangzhou Metro, and serves as the western terminus for both lines. The Line 6 station started operations on 28 December 2013. It is located at the south of the area of Xunfenggang (浔峰岗), A1 Road, Jinshazhou, Baiyun District. The terminus approaches near Lishui, Nanhai District, Foshan, which is just over the hill next to the station. Line 12 opened at this station on 29 June 2025, thus becoming an interchange station.

== Station layout ==
The station is divided into two sections, Line 6 and Line 12, of which the two lines are connected by a passenger distribution concourse on the ground level. It is surrounded by Xunfengshan East Road, Jinshazhou Road, Xunfenggang Bus Terminus and other nearby buildings.

Both station sections include toilets, of which the Line 6 toilets is located in the non-paid area of the surface level concourse, and toilets and a nursery room are located at the western end of the two side platforms on Line 12.

=== Line 6 ===
The Line 6 station is a three-storey elevated station. The ground floor is the concourse, the second floor is a pedestrian overpass, and the third floor are the platforms for Line 6.

F3; Platforms	-	Exit C (Exiting only); Via passenger distribution concourse towards Line 12
F3; Platforms	Side platform, doors will open on the right
F3; Platforms	Platform 2	6 termination platform
F3; Platforms	Platform 1	6 towards Xiangxue (Hengsha)
F3; Platforms	Island platform, doors will open on the left, right
F3; Platforms	Platform 3	No regular service
F2	-	Pedestrian overpass
G Concourse	Lobby	Exits A and B, Ticket Machines, Customer Service, Toilets, Police Station, Security Facilities

=== Line 12 ===
The Line 12 station is a three-storey underground station. The ground floor is the passenger distribution concourse (with Exits D1 and D2) and Exits E, F and H, the first floor is the concourse and other passageways, and the second floor are the platforms for Line 12.

G Concourse	Passenger Distribution Lobby	Exits D1, D2, E, F, H, Ticket Machines, Customer Service, Security Screening Facilities; Towards Line 6 platforms and Line 12 concourse
L1; Concourse	Transfer Passage	Via passenger distribution concourse towards Line 6
L1; Concourse	12 Lobby	Ticket Machines, Customer Service, Police Station, Security Facilities
L2; Platforms	Side platform, doors will open on the right
L2; Platforms	Platform 5	12 termination platform
L2; Platforms	Platform 4	12 towards Guangzhou Gymnasium (Xunfenggang North)
L2; Platforms	Side platform, doors will open on the right

=== Concourse and transfer method ===
The concourse is divided into 3 parts, Line 6, Line 12 and the passenger distribution concourse. The Line 6 and passenger distribution concourses are located on ground level, and the Line 12 concourse is located on the first underground floor. The three are not connected to each other in the non-paid area, and passengers from the Line 6 concourse will need to pass through the Line 6 platforms first before reaching the passenger distribution concourse and the Line 12 station.

There are elevators, escalators, and stairs in the fare-paid areas of the Line 6 and Line 12 concourses for passengers to reach the platforms. There is a long passage in the southwest corner of the station leading to the passenger distribution concourse to transfer to Line 6. Exits E, F and H are separated by a paid area. The passenger distribution concourse handles the transfer between Line 6 and Line 12 via escalators, stairs and an elevator.

There are automatic ticket machines and an intelligent customer service center at all three concourses. There is an automated external defibrillator near Exit B on the Line 6 concourse.

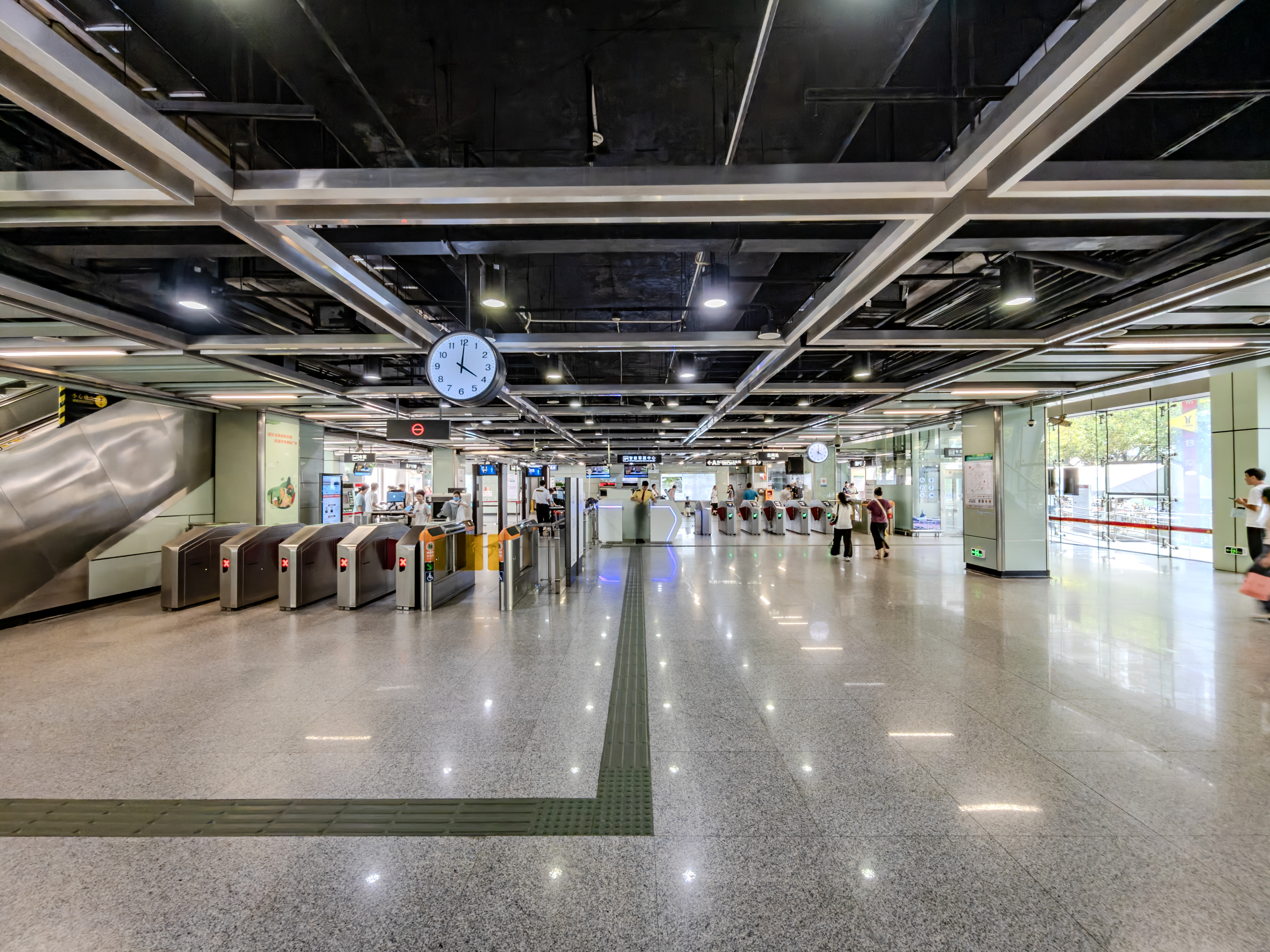
Line 6 concourse

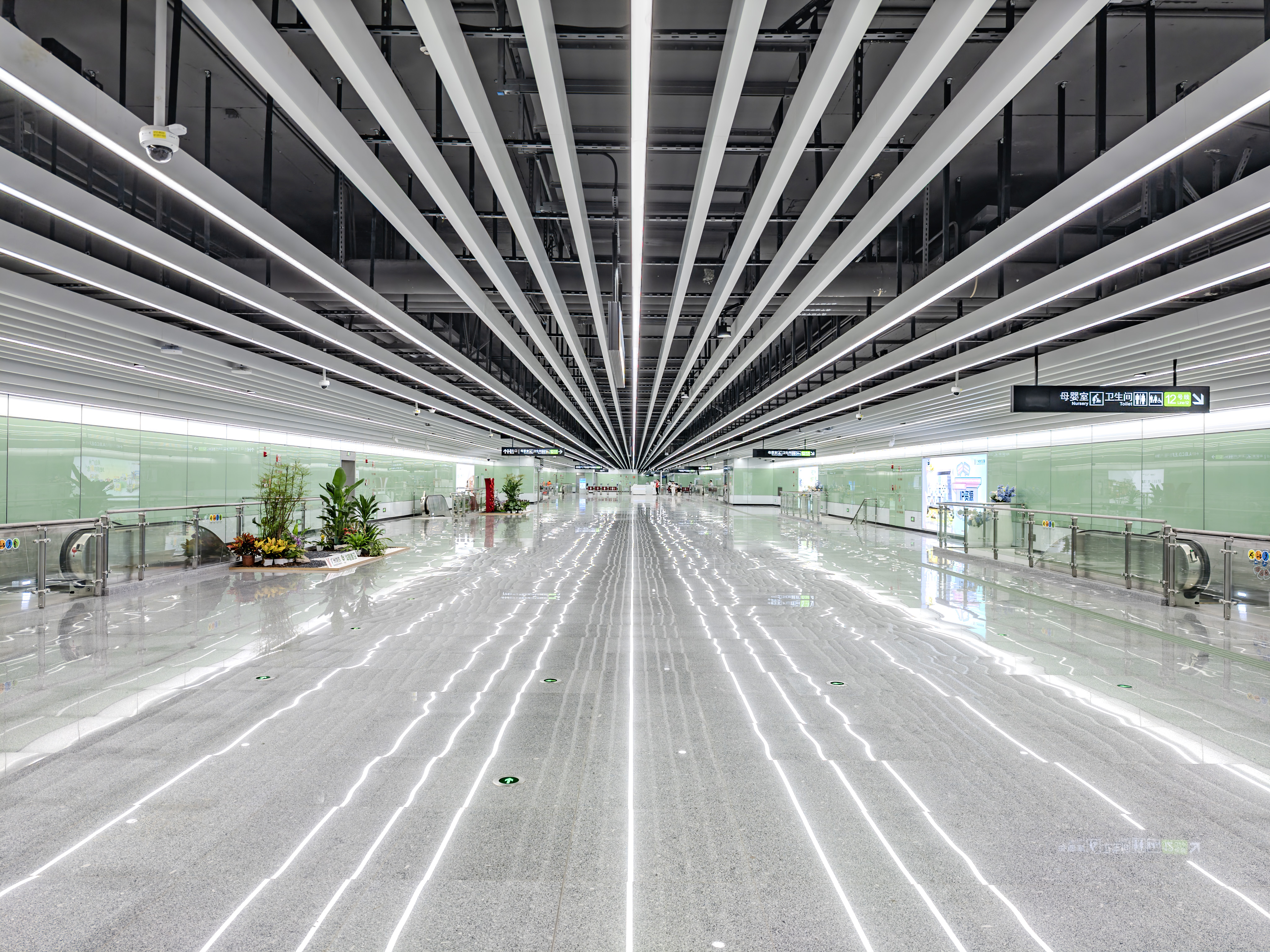
Line 12 concourse

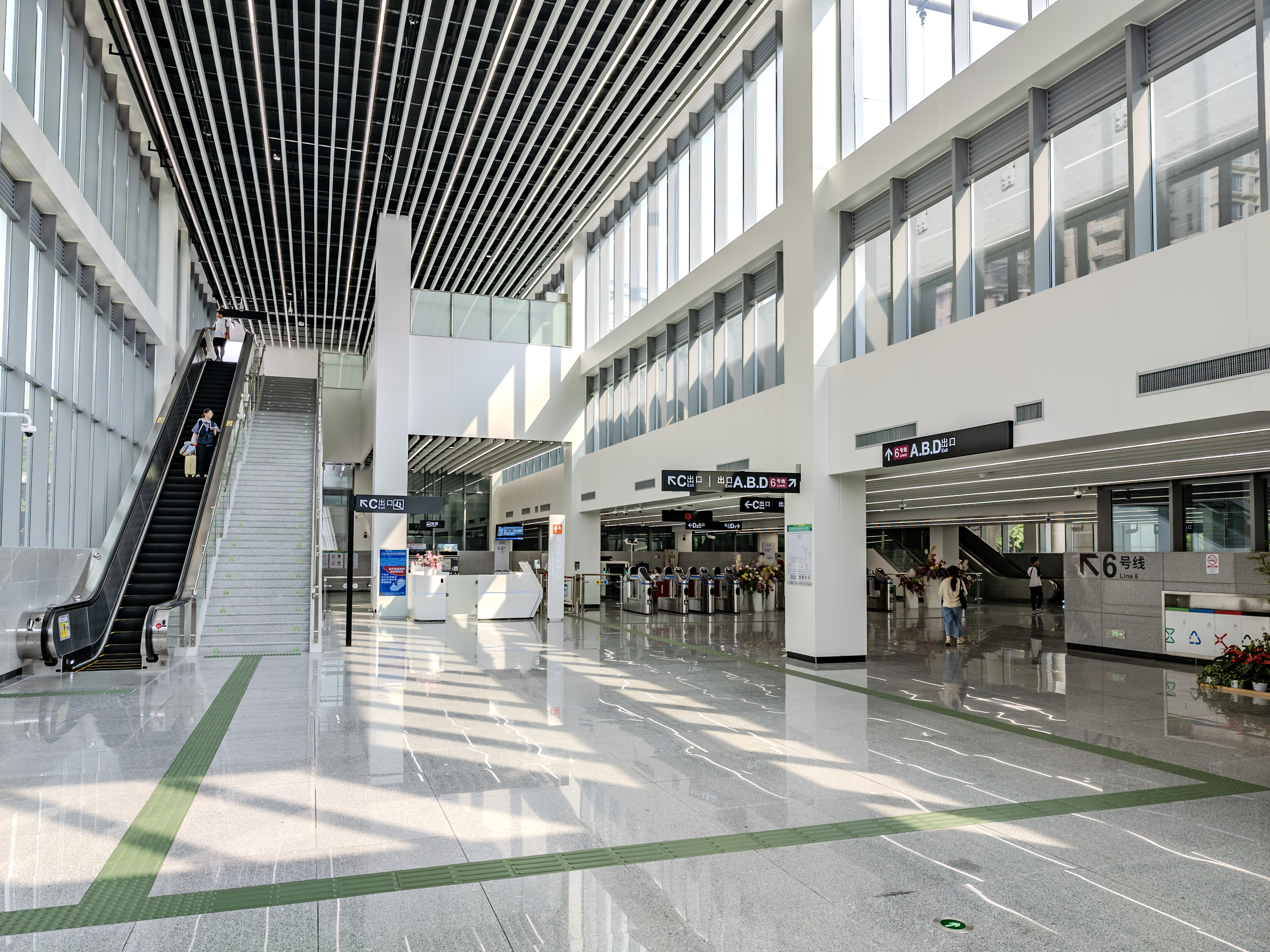
Passenger distribution concourse

=== Platforms ===
The Line 6 station has an island and side platform, located above the east side of Jinshazhou Road. Line 12 has two side platforms and is located under Xunfengshan East Road. The two platforms form an "L" shape that rotates 45 degrees clockwise.

Line 6 only uses the side platform 2 and platform 1 on the island platform. Platform 3 on the other side of the island platform is a standby platform for storing standby trains and diverting traffic during morning and evening rush hours.

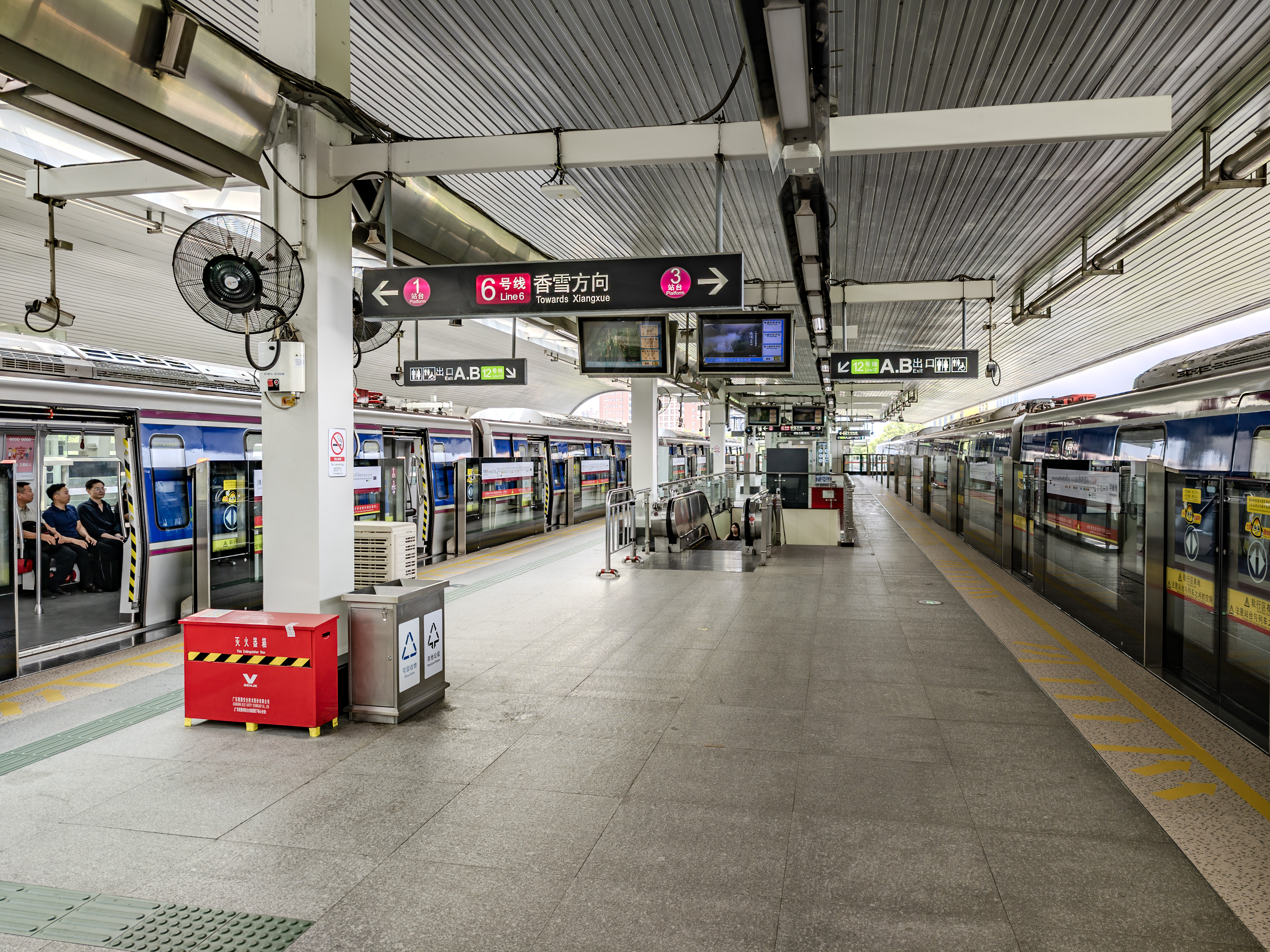
Line 6 platforms 1 and 3 (originating platform)

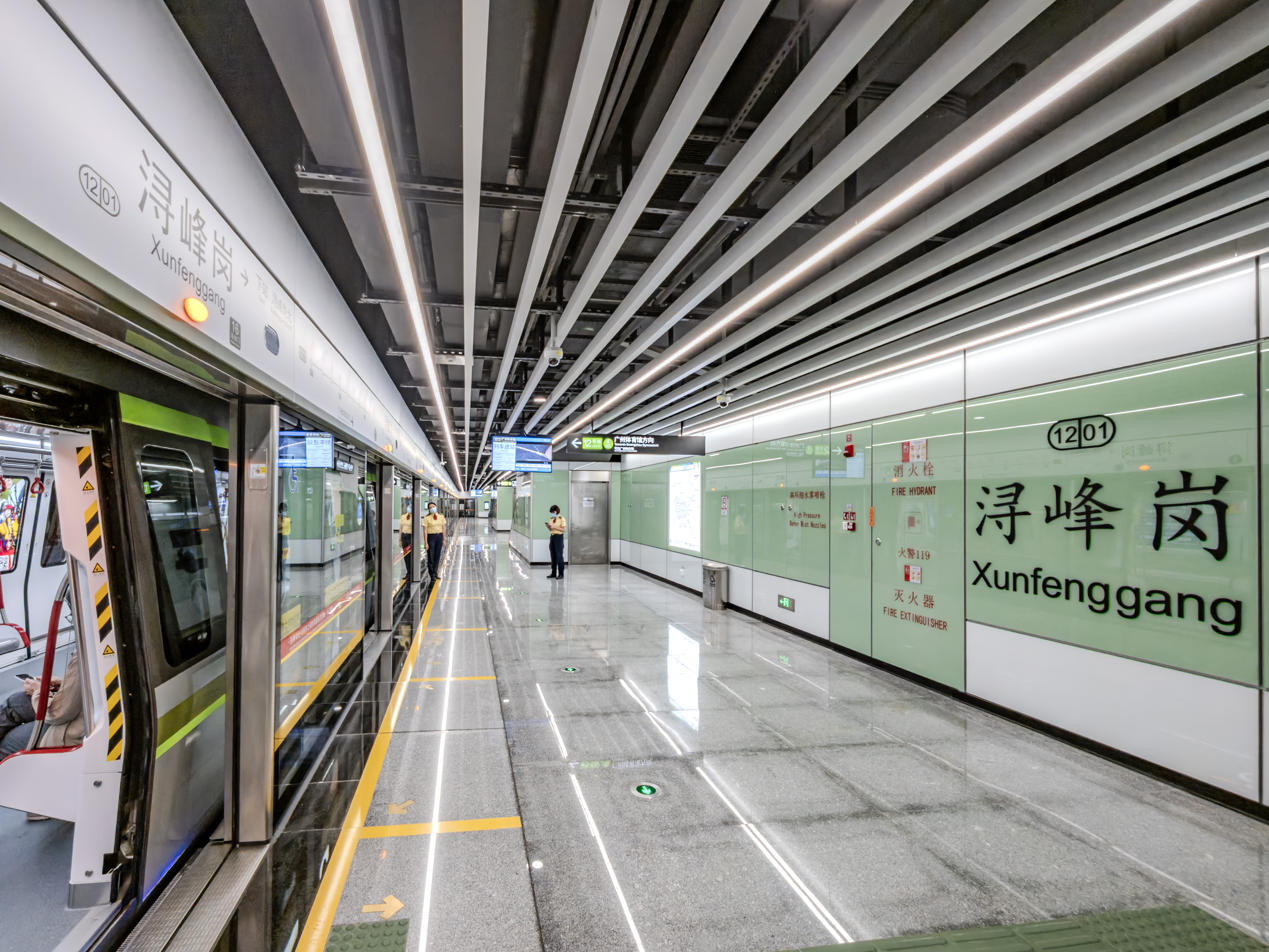
Line 12 platform 4 (originating platform)

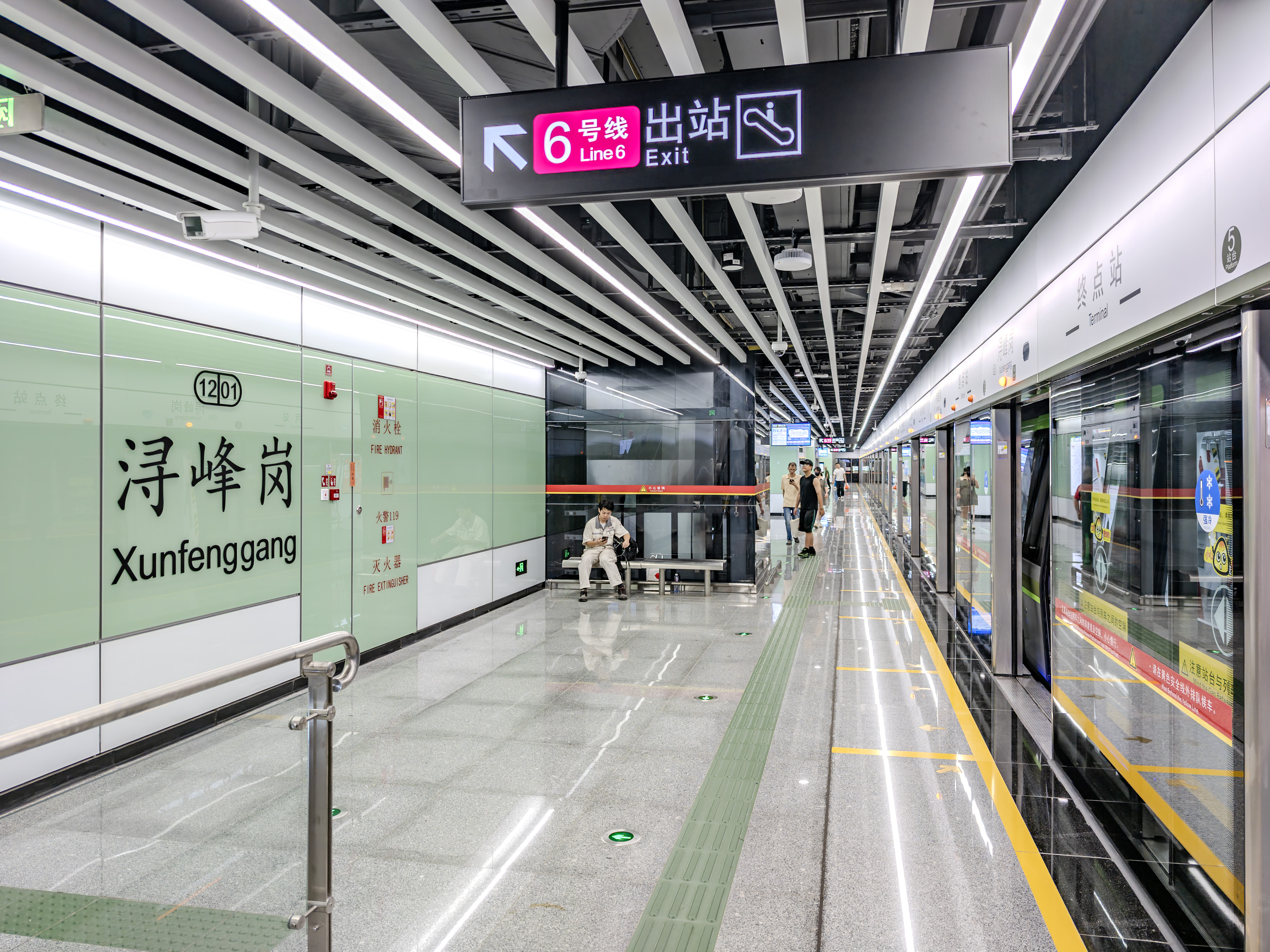
Line 12 platform 5 (termination platform)

==== Line configuration ====
On the southeast side of the Line 6 platforms is a single maneuvering line, which can facilitate switchback before heading into platform 1. There are also several maneuvering lines to the northwest of the platforms arranged in a "figure eight" shape for train turnback. The main line continues to Xunfenggang Stabling Yard as an entry and exit line. Line 12 has a single maneuvering line on the northeast side of the platform for train switchback before the station, and a set of crossing lines on the southwest side for train turnback after the station.

=== Entrances/exits ===
The station has 8 points of entry/exit, distributed between the Line 6 concourse, passenger distribution concourse and Line 12 concourse. It is worth mentioning that Exit C on the north side of Line 6 platform 2 is exit only and directly connects to the pedestrian overpass across Jinshazhou Road. The exit was temporarily closed on 8 November 2024 to facilitate the access works of the transfer passage and was reopened after the opening of Line 12. Exits A, B, D1 and D2 are equipped with ramps.

==== Line 6 concourse (ground level) ====
- A: Jinshazhou Road
- B: Jinshazhou Road

==== Line 6 Platform 2 (third floor above ground) ====
- C: Jinshazhou Road (exiting only)

==== Line 12 concourse (first floor underground) ====
- E: Xunfengshan East Road
- F: Xunfengshan West Road
- H: Xunfengshan East Road

==== Passenger distribution concourse (ground level) ====
- D1: Jinshazhou Road
- D2: Hongci Street
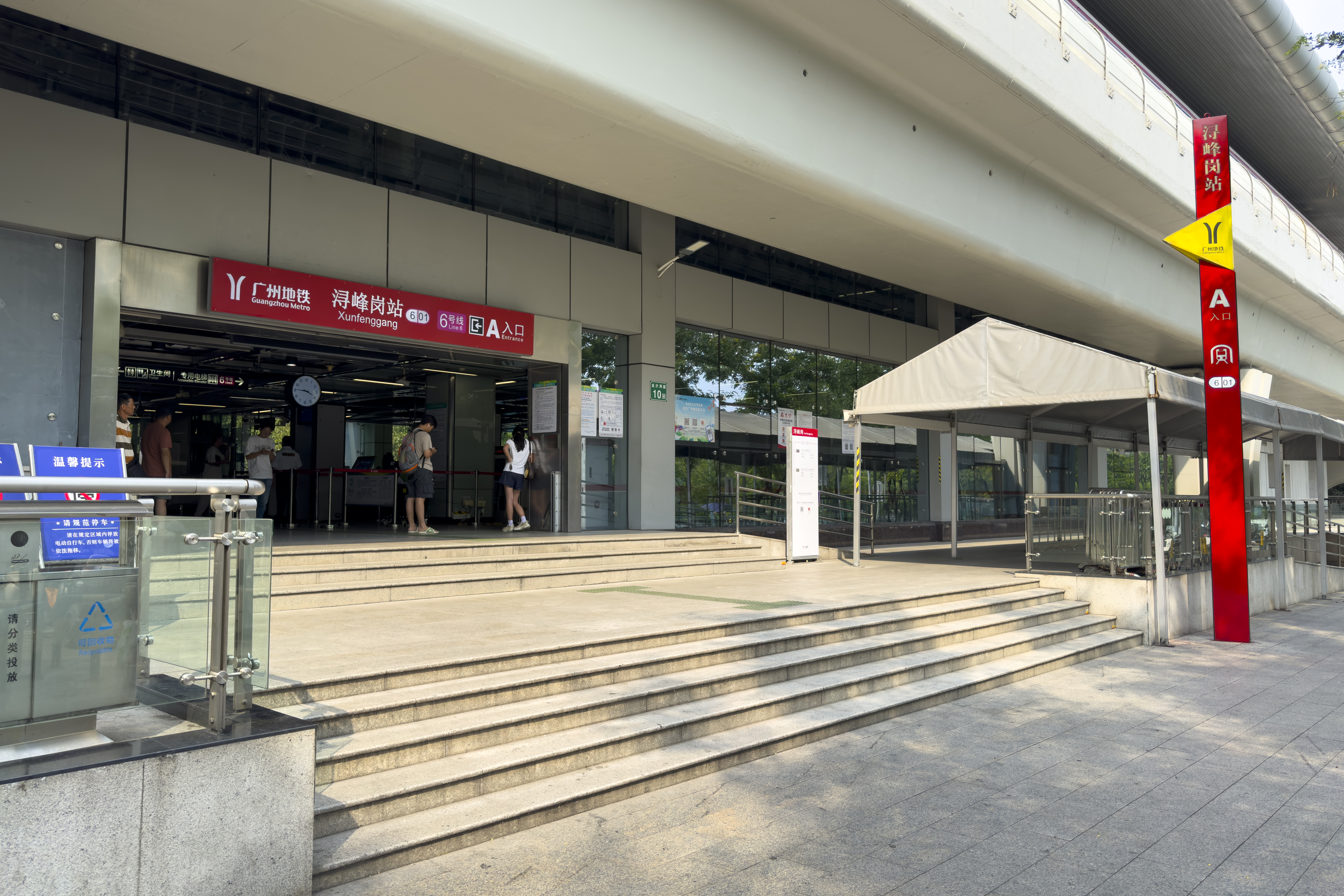
Entrance A

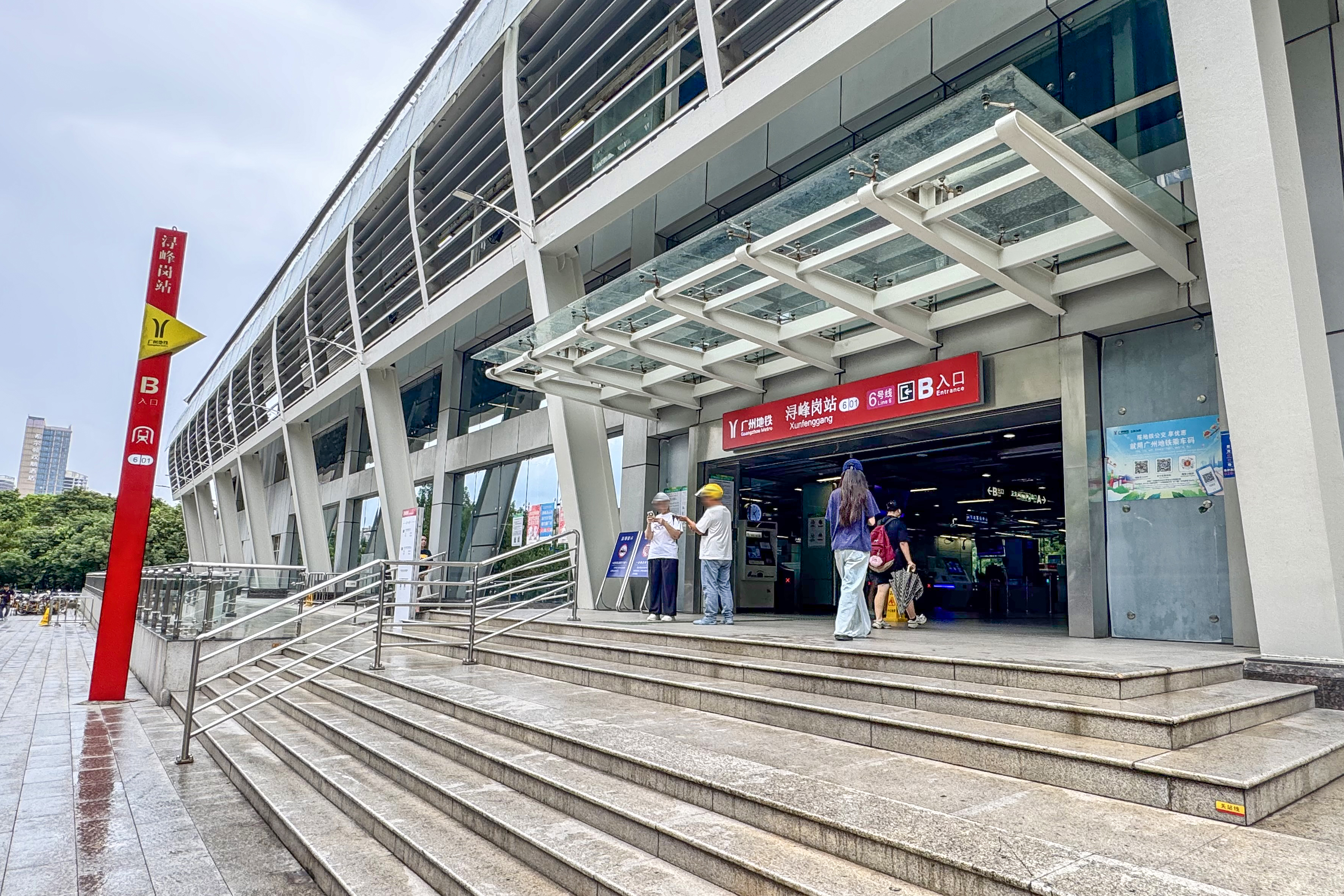
Entrance B

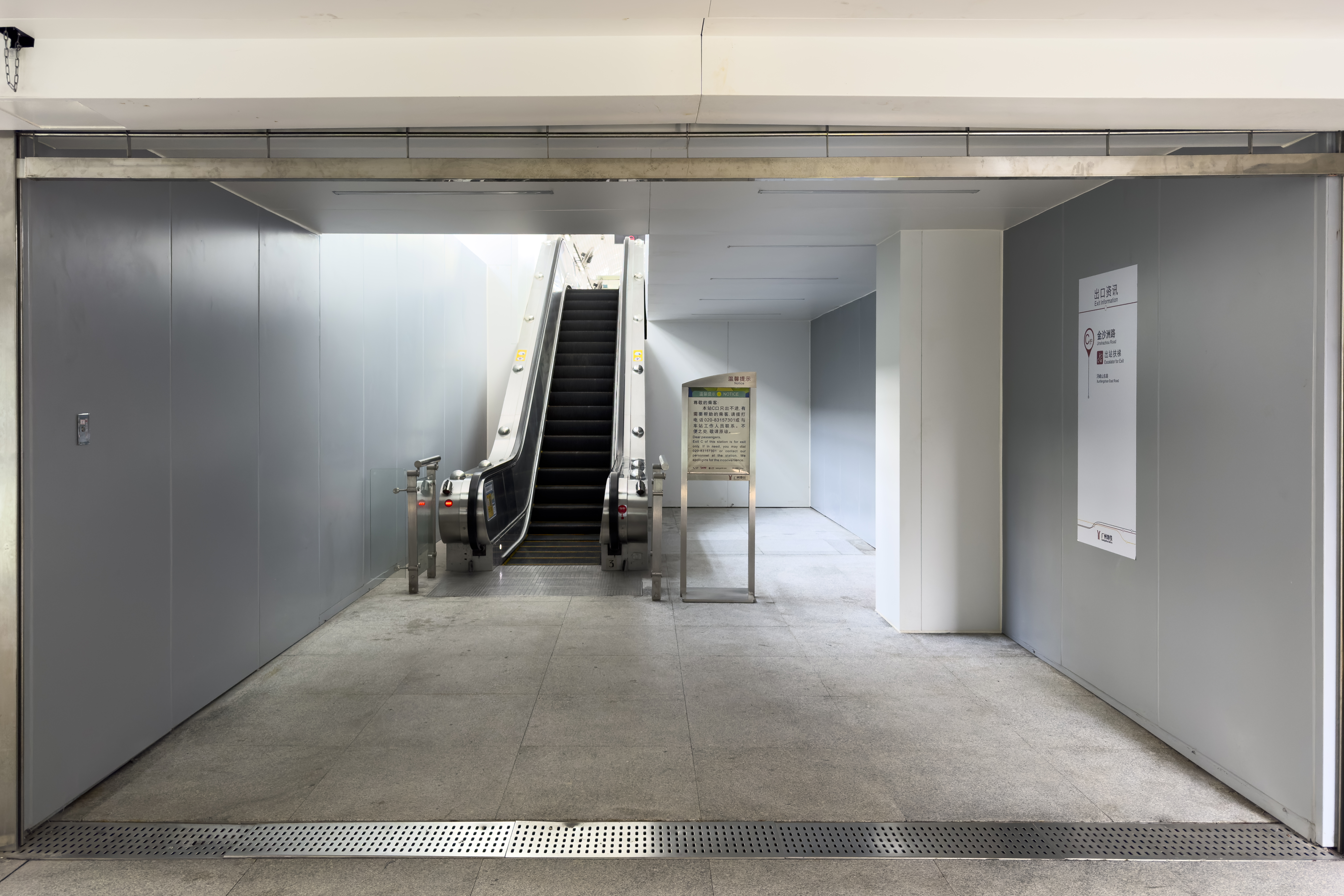
Exit C (exiting only)

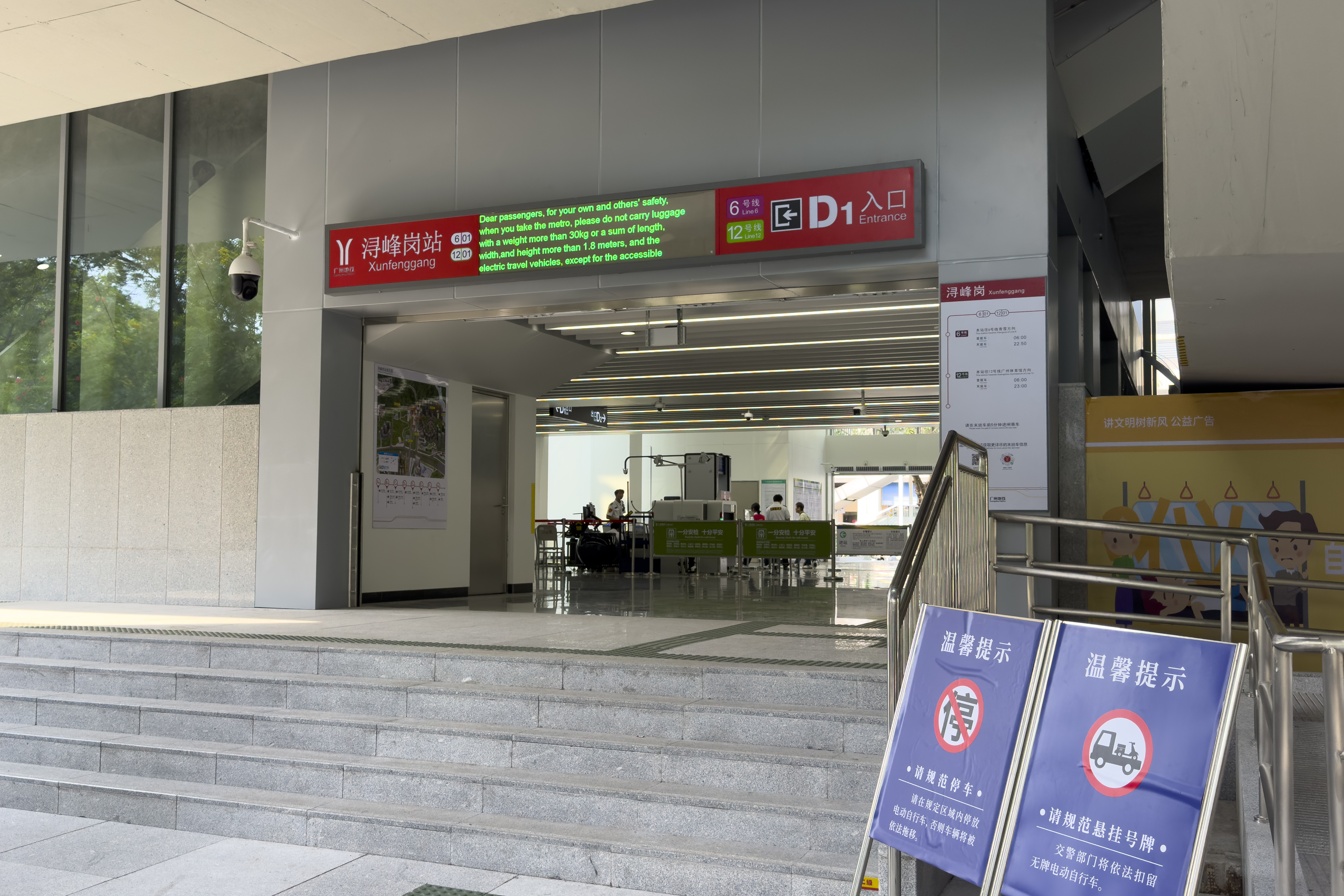
Entrance D1

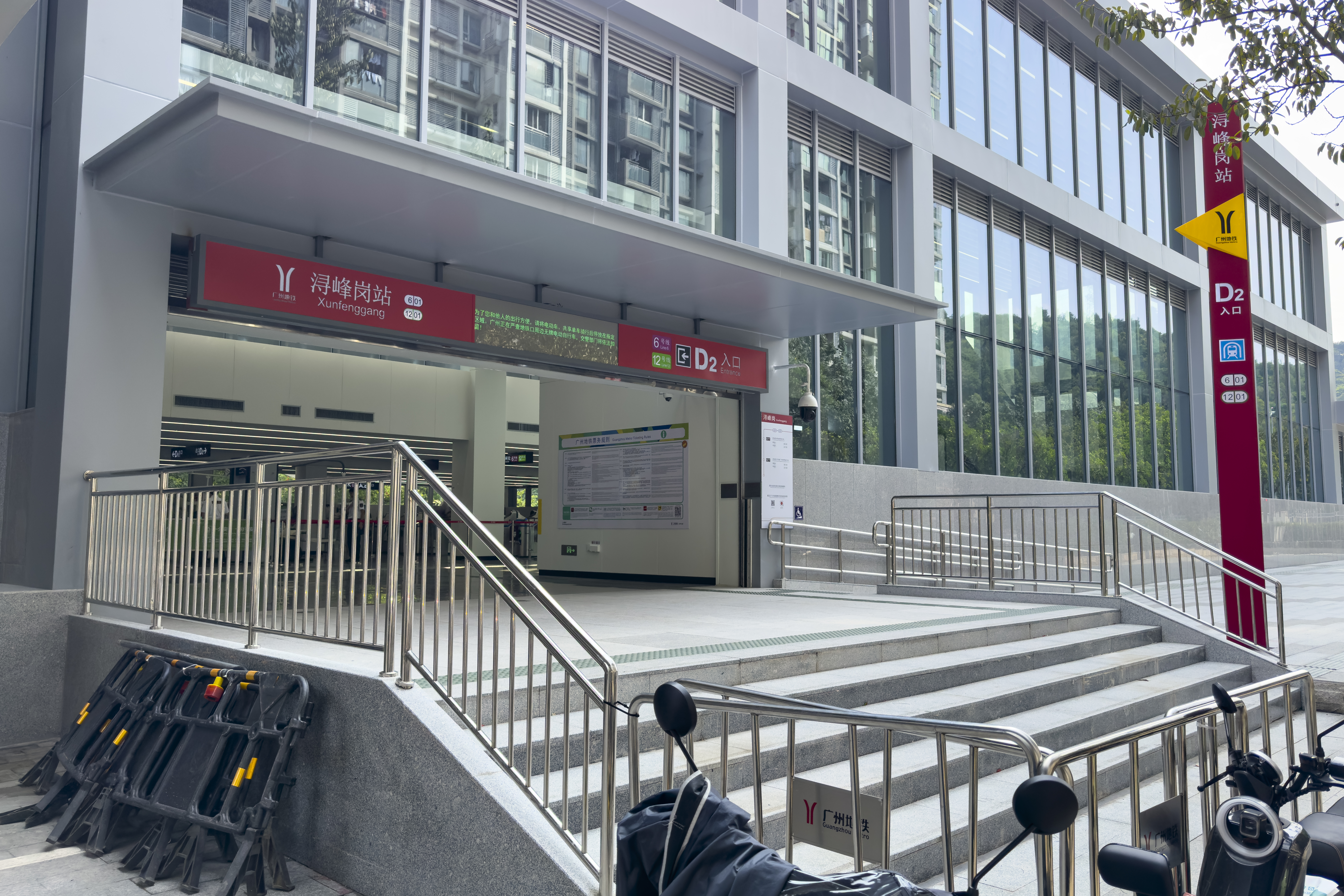
Entrance D2

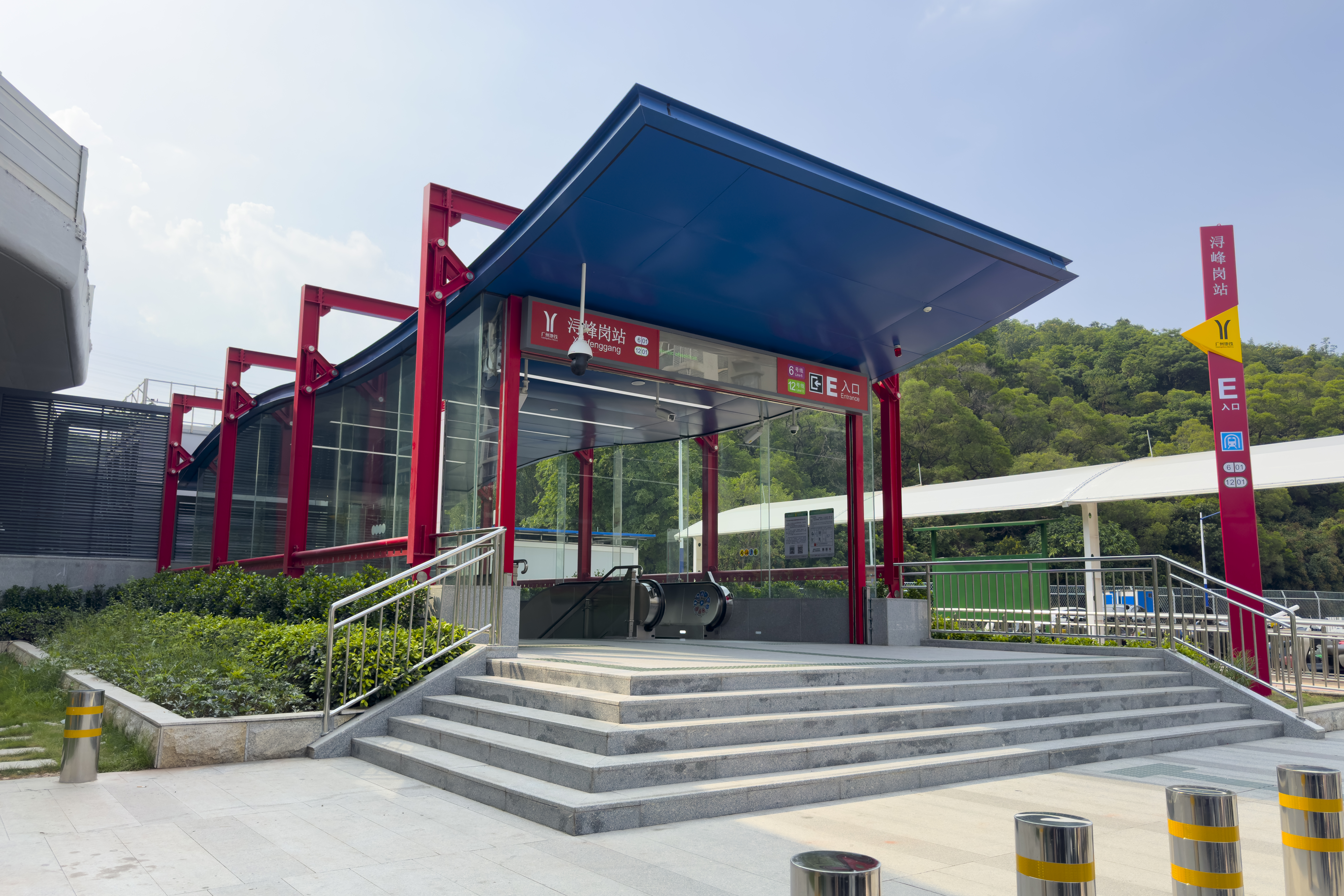
Entrance E

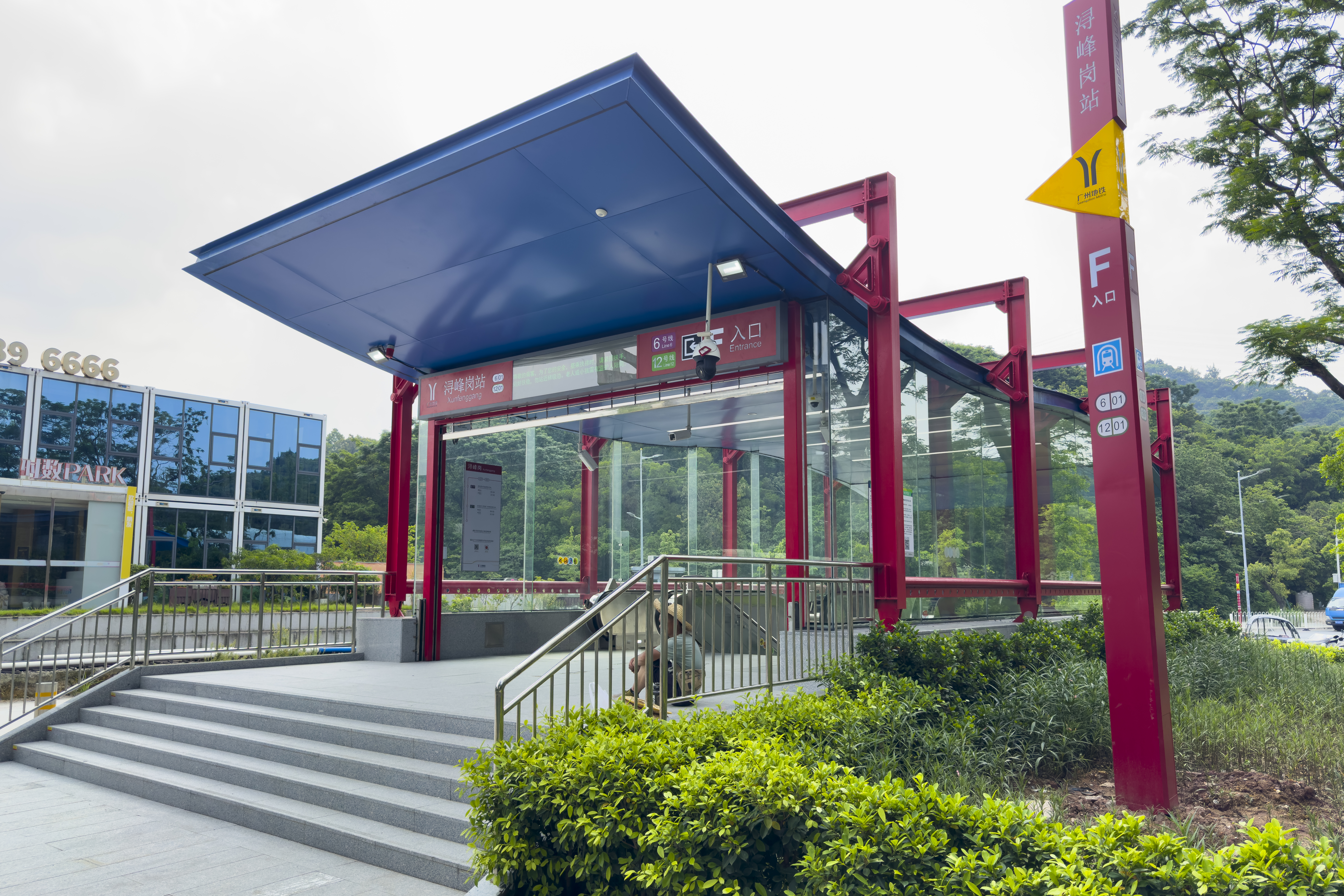
Entrance F

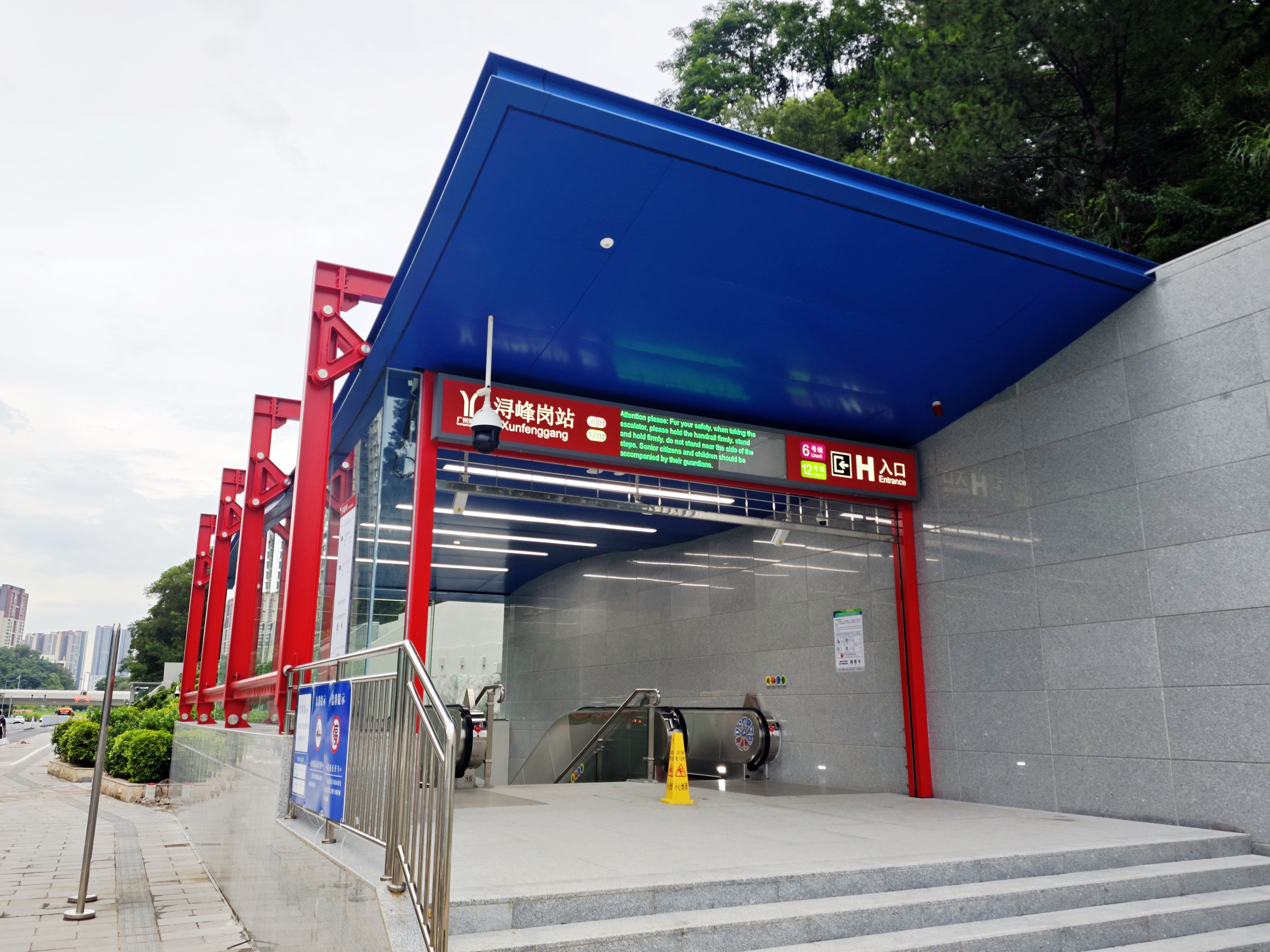
Entrance H

== History ==
=== Planning and construction ===
The station appeared as Line 6's western terminus in the 2003 metro plan, serving the northern part of Jinshazhou. Subsequently, the station was confirmed to be one of the first stations of Line 6 for construction.

The station was originally designed with only one set of side platforms (i.e. platforms 1 and 2, similar to Hengsha and Shabei down the line). However, in the later design of Line 6, a side-line was added to the west side of platform 1, and platform 1 was changed to an island platform (adding the existing platform 3). At the same time, the maneuvering arrangements before and after the station were rearranged to increase the station's turnback capacity and the efficiency of train intervals, thereby increasing the extreme frequency density of Line 6 as much as possible.

On 15 January 2013, the Line 6 station completed the "three rights" transfer. On 28 December the same year, the station was opened with the official opening of Line 6's initial phase.

Line 6 trains have only four carriages, and the operating capacity cannot meet the future demand for passenger flow between Jinshazhou and the city center. In the latest version of the Jinshazhou area plan approved by the Municipal Planning Commission in May 2014, Line 12 which was originally planned to be extended to Lishui was diverted to this station, and intersected with Line 6 to set up an interchange in order to ease the passenger flow in the Jinshazhou area.

On 28 February 2025, the Line 12 station completed the "three rights" transfer. On 29 June the same year, the station was opened.

=== Operational incident ===
During COVID-19 pandemic control rules in 2022, the station was suspended from 21 to 27 November 2022.

== See also ==
- Xunfenggang North station, another Guangzhou Metro Line 12 station, north of Xunfenggang
