= Jinshazhou =

Island in Guangdong, China

Coordinates: 23°09′03″N 113°12′00″E

Jinshazhou (Chinese: 金沙洲) is an island between Guangzhou and Foshan in Guangdong, China. It covers the total area of about 27 square kilometres. Touted as the metropolis of Guangzhou and Foshan, Jinshazhou is located in northwest Guangzhou, with Baisha River on its east, and Lishui (Chinese: 里水), Zhoucun (Chinese: 洲村), Baishacun (Chinese: 白沙村) of Nanhai District, Foshan on its north, west and south.

The island is administrated by both Baiyun District of Guangzhou and Huangqi (Chinese: 黄歧) and Lishui of Nanhai District, Foshan. Its western part which belongs to Guangzhou occupies about 1/3 of its total area (i.e. about 9 square kilometres). This part has been one of the large-scale development zones in Guangzhou.

== Historical sites and landmarks ==
=== King Kong Temple ===
The sixth largest jungle in Guangzhou, formerly known as Dongyue Temple, was built at the end of the Yuan Dynasty and the beginning of the Ming Dynasty. It is an important place for Buddhist culture.

Address: No. 46, Hengwu Lane, Shafengzhong Village, Jinshazhou, Baiyun District, Guangzhou

Opening hours: 9:00 a.m. to 5:00 p.m.

Tickets: free of charge

=== Ancestral Hall of Dr. Chen Mingxian of the Song Dynasty (宋名贤陈大夫宗祠) ===
Address: No.38, Zhongyuanli Street, Baiyun District.

Open time: 9:00 a.m. to 5:00 p.m..

It was built during the Ming Jiajing period, rebuilt during the Qingdao Light Year, and rebuilt in 1927. The name of the temple is to commemorate the name of Dr. Chen Ziqiang. The locals call it the Siddhartha Hall. Covering an area of about 795 square meters, sitting north to south, the middle hall hung "Shide Hall" and the Qing court gave Chen Zizhang "loyal Jane" plaque. There is a statue of Chen Zizhang in the middle of the back hall. Behind the wall on the left is a monument to Song Mingxian Chen's ancestral shrine. On the right side of the garden is the garden of Eden, which is the garden of Eden. Later people called Chen Zizhuang and Shunde Chen Bangyan and Dongguan Zhang Jiayu "three loyalties of Lingnan at the end of the Ming Dynasty." Guangzhou Cultural Heritage Protection Unit.0.
