= Shapu Station =

Shapu Station may refer to:

- Shuanggang station (Guangzhou Metro), a station on Line 13 of Guangzhou Metro (previous planning name "Shapu Station")
- Shapu railway station, a railway station of Guangshen Railway
