= Shuangsha station =

Guangzhou Metro Line 5 station

Shuangsha 双沙
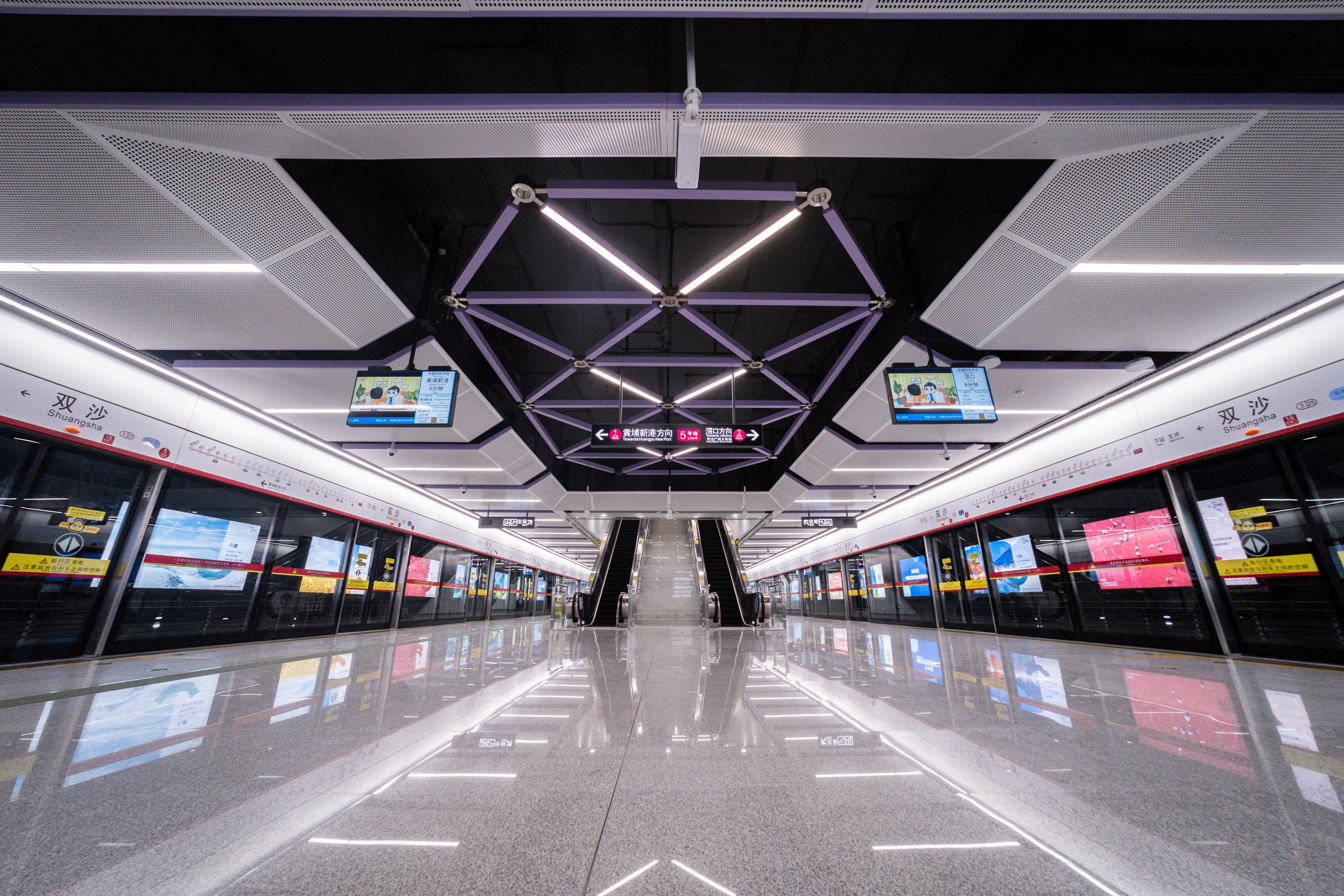
- Platform

Chinese name
- Simplified Chinese: 双沙站
- Traditional Chinese: 雙沙站
Transcriptions
Standard Mandarin
- Hanyu Pinyin: Shuāngshā Zhàn
Yue: Cantonese
- Yale Romanization: Seūhngsāa Jaahm
- Jyutping: Soeng^{1}saa^{1} Zaam^{6}

General information
- Location: Intersection of Xinhua Road (信华路) and Fuxing Road (富兴路); Huangpu District, Guangzhou, Guangdong; China
- Coordinates: 23°6′1.87″N 113°28′43.93″E
- Operator: Guangzhou Metro Co. Ltd.
- Line: Line 5
- Platforms: 2 (1 island platform)
- Tracks: 2

Construction
- Structure type: Underground
- Accessible: Yes

Other information
- Station code: 525

History
- Opened: 28 December 2023 (2 years ago)
- Former names: Shuanggang (双岗)

Services
Preceding station	Guangzhou Metro	Following station
Wenchong towards Jiaokou	Line 5	Miaotou towards Huangpu New Port
Location

Shuangsha station (simplified Chinese: 双沙站; traditional Chinese: 雙沙站; pinyin: Shuāngshā Zhàn; Cantonese Yale: Seūhngsāa Jaahm) is a station on Line 5 of the Guangzhou Metro. It is located under the intersection of Xinhua Road (信华路) and Fuxing Road (复兴路) in Huangpu District. It opened on 28 December 2023, with the opening of the eastern extension of the line.

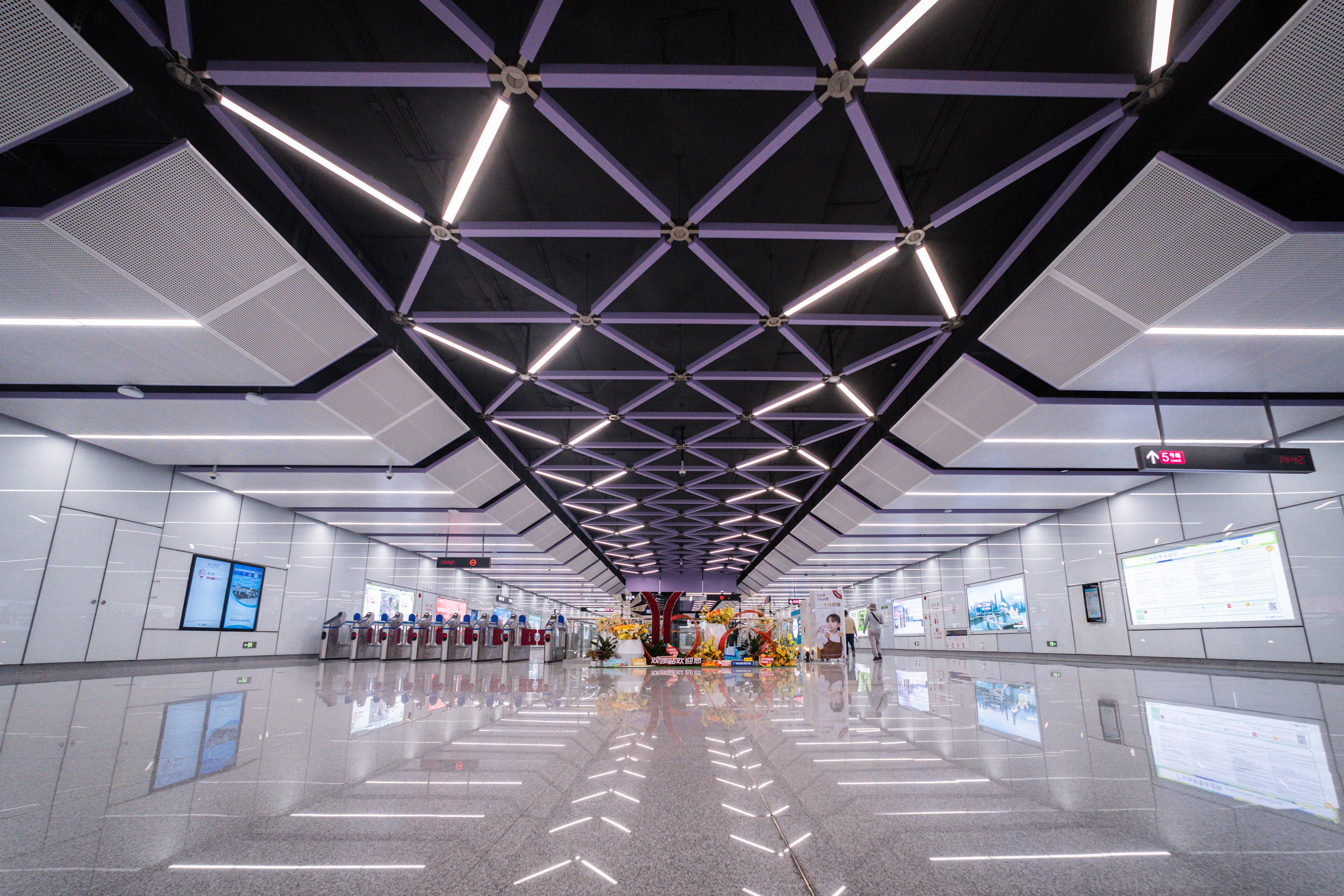
Concourse

== Station layout ==
G	Street level	Exits B, D
L1; Concourse	Lobby	Ticket Machines, Customer Service, Shops, Police Station, Safety Facilities
L2; Platforms	Platform 2	5 towards Jiaokou (Wenchong)
L2; Platforms	Island platform, doors will open on the left (Toilets, Nursery)
L2; Platforms	Platform 1	5 towards Huangpu New Port (Miaotou)

=== Entrances/exits ===
The station has 2 points of entry/exit. Exit B is equipped with an elevator.

- B: Fuxing Road
- D: Xinhua Road
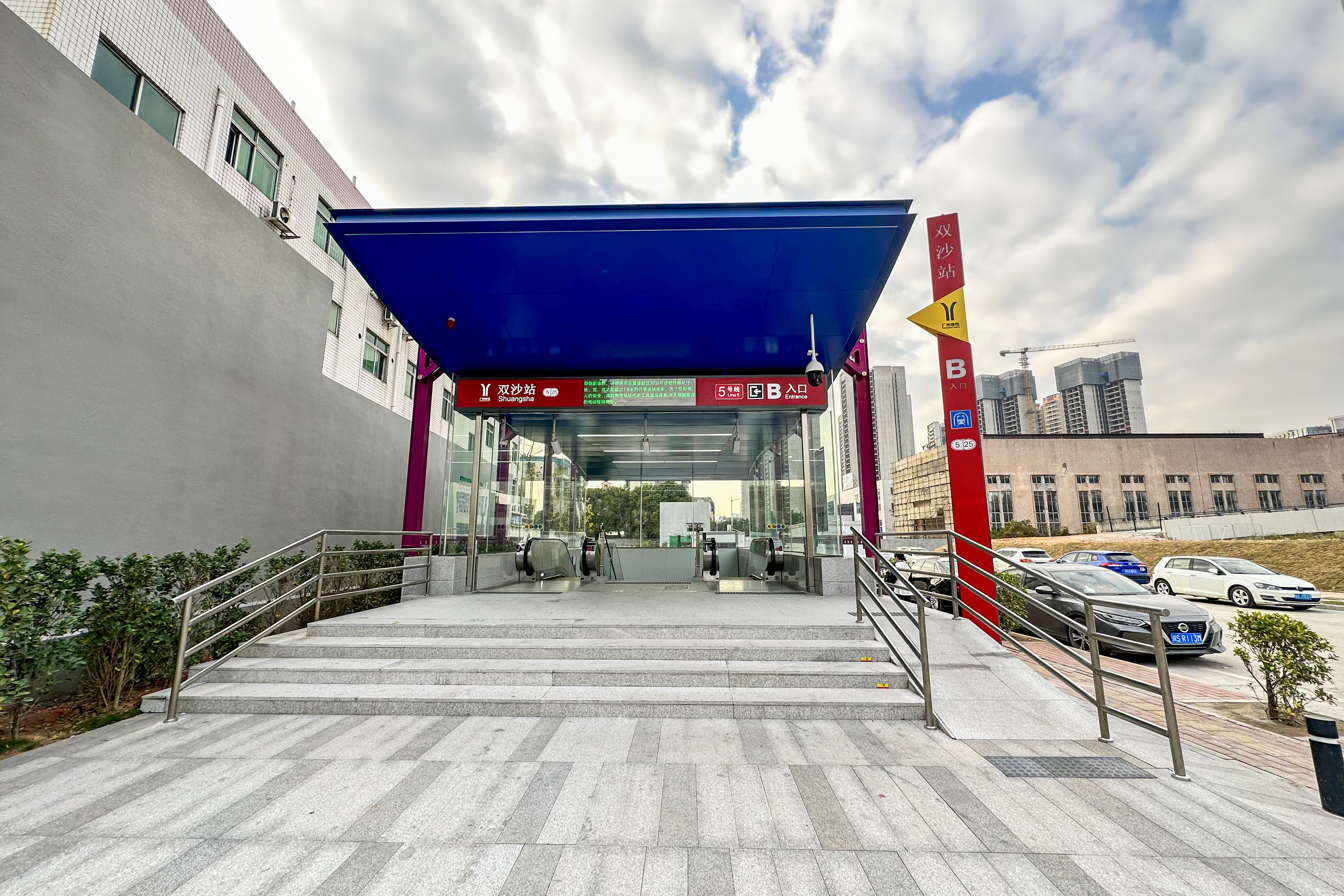
Entrance B

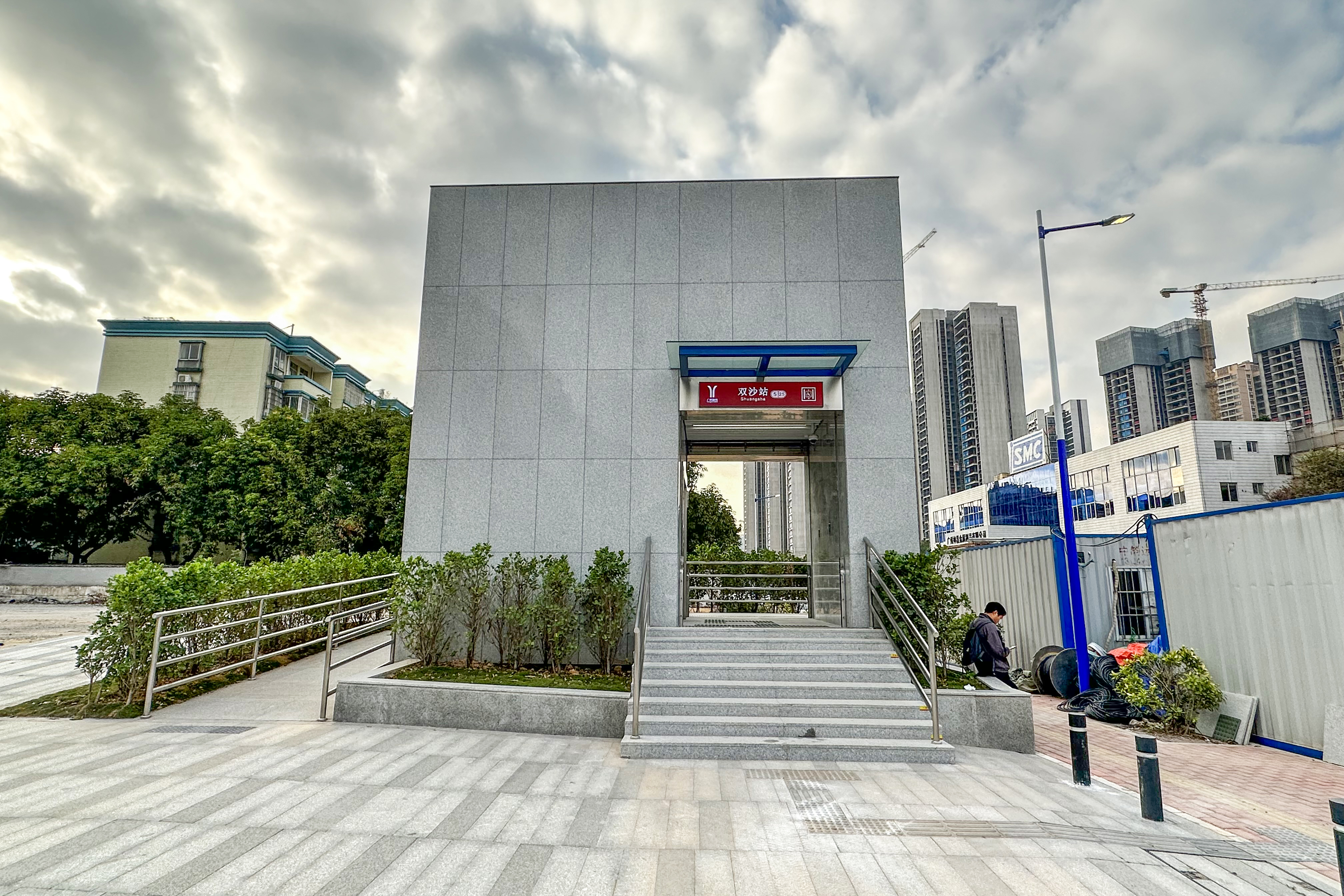
Entrance B (elevator entrance)

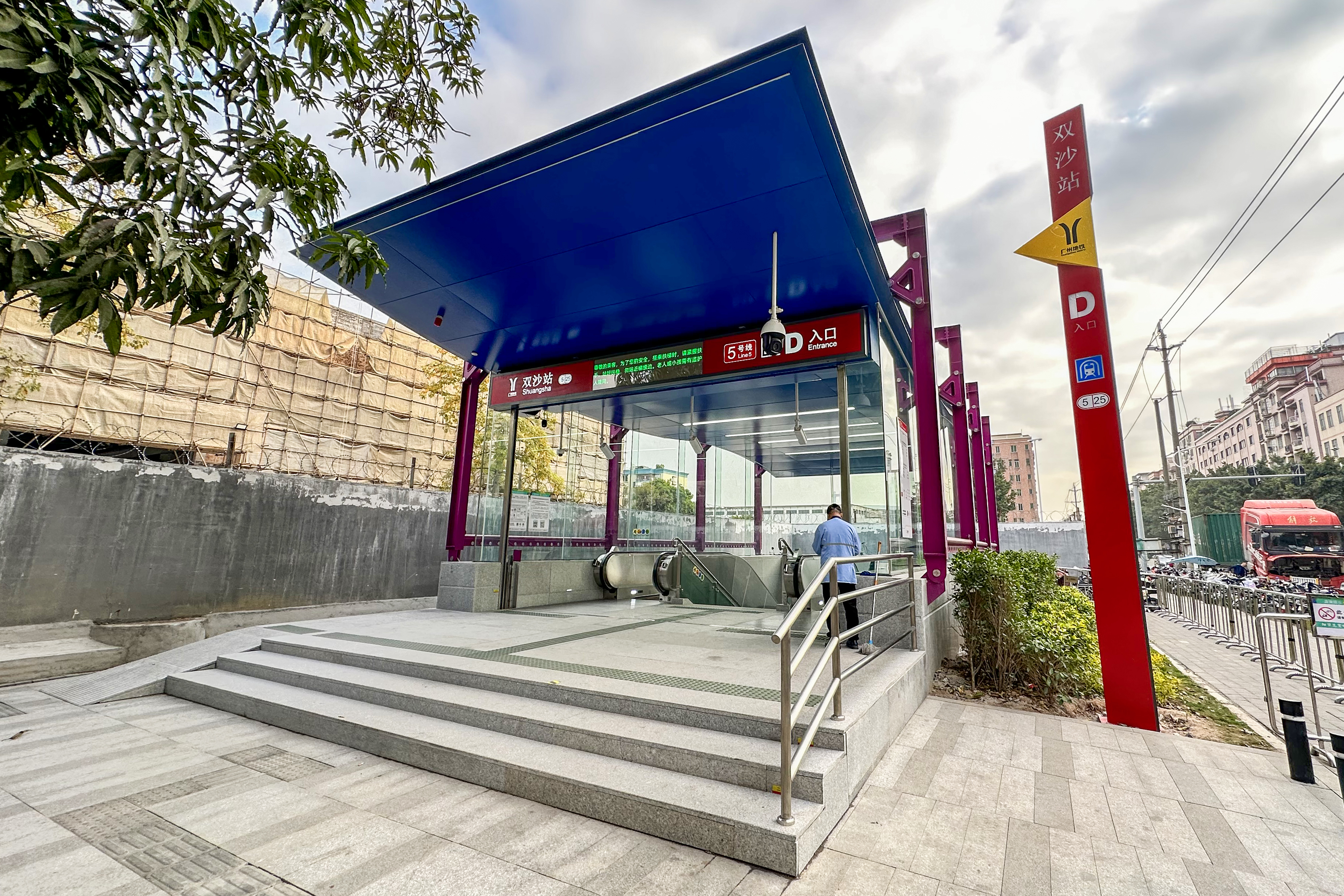
Entrance D

== History ==
In April 2022, the section from this station to Miaotou Lu (Miaotou) in the eastern extension of Line 5 was completed, and it is also the longest shield tunnel section in the whole extension.

During the planning phase, this station was called Shuanggang station. Before Wenyuan station was opened on Line 13, it was renamed to Shuanggang station, which conflicted with the name of this station. The two stations are in different locations, and it is not possible to build a transfer. On 27 February 2023, the Guangzhou Civil Affairs Bureau announced the initial names of stations on the east extension of Line 5, and this station was renamed to Shuangsha station. The station opened on 28 December 2023 along with the eastern extension of Line 5.
