= Xiayuan station (Guangzhou Metro) =

Guangzhou Metro Line 5 and Line 13 station

Xiayuan 夏园
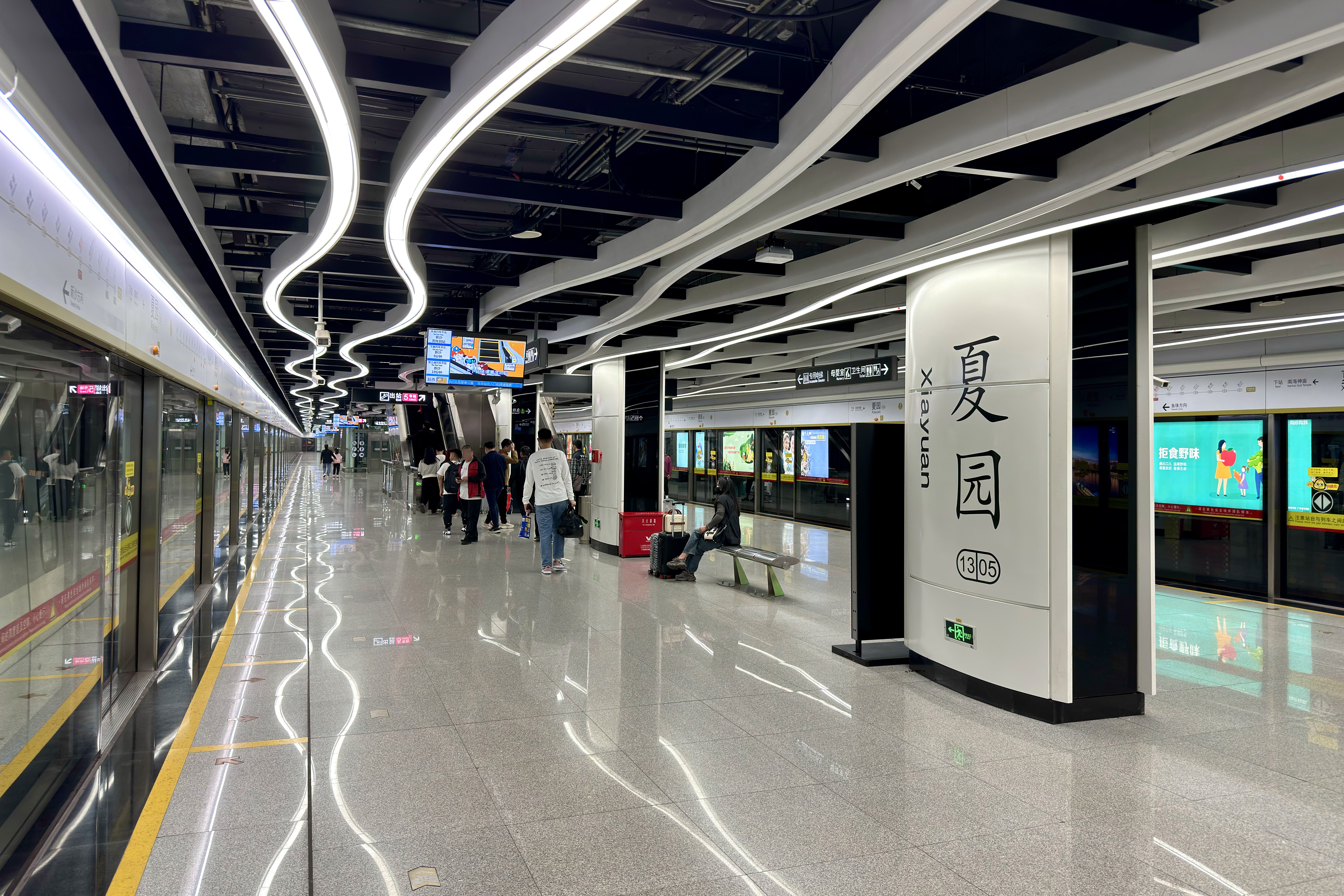
- Line 13 platform

Chinese name
- Simplified Chinese: 夏园站
- Traditional Chinese: 夏園站
Transcriptions
Standard Mandarin
- Hanyu Pinyin: Xiàyuán Zhàn
Yue: Cantonese
- Yale Romanization: Hahyùhn Jaahm
- Jyutping: Haa^{6}jyun^{4} Zaam^{6}

General information
- Location: East Huangpu Road (G107); Huangpu District, Guangzhou, Guangdong; China
- Coordinates: 23°04′59.06″N 113°31′05.35″E
- Operator: Guangzhou Metro Co. Ltd.
- Lines: Line 5; Line 13
- Platforms: 4 (2 island platforms)
- Tracks: 4

Construction
- Structure type: Underground
- Accessible: Yes

Other information
- Station code: 527 1328

History
- Opened: Line 13: 28 December 2017 (8 years ago); Line 5: 28 December 2023 (2 years ago)

Services
Preceding station	Guangzhou Metro	Following station
Miaotou towards Jiaokou	Line 5	Baoying Dadao towards Huangpu New Port
Nanhai God Temple towards Tianhe Park	Line 13	Nangang towards Xinsha
Location

Xiayuan station (simplified Chinese: 夏园站; traditional Chinese: 夏園站; pinyin: Xiàyuán Zhàn; Cantonese Yale: Hahyùhn Jaahm) is an interchange station between Line 5 and Line 13 of the Guangzhou Metro, located in Guangzhou's Huangpu District. Line 13 opened on 28 December 2017, whilst Line 5 opened on 28 December 2023.

== Station layout ==
G	-	Exits A-D
L1; Concourse	Lobby	Ticket Machines, Customer Service, Shops, Police Station, Safety Facilities
L2; Platforms	Platform 4	13 towards Tianhe Park (Nanhai God Temple)
L2; Platforms	Island platform, doors will open on the left (Toilets, Nursery)
L2; Platforms	Platform 3	13 towards Xinsha (Nangang)
L2; Platforms	Platform 2	5 towards Jiaokou (Miaotou)
L2; Platforms	Island platform, doors will open on the left (Toilets, Nursery)
L2; Platforms	Platform 1	5 towards Huangpu New Port (Baoying Dadao)

=== Entrances/exits ===
The station has 4 points of entry/exit. Exit B is equipped with an elevator.

- A: Huangpu East Road, BRT Xiayuan Station
- B: Huangpu East Road
- C: Huangpu East Road
- D: Huangpu East Road, BRT Xiayuan Station
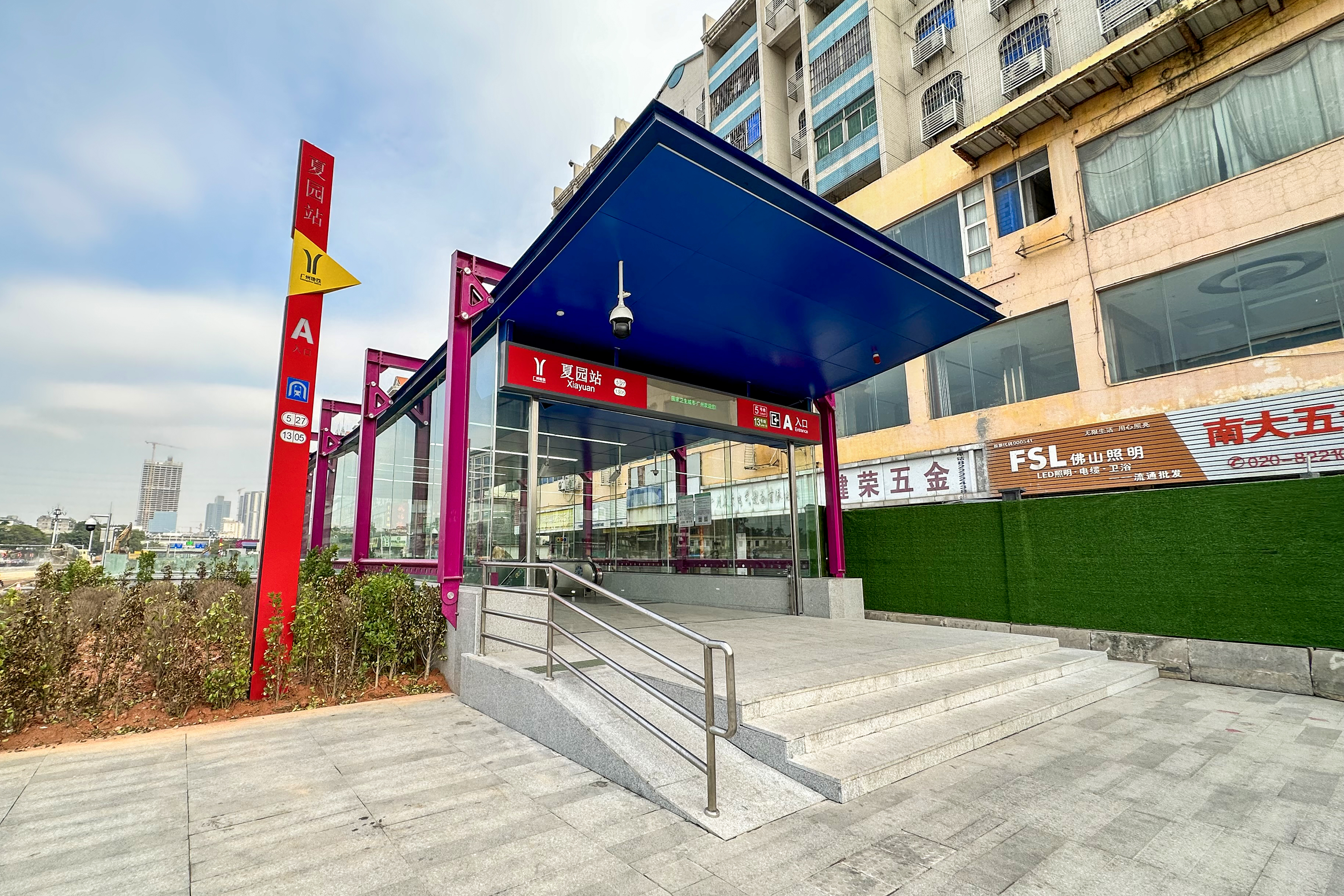
Entrance A

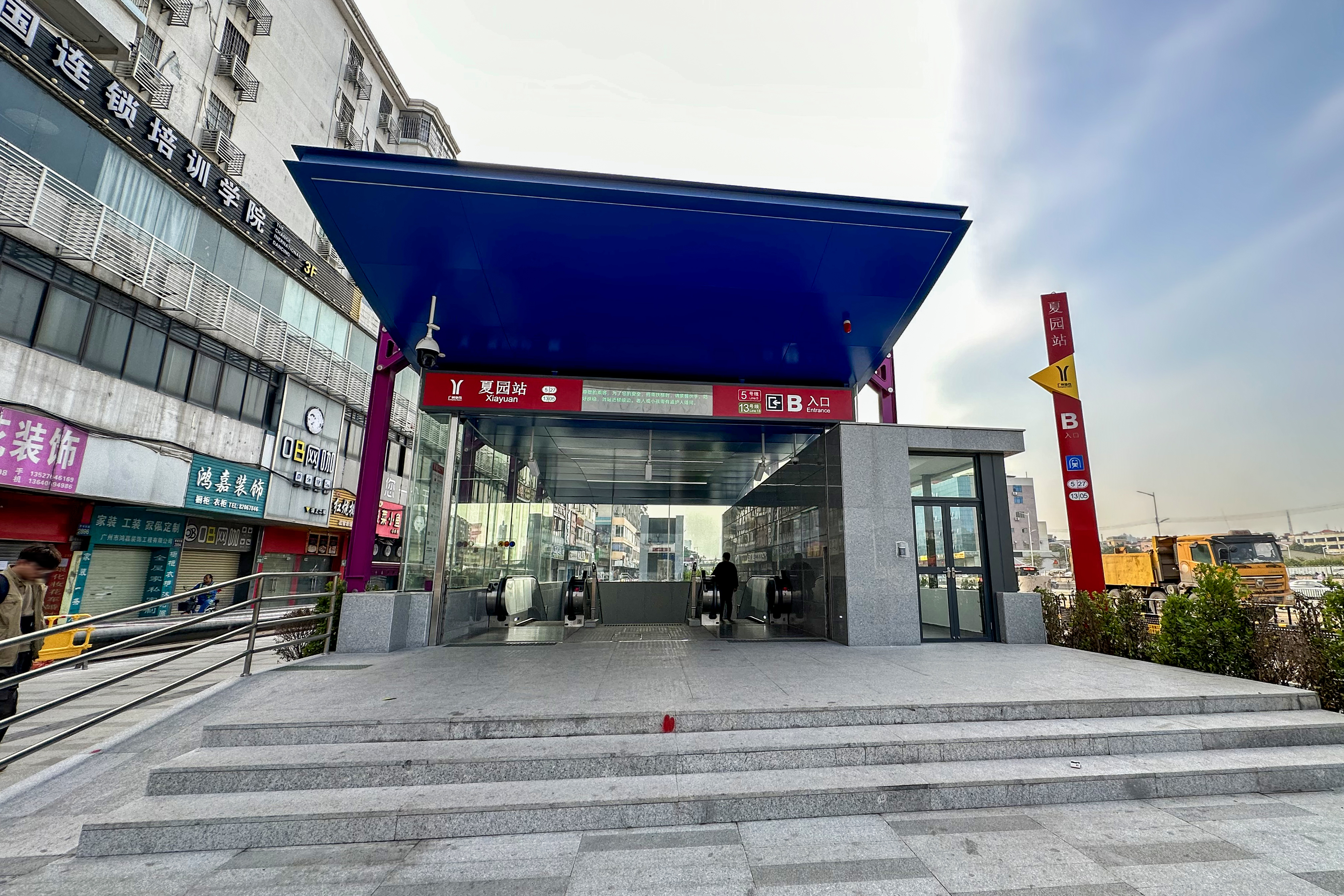
Entrance B

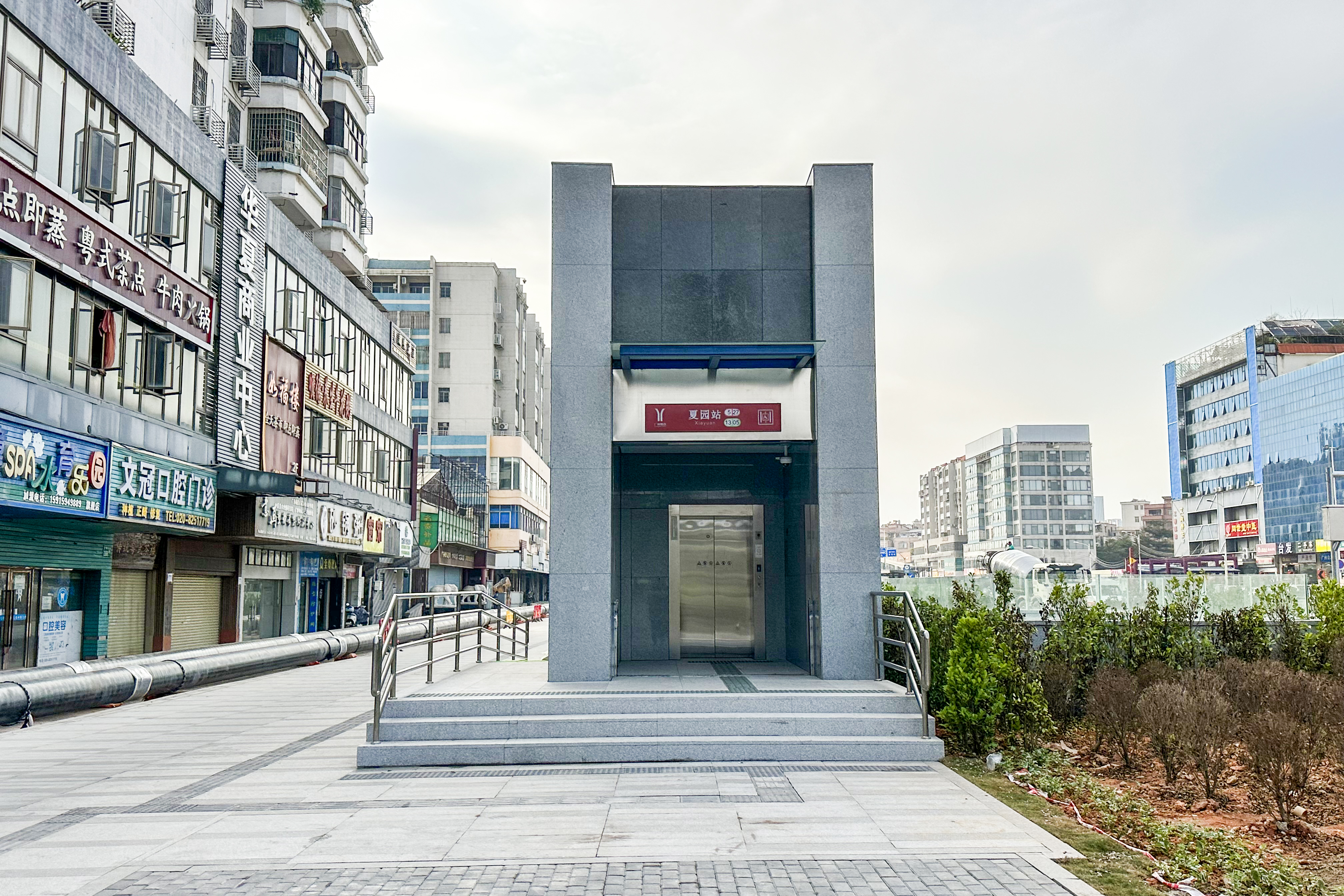
Entrance B (elevator entrance)

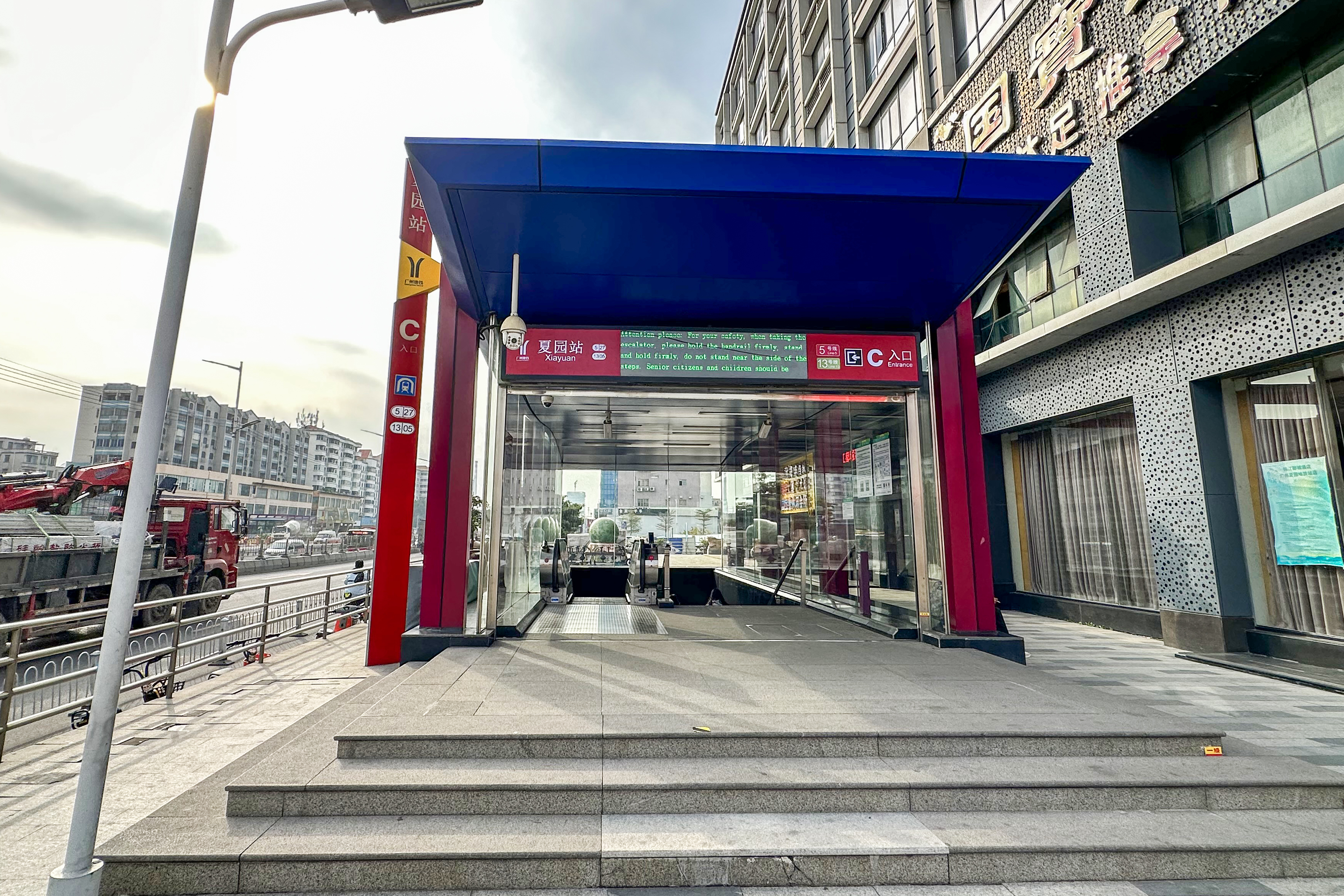
Entrance C

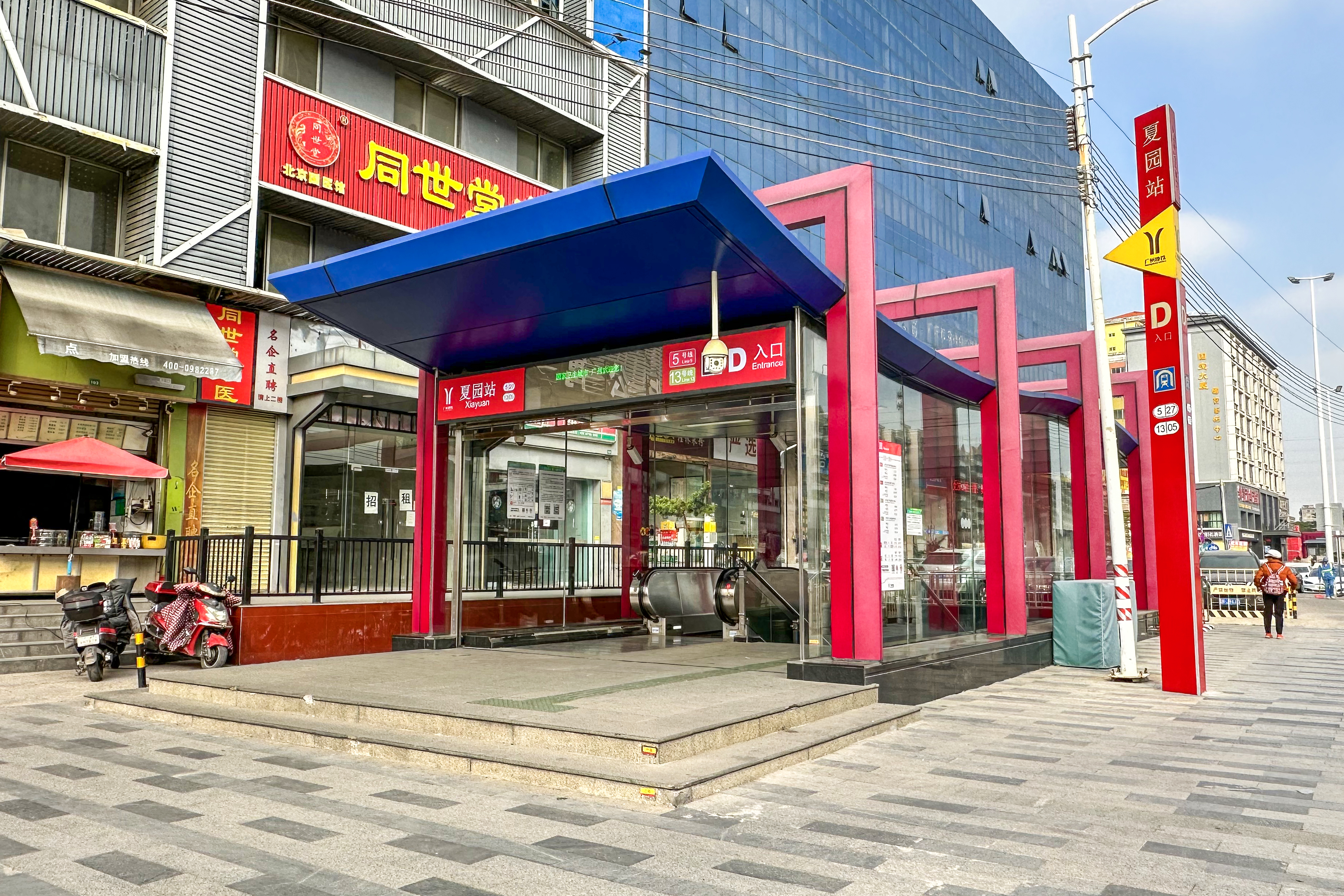
Entrance D

== Gallery ==
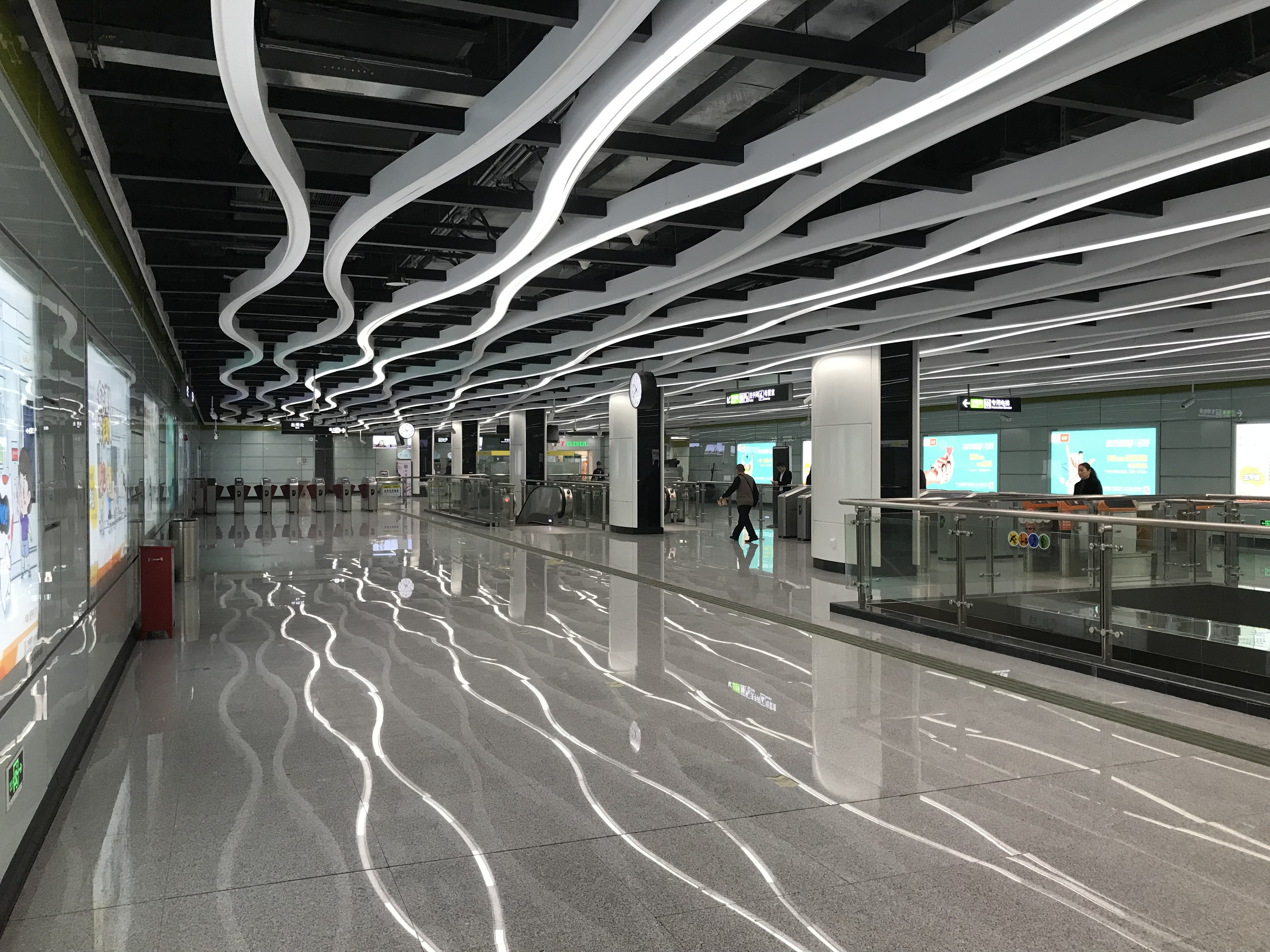
Line 13 concourse

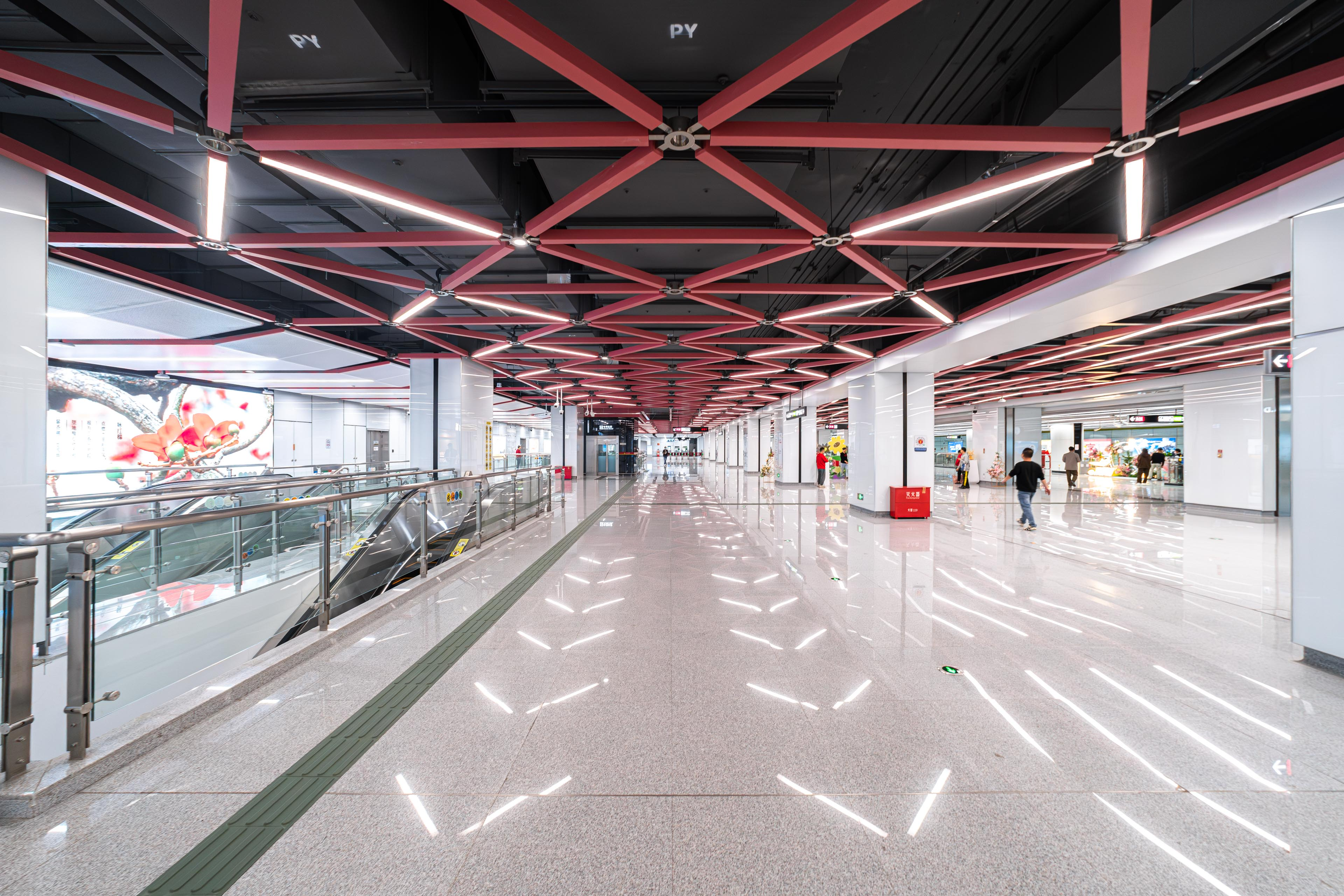
Line 5 concourse

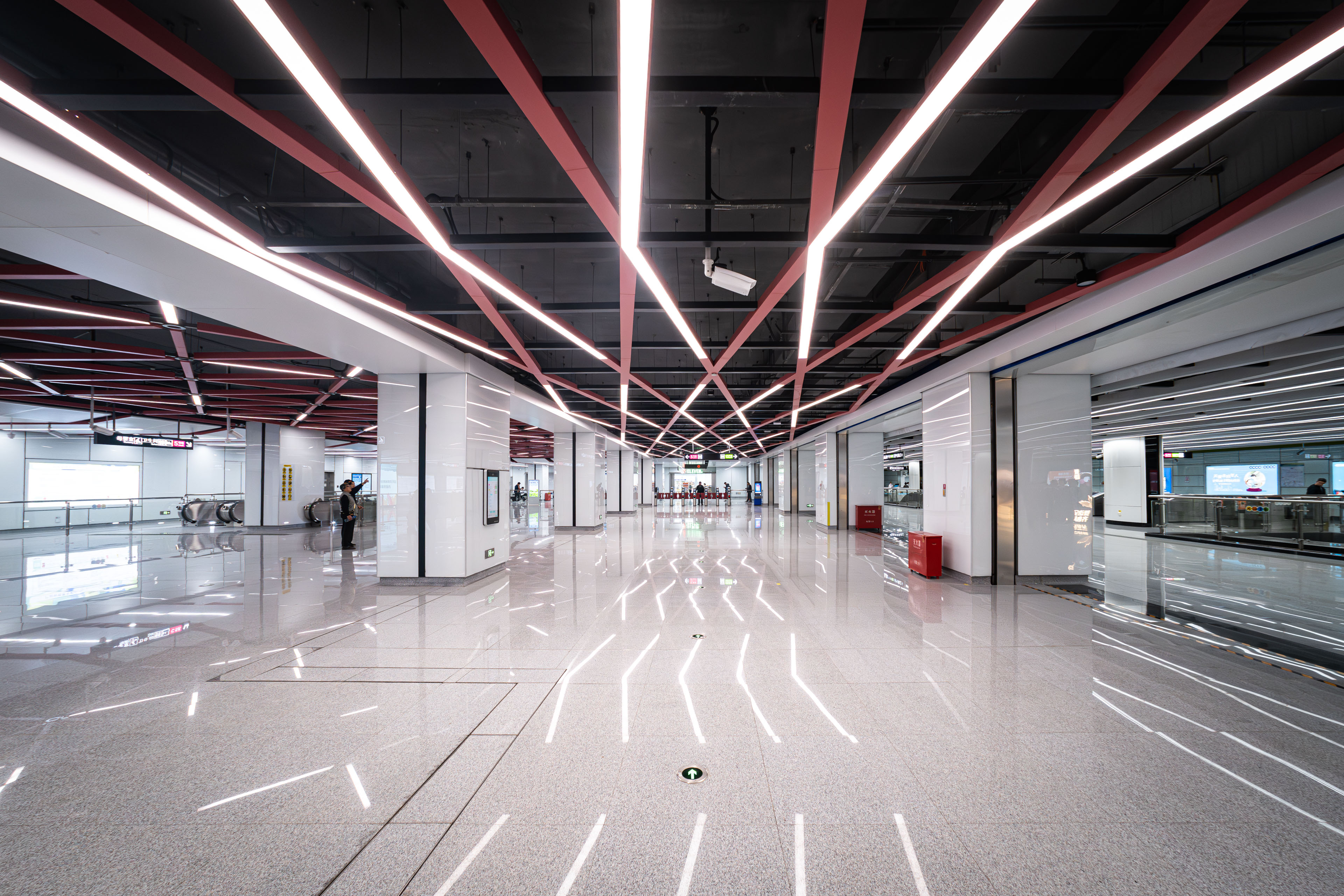
Line 5 transfer section

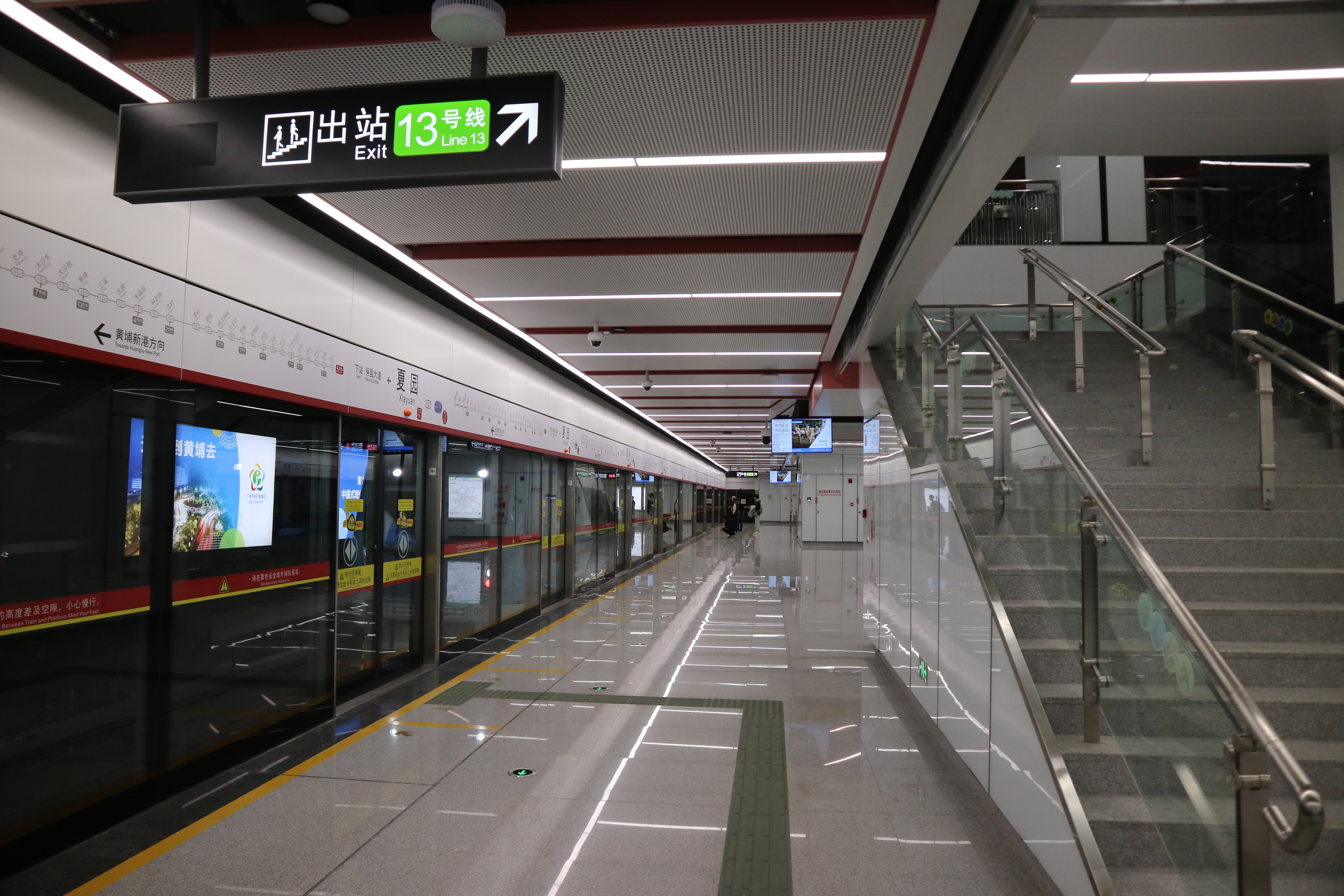
Line 5 platform

== History ==
The station first appeared in the 1997 metro plan, when it was a branch station of two branch lines of Line 3, and was named Xiayuan station, located west of the current location. In the 2003 plan, this station became an interchange station for Lines 5 and 14 at that time, and the location was moved east next to the overpass. Subsequently, in the 2008 plan, the original Line 14 was split and reorganized into multiple lines, and finally this station was determined to become an interchange station for Lines 5 and 13, and the station was moved west to its current location.

In 2013, the feasibility study report of the first phase of Line 13 was approved by the Provincial Development and Reform Commission. However, a hotel near the station was dissatisfied with the compensation standard and hindered the construction of the metro, thus slowing down the progress of the subway construction. After negotiation and settlement, the station officially started construction on 15 April 2015, marking the full start of construction of all stations in the first phase of Line 13. However, in the next month, 8 days after the beginning of construction, a coal gas pipeline near the station was excavated twice by metro construction, resulting in the subway station being suspended again. It was not until November of the same year that the pipeline relocation was completed that the station was able to resume work.

On 19 January 2017, the station's main structure successfully topped out. In the official name of the station of Line 13 declared by Guangzhou Metro Group to the Geographical Names Committee of the Guangzhou Civil Affairs Bureau, the name of the station remains unchanged.

On 29 September 2017, the site passed the project acceptance. On 28 December the same year, the station opened with the opening of Line 13, and the Line 13 station was assigned the station number "13-05", which was changed to "13-28" when the first section of the second phase of Line 13 opened.

The construction of the Line 5 station part began in 2018 with the eastern extension of Line 5, and the Line 5 station completed the "three rights" transfer on 31 October 2023. At 12:00 on 28 December 2023, the Line 5 station opened with the opening of the Line 5 eastern extension, and the station became a transfer station.

== Accident ==
During construction of the Line 13 station, the gas pipeline was damaged twice within 20 days. On 23 April 2015, while the station was undergoing sewage pipe relocation, it accidentally damaged the gas pipe laid underground, resulting in a large amount of gas leakage. On the morning of 13 May, during the construction of the envelope structure of this station, the gas pipeline was mistakenly dug up again. Fortunately, there were no casualties in either accident.

On 22 May 2020, due to the heavy rainstorm from the 2020 China floods in Guangzhou in the early morning, Line 13 was completely suspended, and the station was subsequently closed. It was reopened a week later on 29 May with the resumption of operation of the Yuzhu to Shacun section.
