= Miaotou station =

Guangzhou Metro Line 5 station

Miaotou 庙头
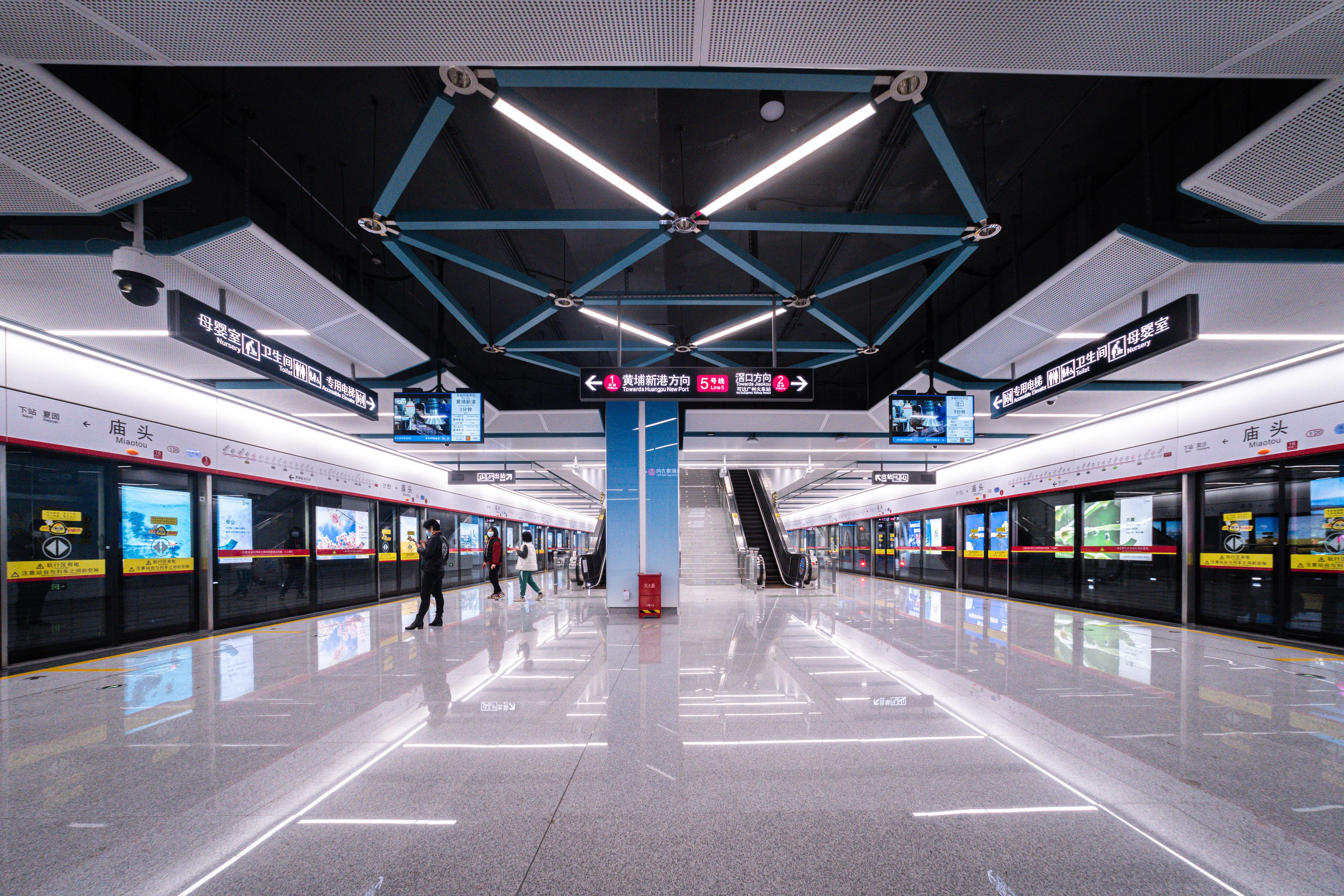
- Platform

Chinese name
- Simplified Chinese: 庙头站
- Traditional Chinese: 廟頭站
Transcriptions
Standard Mandarin
- Hanyu Pinyin: Miàotóu Zhàn
Yue: Cantonese
- Yale Romanization: Miuhtàuh Jaahm
- Jyutping: Miu^{6}tau^{4} Zaam^{6}

General information
- Location: Northeast side of the intersection of Huangpu East Road (黄埔东路) and Longtou Road (龙头路); Huangpu District, Guangzhou, Guangdong; China
- Coordinates: 23°5′15.76″N 113°29′49.31″E
- Operator: Guangzhou Metro Co. Ltd.
- Line: Line 5
- Platforms: 2 (1 island platform)
- Tracks: 2

Construction
- Structure type: Underground
- Accessible: Yes

Other information
- Station code: 526

History
- Opened: 28 December 2023 (2 years ago)
- Former names: Miaotou Lu (庙头路)

Services
Preceding station	Guangzhou Metro	Following station
Shuangsha towards Jiaokou	Line 5	Xiayuan towards Huangpu New Port
Location

Miaotou station (simplified Chinese: 庙头站; traditional Chinese: 廟頭站; pinyin: Miàotóu zhàn; Cantonese Yale: Miuhtàuh Jaahm) is a metro station on Line 5 of the Guangzhou Metro in Guangzhou, China. It is located underground at the northeast side of the intersection of Huangpu East Road (黄埔东路) and Longtou Road (龙头路) in Huangpu District. It opened on 28 December 2023, with the opening of the eastern extension of the line.

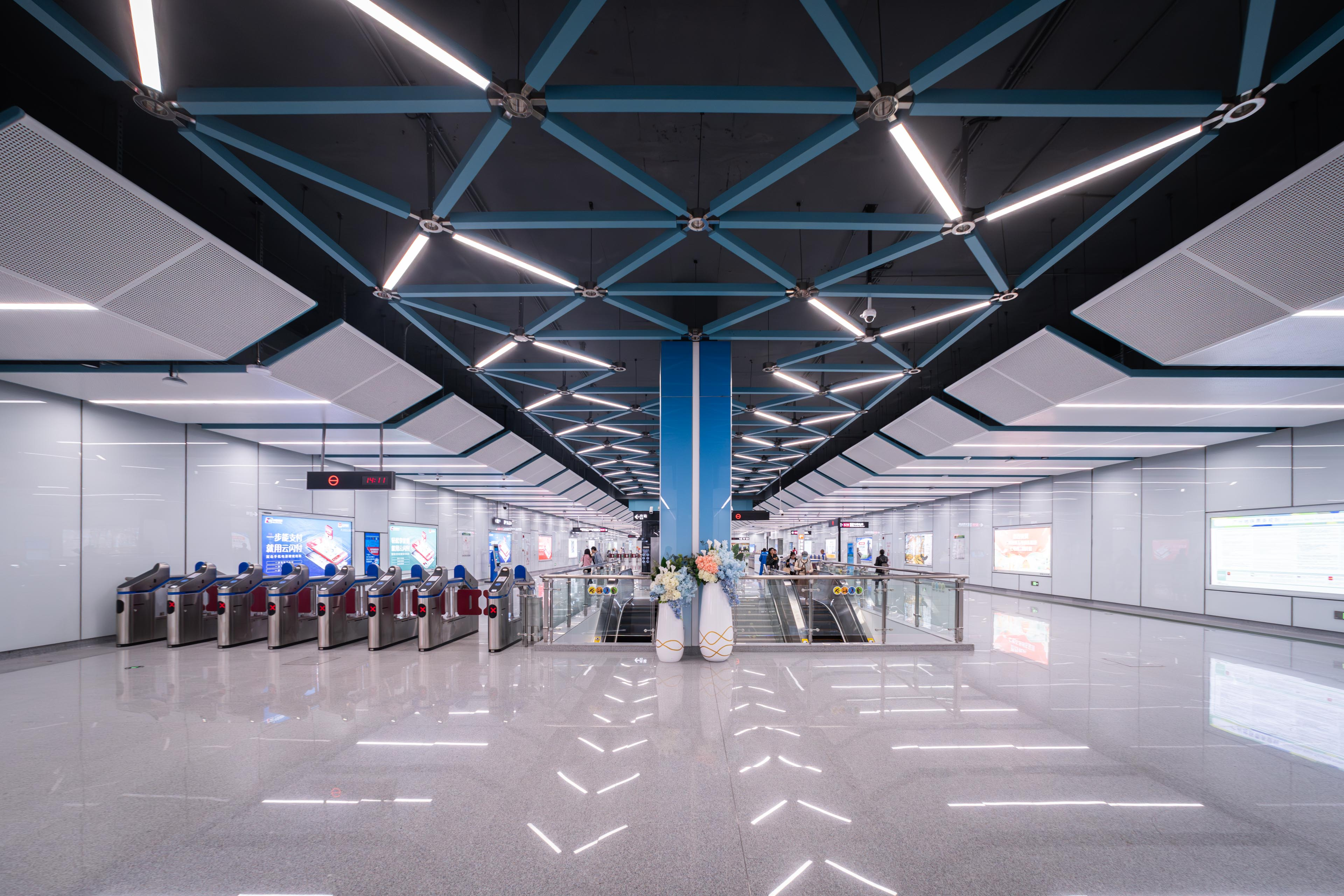
Concourse

== Station layout ==
G	Street level	Exits A, B1, B2, C
L1; Concourse	Lobby	Ticket Machines, Customer Service, Shops, Police Station, Safety Facilities
L2; Platforms	Platform 2	5 towards Jiaokou (Shuangsha)
L2; Platforms	Island platform, doors will open on the left (Toilets, Nursery)
L2; Platforms	Platform 1	5 towards Huangpu New Port (Xiayuan)

=== Entrances/exits ===
The station has 4 points of entry/exit. Exit C is equipped with an elevator.

- A: Huangpu East Road
- B1: Huangpu East Road, BRT Miaotou Station
- B2: Huangpu East Road
- C: Longtou Road
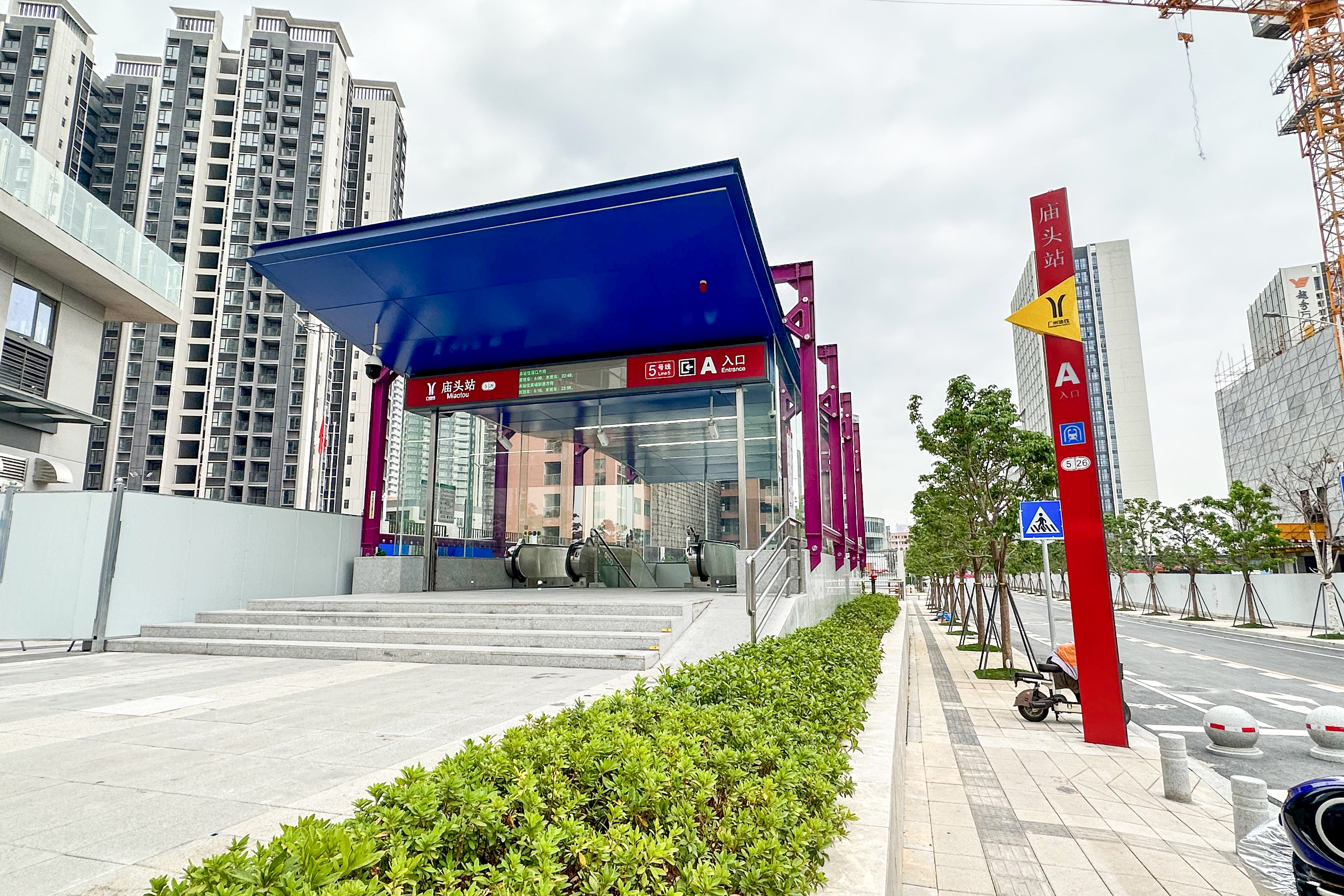
Entrance A

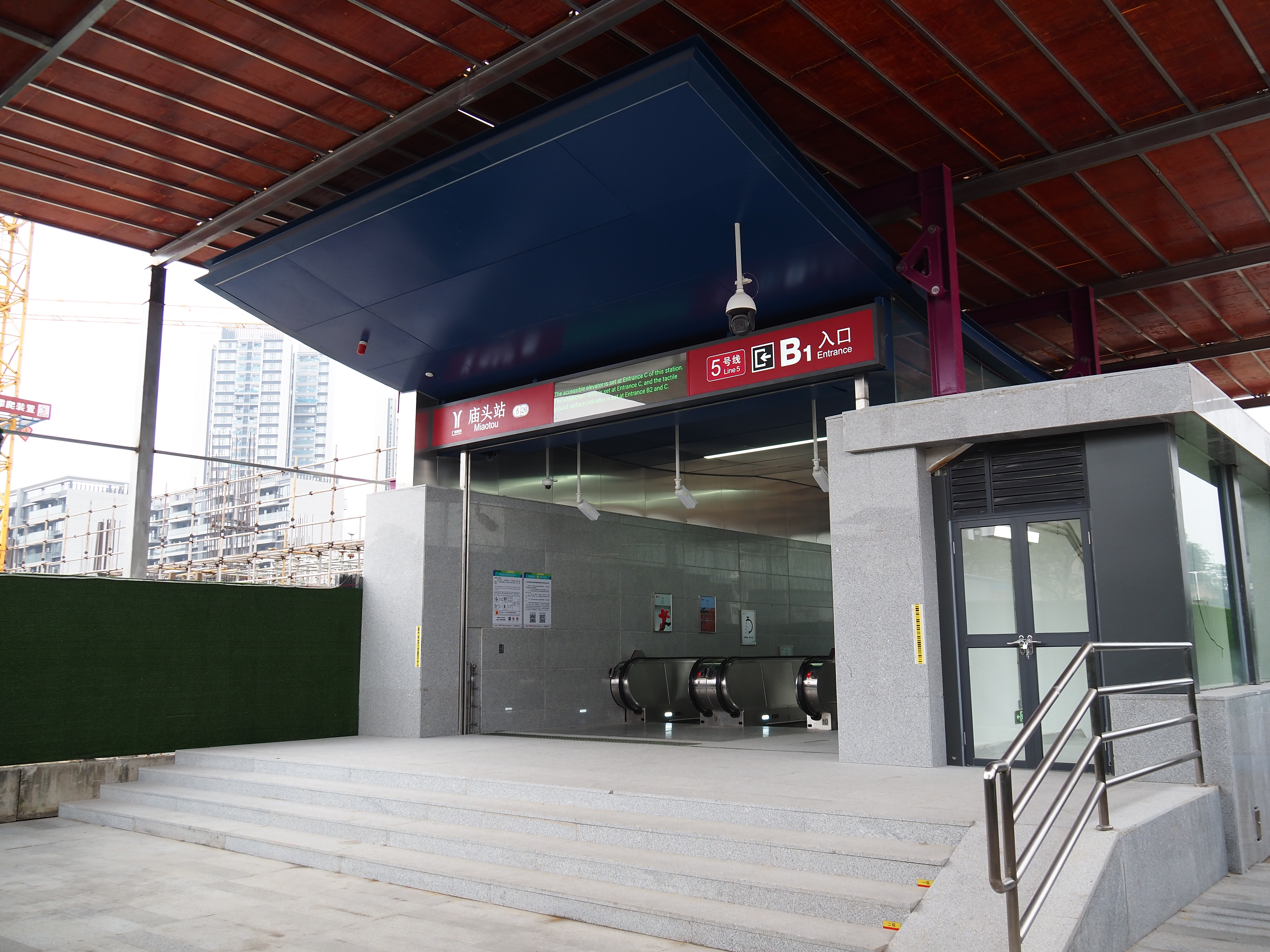
Entrance B1

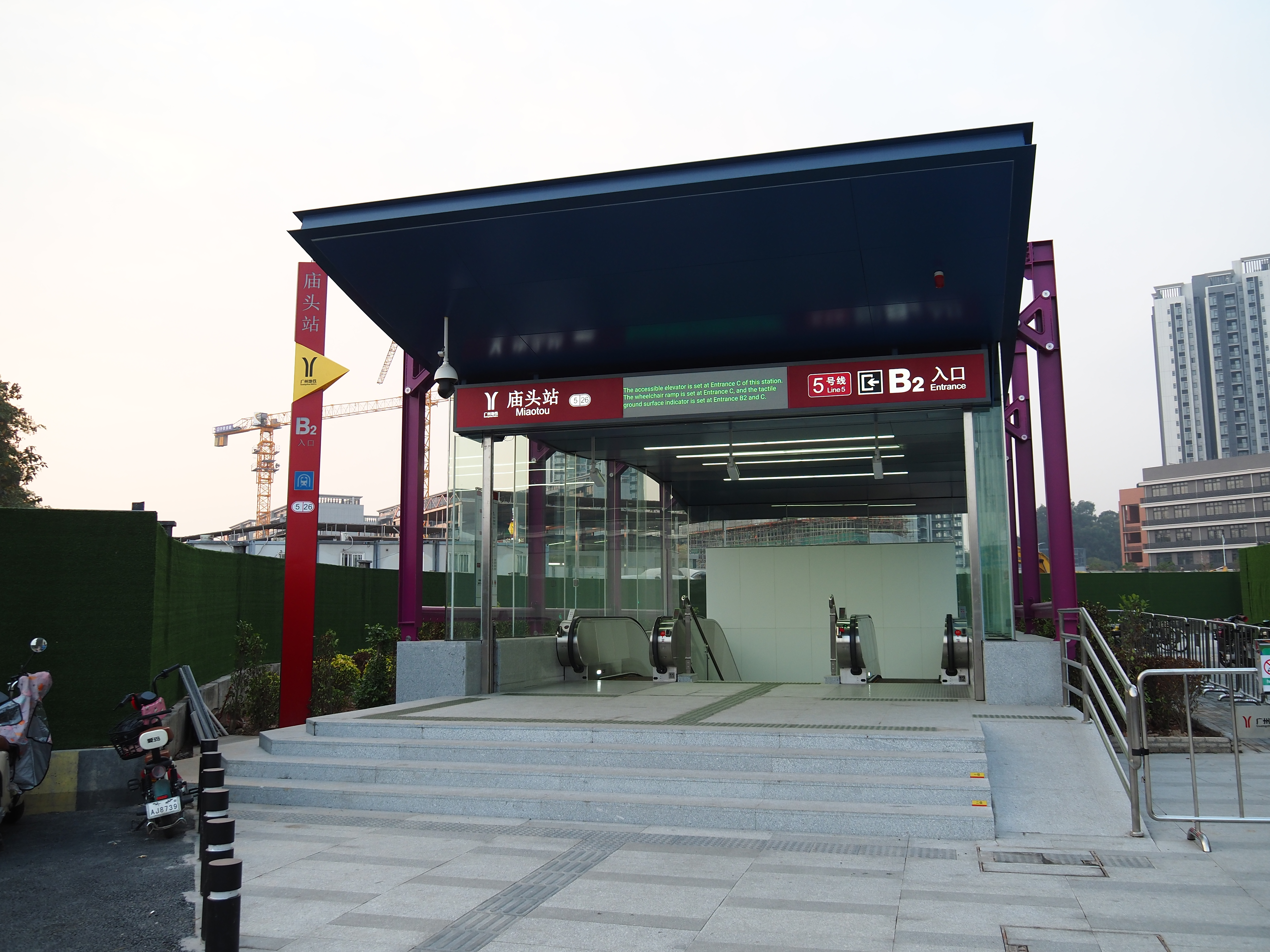
Entrance B2

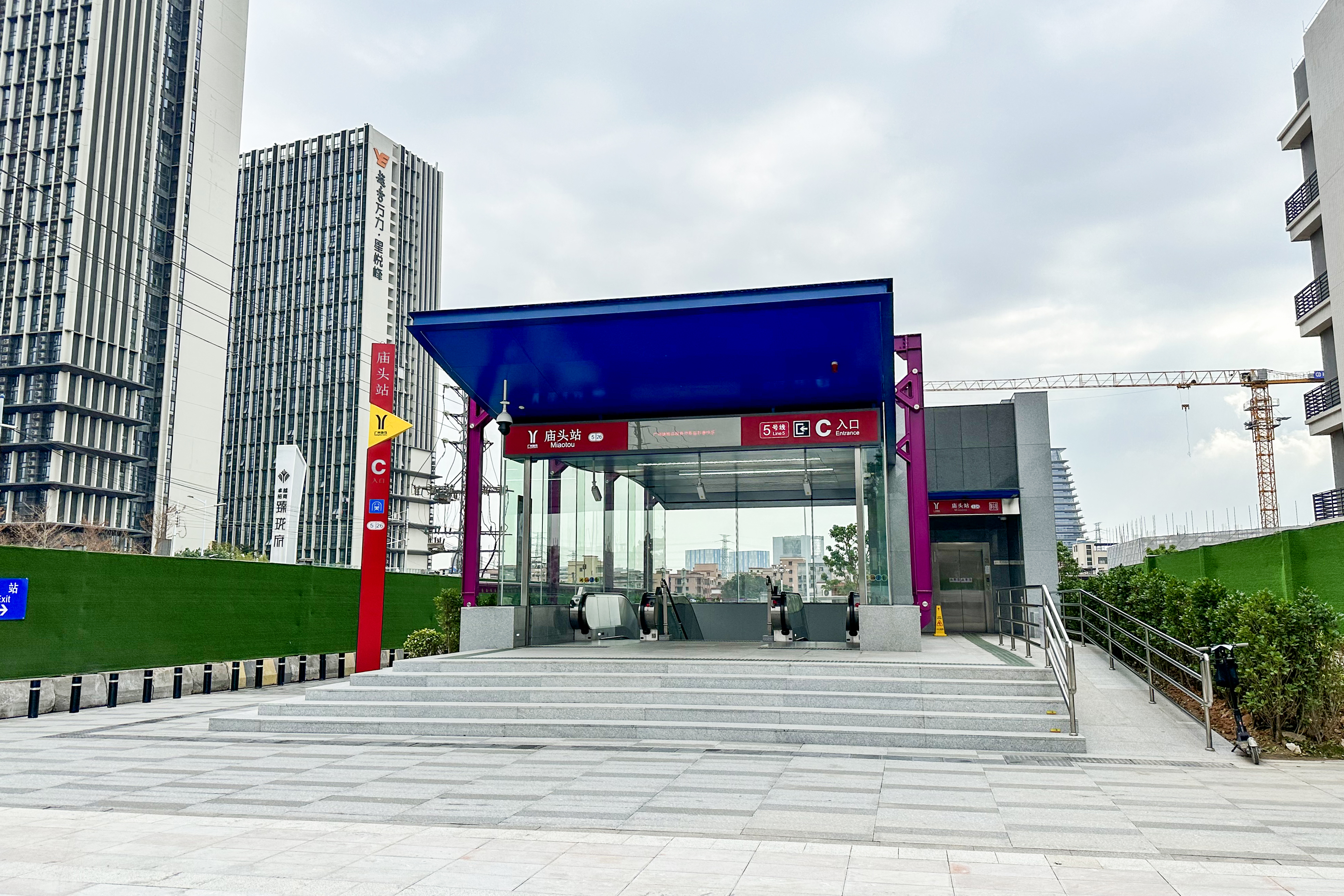
Entrance C

== History ==
The station was the last one to be capped on the eastern extension of Line 5, which happened during January 2023.

During the planning phase, this station was called Miaotou Lu station. On 27 February 2023, the Guangzhou Civil Affairs Bureau announced the initial names of stations on the east extension of Line 5, and this station was renamed to Miaotou station. The station completed the "three rights" transfer on 31 October 2023. The station opened on 28 December 2023.
