= Nanhai God Temple station =

Guangzhou Metro station

Coordinates: 23°05′01″N 113°29′51″E

Nanhai God Temple 南海神庙
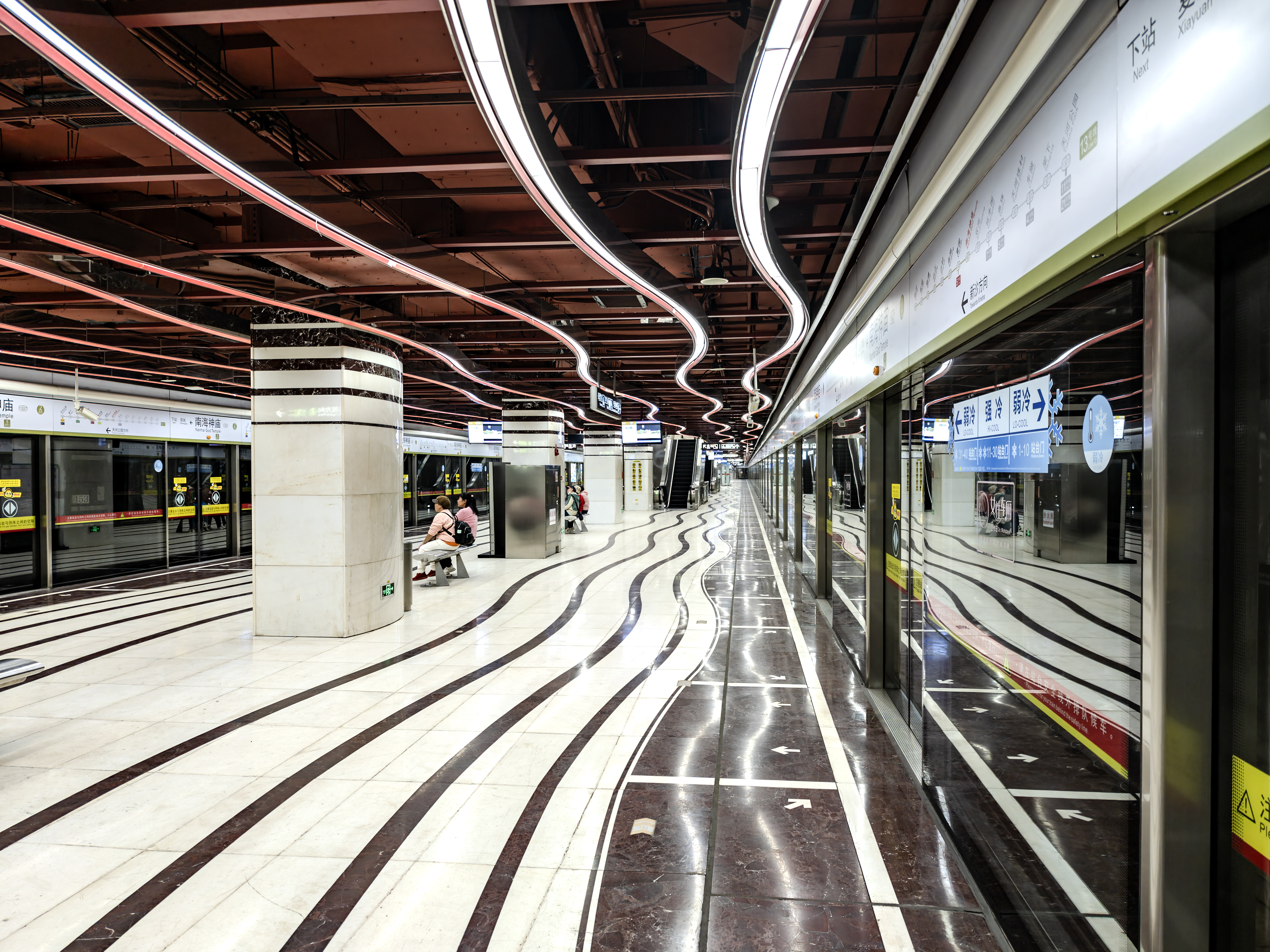

Chinese name
- Simplified Chinese: 南海神庙站
- Traditional Chinese: 南海神廟站
Transcriptions
Standard Mandarin
- Hanyu Pinyin: Nánhǎi shénmiào Zhàn
Yue: Cantonese
- Jyutping: naam^{4}hoi^{2} san^{4}miu^{6} zaam^{6}

General information
- Location: East Huangpu Road (G107) and West Dianchang Road (电厂西路); Huangpu District, Guangzhou, Guangdong; China
- Operator: Guangzhou Metro Co. Ltd.
- Line: Line 13

Construction
- Structure type: Underground

Other information
- Station code: 1327

History
- Opened: 28 December 2017; 8 years ago

Services
Preceding station	Guangzhou Metro	Following station
Shuanggang towards Tianhe Park	Line 13	Xiayuan towards Xinsha
Location

Nanhai God Temple station (Chinese: 南海神庙站) is a station of Line 13 of the Guangzhou Metro. It started operations on 28 December 2017.

== Station layout ==
G	-	Exits
L1; Concourse	Lobby	Customer Service, Shops, Vending machines, ATMs
L2; Platforms	Platform 2	13 towards Tianhe Park (Shuanggang)
L2; Platforms	Island platform, doors will open on the left
L2; Platforms	Platform 1	13 towards Xinsha (Xiayuan)

== Exits ==
Exit number		Exit location
Exit C	C2	Huangpu Donglu
Exit D		Huangpu Donglu
