= Guangzhou Bus Rapid Transit =

Bus rapid transit system of the city of Guangzhou, China

Guangzhou Bus Rapid Transit (GBRT)

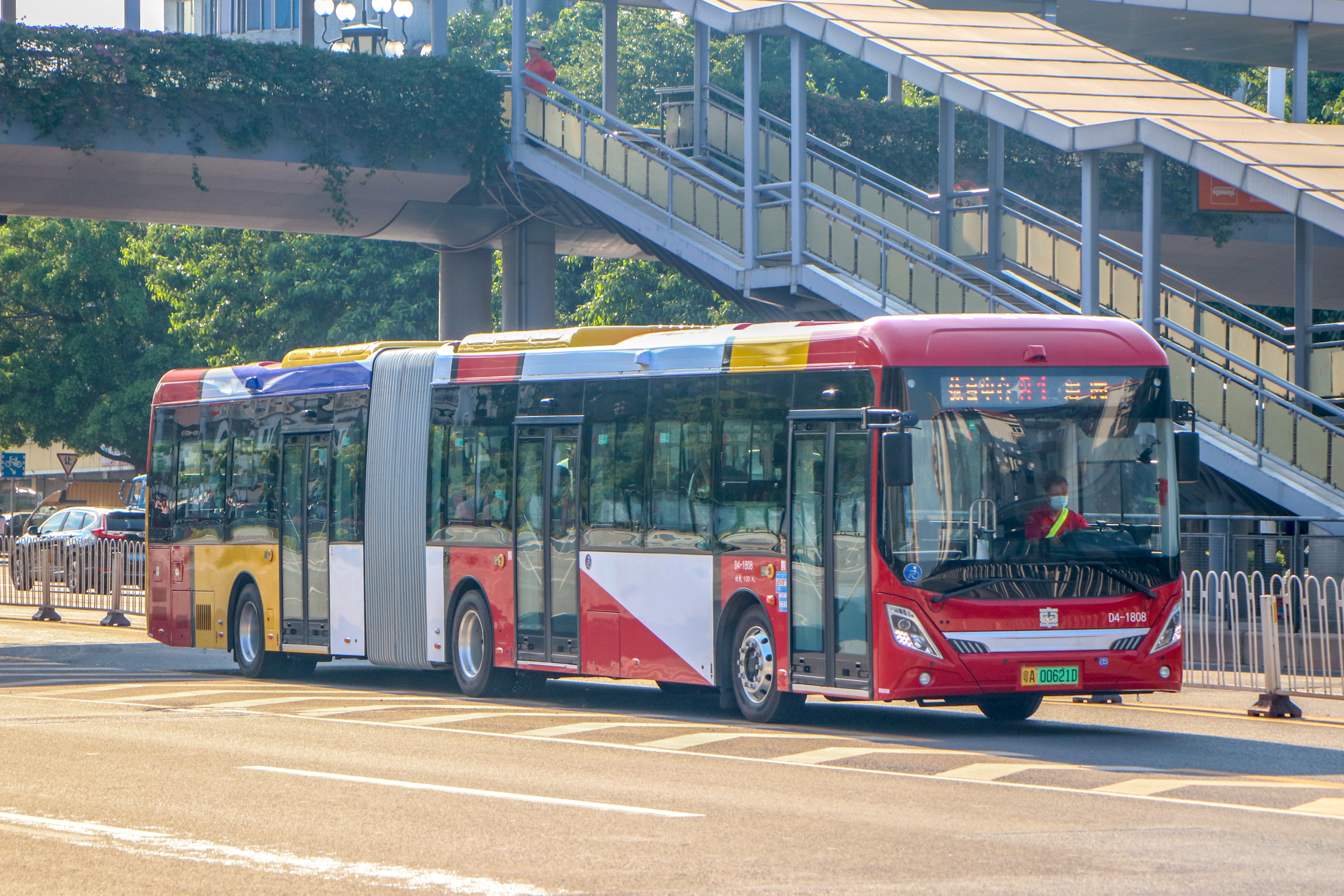
- CRRC TEG6180BEV02 articulated bus on route B1

Overview
- Locale: Guangzhou
- Transit type: Bus rapid transit
- Number of lines: 31
- Number of stations: 27
- Daily ridership: 1,000,000
- Website: http://www.gz-brt.cn/

Operation
- Began operation: 10 February 2010

Technical
- System length: 22.5 km (14.0 mi)
- Top speed: 21 km/h (13 mph)

Guangzhou Bus Rapid Transit
- Simplified Chinese: 广州快速公交
- Traditional Chinese: 廣州快速公交
Transcriptions
Standard Mandarin
- Hanyu Pinyin: Guǎngzhōu Kuàisù Gōngjiāo

Alternative Chinese name
- Simplified Chinese: 广州 BRT
- Traditional Chinese: 廣州 BRT
Transcriptions
Standard Mandarin
- Hanyu Pinyin: Guǎngzhōu BRT

Guangzhou Bus Rapid Transit (Guangzhou BRT or GBRT) is the bus rapid transit (BRT) system of the city of Guangzhou in the People's Republic of China. Its first line was put into operation on 10 February 2010. It handles approximately 1,000,000 passenger trips daily with a peak passenger flow of 26,900 pphpd (second only to the TransMilenio BRT system in Bogotá, Colombia). In fact, this rapid transit system contains the world's longest BRT stations – around 260m including bridges – with bus volumes of 1 bus every 10 seconds or 350 per hour in a single direction. The BRT system has two new lines and two extensions planned.

== Fleet ==
The BRT operates the following models of buses:

- King Long XMQ6127G2
- King Long XMQ6180G2
- Youngman JNP6182LPG
- Yutong ZK6120HGV
- Yutong ZK6180HLGAA

The livery of the BRT is orange with BRT written in white on the sides.

== Zhongshan Avenue Bus Rapid Transit trial line ==
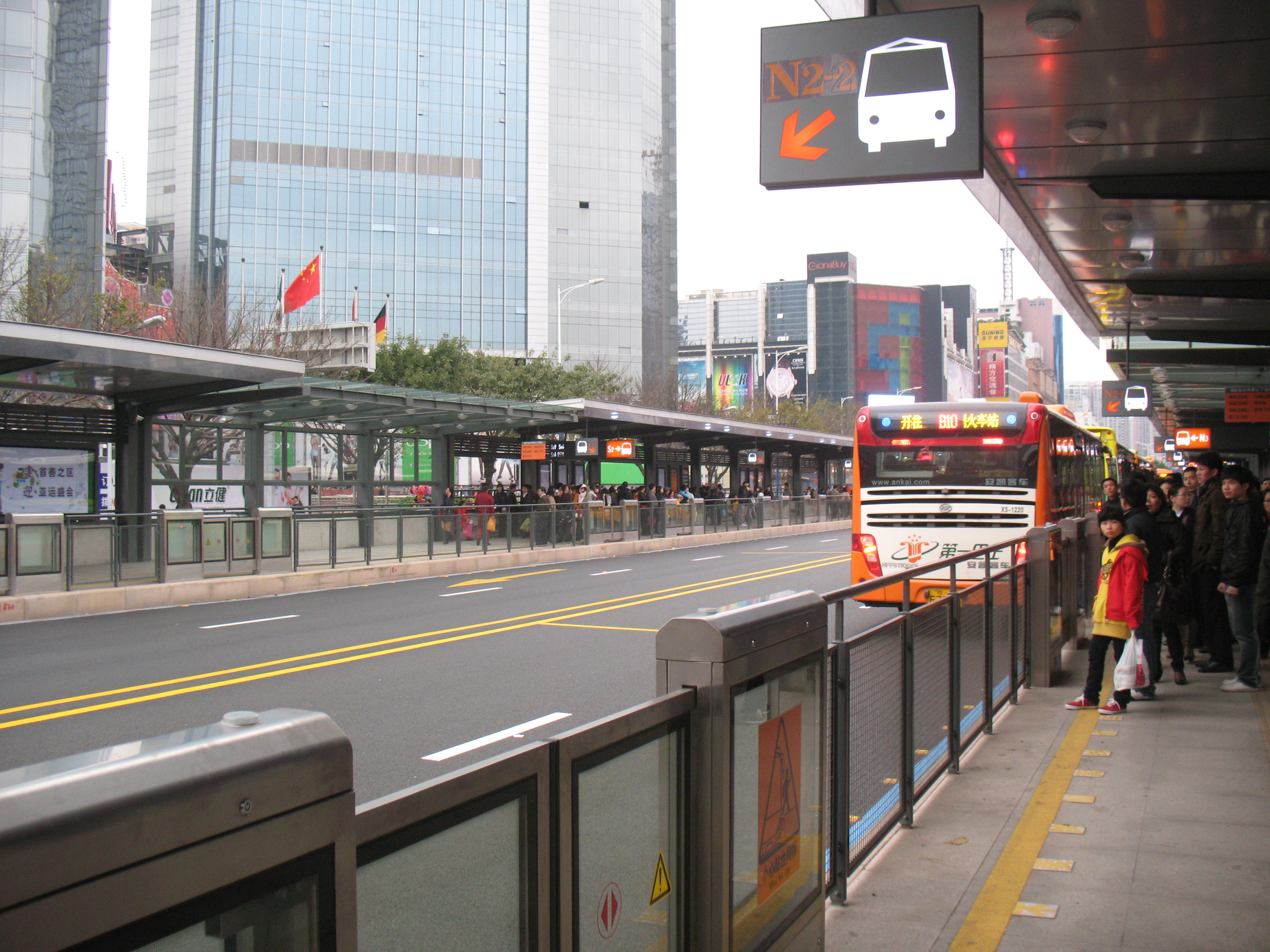
Tianhe Sports Center Station

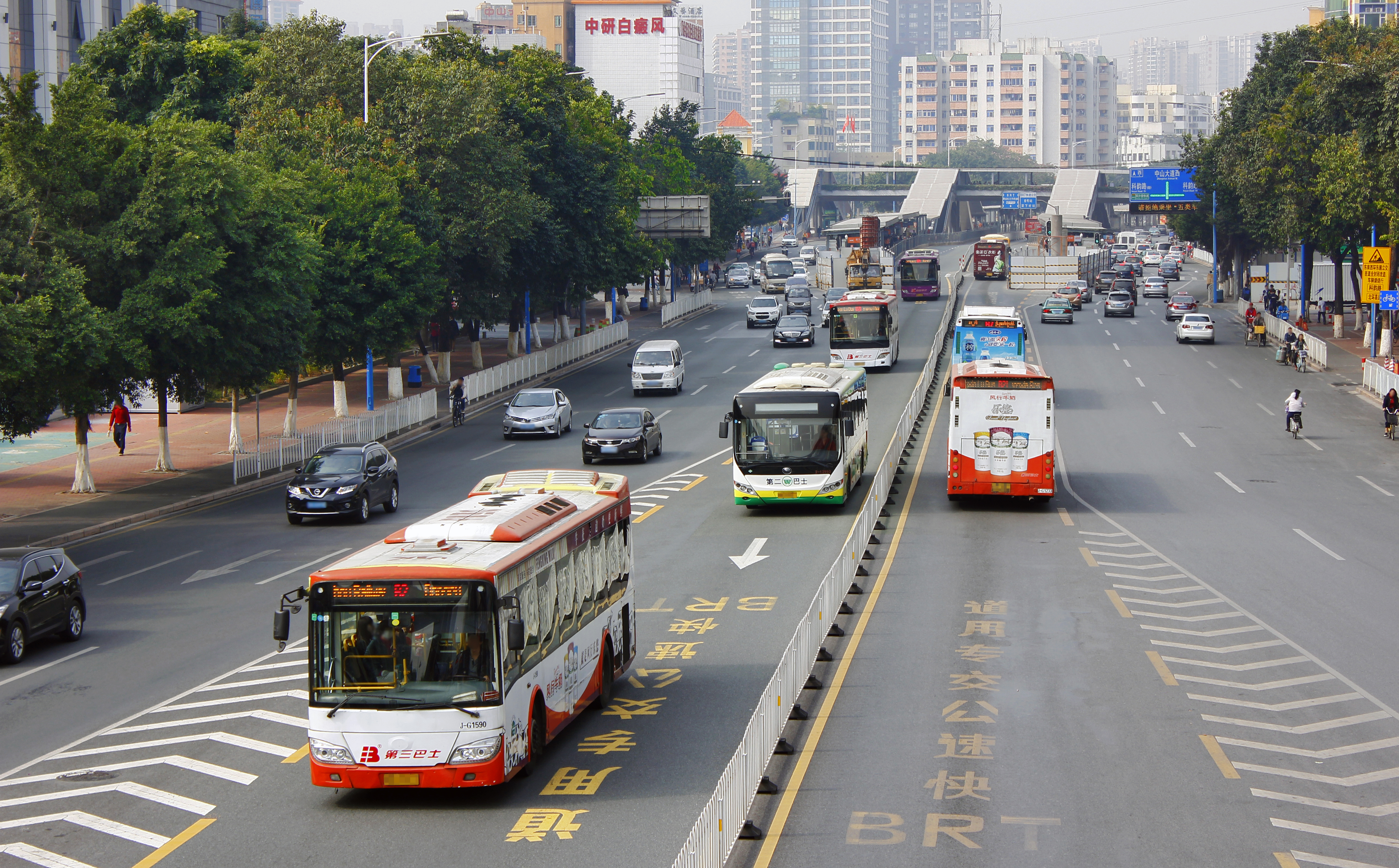
GBRT dedicated corridor

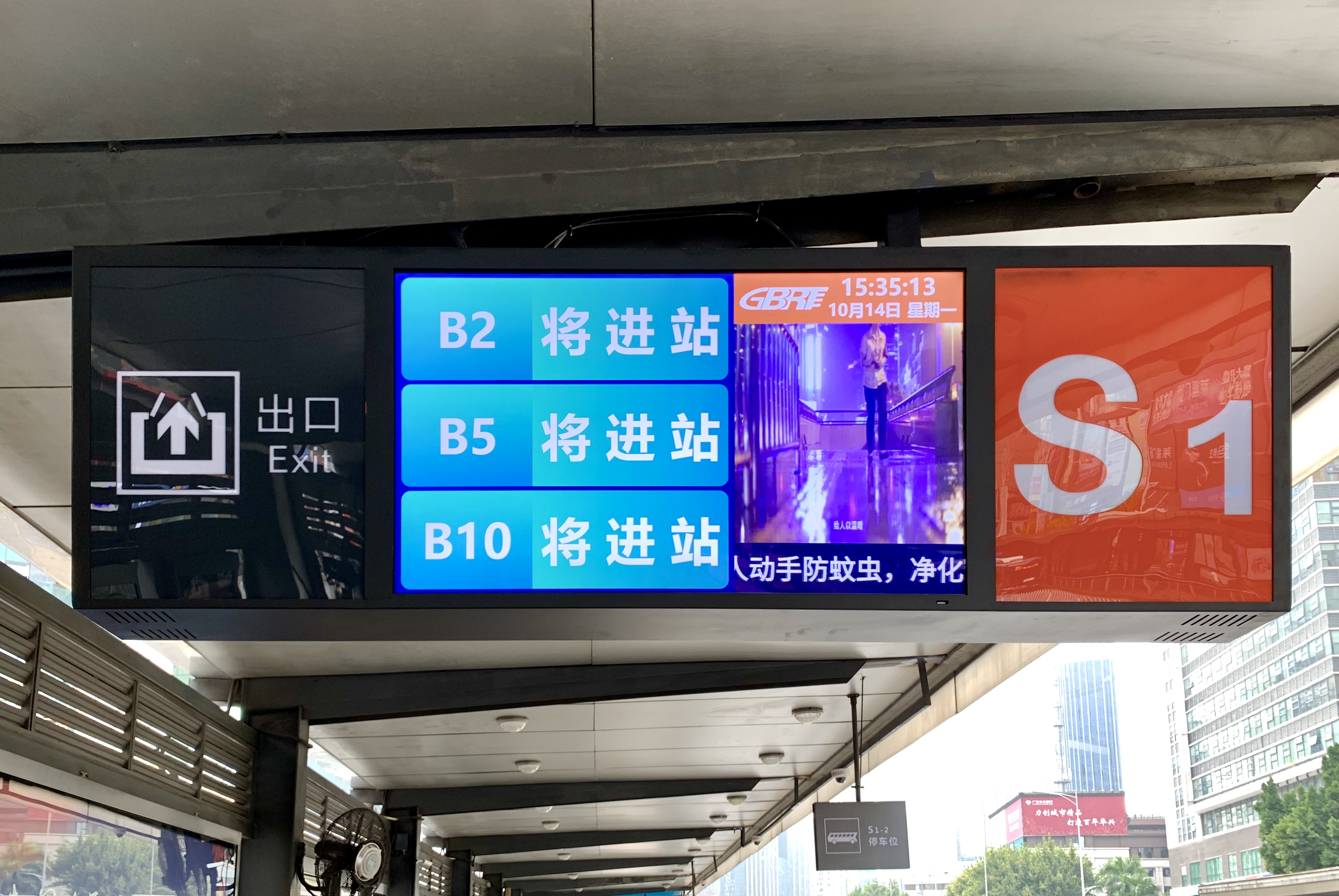
LCD Passenger Information Screen at Gangding Station.

Zhongshan Avenue Bus Rapid Transit Trial Line (Chinese: 中山大道快速公交试验线) is the first and only line in operation of Guangzhou BRT. The line is laid out along Zhongshan Avenue (中山大道), whose innermost lanes form a dedicated BRT corridor. It starts at Tianhe Sports Center in Tianhe District in the west and ends at Lumingshan Bus Terminal in Huangpu District in the east with 27 stations. Several stations have connections to Guangzhou Metro. Same-direction transfers between buses within the BRT corridor are free. The project won numerous awards such as the Sustainable Transportation Development Award in 2011, the first Chinese transportation project to win such award.

Station Name English	Station Name Chinese	Transfer	Location
Tianhe Sports Center	体育中心	1 3 APM | 10	Tianhe
Shipaiqiao	石牌桥	3	Tianhe
Gangding	岗顶	3	Tianhe
South China Normal University & Jinan University	师大暨大		Tianhe
Huajing Xincheng	华景新城	11	Tianhe
Shangshe	上社		Tianhe
Xueyuan	学院		Tianhe
Tangxiacun	棠下村	13	Tianhe
Tangdong	棠东		Tianhe
Tianlangmingju	天朗明居		Tianhe
Chebei	车陂	4 13	Tianhe
Dongpuzhen	东圃镇		Tianhe
Huangcun	黄村	Dongpu Coach Terminal	Tianhe
Zhucun	珠村	13	Tianhe
Lianxi	莲溪		Tianhe
Maogang	茅岗		Huangpu
Zhujiang Village	珠江村		Huangpu
Xiasha	下沙		Huangpu
Wuchong	乌冲		Huangpu
Wenyuan (Shuanggang Metro Station)	文园（地铁双岗站）	13 Huangpu Coach Station	Huangpu
Shuanggang	双岗		Huangpu
Shapu	沙浦		Huangpu
South Sea God Temple	南海神庙	13	Huangpu
Miaotou	庙头	5	Huangpu
Nanwan	南湾		Huangpu
Xiayuan	夏园	5 13	Huangpu
Lumingshan Bus Terminal	鹿鸣山总站		Huangpu

== Accidents and incidents ==
On 1 July 2014, at Tianhe Sports Center, a B5 bus travelling eastbound clipped another B5 bus travelling in the same direction, before crossing the centre median and colliding head-on with a westbound B3 bus. In total, 17 passengers were hospitalized, including 3 in a serious condition.

On 1 January 2018, while a passenger was alighting from a B3 bus at Shipaiqiao station, both the bus and platform screen doors closed, resulting in the passenger being dragged along the roadway as the bus moved off. Other passengers immediately signalled the driver to stop. The bus company took full responsibility for the incident and paid for the injured passenger's medical fees.

On 3 March 2021, a sinkhole opened up on Zhongshan Avenue, near Zhucun station, blocking all eastbound lanes including the BRT lane. Eastbound buses were diverted onto local streets, missing 3 BRT stations (Zhucun - Maogang). Services returned to normal the next morning.

On 12 November 2024, a tipper truck collided with the footbridge at Tianlangmingju station. For safety reasons, the footbridge was closed and buses temporarily skipped the station.
