= Shuanggang station (Guangzhou Metro) =

Guangzhou Metro station

Coordinates: 23°05′38.76″N 113°28′32.01″E

Shuanggang 双岗
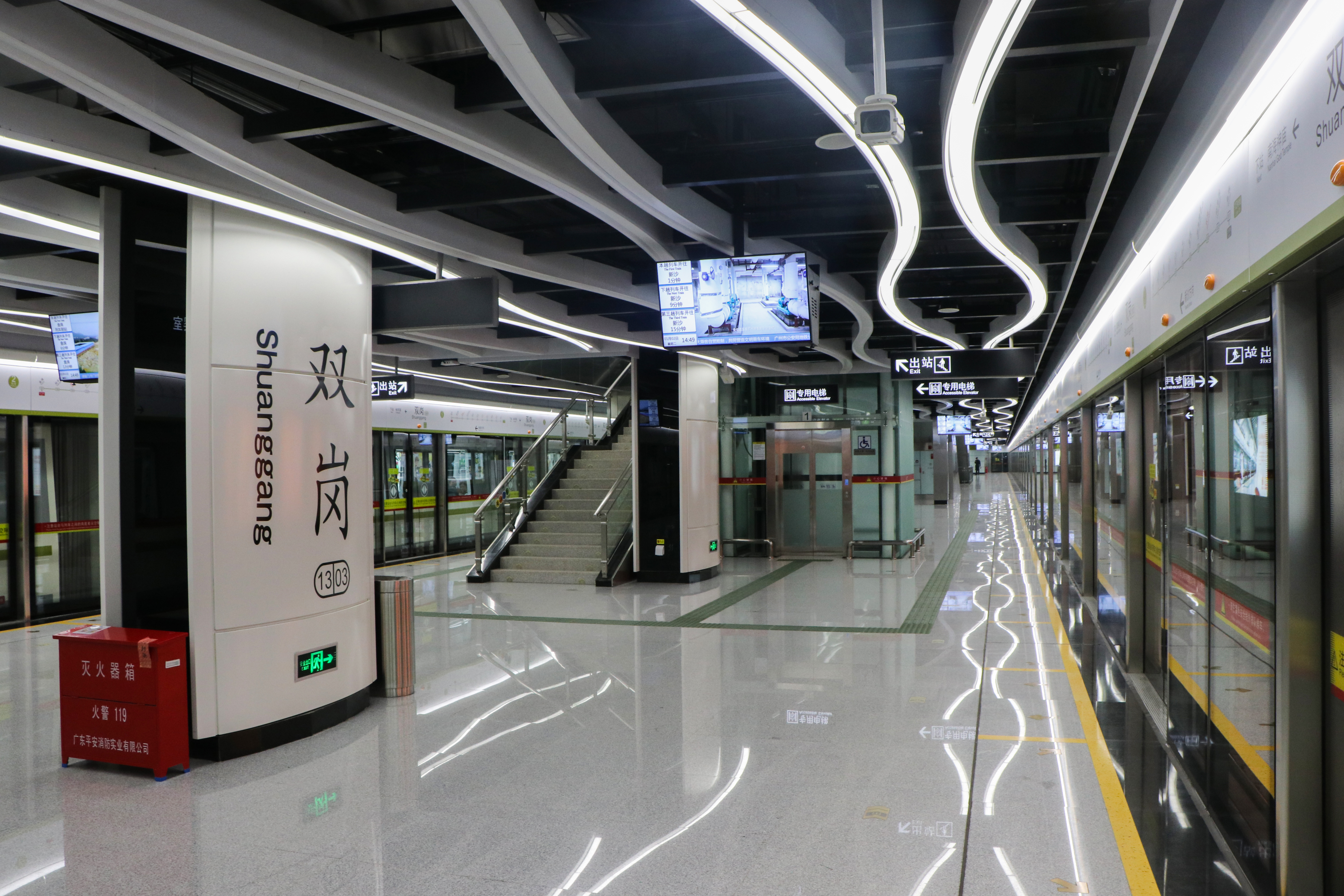

Chinese name
- Simplified Chinese: 双岗站
- Traditional Chinese: 雙崗站
Transcriptions
Standard Mandarin
- Hanyu Pinyin: Shuānggǎng Zhàn
Yue: Cantonese
- Jyutping: soeng^{1}gong^{1} zaam^{6}

General information
- Location: East Huangpu Road (G107); Huangpu District, Guangzhou, Guangdong; China
- Operator: Guangzhou Metro Co. Ltd.
- Line: Line 13
- Platforms: 4

Other information
- Station code: 1326

History
- Opened: 28 December 2017; 8 years ago

Services
Preceding station	Guangzhou Metro	Following station
Yufengwei towards Tianhe Park	Line 13	Nanhai God Temple towards Xinsha
Location

Shuanggang Station (Chinese: 双岗站) formerly Wenyuan Station (文园站) during planning, is a station of Line 13 of the Guangzhou Metro in Huangpu District.

== Station layout ==
G	-	Exits
L1; Concourse	Lobby	Customer Service, Shops, Vending machines, ATMs
L2; Platforms	Platform 2	13 towards Tianhe Park (Yufengwei)
L2; Platforms	Island platform, doors will open on the left
L2; Platforms	Platform 1	13 towards Xinsha (Nanhai God Temple)

== Exits ==
Exit number	Exit location
Exit A	Huangpu Donglu
Exit B	Wenchuan Lu
