= Line 13 (Guangzhou Metro) =

Line of the Guangzhou Metro

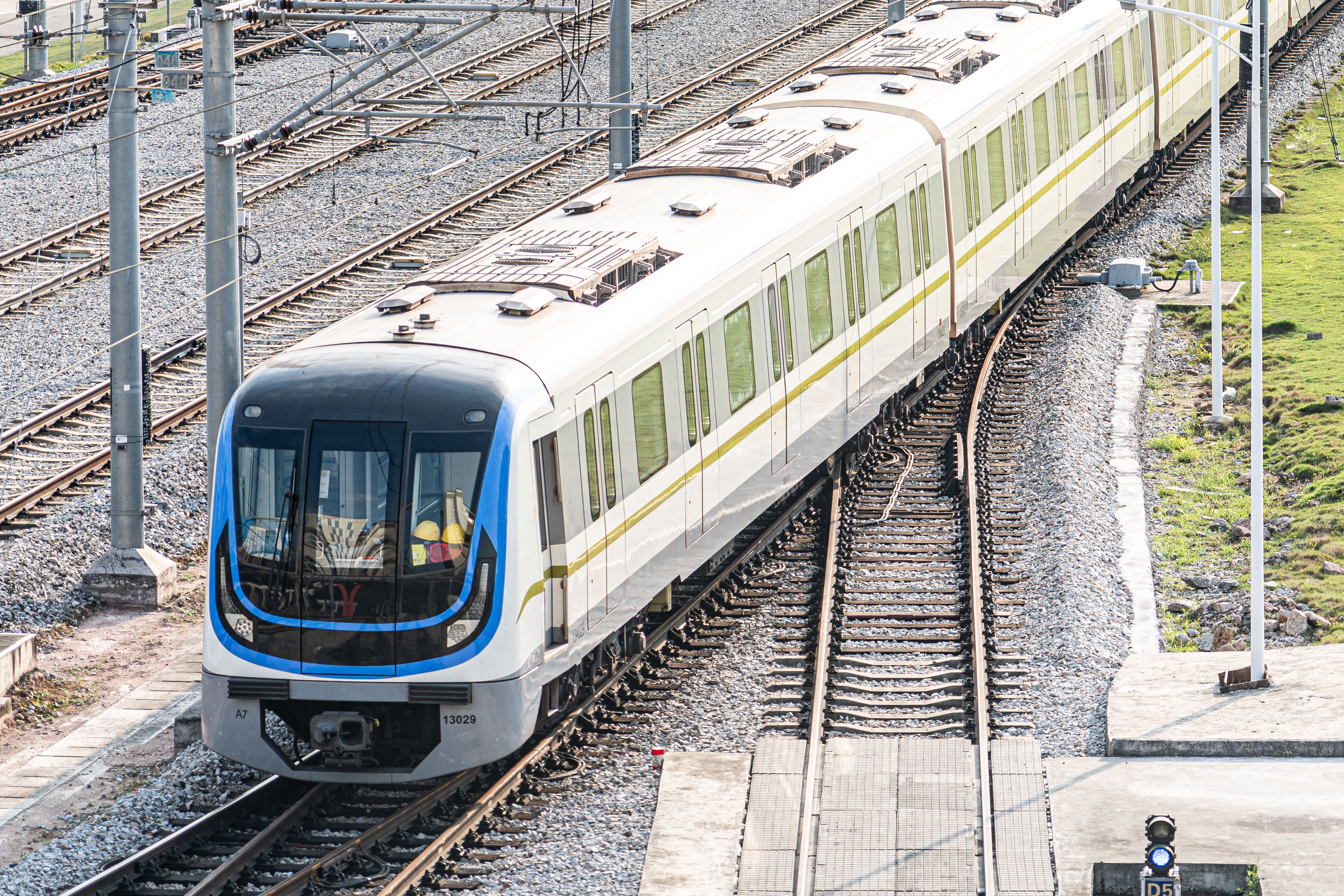
- A train of Guangzhou Metro Line 13

Overview
- Other name(s): M9 (2000 plan name); M13 (2013 plan name); East–West express line (东西快线)
- Status: Phase 1 and Phase 2 East Section operational, Phase 2 West Section under construction
- Owner: City of Guangzhou
- Locale: Zengcheng, Huangpu and Tianhe districts Guangzhou, Guangdong
- Termini: Tianhe Park; Xinsha
- Stations: 15

Service
- Type: Rapid transit
- System: Guangzhou Metro
- Services: 1
- Operator: Guangzhou Metro Corporation
- Daily ridership: 146,000 (2025 daily average)

History
- Opened: 28 December 2017; 8 years ago

Technical
- Line length: 36.9 km (22.9 mi)
- Track gauge: 1,435 mm (4 ft 8 1/2 in)
- Operating speed: 100 km/h (62 mph)

Line 13
- Simplified Chinese: 广州地铁13号线
- Traditional Chinese: 廣州地鐵13號線
Transcriptions
Standard Mandarin
- Hanyu Pinyin: Guǎngzhōu Dìtiě Shísān Hào Xiàn
Yue: Cantonese
- Jyutping: gwong^{2}zau^{1} dei^{6}tit^{3} sap^{6}saam^{1} hou^{6} sin^{3}

Line 13 of the Guangzhou Metro is a rapid transit rail line in Guangzhou, China. When complete, it will form the "east-west express line" complementing Line 3 which is the "north-south express line". The line will serve some of the most popular areas in Guangzhou such as Luochongwei Bus Terminal, Zhujiang New Town CBD and Yuancun while passing through some of the densest and most populated areas of Tianhe, Yuexiu, and Liwan Districts. The first section of the line opened on 28 December 2017.

== History ==
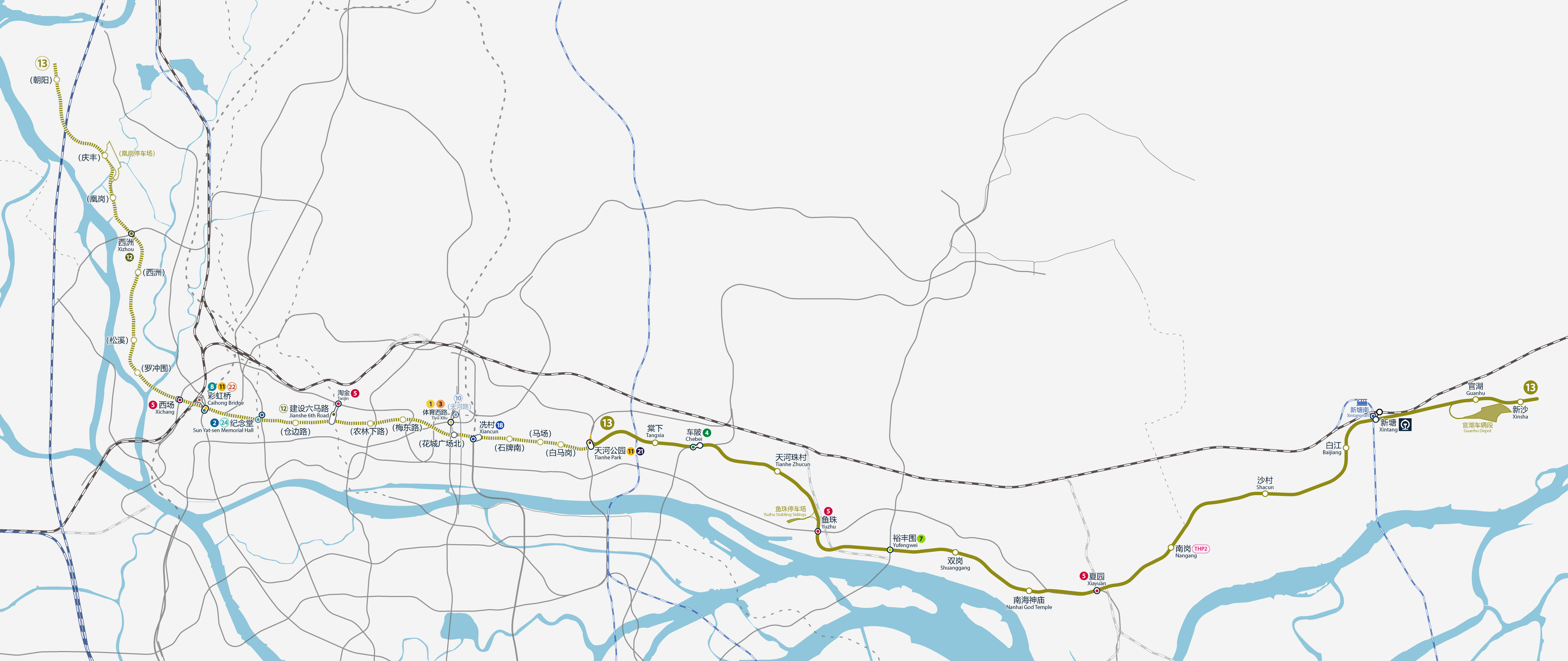
Line 13 drawn to scale.

Segment	Commencement	Length	Station(s)	Name
Yuzhu — Xinsha	28 December 2017	25.61 km (15.91 mi)	11	Phase 1
Tianhe Park – Yuzhu	29 September 2025	8.6 km (5.34 mi)	4	Phase 2 East Section

=== Planning ===
A line resembling Line 13 first appeared in long-term planning for Guangzhou Metro in 2003, running from west to east across the city between Chatou (near Huanggang in the current plan) and Xintang. It remained in long-term plans in 2007, now renamed Line 14, with construction planned to start after 2010.

By 2009, it had been renamed again to Line 13 and the route was firming, having been extended east to Xiangjingling (present day Xinsha). The line would be constructed in sections, with the initial opening from Yuzhu to Xiangjingling. At the same time, plans formed for a branch off line 13 at Shapu (near present day Nanhai God Temple station) running to Huangpu Passenger Port.

In 2012, it was considered to split Line 13 into two lines, with the western section terminating at Tangxia and the east section at Tianhe Park, and a cross-platform interchange at both stations. This was proposed to increase capacity of the eastern section, with eastbound passenger demand expected to reach 55,000 pphpd in the morning peak.

Ultimately this split did not proceed, with Phase 1 of the line receiving approval from the Guangdong Development and Reform Commission on 16 December 2013. It would consist of 11 stations between Yuzhu and Xiangjingling, with a depot south of Guanhu. The total budget for this phase was ¥19.026b.

In 2016, an "initial extension" of Line 13 west to Tianhe Park was proposed ahead of a full Phase 2, in order to reduce expected pressure on Line 5 following opening of Phase 1.

Ultimately, this extension was folded into Phase 2 and was approved on 15 October 2017 by the Guangzhou Development and Reform Commission. This would bring the line east through the city centre to Chaoyang. Initial ridership upon the opening of both phases is expected to reach 1.2 million passengers per day.

=== Construction ===
==== Phase 1 ====
The first tunnel section of Line 13 was completed on 4 August 2016.

The first station structure to be completed was Dongzhou (final name Baijiang) on 15 April 2015. The last was Nangang on 28 February 2017.

Phase 1 opened for passenger service on 28 December 2017.

==== Phase 2 ====
Tianhe Park station started construction on 26 December 2017, marking the start of construction for Phase 2. Both tunnels between here and Baimagang were completed in June 2020, making it the first tunnel section of Phase 2 to be completed. On 30 December 2020, the main structure of Qingfeng station was completed, the first on Phase 2. All tunnelling had been completed by September 2024.

By August 2025, a section of Phase 2 (Tianhe Park - Yuzhu) had begun trial operation. Trains were running the full length between Tianhe Park and Xinsha, but only taking passengers on the Phase 1 section east of Yuzhu. This section opened for passengers on 29 September 2025.

== Stations ==
Legend

- Stations under construction

Station No.	Station name		Connections	Future Connections	Distance km		Location
Station No.	English	Chinese	Connections	Future Connections	Distance km		Location
1301	Yagang	鸦岗					Baiyun
1302	Qingfeng	庆丰					Baiyun
1303	Huanggang	凰岗					Baiyun
1304	Xizhou	西洲	12 1203				Baiyun
1305	Chalong	槎龙					Baiyun
1306	Songzhou	松洲					Baiyun
1307	Luochongwei	罗冲围					Baiyun
1308	Xichang	西场	5 504				Liwan
1309	Caihong Bridge	彩虹桥	8 811 11 1116	22			Liwan
1310	Sun Yat-sen Memorial Hall	纪念堂	2 214	24			Yuexiu
1311	Cangbian Road	仓边路					Yuexiu
1312	Jianshe 6th Road	建设六马路	Taojin: 5 508	12 1214			Yuexiu
1313	Zhixin	执信					Yuexiu
1314	Meidong Road	梅东路					Yuexiu
1315	Huacheng Square North	花城广场北	OSI: APM (via Huangpu Dadao APM06)				Tianhe
1316	Xiancun	冼村	18 1808				Tianhe
1317	Shipai South	石牌南					Tianhe
1318	Jinan University	暨大					Tianhe
1319	Yuancun Shanding	员村山顶					Tianhe
1320	Tianhe Park	天河公园	11 1104 21 2102				Tianhe
1321	Tangxia	棠下					Tianhe
1322	Chebei	车陂	4 423				Tianhe
1323	Tianhe Zhucun	天河珠村					Tianhe
1324	Yuzhu	鱼珠	5 521		0.00	0.00	Huangpu
1325	Yufengwei	裕丰围	7 713		2.64	2.64	Huangpu
1326	Shuanggang	双岗	GBRT		2.23	4.87	Huangpu
1327	Nanhai God Temple	南海神庙	GBRT		2.61	7.48	Huangpu
1328	Xiayuan	夏园	5 527; GBRT		2.18	9.66	Huangpu
1329	Nangang	南岗			2.88	12.54	Huangpu
1330	Shacun	沙村			3.63	16.17	Zengcheng
1331	Baijiang	白江			3.27	19.44	Zengcheng
1332	Xintang	新塘	NUQ SS		1.44	20.88	Zengcheng
1333	Guanhu	官湖			3.41	24.29	Zengcheng
1334	Xinsha	新沙			1.32	25.61	Zengcheng

== Rolling stock ==
During initial planning, Line 13 considered the use of 4 car L-type light metro trains for operation. However, severe congestion issues appeared just after the opening of Line 3, which only uses low capacity 3 car Type B trains and Line 6 which uses even lower capacity 4 car Type L light metro trains, prompted heavy public criticism.

By 2013, plans had changed. With a predicted daily ridership of 1.44m when complete, the approval for Phase 1 specified 8 car type A trains with a maximum speed of 100 km/h (62 mph) and 1500V DC overhead wires. Seventeen trains would initially be needed. CRRC Dalian won the ¥740m contract to build the trains, with the first two handed over to Guangzhou Metro on 18 May 2017.

In 2020, CRRC Dalian won another ¥2.5b to build another 42 trains in preparation for Phase 2. These trains are identical to the first batch from the exterior, but feature new permanent magnet motors and upgraded LCD passenger information screens. The first train arrived at Huanggang depot in May 2026.
