= Chebei station =

Guangzhou Metro Line 4 and Line 13 station

Chebei 车陂
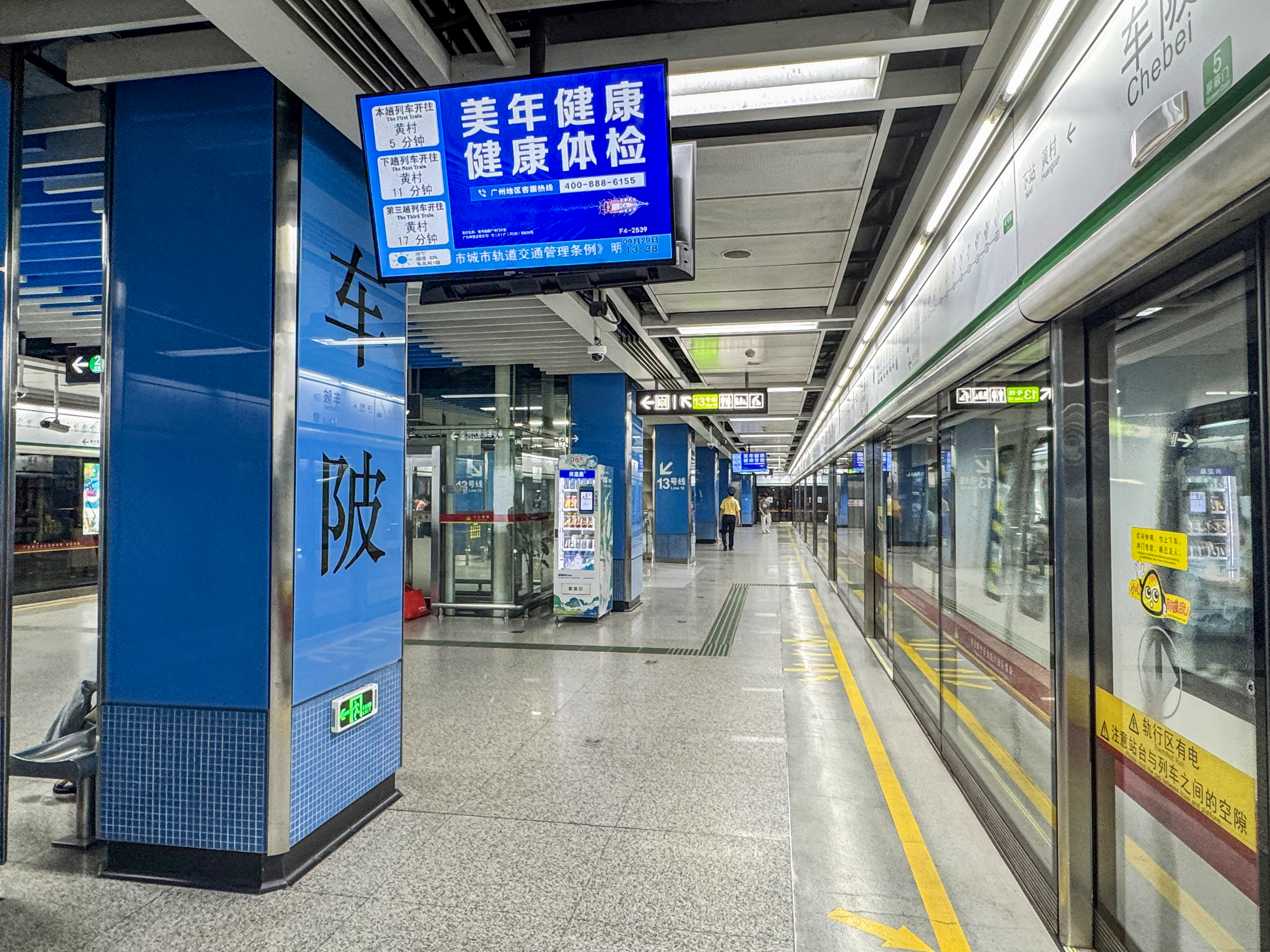
- Line 4 Platform 1 (towards Huangcun)

Chinese name
- Simplified Chinese: 车陂站
- Traditional Chinese: 車陂站
Transcriptions
Standard Mandarin
- Hanyu Pinyin: Chēbēi Zhàn
Yue: Cantonese
- Yale Romanization: Chēbēi Jaahm
- Jyutping: Ce^{1}bei^{1} Zaam^{6}
- Hong Kong Romanization: Che Pei station

General information
- Location: Zhongshan Avenue Middle (中山大道中); Chebei Subdistrict, Tianhe District, Guangzhou, Guangdong; China
- Coordinates: 23°07′36.58″N 113°23′24.03″E
- Operator: Guangzhou Metro Co. Ltd.
- Lines: Line 4; Line 13
- Platforms: 4 (2 island platforms)
- Tracks: 4

Construction
- Structure type: Underground
- Accessible: Yes

Other information
- Station code: 423 1322

History
- Opened: Line 4: 25 September 2010 (15 years ago); Line 13: 29 September 2025 (10 months ago)

Services
Preceding station	Guangzhou Metro	Following station
Huangcun Terminus	Line 4	Chebeinan towards Nansha Passenger Port
Tangxia towards Tianhe Park	Line 13	Tianhe Zhucun towards Xinsha
Location

Chebei Station (simplified Chinese: 车陂站; traditional Chinese: 車陂站; pinyin: Chēbēi Zhàn; Cantonese Yale: Chēbēi Jaahm) is an interchange station between Line 4 and Line 13 of the Guangzhou Metro. It is located at the underground of the junction of Chebei Road and Zhongshan Avenue (zh) in Tianhe District. Line 4 started operations on 25 September 2010. Line 13 started operations on 29 September 2025.

== Station layout ==
The station is divided into two sections: Line 4 and Line 13, which are parallel but not aligned. The two stations are connected by transfer channels via the concourse and platform level. The station is surrounded by Zhongshan Avenue, Chebei North Street, BRT Chebei Station, Chebei Haojia Academy and adjacent buildings.

=== Line 4 ===
Line 4 has two underground floors. The ground level are Exits C and D, the first floor is the concourse and the second floor is the Line 4 platform.

=== Line 13 ===
Line 13 has four underground floors. The ground level are Exits A and B, the first floor is the mezzanine level which connects Exit B and the concourse, the upper floor is the upper transfer concourse toward Line 4. The second floor is the Line 13 concourse, the third floor is the lower transfer concourse and equipment level, and the fourth floor houses the Line 13 platform.

=== Concourse ===
The concourse has 2 sections: Line 4 and Line 13, in which the Line 4 concourse is located on the first underground floor whilst the Line 13 concourse is located on the second underground floor. The two are connected by paid area and non-paid area transfer passages.

To facilitate pedestrian access, the north side of the Line 4 concourse and the south side of the Line 13 concourse are designated as paid areas, of which Line 13 is also equipped with faregates on the Exit B mezzanine to access the paid area transfer passage and the Line 13 accessible elevator. Within these areas, dedicated elevators, escalators, and stairs provide easy access to the platforms.

Ticket machines and customer service centers are available at both concourses and the Exit B mezzanine. In addition, there are convenience stores and other shops as well as self-service automatic vending machines and card recharge machines.

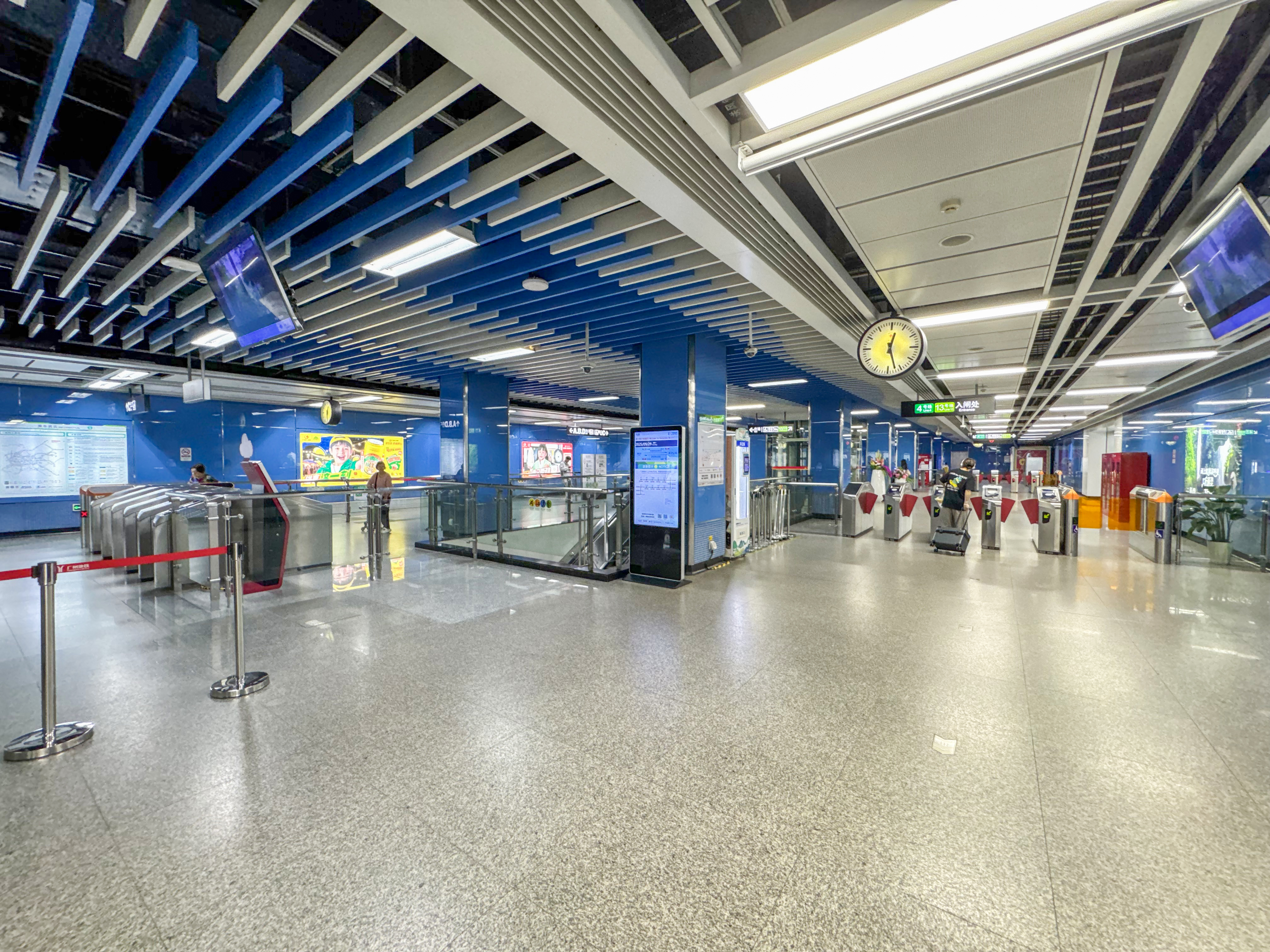
Line 4 concourse

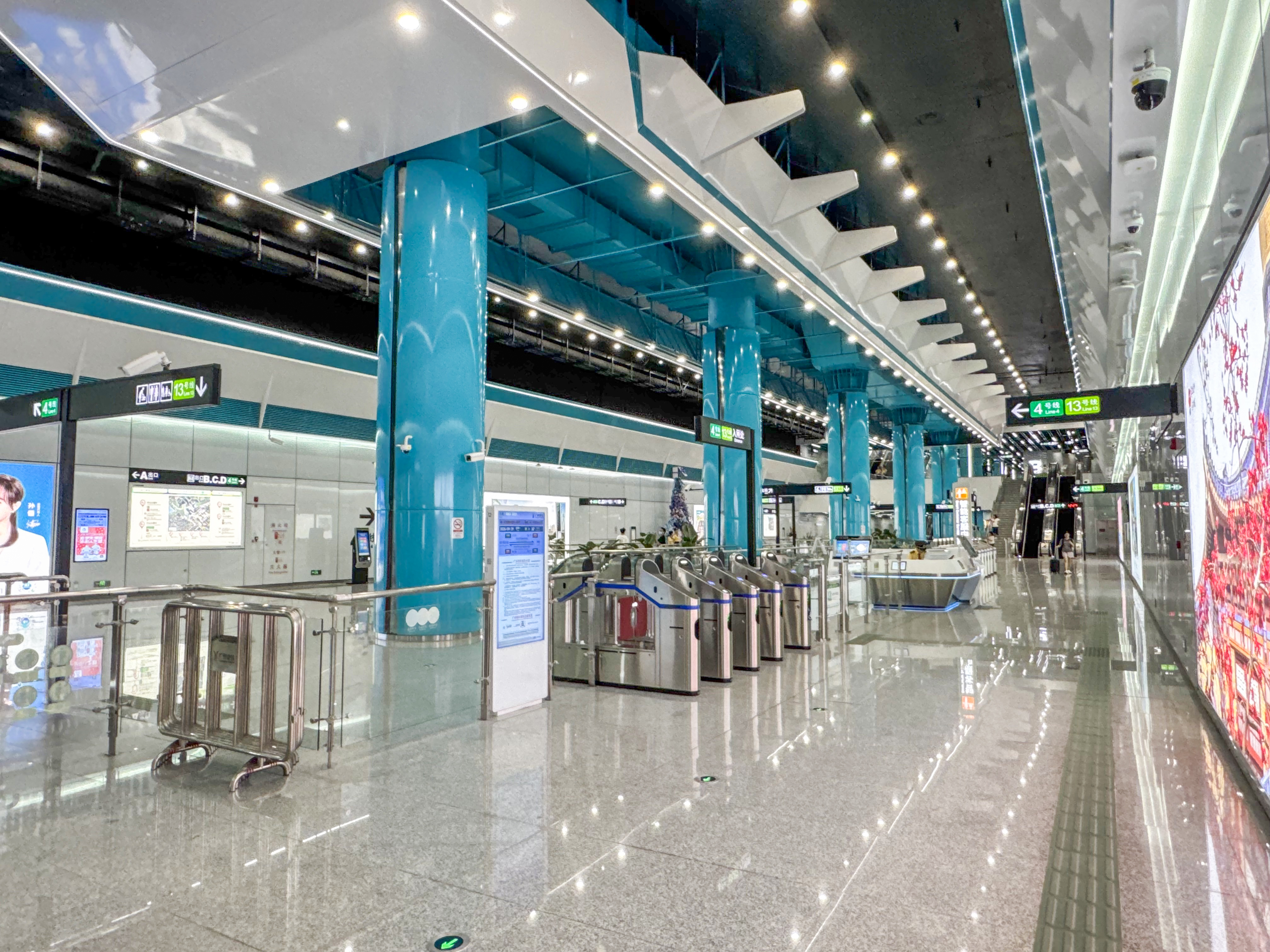
Line 13 concourse

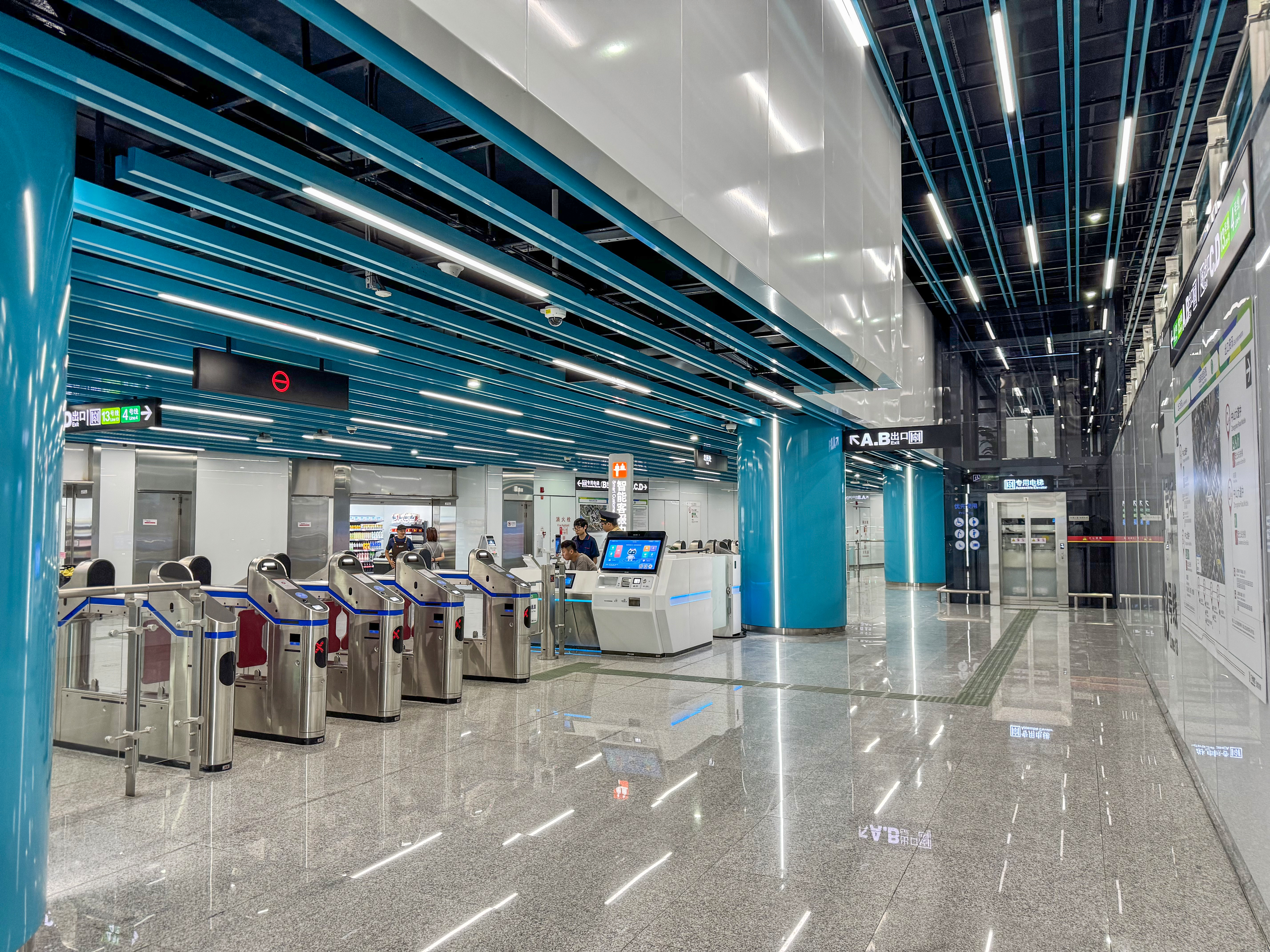
Exit B mezzanine level

=== Transfer ===
The two lines provide transfer through an upper and lower floor. During construction of Line 13, a new transfer mezzanine level was built on the existing Line 4 platform to the lower part of the escalator on the east side of the concourse, and two escalators were added to the transfer passage on the third underground floor of the Line 13 station to the platform or the concourse. Considering that there is a large capacity gap between Line 4 and Line 13, the current passenger flow organization arranges this transfer channel only for passengers getting off on Line 4 to go to Line 13 through this platform transfer interface, whereas passengers alighting Line 13 need to transfer via the concourse and transfer channel.

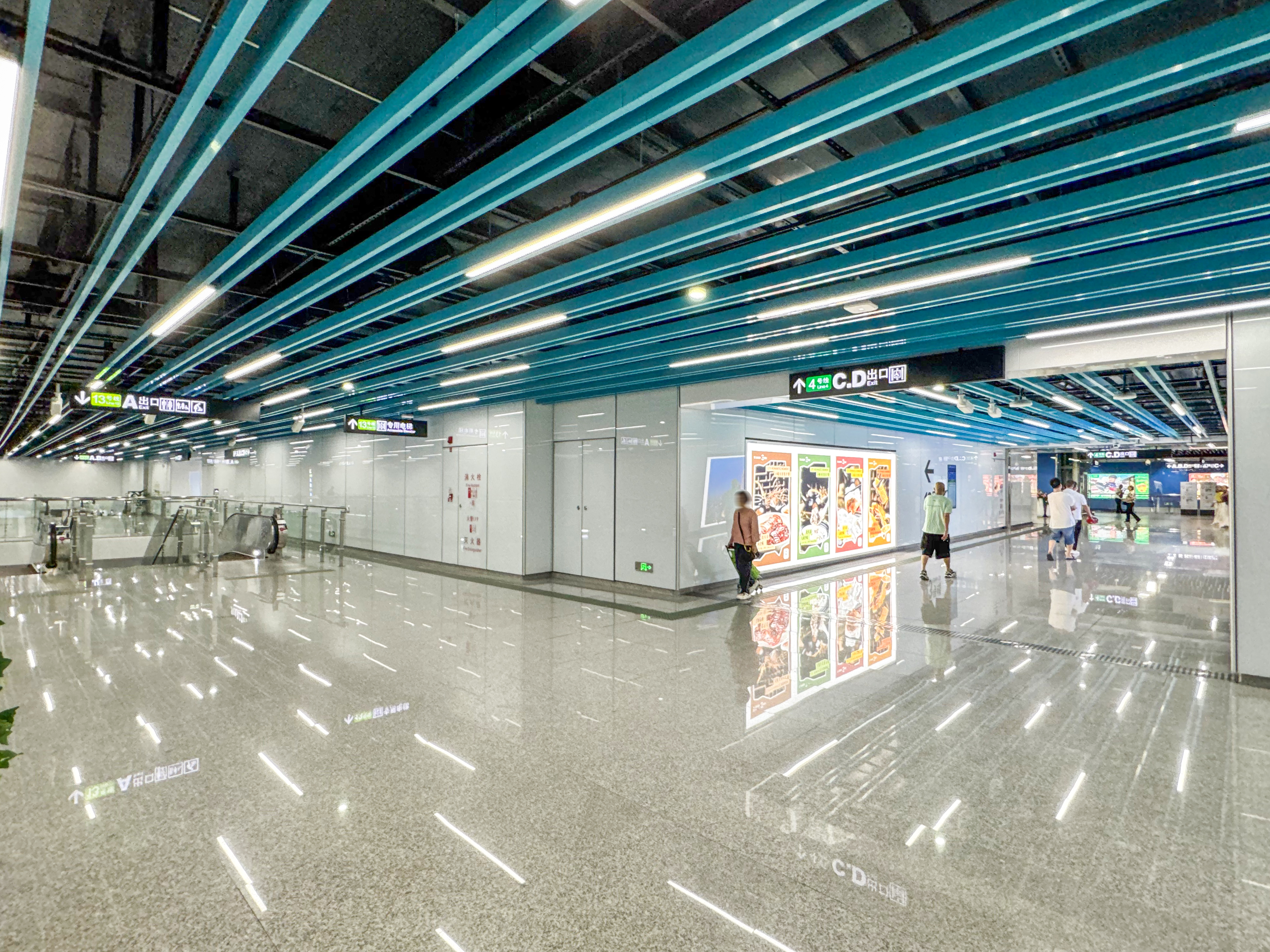
Upper transfer passage

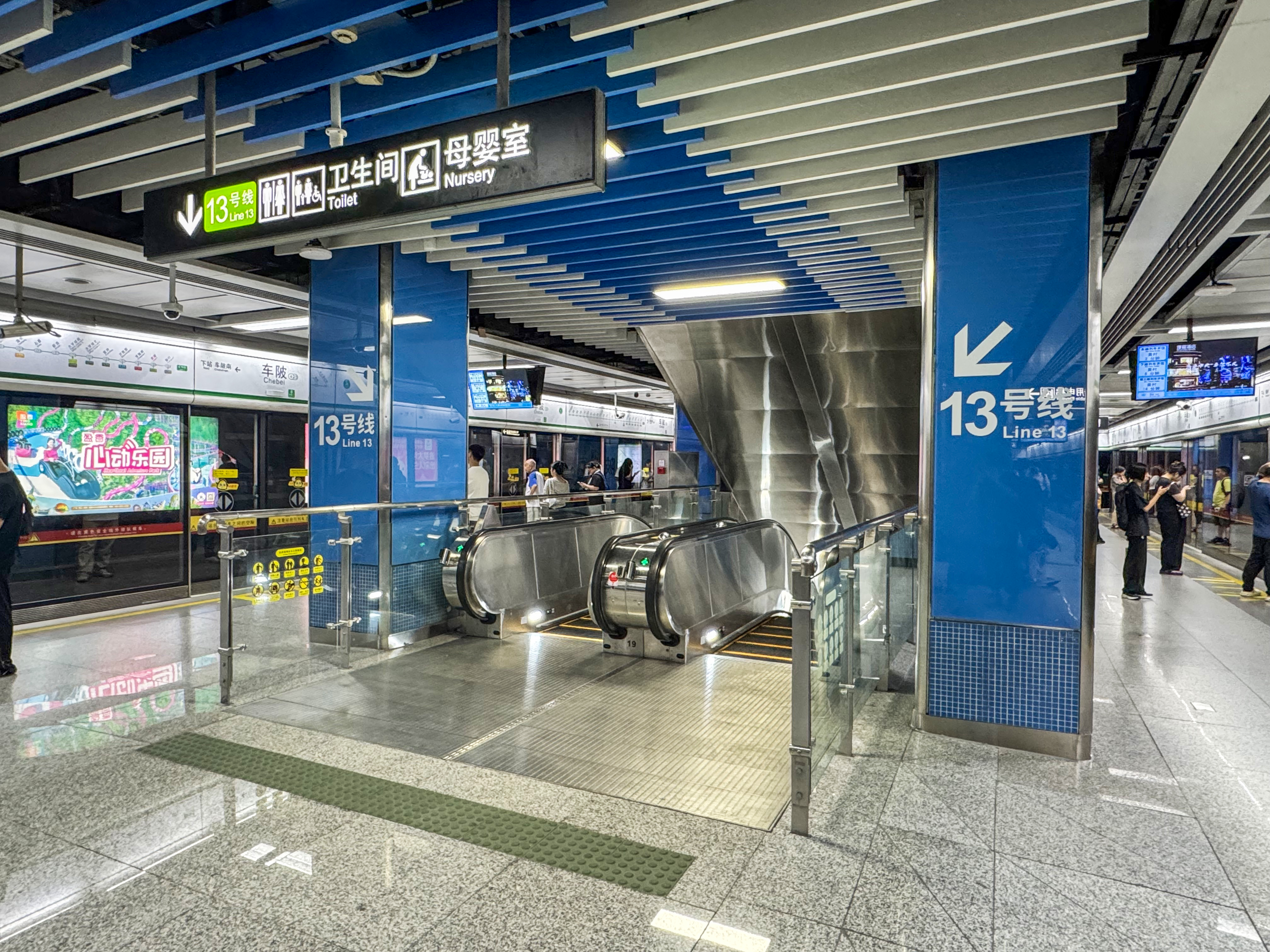
New escalator on Line 4 platform to connect to Line 13 platform

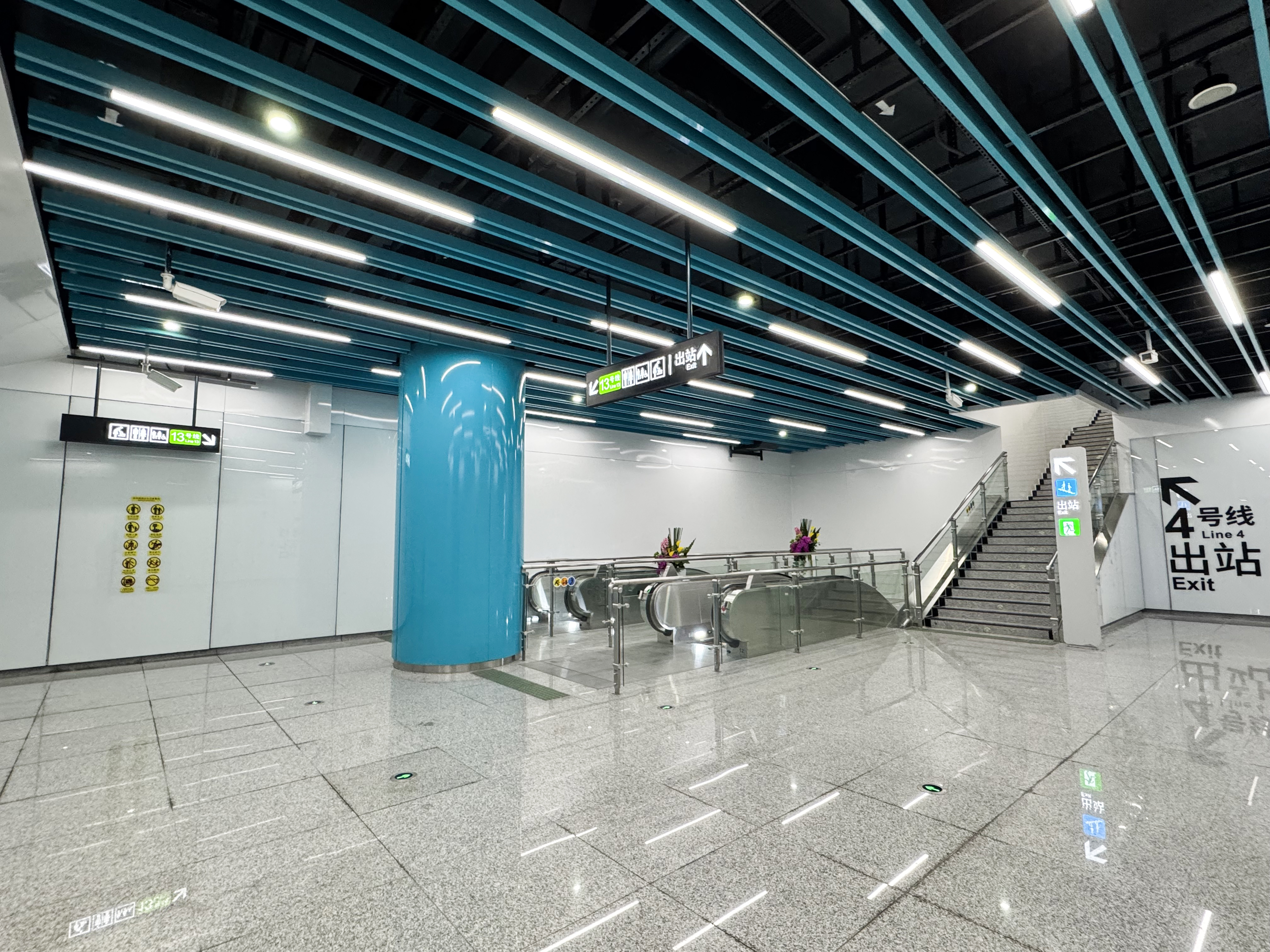
Lower transfer passage leading to concourse and Line 13 platform respectively

=== Platforms ===
Line 4 and Line 13 each have an island platform under Zhongshan Avenue, with Line 4 above and Line 13 below. Toilets and a nursery room are located at the western end of the Line 13 platform towards Tangxia.

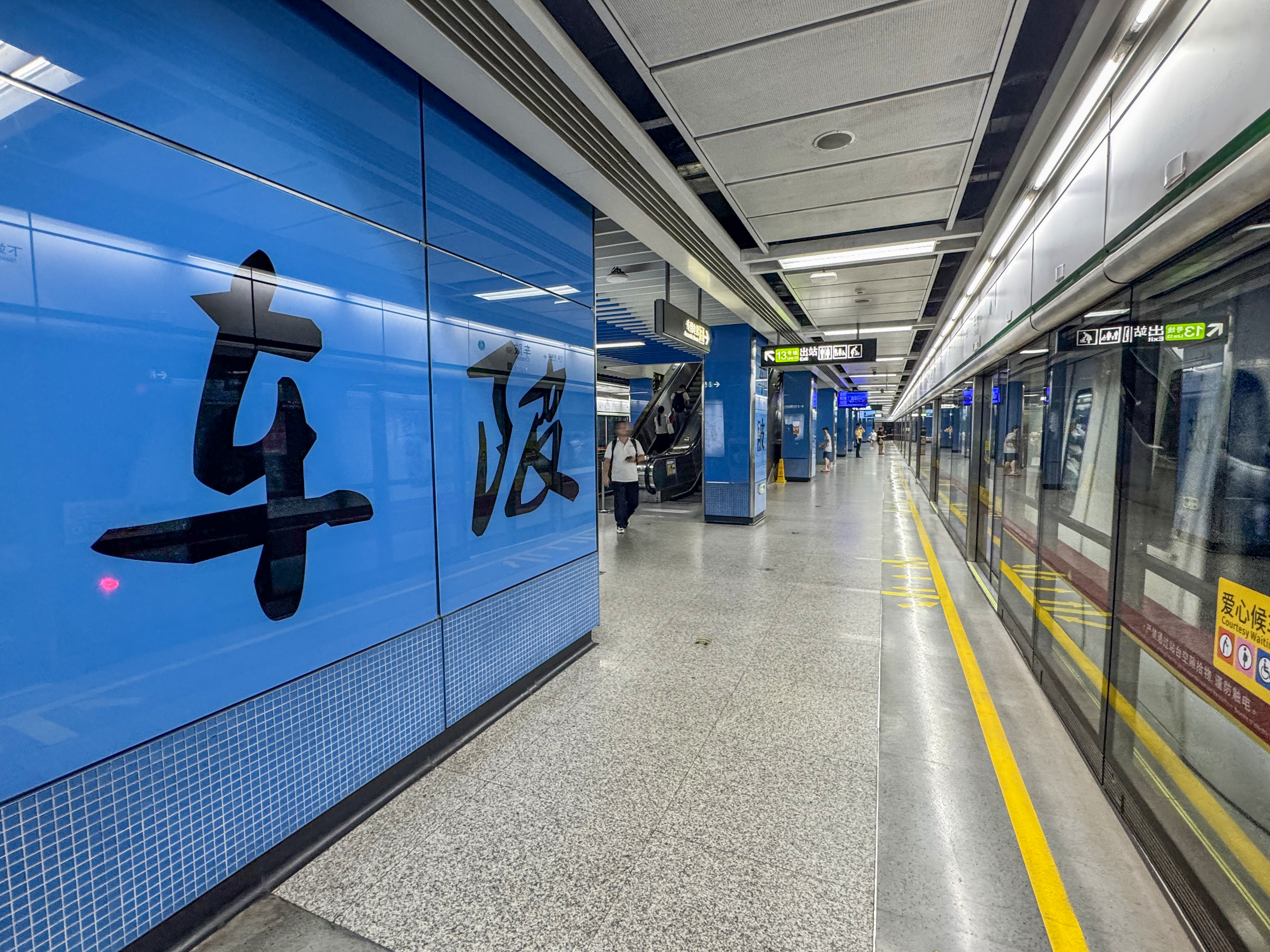
Line 4 platform 2 (towards Nansha Passenger Port)

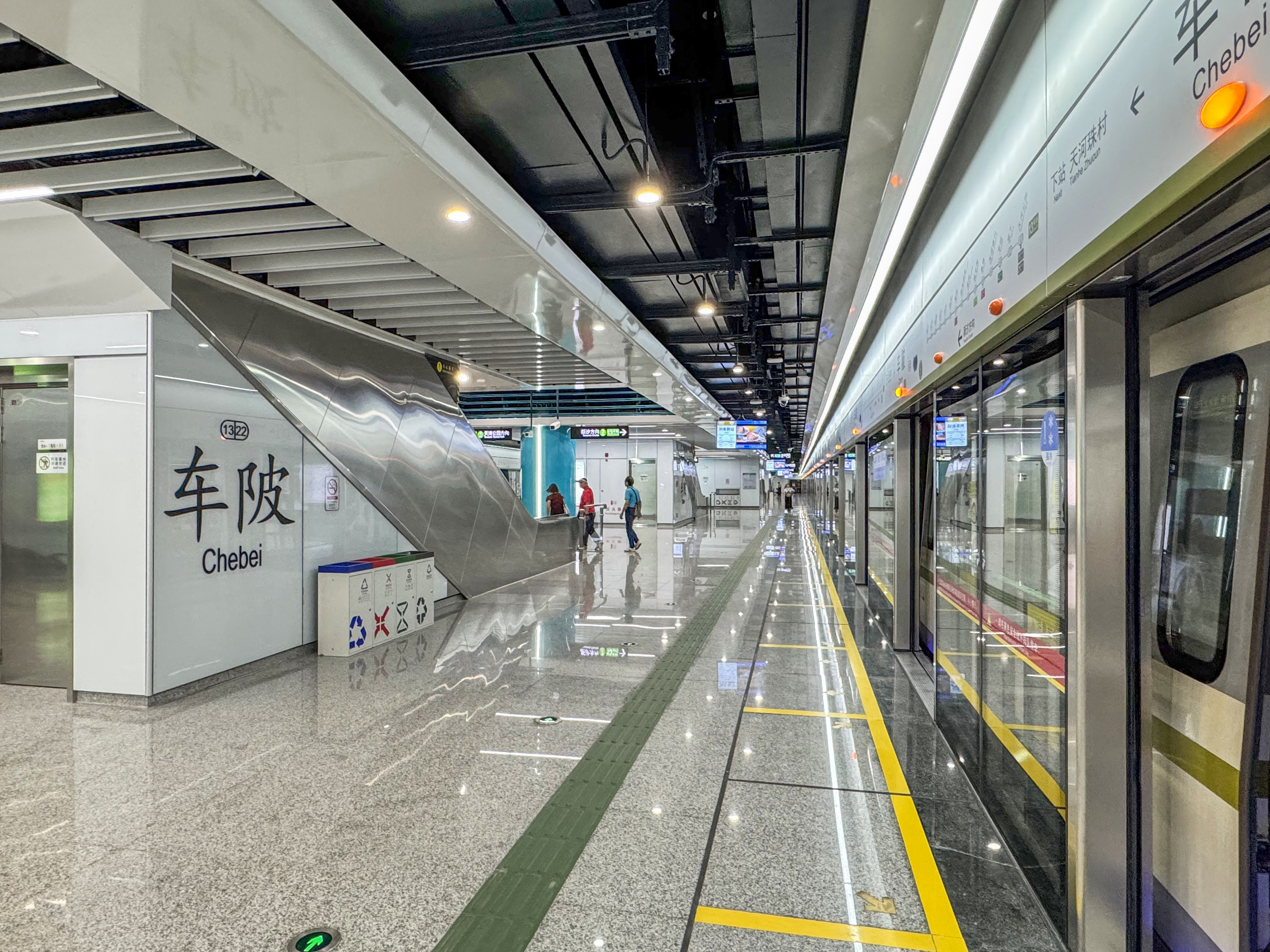
Line 13 platform 3 (towards Xinsha)
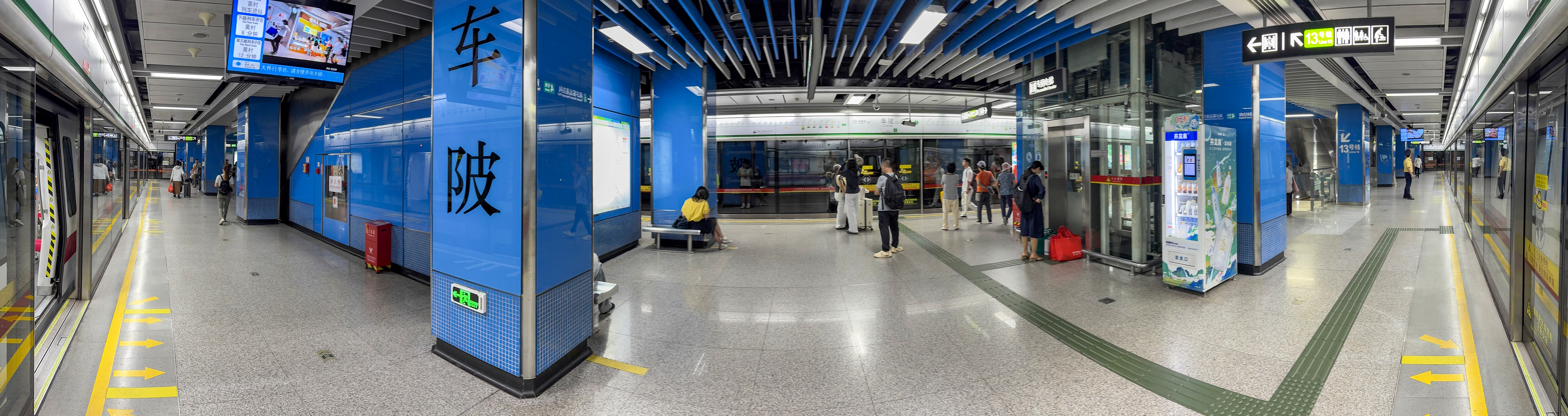
Line 4 platform panorama
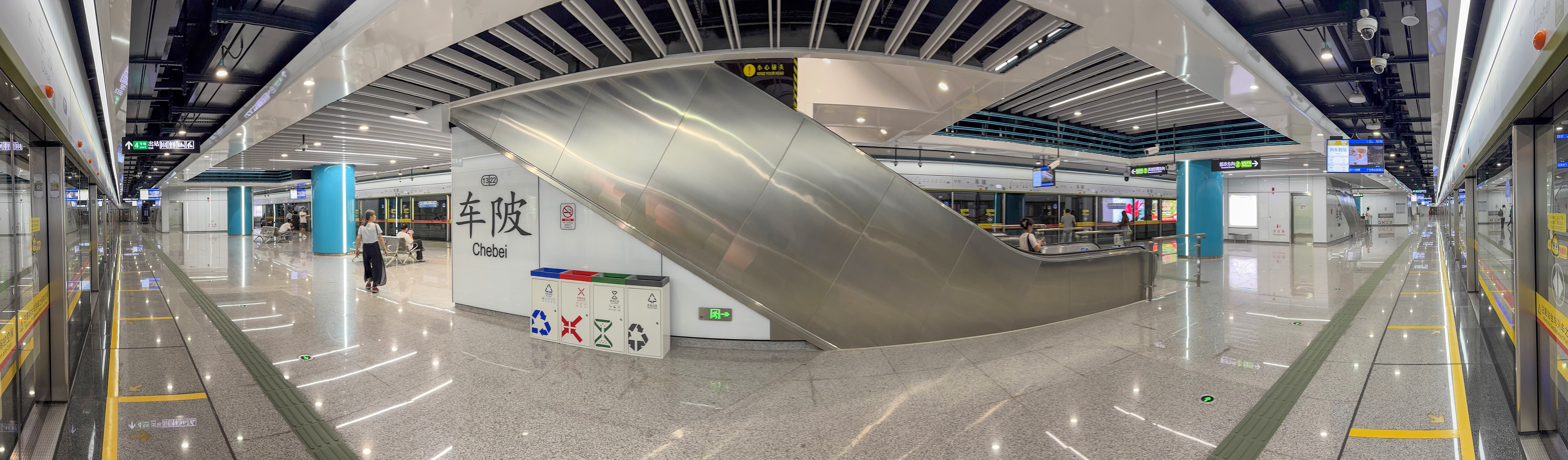
Line 13 platform panorama

=== Entrances/exits ===
The station has 4 points of entry/exit. Exits C and D opened when the station first opened, and both exits are located in the pedestrian area on the south side of Zhongshan Avenue. When Line 13 opened, Exits A and B were added to the north side of Zhongshan Avenue. The vicinity of Exit B has a coffee shop and a fruit and vegetable shop. Exit C is equipped with a stairlift, and Exit B is equipped with an elevator.

- A: Zhongshan Avenue Middle, BRT Chebei Station
- B: Zhongshan Avenue Middle
- C: Zhongshan Avenue Middle
- D: Zhongshan Avenue Middle, BRT Chebei Station
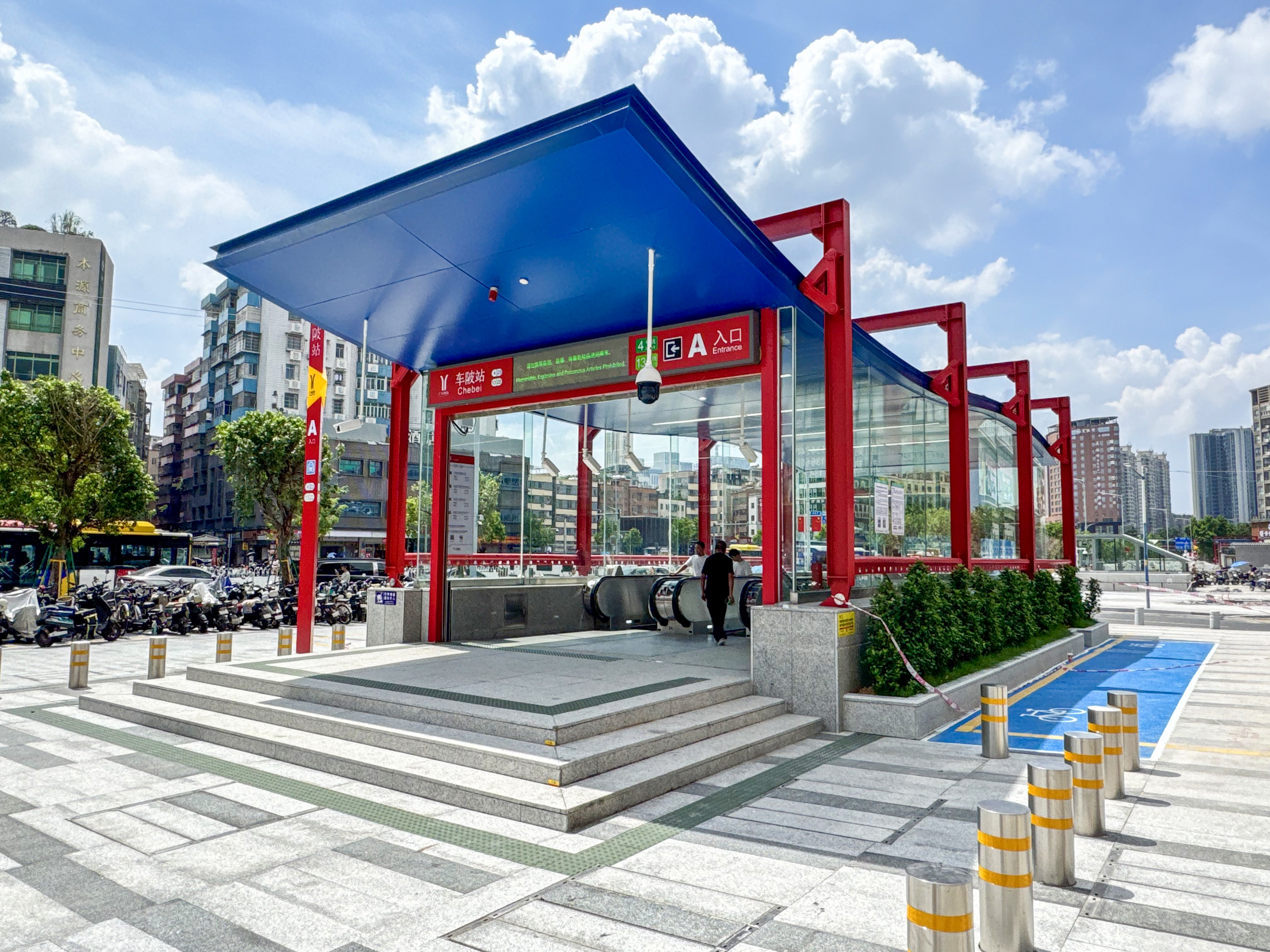
Entrance A

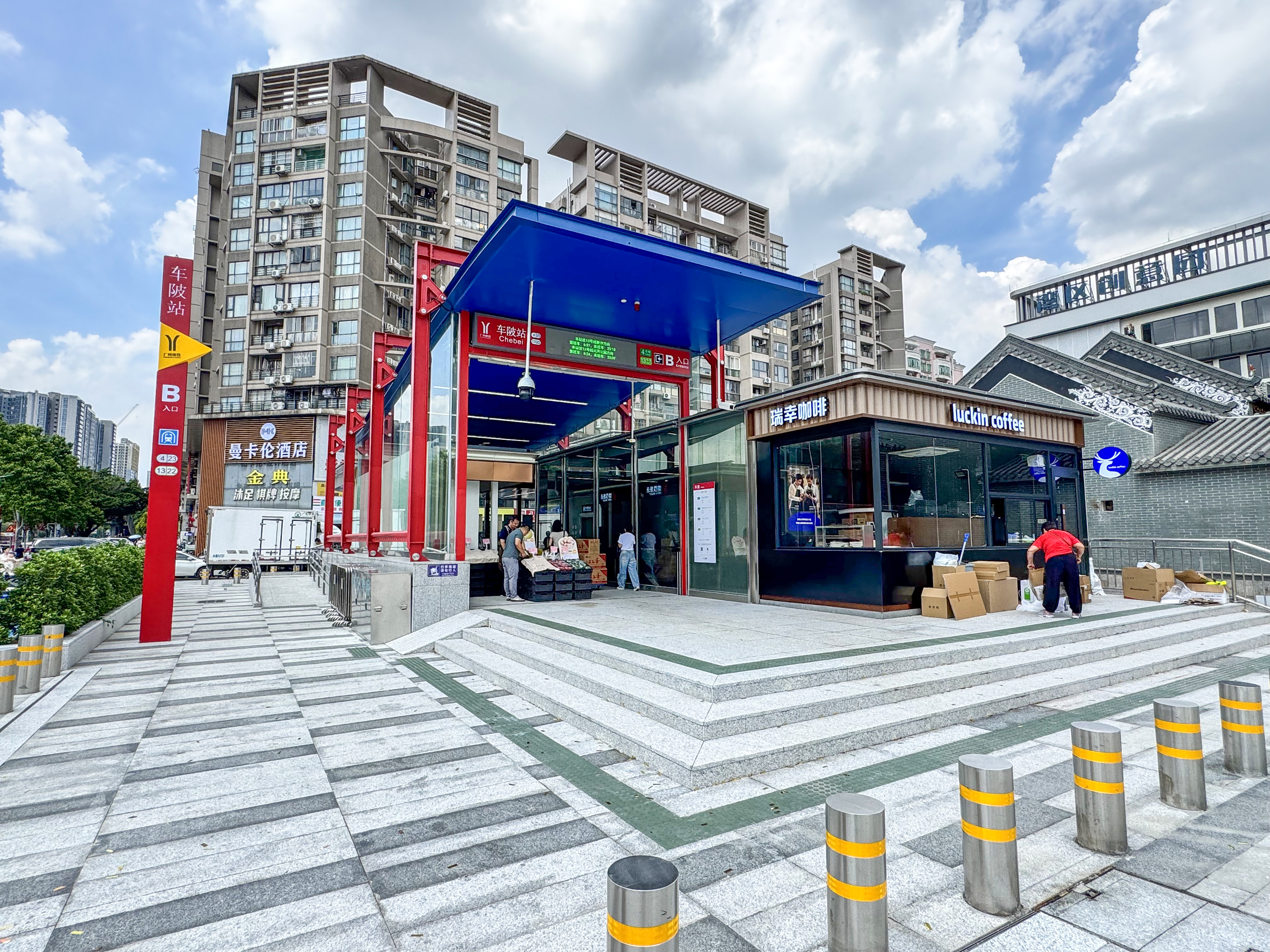
Entrance B (shops)

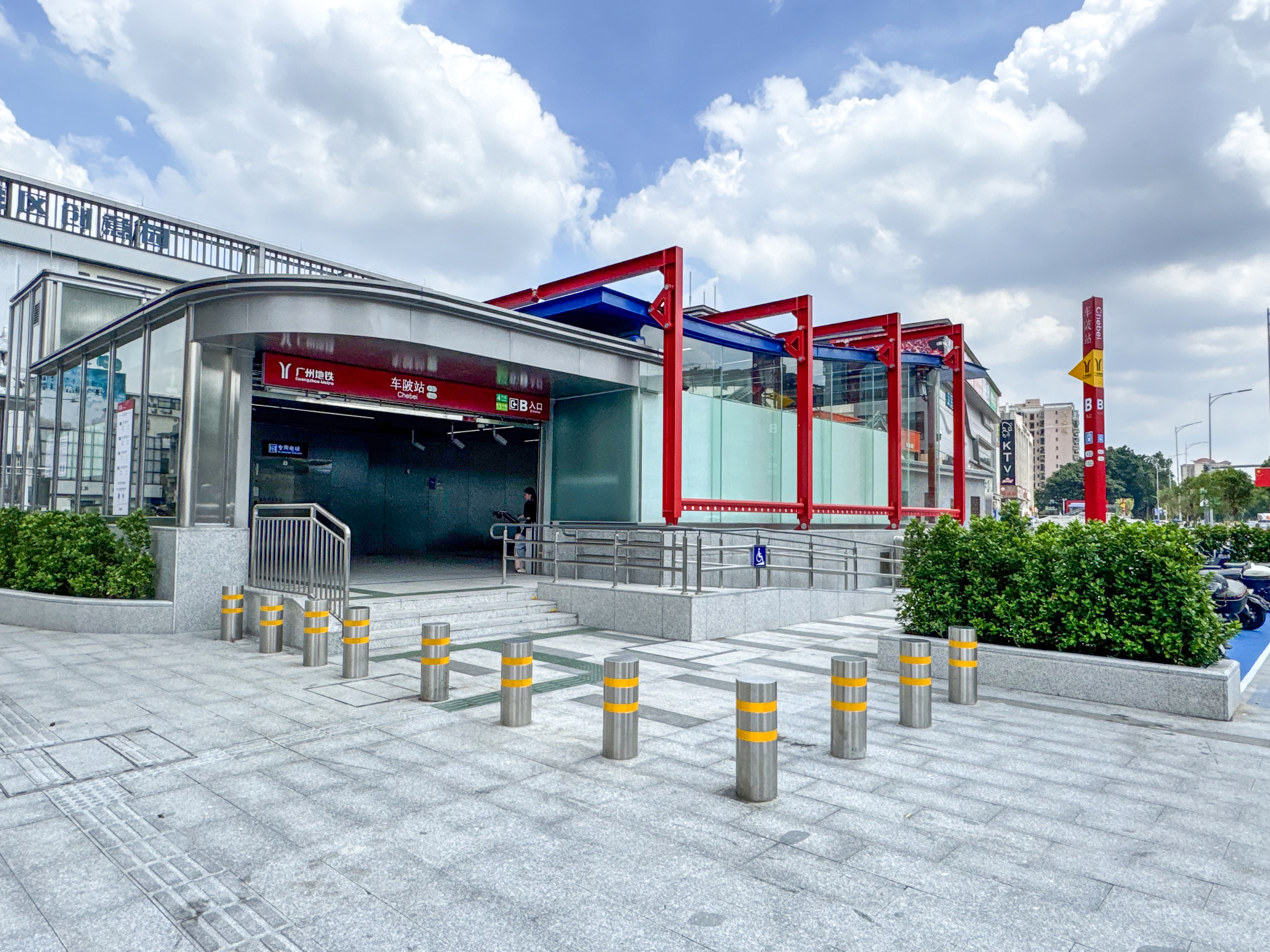
Entrance B

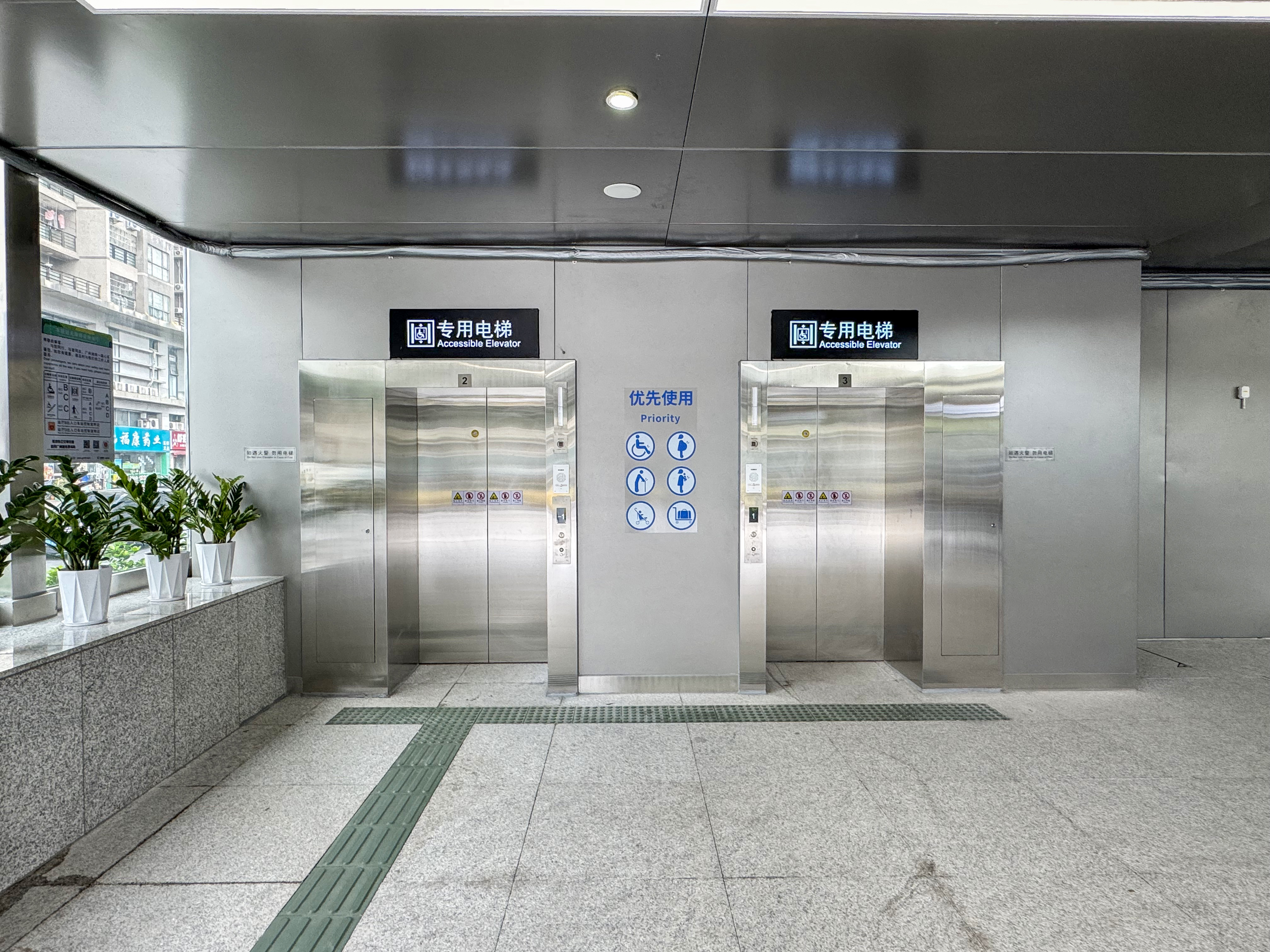
Elevator of Entrance B

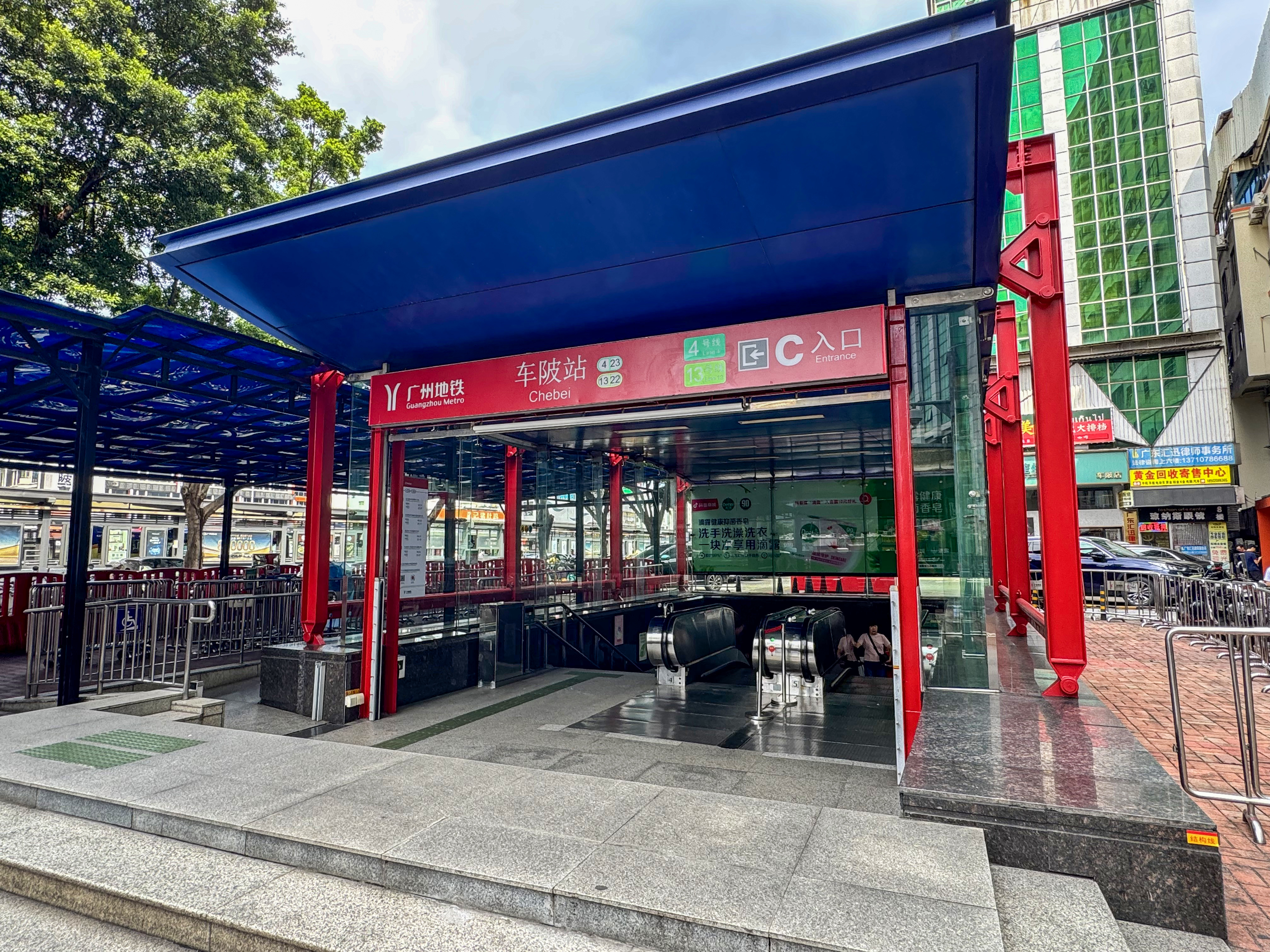
Entrance C

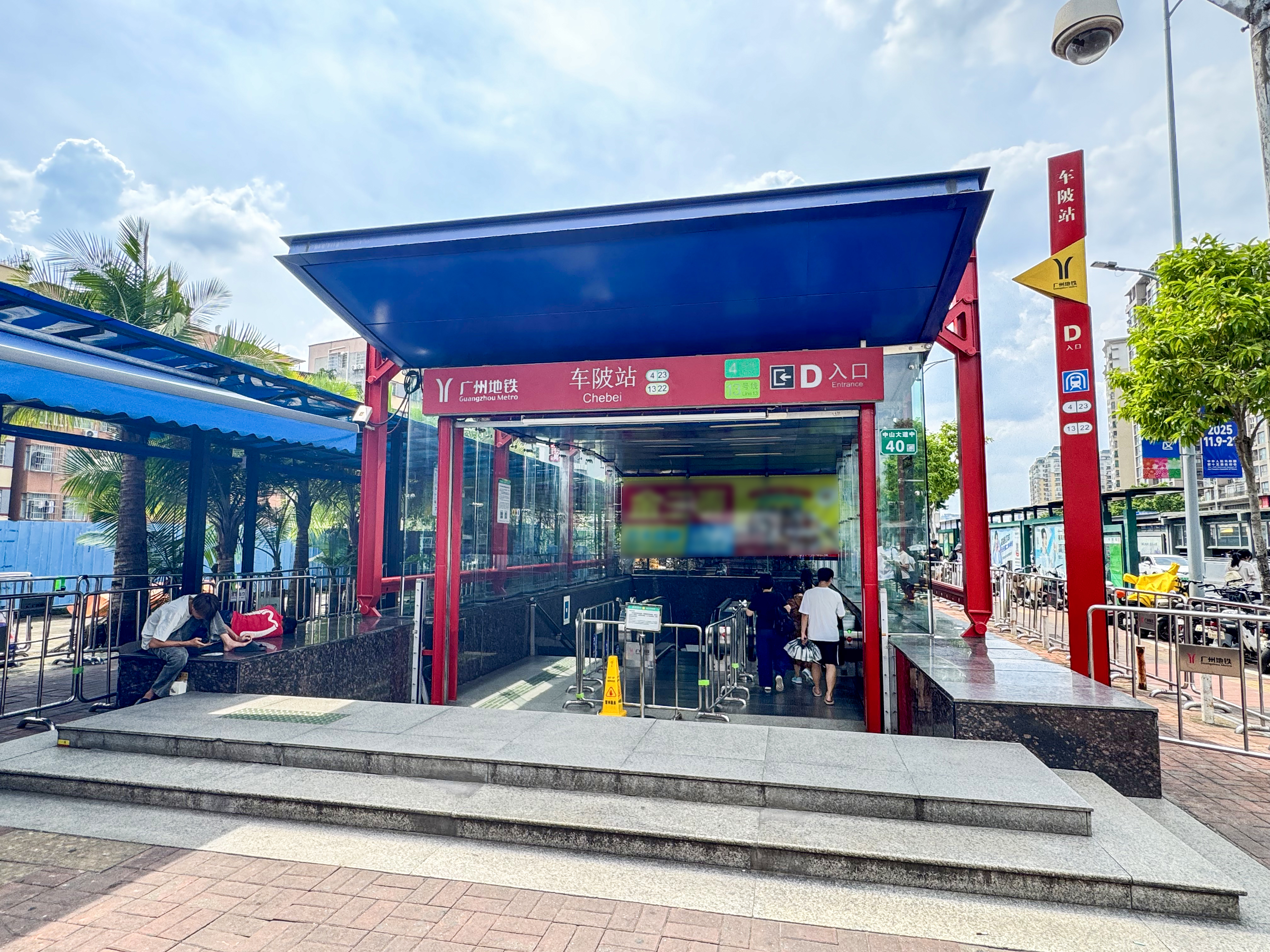
Entrance D

== Usage ==
The station is currently closest to the area of Dongpu, with many residential areas and urban villages nearby, and it is also in close proximity to the BRT Chebei station, so the station usage is quite high.

In order to alleviate pressure at Chebeinan station on Lines 4 and 5, and at the same time prevent the accumulation of too many passengers on the platform of this station and other measures to prevent safety hazards, the station implements passenger flow control measures during the morning rush hour on weekdays to maintain operational order. The peak hours of this station were originally from 08:00 to 09:00, but were brought forward to 07:30 on 16 April 2018, before extending to 09:30 on 18 December 2019 due to the opening of the Line 21 rear section.

== History ==
The station first appeared in the 1997 underground railway plan, when a branch line of Line 5 in Plan A branched out from Pazhou to the World Grand View, and there was a Chebei station that was planned to be set up at the intersection of Zhongshan Avenue on Chebei Road, close to the current location. In the recent implementation of the adjustment plan in 2000, the branch line of Line 5 of the 1997 plan became the current Line 4, and the location of this station has not changed. Until 2003, Line 4 turned east at the intersection of Chebei Road and Zhongshan Avenue, went via on Zhongshan Avenue before it turned onto Daguan South Road. This station was adjusted underground on Zhongshan Avenue along with the line alignment, and the location was ultimately determined. The station officially started construction in 2007.

In addition, when Line 4 was designed, it was planned to provide transfer to Line 13, so the station was only reserved for the expansion of the north side of the station for concourse transfer during construction. The current design was changed to underground construction on the northeast side of the station of Line 4 in the subsequent station design of Line 13.

On 2 July 2010, the hot slip track test of the Line 4 north extension from Chebeinan (not including) to Huangcun was successful. On 25 September 2010, the Line 4 station opened with the northern extension from Chebeinan to Huangcun.

During COVID-19 pandemic control rules at the end of 2022, due to the impact of prevention and control measures, station service was suspended from 26 to the afternoon of 30 November 2022.

Construction of the Line 13 station enclosure started on 28 June 2020. The station began excavation on 25 April 2022, and construction of the connection to Line 4 and transfer levels started in 2024. In order to meet the needs of transfers, the existing fare-paid area of the Line 4 concourse was redivided from the south side to the north side, and passages were opened in the middle and east of the north side of the concourse to connect to the Line 13 concourse.

On 31 July 2025, the Line 13 station completed the "three rights" transfer. On 29 September 2025, the Line 13 station opened.
