= Tangxia station =

Guangzhou Metro Line 13 station

Tangxia 棠下
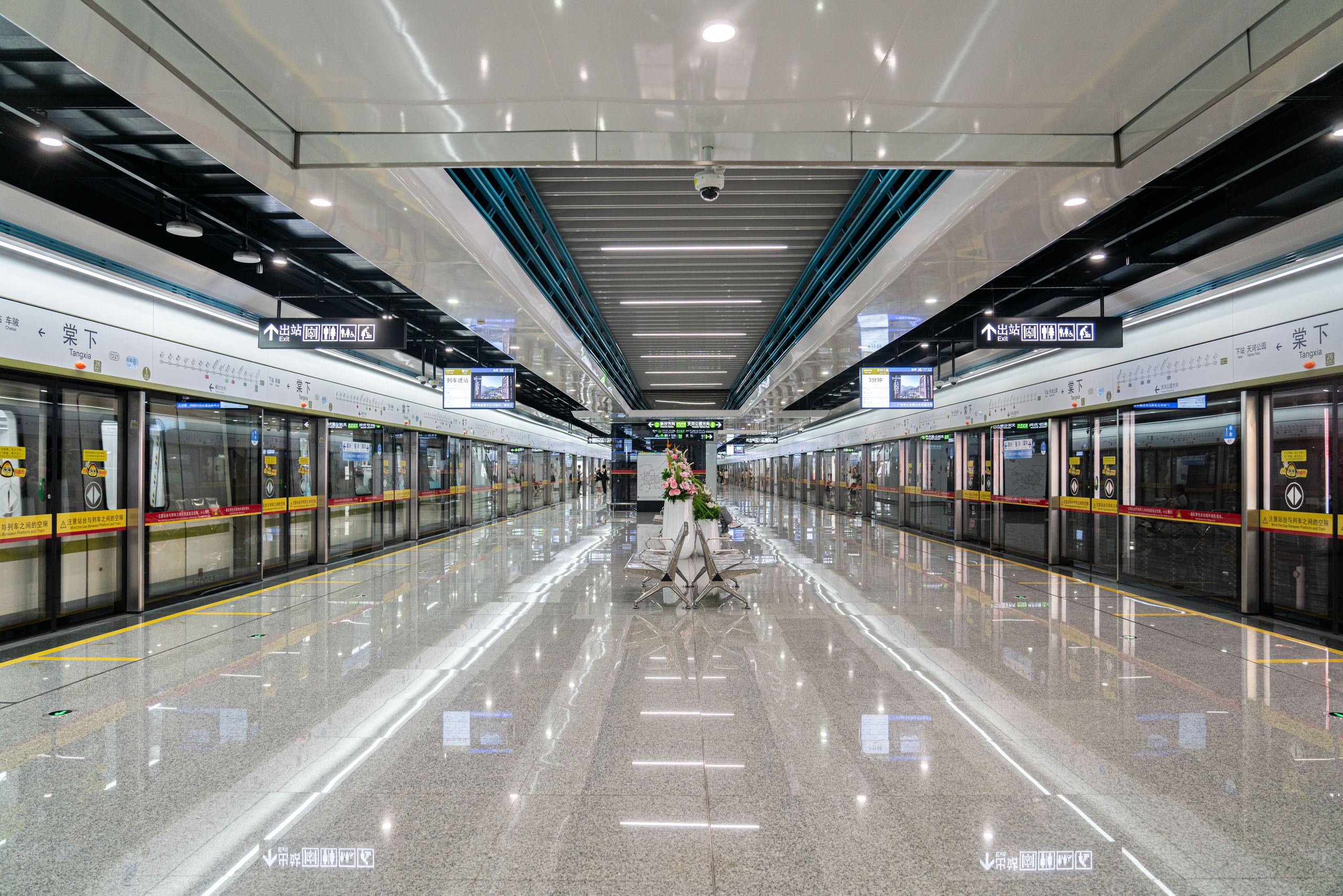
- Platform

Chinese name
- Chinese: 棠下站
Transcriptions
Standard Mandarin
- Hanyu Pinyin: Tángxià Zhàn
Yue: Cantonese
- Yale Romanization: Tòhnghah Jaahm
- Jyutping: Tong^{4} haa^{6} Zaam^{6}

General information
- Location: Intersection of Zhongshan Avenue West (中山大道西) and Xikexin Road (科新路); Tangxia Subdistrict, Tianhe District, Guangzhou, Guangdong; China
- Coordinates: 23°7′40.84″N 113°22′34.18″E
- Operator: Guangzhou Metro Co. Ltd.
- Line: Line 13
- Platforms: 2 (1 island platform)
- Tracks: 2

Construction
- Structure type: Underground
- Accessible: Yes

Other information
- Station code: 1321

History
- Opened: 29 September 2025 (10 months ago)

Services
Preceding station	Guangzhou Metro	Following station
Tianhe Park Terminus	Line 13	Chebei towards Xinsha
Location

Tangxia station (Chinese: 棠下站; pinyin: Tángxià Zhàn; Cantonese Yale: Tòhnghah Jaahm) is a station on Line 13 of the Guangzhou Metro. It is located under the Tangxia Village BRT station and the Tangdong BRT station on the east side of the intersection of Zhongshan Avenue West and Xikexin Road in the Tianhe District of Guangzhou. It station opened on 29 September 2025.

== Station layout ==
The station is a three level station with a total length of 226 metres (741 ft) and a width of 21.1 metres (69 ft). The ground level houses the station entrances and exits, and is surrounded by Zhongshan Avenue West, Kexin Road, Tangxia Village, the BRT Tangxia Village Station, the BRT Tangdong Station, Hopson Junjing Plaza, and other buildings. The first floor houses the station concourse, the second floor is for station equipments, and the third floor houses the Line 13 platform.

=== Concourse ===
The station concourse is equipped with automatic ticket machines and a smart customer service center.

The fare-paid area has elevators, escalators, and stairs installed for passengers to access the platform.

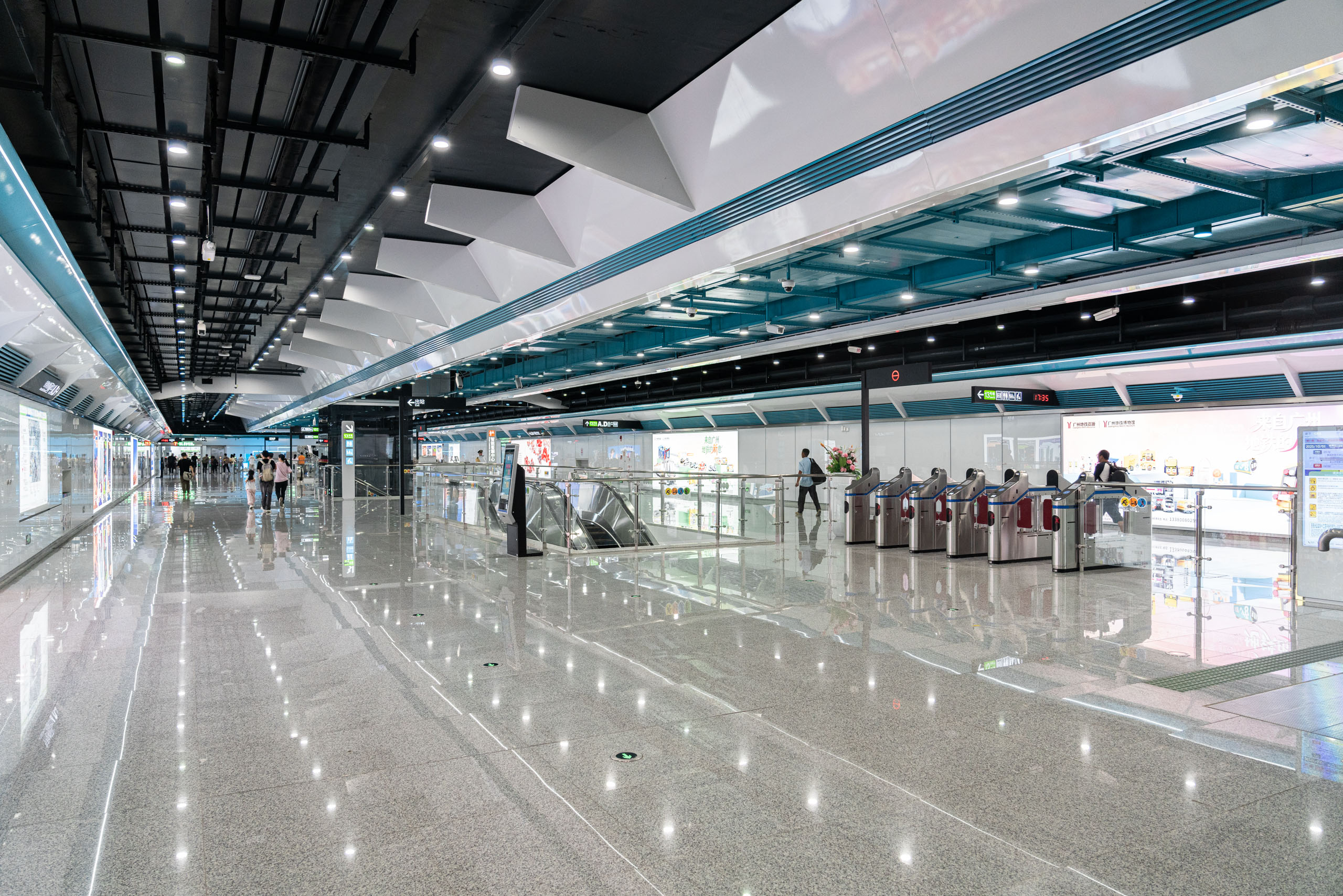
Concourse

=== Platform ===
The station features an island platform located under Zhongshan Avenue West. Toilets and a nursery room are located at the end of the platform towards Tianhe Park.

=== Entrances/Exits ===
The station has 3 points of entry/exit. Exit D2 is equipped with an elevator.

- A: Zhongshan Avenue West, BRT Tangdong Station (Eastbound)
- D1: Zhongshan Avenue West, BRT Tangxiacun Station (Eastbound)
- D2: Zhongshan Avenue West, BRT Tangdong Station (Eastbound), Tangxiacun Station (Eastbound)
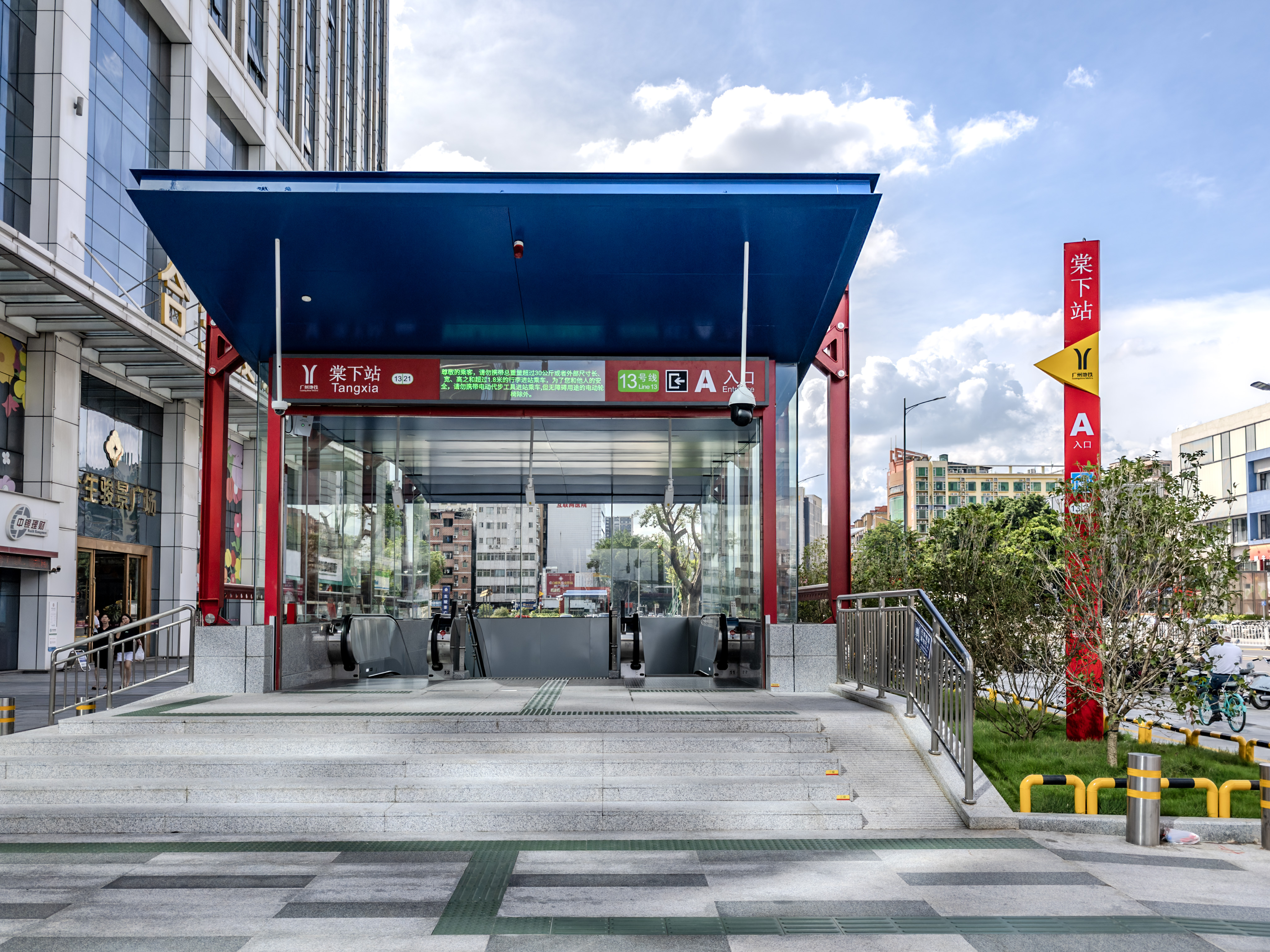
Entrance A

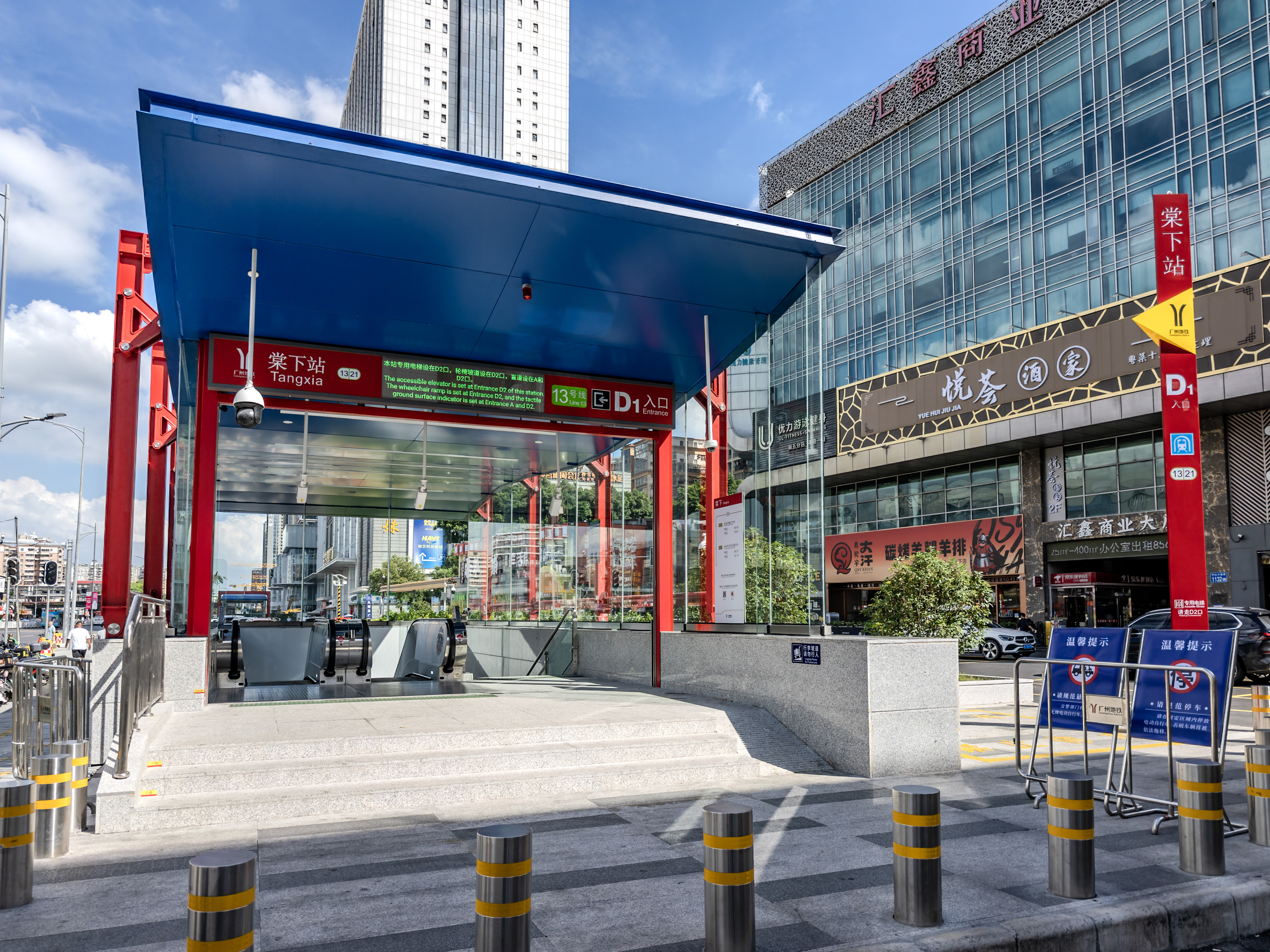
Entrance D1

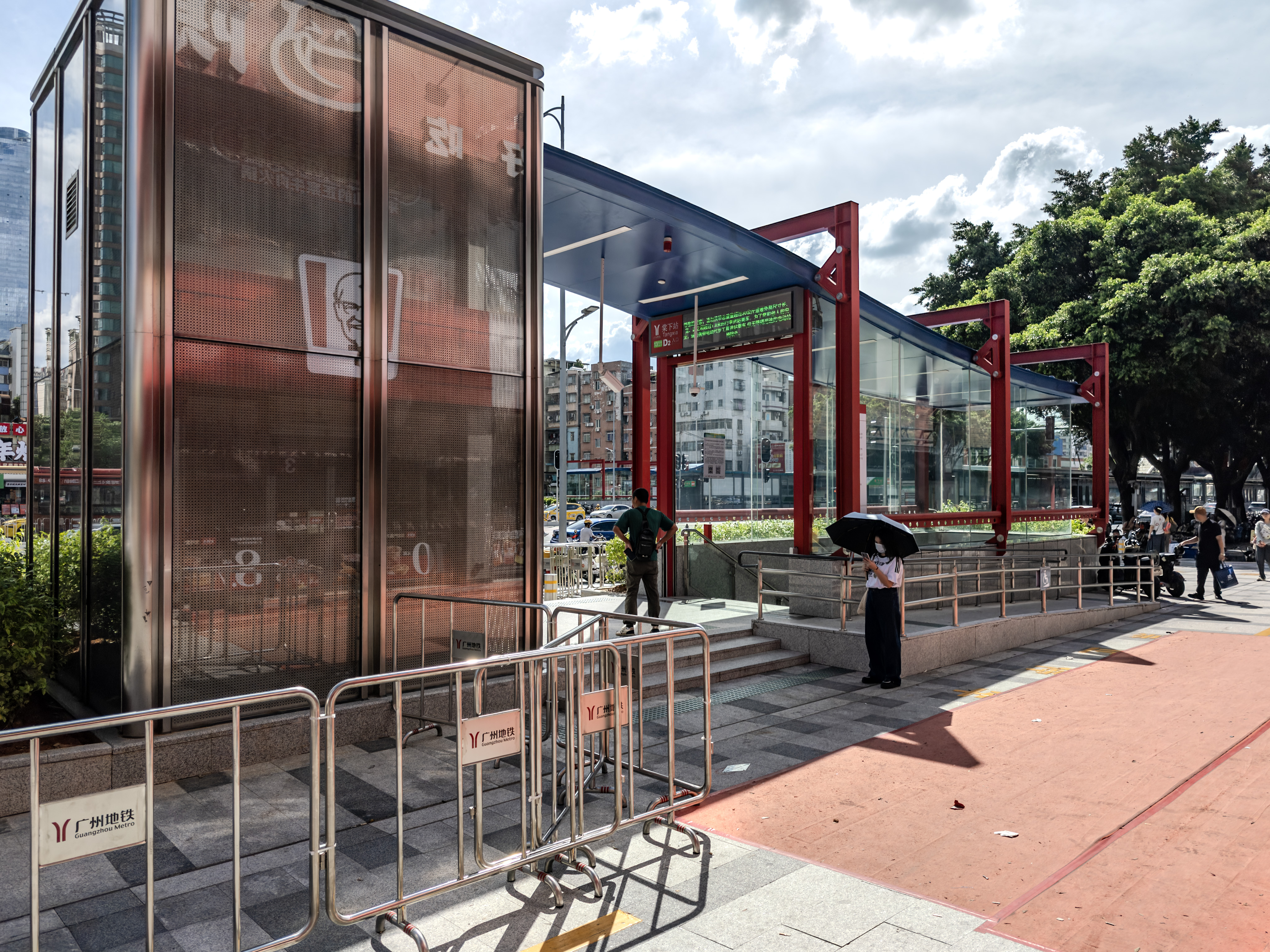
Entrance D2

== History ==
Construction of the station began on 26 October 2018, and entered the enclosure structure construction phase on 7 January 2020, capped the main structure on 26 September 2022, and started the equipment single-machine commissioning in November 2024. In July 2025, the station completed the "three rights" transfer. On 29 September 2025, the station opened.
