= Tianhe Zhucun station =

Guangzhou Metro Line 13 station

Tianhe Zhucun 天河珠村
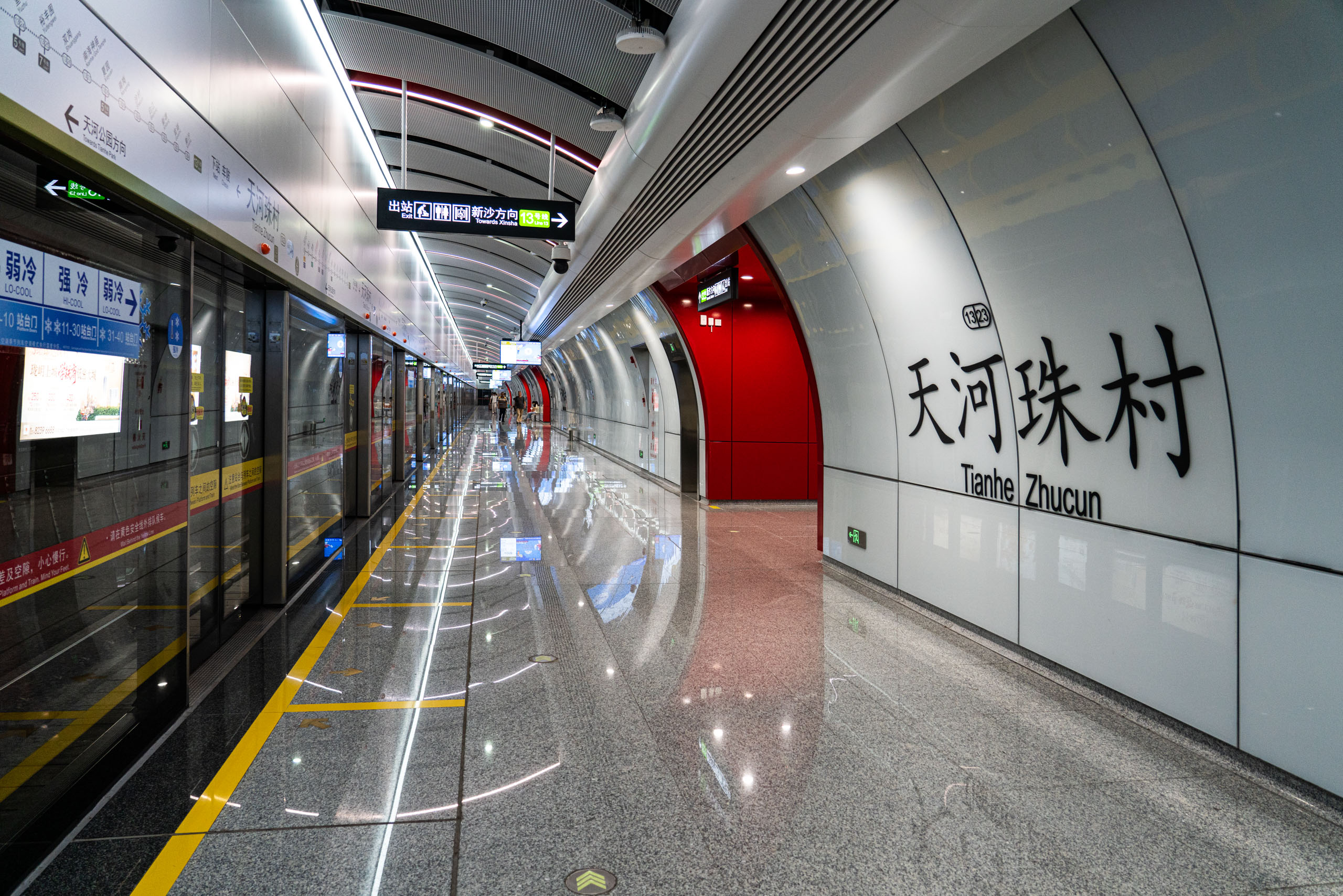
- Platform 2

Chinese name
- Chinese: 天河珠村站
Transcriptions
Standard Mandarin
- Hanyu Pinyin: Tiānhé Zhūcūn Zhàn
Yue: Cantonese
- Yale Romanization: Tīnhòh Jyūchyūn Jaahm
- Jyutping: Tin^{1}ho^{4} Zyu^{1}cyun^{1} Zaam^{6}

General information
- Location: Intersection of Zhongshan Avenue Middle (中山大道中) and Hulin Road (護林路); Qianjin Subdistrict, Tianhe District, Guangzhou, Guangdong; China
- Coordinates: 23°7′8.90″N 113°24′54.46″E
- Operator: Guangzhou Metro Co. Ltd.
- Line: Line 13
- Platforms: 2 (1 split island platform)
- Tracks: 2

Construction
- Structure type: Underground
- Accessible: Yes

Other information
- Station code: 1323

History
- Opened: 29 September 2025 (10 months ago)

Services
Preceding station	Guangzhou Metro	Following station
Chebei towards Tianhe Park	Line 13	Yuzhu towards Xinsha
Location

Tianhe Zhucun station (Chinese: 天河珠村站; pinyin: Tiānhé Zhūcūn Zhàn; Cantonese Yale: Tīnhòh Jyūchyūn Jaahm) is a station on Line 13 of the Guangzhou Metro. It is located under the west of the intersection of Zhongshan Avenue Middle and Hulin Road in Guangzhou's Tianhe District. The station opened on 29 September 2025.

== Station layout ==
The station is a three-floor underground station with a partial fourth floor, with a total length of 223.2 metres (732 ft). The ground floor are the exits, and the surrounding the station are Zhongshan Avenue Middle and its overpass, Yingxi Road, Hulin Road, Zhucun, BRT Zhucun Station and nearby buildings. The first floor is the concourse, the second floor is the station equipment floor, and the third floor is the Line 13 platform.

Due to the limitations of the ground environment and the station structure, the concourse and Platform 1 were constructed using cut-and-cover, while Platform 2 was constructed through underground excavation. The width of the cut-and-cover concourse is 16.8 metres (55 ft), and the width of the excavated platform is 10.2 metres (33 ft).

=== Station design ===
The decoration design of the station integrates the elements of Zhucun's Qixi culture. Among them, the ceiling of the concourse is designed with an asymmetrical wave shape in conjunction with the electromechanical air ducts, and incorporates the “red silk” element. Through the Qixi Gallery, the traditional custom of Qixi on the Qixi Festival is abstracted into silhouette portraits, allowing more citizens and passengers to understand the Qixi culture through the metro station, so that it can be better inherited and spread.

=== Concourse ===
The station concourse is equipped with automatic ticket machines and a smart customer service center.

The north side of the concourse is divided into a fare-paid area, where elevators, escalators, and stairs are installed for passengers to access the platform.

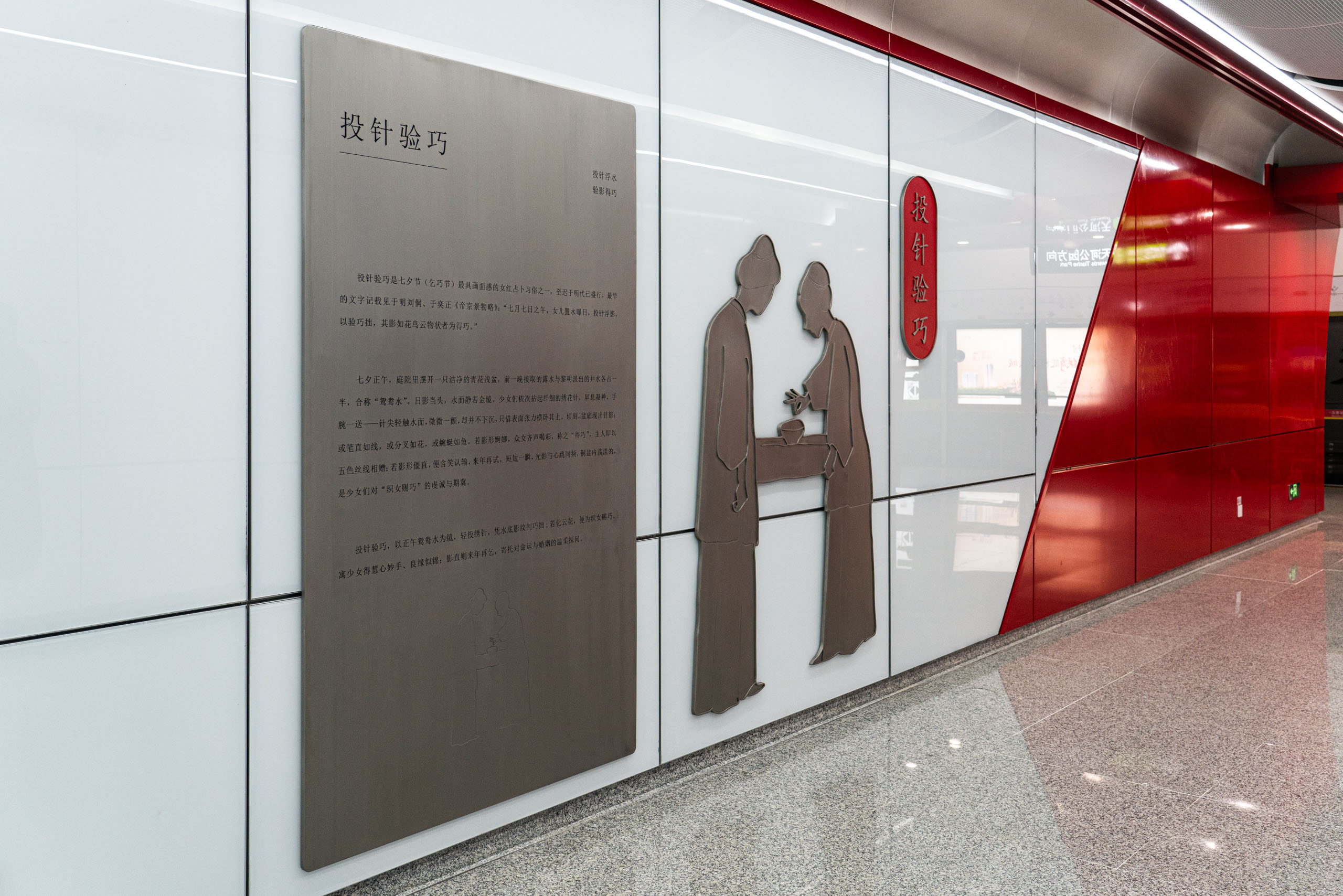
Introduction to Qiqiao Culture (Testing Skill by Throwing Needles) Culture Wall

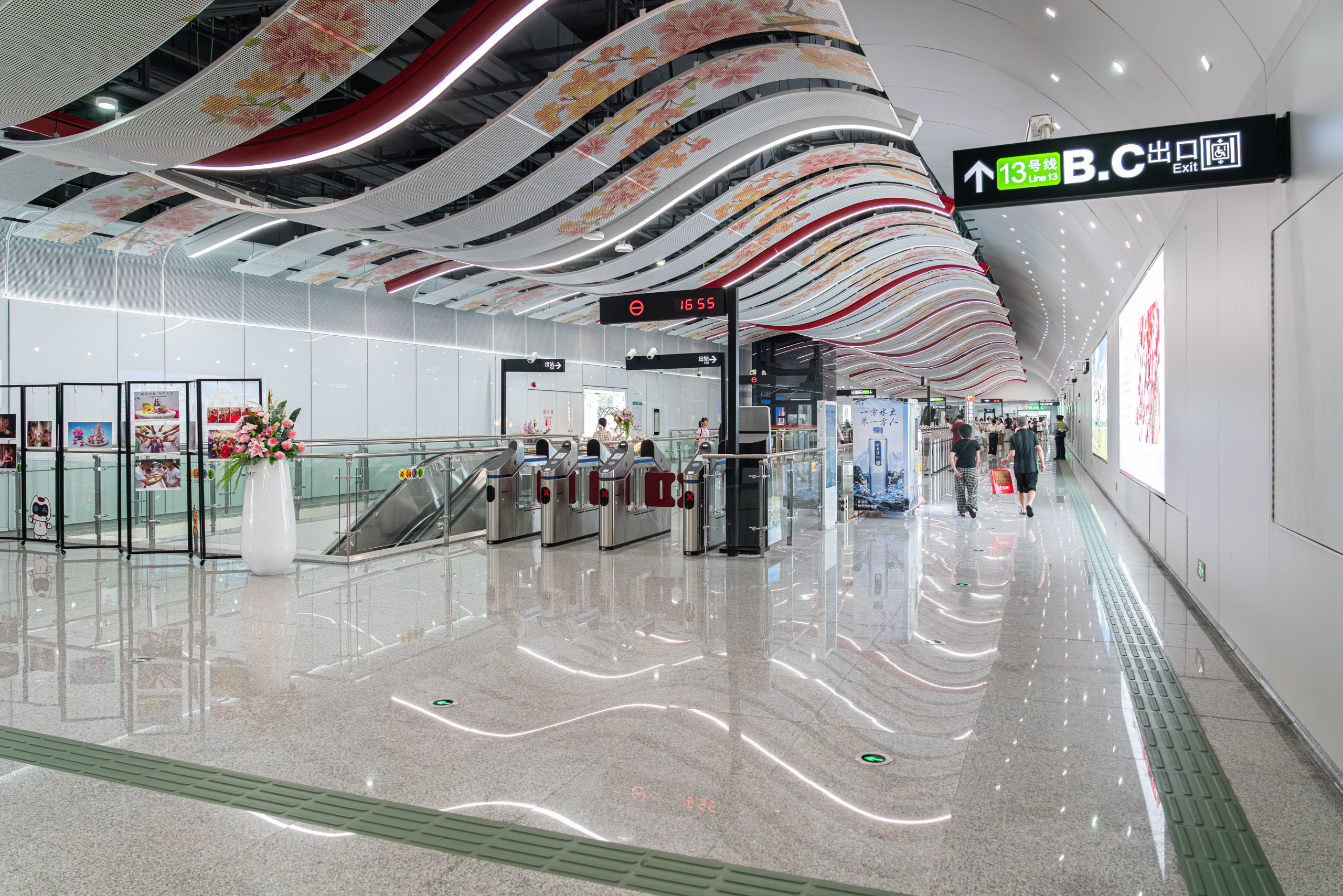
Concourse

=== Platform ===
The station features split platforms, located under Zhongshan Avenue Middle. Due to the station's structural design, escalators, stairs, and elevators connecting the concourse to the platforms are all located on the Platform 1 side. Toilets and a nursery room are also available on one end of Platform 1.

The station also has a single crossover towards Chebei station.

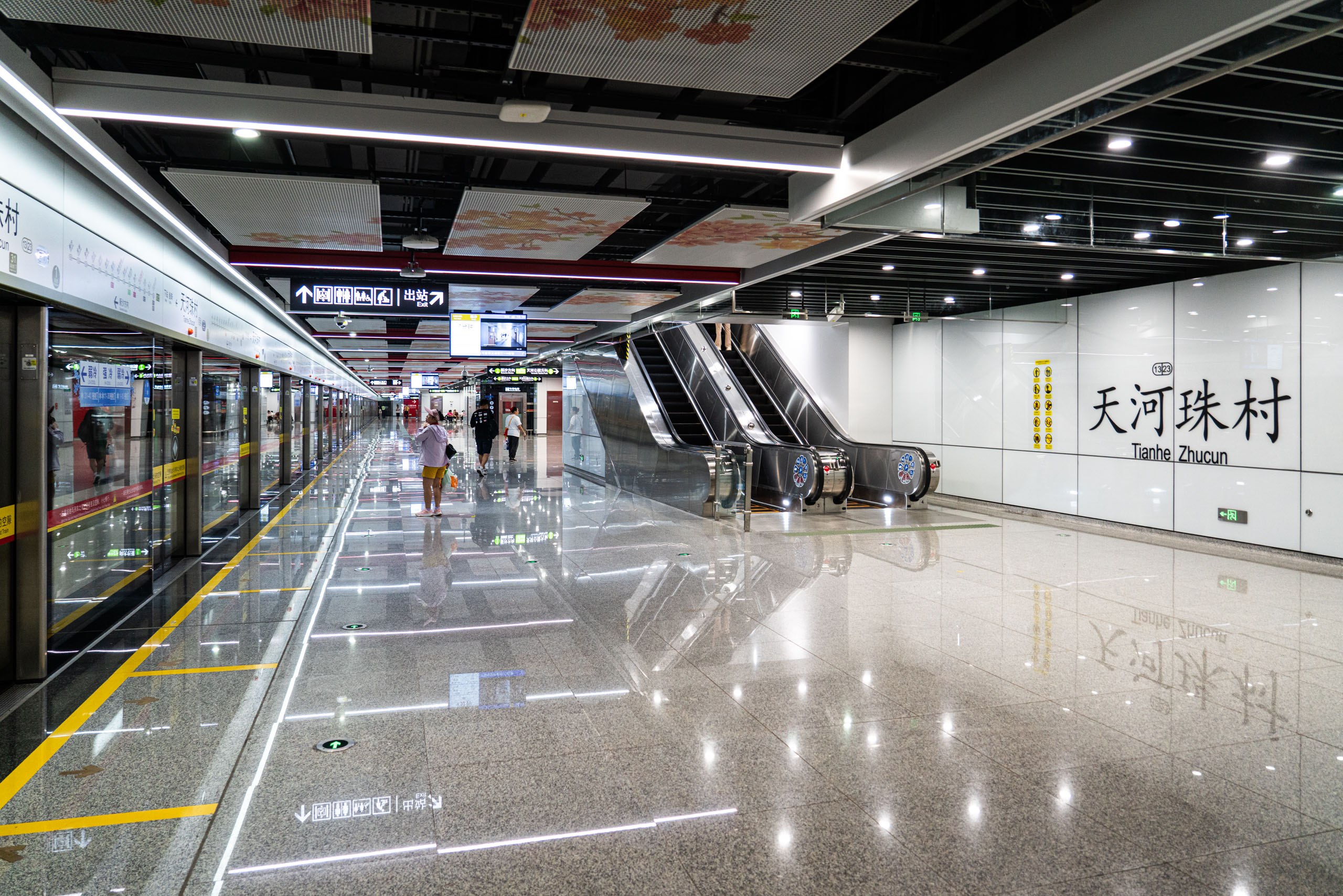
Platform 1

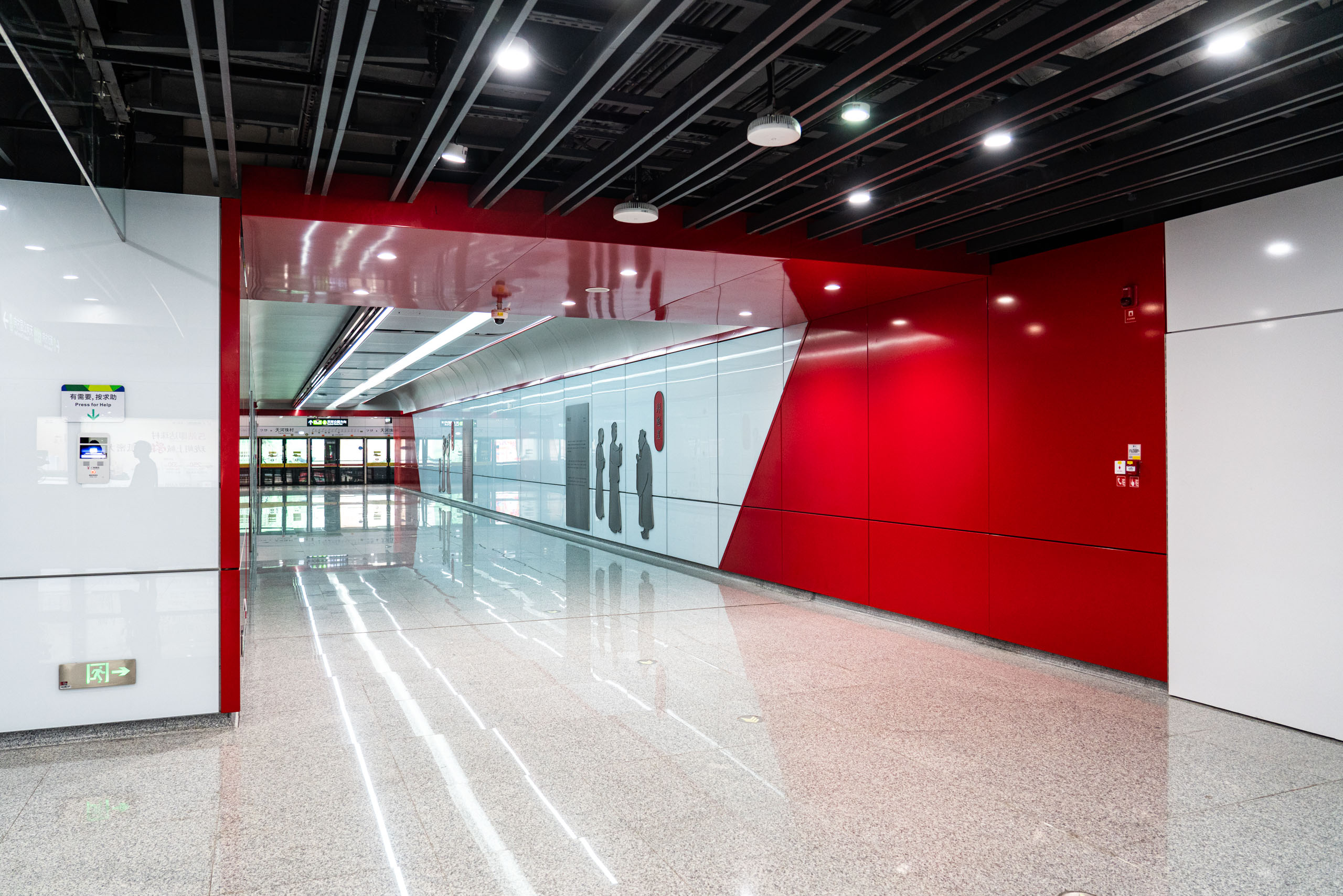
Connecting passage between the platforms

=== Entrances/exits ===
The station has 3 points of entry/exit. Exit C is equipped with an elevator.

- A: Zhongshan Avenue Middle, BRT Zhucun Station (Eastbound)
- B: Zhongshan Avenue Middle
- C: Zhongshan Avenue Middle, BRT Zhucun Station (Westbound)
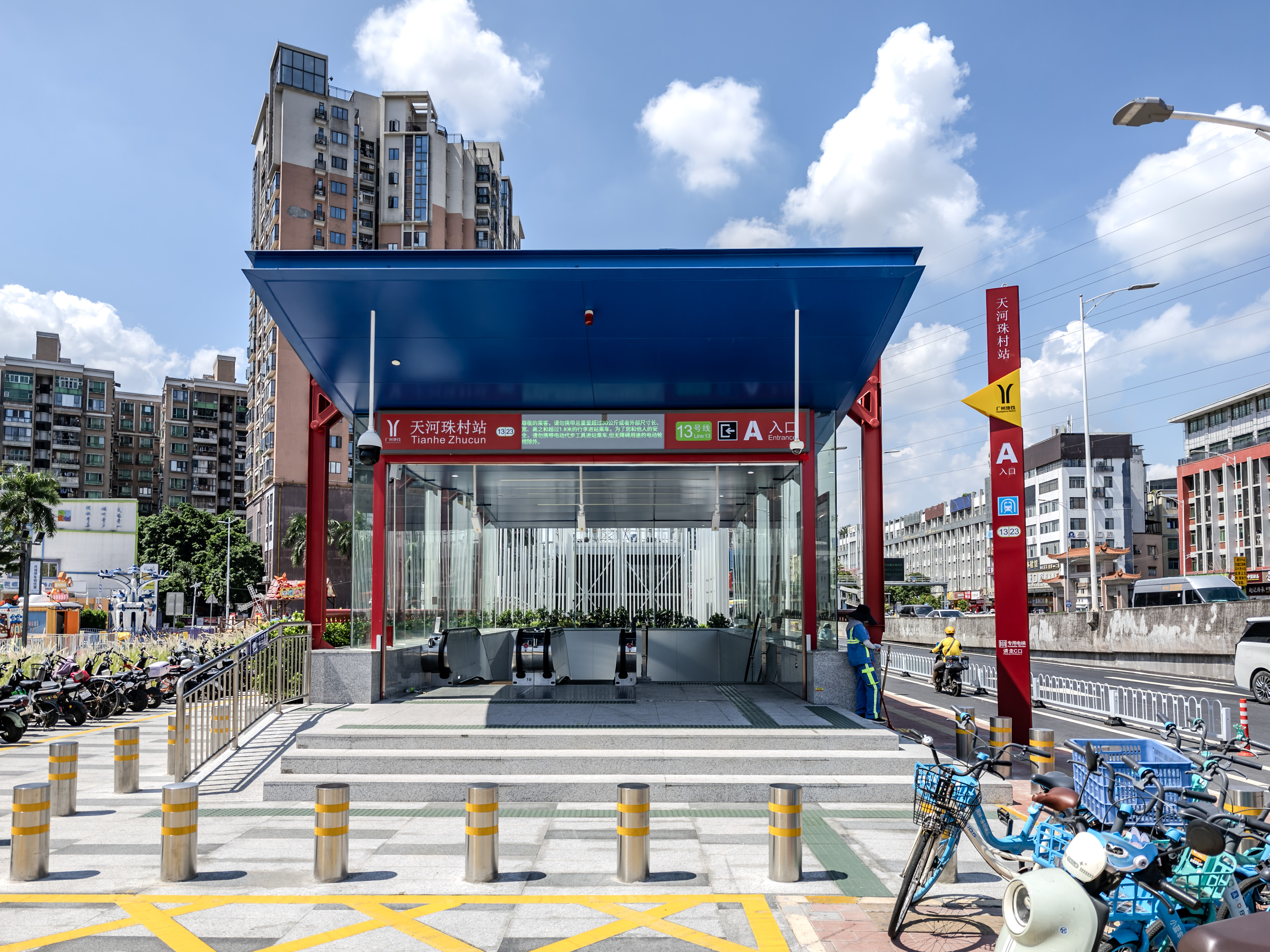
Entrance A

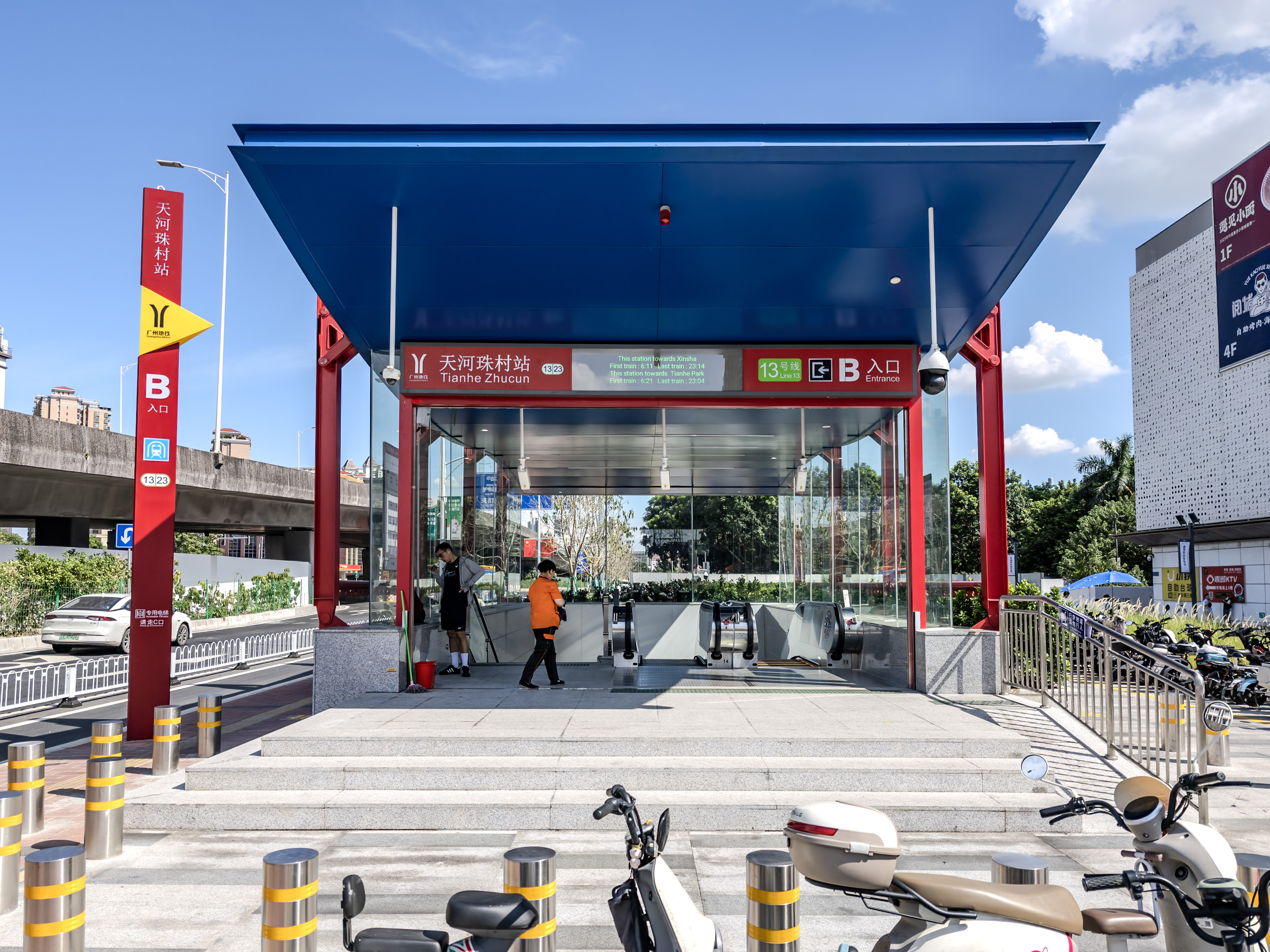
Entrance B

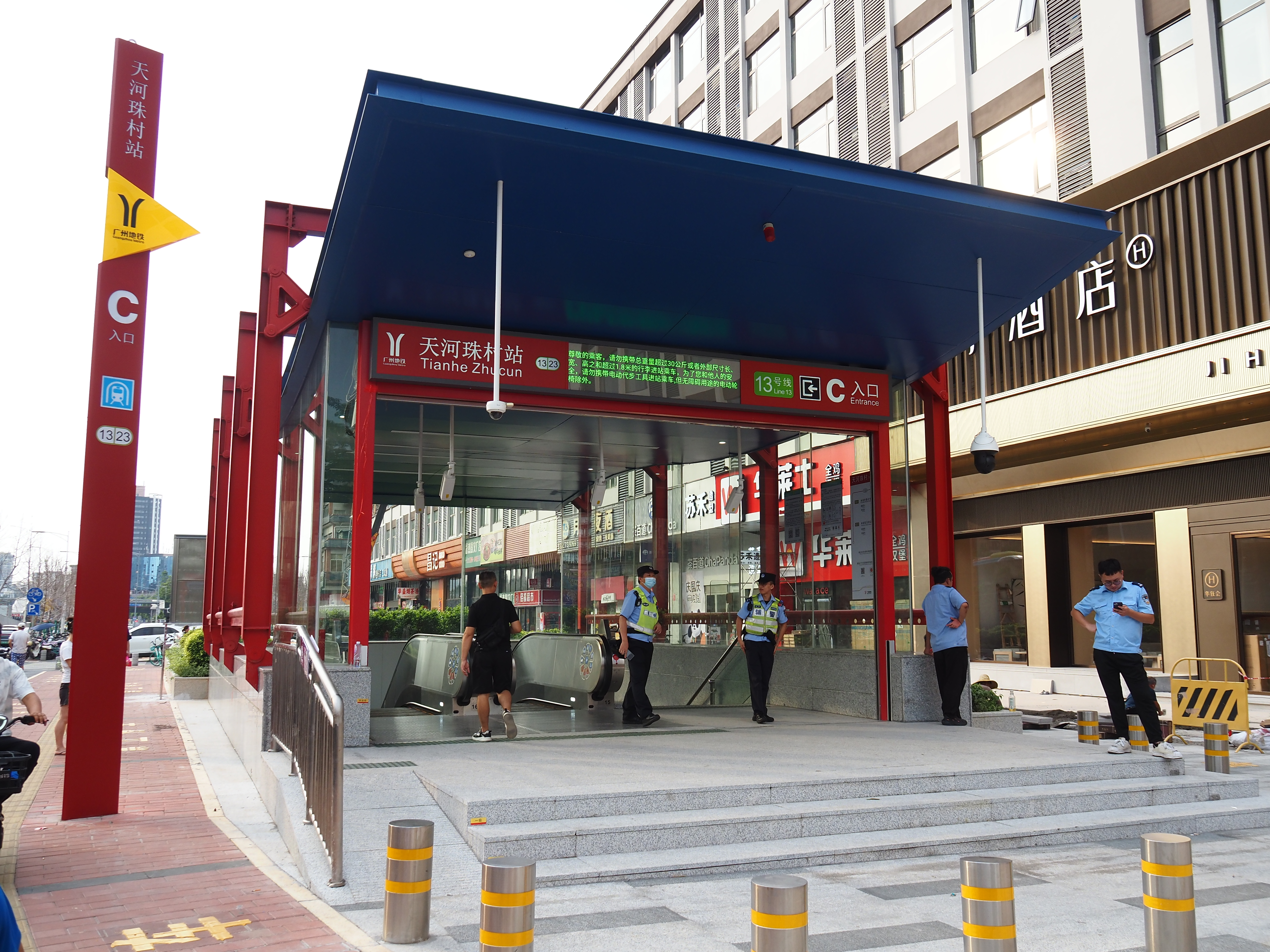
Entrance C

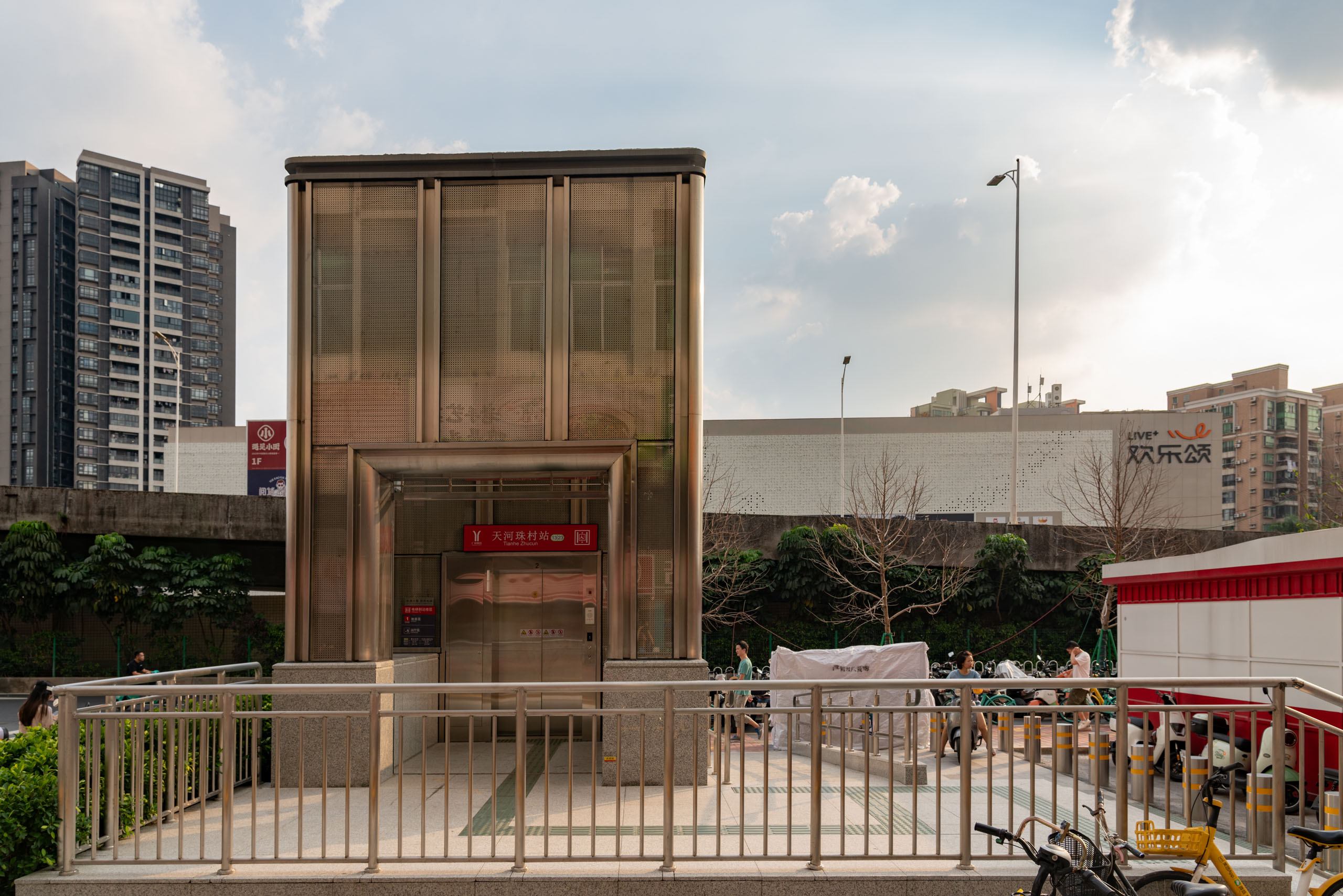
Elevator of Entrance C

== History ==
Because the station is close to Zhucun, it was named Zhu-cun station during planning and construction. In July 2025, the Guangzhou Municipal Transportation Bureau announced the preliminary station names for the first section of Line 13 Phase 2, and this station intends to maintain its current name. Since the Mandarin and Cantonese pronunciations of "Zhu-cun" are the same as those of Zhucun station on Line 21 (Note: Mandarin Pinyin: zhū cūn, Cantonese Jyutping: zyu^{1} cyun^{1}), it does not comply with the Guangzhou Metro Station Naming Conventions requirement of "not sharing the same name with other metro stations in the city or in the metro network interconnected with the city, and avoiding homophones, near-phonetics, and ambiguities". Some citizens suggested that the station be renamed Tianhe Zhucun similarly to Baiyun Dongping station. Eventually, in September 2025, it was officially renamed to Tianhe Zhucun station in accordance with the naming convention requirements.

To facilitate the construction of the station, the traffic management department has enclosing the auxiliary road of the Zhongshan Avenue Middle—Hulin Road viaduct from 22 January 2019. The main structure of the station has been capped in July 2021, and the underground tunnel has been built in March 2022. In July 2025, the station completed the "three rights" transfer. On 29 September 2025, the station opened.

== Accidents ==
At noon on 3 March 2021, a road subsidence occurred on the south side of the Zhongshan Avenue—Hulin Road overpass near the station construction site. No casualties were reported in the accident.
