= Tropical Storm Sanba (2023) =

Pacific tropical storm in 2023

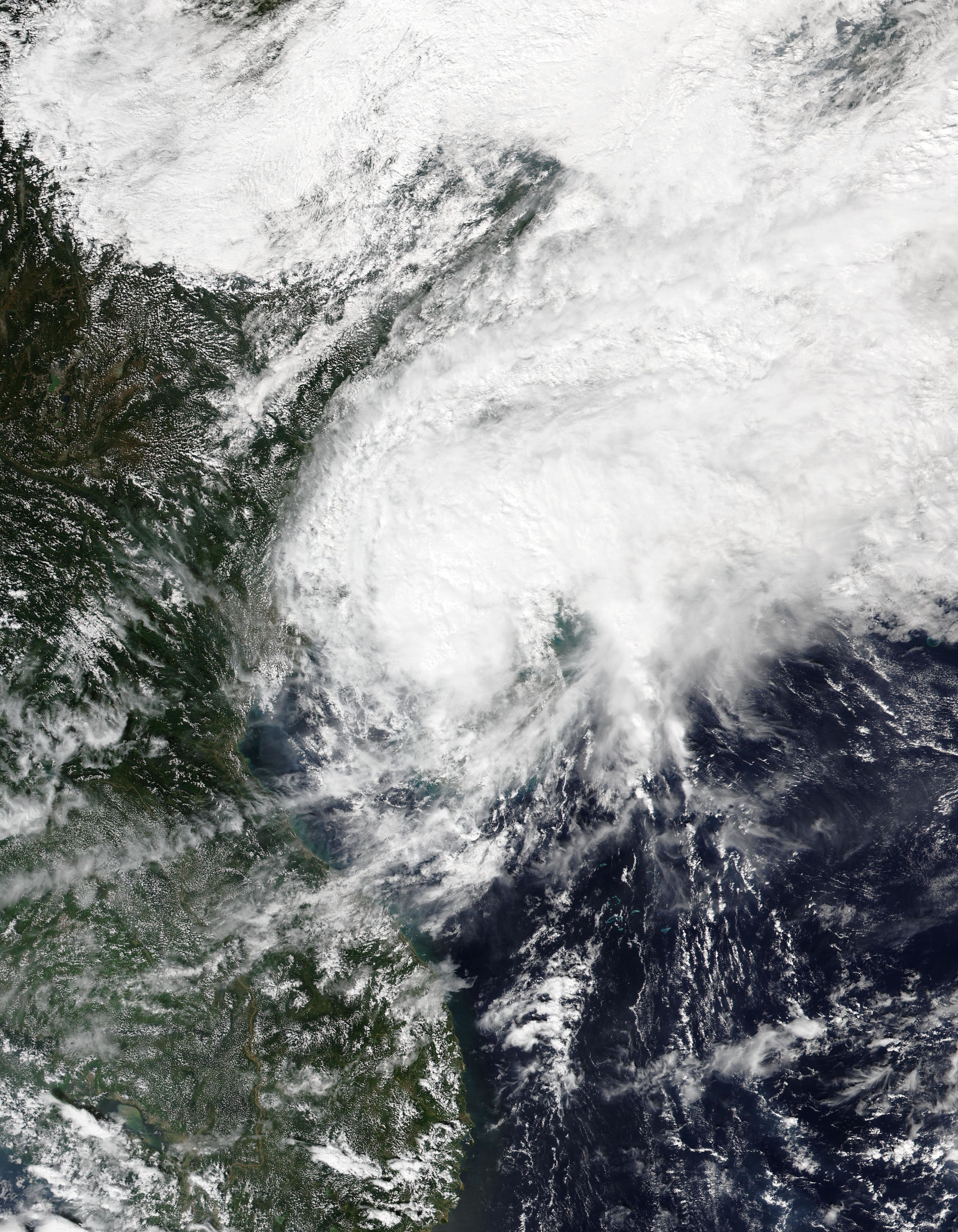
- Sanba near peak intensity over the Gulf of Tonkin on October 19

Meteorological history
- Formed: October 17, 2023
- Dissipated: October 20, 2023

Tropical storm
- 10-minute sustained (JMA)
- Highest winds: 75 km/h (45 mph)
- Lowest pressure: 1000 hPa (mbar); 29.53 inHg

Tropical storm
- 1-minute sustained (SSHWS/JTWC)
- Highest winds: 85 km/h (50 mph)
- Lowest pressure: 999 hPa (mbar); 29.50 inHg

Overall effects
- Fatalities: 7
- Missing: 12
- Damage: $818 million (2023 USD)
- Areas affected: Vietnam, South China
- IBTrACS
- Part of the 2023 Pacific typhoon season

Tropical Storm Sanba (Note: The name Sanba (Mandarin: 三巴, [sän˥ pä˥]) was contributed by Macau and refers to the Ruins of Saint Paul's in Mandarin.) was a weak but destructive tropical cyclone which brought heavy rains to Vietnam and South China in mid-October 2023. The sixteenth named storm of the annual typhoon season, the precursor of Sanba formed as a low-pressure area on October 13, west of the Philippines. The system moved north-northwest ward and gradually gaining strength due to favourable atmospheric condition. On October 17, the system intensified to a tropical depression, and became Tropical Storm Sanba the following day. Sanba later re-curved to the north-northeast, striking the western coast of Hainan. On October 20, Sanba decelerated and hit the western coast of the Leizhou Peninsula. The system weakened due to hostile environment and dissipated later that day.

The precursor of Sanba interacted with the Intertropical Convergence Zone (ITCZ), which brought heavy rains to Vietnam, sinking two fishing boats, killing three people and 12 other were missing. Due to its slow-paced movement, Sanba brought strong winds and heavy rains in Hainan and Liangguang region. The storm killed four people and caused a damage of nearly US$800 million in China.

== Meteorological history ==
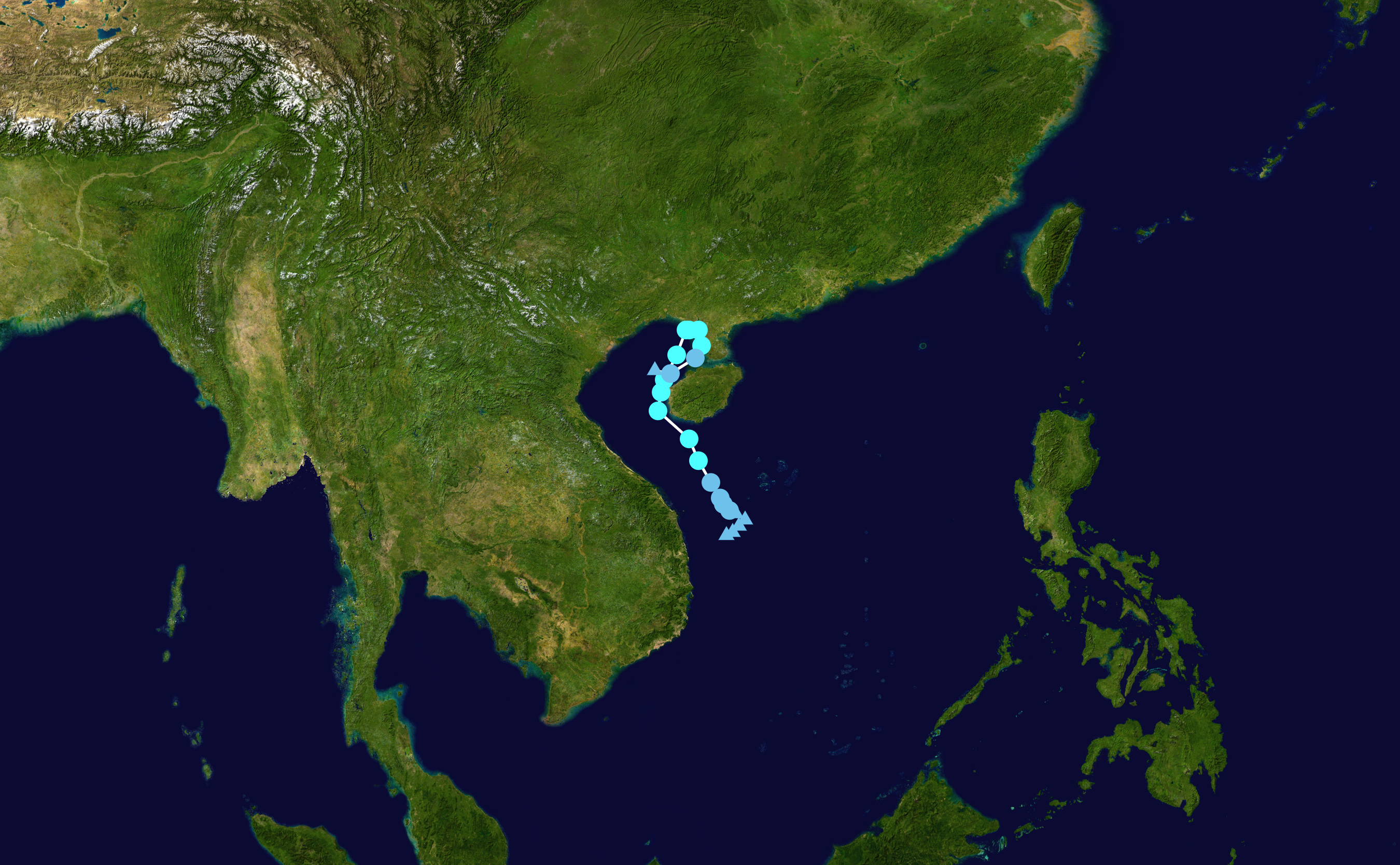
Map plotting the storm's track and intensity, according to the Saffir–Simpson scale Map key Saffir–Simpson scale Tropical depression (≤38 mph, ≤62 km/h) Tropical storm (39–73 mph, 63–118 km/h) Category 1 (74–95 mph, 119–153 km/h) Category 2 (96–110 mph, 154–177 km/h) Category 3 (111–129 mph, 178–208 km/h) Category 4 (130–156 mph, 209–251 km/h) Category 5 (≥157 mph, ≥252 km/h) Unknown Storm type Tropical cyclone Subtropical cyclone Extratropical cyclone, remnant low, tropical disturbance, or monsoon depression

On October 13, a low-pressure area formed in the South China Sea, west of the Philippines, in which the system interact with the Intertropical Convergence Zone (ITCZ). The Joint Typhoon Warning Center (JTWC) issued a Tropical Cyclone Formation Alert (TCFA) at 22:00 UTC for the low-pressure area, while the system located just off the coast of Central Vietnam, analyzing the system in a favorable environment such as high sea surface temperature of 28–29 °C (82–84 °F), extremely strong divergence, and moderate wind shear. Early on October 17, the Japan Meteorological Agency (JMA) said that the system had strengthened into a tropical depression. The JTWC followed suit later that day, and assigned the system the number 16W. Infrared satellite imagery depicts a central dense overcast (CDO) obscuring the circulation of a poorly organized depression. Early on October 18, the JMA upgraded the system to a tropical storm, and assigned the name Sanba, forecasting that the storm would move north in the next few days and entered the Gulf of Tonkin. The JTWC also upgraded the system strengthen to a tropical storm at the same time.

A ridge to the east brought deep-layer southward wind shear, and caused the upper and the mid-level clouds being displaced. Sanba made the first landfall in Dongfang, Hainan at 9 a.m. (local time, 01:00 UTC) on October 19. Afterwards, Sanba accelerated to the north-northeast and entered the Gulf of Tonkin. The storm benefited from favorable environmental conditions including high sea surface temperatures, displayed scattered high cloud tops in a radial direction. Later that day, Sanba attained its peak intensity with 10-minute sustained winds of 45 mph (75 km/h) and a barometric pressure of 1,000 hPa (29.53 inHg). At 9:45 a.m. (local time, 01:45 UTC) on October 20, Sanba made the second landfall in Zhanjiang, Guangdong. The system began to turn southward and gradually weakened because of unfavorable conditions such as land interaction, cold together with dry air, and strong wind shear. The JTWC soon downgraded the system to a tropical depression. At 7:40 p.m. (local time, 11:40 UTC), Sanba made the third and final landfall in Lingao County, Hainan. The JMA downgraded the system to a tropical depression shortly thereafter and stopped issuing advisories for the system. The depression continued to weaken, with the JMA declared that the depression dissipated later that day. The JTWC also issued its final warning bulletin on the same day.

== Preparations and impact ==
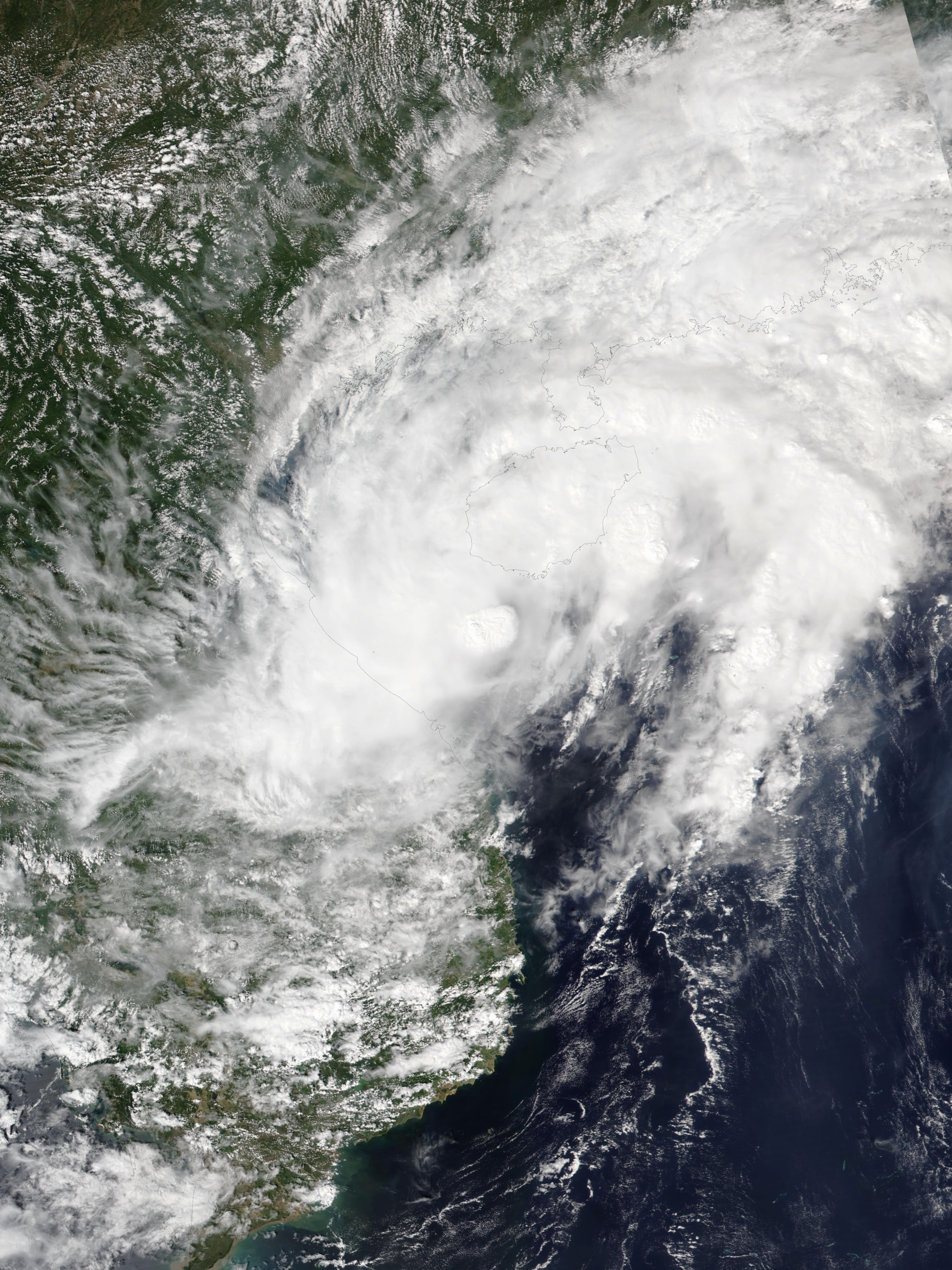
Tropical Storm Sanba just off the coast of Hainan on October 18

=== Vietnam ===
The precursor of Sanba interacted with the Intertropical Convergence Zone (ITCZ) and brought thunderstorms, tornadoes and strong waves in the South China Sea, sinking two Vietnamese fishing boats near the Spratly Islands. After two fishing boat sank, search and rescue forces were mobilized to search for victims of the two sinking boats. Searchers stopped looking for victims on October 23. Three people were killed and 12 others were missing in this incident. The interaction between Sanba and the ITCZ, along with cold air and easterly winds blowing in from the sea, caused heavy rain in Central Vietnam, with many places recording rainfall of 120–175 mm (4.7–6.9 in) in 8 hours. A level 4 disaster risk warning has been issued for Thừa Thiên Huế and Da Nang, the first time that Vietnam has issued a level 4 disaster risk warning due to heavy rain. After Sanba intensified to a tropical storm, the National Center for Hydro-Meteorological Forecasting (NCHMF) issued an "emergency storm bulletin" due to concerns that Sanba would cause notable impacts in Vietnam, though the warning was later cancelled as Sanba began to weaken and unlikely to bring significant impact to Vietnam. The impact of Sanba in northern Vietnam is relatively minor, only Bạch Long Vĩ Island recorded near gale-force winds. Total damage in Vietnam amounted to 549 billion đồng (US$22.4 million).

=== China ===
On October 18, Sanya issued a Level III emergency response warning for flood and wind prevention. Kindergartens and nurseries in the city were closed in the afternoon, sightseeing was also suspended. At 17:30 (local time, 09:30 UTC), the Hainan Provincial General Department of National Defense upgraded the flood prevention emergency response level from level IV to level III. Haikou New Port, Xiuying Port and South Port were closed from 4:00 a.m. (local time) on October 19. Many places on the island experienced strong winds, with the highest gust on Hainan Island reaching 52 mph (83 km/h) in Yazhou, Sanya, and the highest gust in the entire province reaching 70 mph (112 km/h) in Qizhou Liedao. Rainfall in the past 4 days on Hainan Island was generally between 100 and 300 mm (3.9 and 11.8 in), with the highest being 333.2 mm (13.12 in), recorded in Hele, Hainan.

On October 18, the Guangxi Flood Prevention and Drought Relief Department launched a level IV emergency response for flood and typhoon prevention and control. Some places recorded rainfall of 400–600 mm (16–24 in) and gale-force winds. The highest rainfall was 780.3 mm (30.72 in), recorded in Yinhai District, Beihai, which broke the record of highest rainfall in 24-hour timespan. An oil platform near Weizhou Island observed sustained winds of 64 mph (103 km/h) and a gust of 75 mph (120 km/h). Heavy rain flooded roads in many places, leaving many people stranded, and saver were mobilized to rescue trapped people. A motor vehicle in Bobai County, Yulin was stuck while crossing a bridge flooded with 30 cm (12 in) deep. 4 people in the car were rescued. A village in Bobai County was isolated, clean water and electricity were cut off. Rescue forces and necessary equipment arrived and provided necessities to more than 100 trapped households. More than 30 people stranded along the road in Luchuan County were also rescued. In addition, due to the effects of Sanba offshore, a Chinese cargo ship were trapped in the Gulf of Tonkin, west of Weizhou Island. The ship and 5 crew members were rescued.

In Guangdong, the flood control and emergency response alert level in Zhanjiang was raised to level II, and in Maoming it was raised to level III. Due to Sanba, many places in Zhanjiang and Maoming were affected by heavy rains, with an average rainfall of over 200 mm (7.9 in) in 24 hours, and a maximum rainfall of over 400 mm (16 in) in 24 hours. The highest one-hour rainfall in Maoming was 158.5 mm (6.24 in), recorded at a village in Maonan District, which broke the record in the city. Schools in Chikan, Xiashan, Mazhang, Potou, and other places in Zhanjiang were closed on October 19. Maoming has also asked schools and kindergartens in some areas to temporarily closed. Several roads in Zhanjiang were heavily flooded, leaving many elderly people and children trapped. Water levels exceeded the alarming levels in the upper course of Jian River and some other river sections. Gaozhou Reservoir discharged floodwaters because the water level at the reservoir exceeded the allowable limit. Overall, 4 people were killed and more than 2 million people were affected by the storm. More than 300 houses collapsed, 138,700 ha (343,000 acres) of crops were damaged, and the damage was calculated at 5.82 billion yuan (US$796 million).

Due to the combined effects of Sanba (including its precursor) and the northeast monsoon, Hong Kong and Macau experienced some rainfall and gusty winds.

== See also ==
- Weather of 2023
- Tropical cyclones in 2023
- Tropical Storm Mangkhut (2013)
- Tropical Storm Kujira (2015)
- Tropical Storm Wutip (2025) – had similar track.
