= Typhoon Mujigae =

Pacific typhoon in 2015

Typhoon Mujigae (Kabayan)
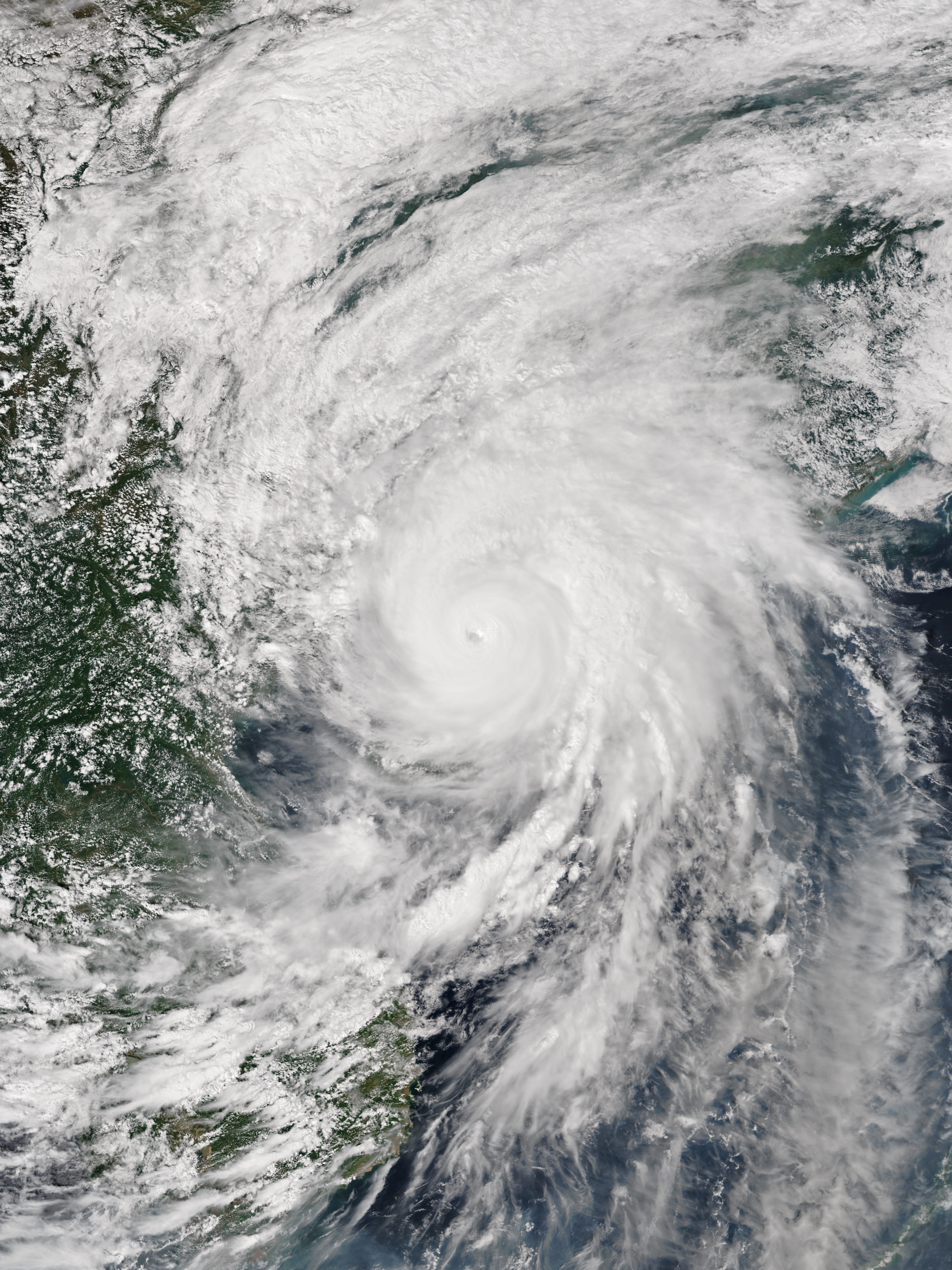
- Typhoon Mujigae weakening over the Leizhou Peninsula on October 4

Meteorological history
- Formed: September 30, 2015
- Dissipated: October 5, 2015

Very strong typhoon
- 10-minute sustained (JMA)
- Highest winds: 155 km/h (100 mph)
- Lowest pressure: 950 hPa (mbar); 28.05 inHg

Category 4-equivalent typhoon
- 1-minute sustained (SSHWS/JTWC)
- Highest winds: 215 km/h (130 mph)
- Lowest pressure: 937 hPa (mbar); 27.67 inHg

Overall effects
- Fatalities: ≥31
- Missing: 12
- Economic losses: $4.3 billion (2015 USD) (Note: Includes US$1.03 million of damage in the Philippines; further decimals are not shown to avoid false precision.)
- Areas affected: Philippines, South China, Vietnam, Cambodia, Laos, Thailand
- IBTrACS
- Part of the 2015 Pacific typhoon season

Typhoon Mujigae, known in the Philippines as Tropical Storm Kabayan, was the costliest typhoon to impact China in 2015. The typhoon first passed over the Philippines as a developing tropical cyclone from October 1 to 3, 2015. It then caused widespread damage in the Chinese provinces of Guangdong, Guangxi, and Hainan from October 3 to 6. Afterwards, as Mujigae weakened inland, it brought heavy rain to parts of Mainland Southeast Asia. Mujigae originated from an area of disturbed weather that formed just east of the Philippines on September 30. The disturbance slowly organized amid a favorable environment, becoming a tropical depression later that day. It traveled steadily west-northwestwards and made landfall in Central Luzon late on October 1, before crossing into the South China Sea the next morning. Mujigae strengthened rapidly on October 3, becoming a mature typhoon with 10-minute sustained winds of 155 km/h (100 mph), 1-minute sustained winds of 215 km/h (130 mph), and a minimum pressure of 950 hPa (28.05 inHg). The typhoon then made landfall over Zhanjiang, Guangdong, and weakened swiftly, dissipating inland over Guangxi on October 5.

As a developing system, Mujigae brought gusty winds, moderate rain, and rough seas to the island of Luzon in the Philippines. The adverse weather forced ports and schools to close, while numerous landslides and flash floods damaged roads, houses, and agricultural land. Large waves caused by the storm capsized several fishing boats, necessitating search-and-rescue operations by the Philippine Navy and Coast Guard. In total, Mujigae killed at least four in the Philippines, left 12 missing, and caused damage valued at ₱46.9 million (US$1.03 million). (Note: All currencies are in their 2015 values and are converted to United States dollars using data from the International Monetary Fund published by the World Bank.)

Mujigae's most severe impacts occurred in China, with the provinces of Guangdong, Guangxi, and Hainan being the worst hit. The typhoon affected 7.5 million people across the three provinces, causing 27 fatalities and economic losses of ¥27 billion (US$4.3 billion). The outer bands of the typhoon spawned destructive tornadoes in Guangzhou and Foshan that killed seven and left 223 injured. Infrastructural damage left by the tornadoes resulted in widespread disruptions to telecommunications, electricity, and water supplies. Elsewhere, fallen trees, landslides, and collapsing buildings accounted for most of the fatalities. In preparation for the storm, ships and offshore workers were recalled to port, flights were delayed or canceled, train services were suspended, and tourist attractions were shut. These disrupted tourism amid China's "Golden Week" holidays following their National Day. Hong Kong and Macau experienced gusty winds and heavy rain from October 3 to 5 as Mujigae passed to the south, but were left relatively unscathed. Immediate post-storm relief was provided by the National Disaster Reduction Center of China and the Ministry of Civil Affairs. The National Development and Reform Commission later issued more funds for reconstruction efforts in Guangdong and Guangxi.

Towards the end of Mujigae's lifespan, its outer rainbands brought heavy rains to parts of Vietnam, Cambodia, Laos, and Thailand, causing localized flash floods. Consequently, some homes and crops were damaged.

== Meteorological history ==
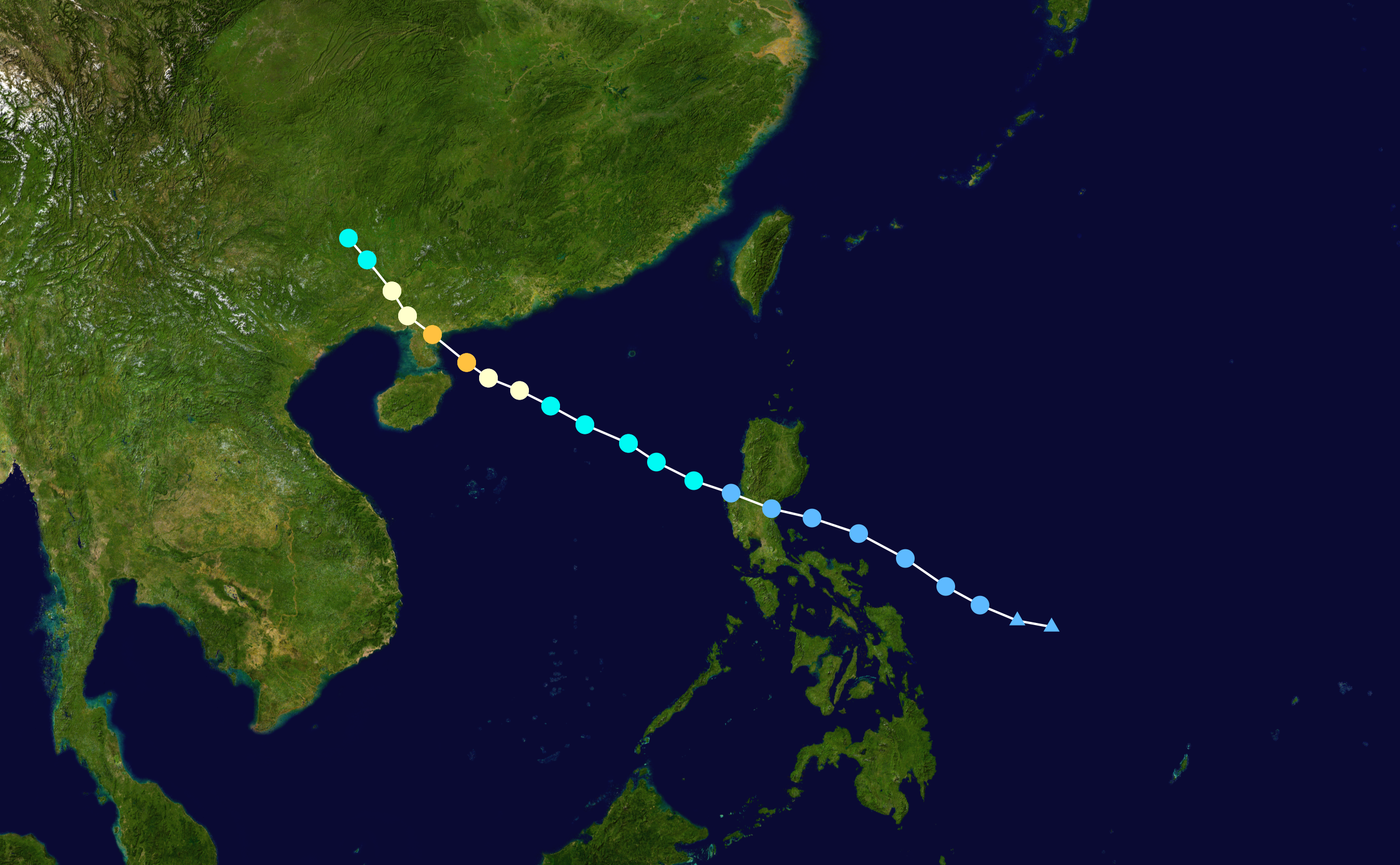
Map plotting the storm's track and intensity, according to the Saffir–Simpson scale (Note: The position of Mujigae's Category 4 peak is not depicted in this graphic as it is an asynoptic point (i.e. not at the 6-hour intervals of all other points) occurring at 03:00 UTC October 4.) Map key Saffir–Simpson scale Tropical depression (≤38 mph, ≤62 km/h) Tropical storm (39–73 mph, 63–118 km/h) Category 1 (74–95 mph, 119–153 km/h) Category 2 (96–110 mph, 154–177 km/h) Category 3 (111–129 mph, 178–208 km/h) Category 4 (130–156 mph, 209–251 km/h) Category 5 (≥157 mph, ≥252 km/h) Unknown Storm type Tropical cyclone Subtropical cyclone Extratropical cyclone, remnant low, tropical disturbance, or monsoon depression

At 00:00 UTC on September 30, a tropical disturbance developed near 11.9°N 130.3°E, about 600 km (370 mi) east of the Philippines. The Joint Typhoon Warning Center (JTWC) deemed the disturbance to have become a tropical depression at 12:00 UTC and gave it the identifier 22W. The Japan Meteorological Agency (JMA) also classified the system as a tropical depression at 18:00 UTC. (Note: The Japan Meteorological Agency is the official Regional Specialized Meteorological Center for the western Pacific Ocean.) The depression was lopsided at this time, with the bulk of thunderstorm activity to the west of the system's center. Amid low vertical wind shear and good outflow helping the growth of thunderstorms, the depression improved further in organization through October 1, as it moved west-northwestwards under the influence of a subtropical ridge to its north. The Philippine Atmospheric, Geophysical and Astronomical Services Administration named the system Kabayan at 02:00 UTC on October 1. The JMA upgraded the system to a tropical storm at 12:00 UTC as it began producing 10-minute sustained winds of 65 km/h (40 mph), (Note: Wind estimates from the JMA and most other basins throughout the world are sustained over 10 minutes, while estimates from the JTWC are sustained over 1 minute. On average, 1-minute winds are about 12% higher than 10-minute winds.) giving it the name Mujigae. (Note: The name Mujigae (Korean: 무지개, [mud͡ʑiɡɛ]) was contributed by North Korea and means rainbow in Korean.) The JTWC, however, continued to classify the system as a tropical depression as it approached the Philippines. No further intensification occurred on October 1 as Mujigae's circulation interacted with the Sierra Madre mountain range. Mujigae made landfall between Baler and San Luis in Aurora Province, Central Luzon, at roughly 20:00 UTC, and quickly crossed the island of Luzon, entering the South China Sea by 02:00 UTC on October 2.

Once over water, Mujigae soon resumed intensifying, taking advantage of 28–29 °C (82–84 °F) sea surface temperatures and strong outflow despite slightly elevated wind shear. The JTWC finally assessed Mujigae to be a tropical storm at 06:00 UTC on October 2; the JMA upgraded Mujigae further to severe tropical storm status six hours later. A nascent eye feature became visible on microwave satellite imagery, while associated thunderstorms grew more intense and wrapped more tightly into the system's circulation. Meanwhile, Mujigae continued tracking steadily west-northwest and exited the Philippine Area of Responsibility late on October 2. A 30-hour period of rapid intensification began at 00:00 UTC on October 3, aided greatly by the anomalously warm waters of the South China Sea, which even exceeded 30 °C (86 °F) around Hainan. Monthly mean sea surface temperatures in the area were the warmest since 1990, giving Mujigae ample energy to draw upon for strengthening in spite of moderate easterly wind shear. During this strengthening phase, the China Meteorological Administration's Shanghai Typhoon Institute launched four rocket-carried dropsondes into Mujigae from Wanning, Hainan, in a successful attempt to analyse the typhoon's interior structure. The JMA estimated that Mujigae's winds increased from 100 to 155 km/h (65 to 100 mph) and the central pressure dropped from 985 hPa (29.09 inHg) to 950 hPa (28.05 inHg) from 00:00 UTC October 3 to 00:00 UTC October 4, after which it peaked in intensity. The JTWC assessed that Mujigae continued to strengthen for a further three hours and attained peak 1-minute sustained winds of 215 km/h (130 mph), the equivalent of a Category 4 hurricane on the Saffir–Simpson scale. At its peak, Mujigae possessed a sharply defined eye just 24 km (15 mi) wide, centered in a symmetric central dense overcast. Shortly after, Mujigae made landfall in Potou District, Zhanjiang, Guangdong province, at 06:10 UTC on October 4. Rapid weakening commenced as the center of circulation moved over land, staying north of the Gulf of Tonkin. Mujigae weakened to a tropical storm by 18:00 UTC on October 4 and the JMA ceased monitoring the system as a tropical depression at 00:00 UTC on October 5. The JTWC continued tracking Mujigae while it moved inland over Guangxi province and last noted it as a dissipating tropical storm at 06:00 UTC on October 5.

== Impact ==
=== Philippines ===
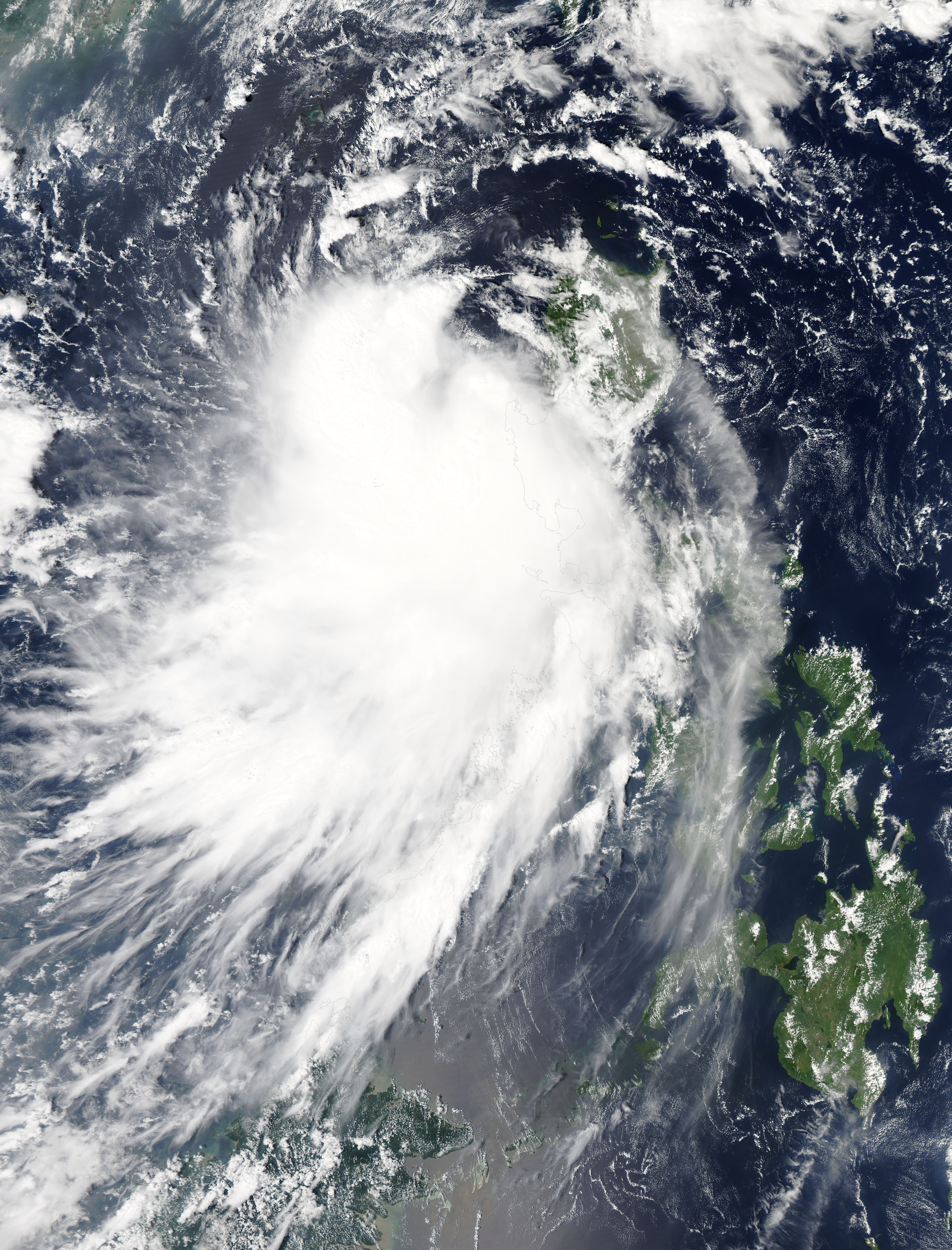
Tropical Storm Mujigae over the Philippines on October 2

Mujigae (known locally as Tropical Storm Kabayan) passed over Luzon from October 1 to 3, bringing moderate rain and winds gusting up to 120 km/h (75 mph). Public Storm Warning Signal No. 1 was raised in the provinces of Catanduanes, Camarines Sur, Camarines Norte, Aurora, and Northern Quezon on October 1, and further extended to Benguet, Tarlac, Ilocos Sur, and Zambales on October 2. Public Storm Warning Signal No. 2—the highest warning level issued for Mujigae—was raised in La Union and Pangasinan on October 2. All warnings were lifted by the evening of October 2 as Mujigae began to move away from the Philippines.

The tropical storm affected roughly 59,600 people during its passage over the Philippines. A peak 24-hour rainfall total of 134.0 mm (5.28 in) occurred in Iba, Zambales. In Central Luzon, a total of 703 houses were damaged, of which 97 were destroyed. A landslide in Gabaldon, Nueva Ecija required the evacuation of 30 families, while another landslide in Buenavista, Marinduque damaged a wall. Several incidents of flash flooding were reported, with 50 barangays (village-level administrative districts) inundated with up to 0.9 m (3 ft) of water. A person in Maria Aurora municipality drowned in a flash flood, while another from Bongabon municipality was killed by a snake bite. The body of a fisherman was found in Agno municipality on October 3, two days after he went fishing out at sea and was reported missing. In total, roughly 6,480 people evacuated to seven shelters. Classes were suspended across much of Luzon on October 2. Ports were closed in the Bicol Region and Southern Tagalog on October 2 and 3 because of rough seas, leaving up to 212 passengers and 53 rolling cargoes stranded. Twelve roads and two bridges were blocked by flooding and mudslides. Power outages occurred on October 2 and 3 in parts of Aurora, Benguet, and Pangasinan, including in Baguio, though services were quickly restored. Damage to agriculture and infrastructure in Ilocos and Central Luzon was valued at ₱46.9 million (US$1.03 million), mostly from the provinces of Aurora, Pampanga, and Pangasinan. Following the storm, local government units and the Department of Social Welfare and Development gave ₱2.37 million (US$52,100) worth of disaster relief to Aurora, Bulacan, and Nueva Ecija provinces.

Numerous incidents occurred at sea as fishermen continued operations despite being advised against doing so by government agencies and the Philippine Coast Guard. Several fishing boats were capsized by large waves, leaving fishermen adrift in the water for up to four days before they were picked up by other boats or were swept back to shore. As many as 121 fishermen were missing on the night of October 3. The Philippine Navy activated two Islander aircraft and several ships to conduct search and rescue operations, in conjunction with vessels from the Coast Guard. They were largely successful in locating the missing fishermen, with the number of missing decreasing to 56 by October 5. A "partial and unofficial report" from the Coast Guard on October 6 stated that three fishermen had been confirmed dead; a body of another fisherman was recovered from the waters off Pangasinan on October 7. The searches were called off between October 7 and 10, leaving 12 still missing.

=== Mainland China ===
Typhoon Mujigae brought severe impacts to the provinces of Guangdong, Guangxi, and Hainan from October 3 to 6, affecting over 7.5 million people and killing 27. With economic losses estimated at ¥27 billion (US$4.3 billion), Mujigae was the costliest typhoon to impact China in 2015. At landfall in Zhanjiang, Guangdong, the China Meteorological Administration estimated Mujigae to have winds of 180 km/h (110 mph) and a central pressure of 940 hPa (27.76 inHg), making Mujigae the strongest typhoon to make landfall in China in the month of October since 1949. The three provinces experienced strong winds of at least 76 km/h (47 mph), with a peak gust of 242 km/h (150 mph) recorded in Zhanjiang. Torrential rain fell over the region throughout the four days, leading to rainfall accumulations of 100–500 mm (3.9–19.7 in). The outer rainbands of Mujigae also produced tornadoes in parts of Guangdong on October 4. Power outages occurred in much of the region and transport lines were cut. Mujigae came ashore during a week-long holiday (known as a "Golden Week") following China's National Day, disrupting the plans of many tourists seeking to travel to the southern coast. Mujigae's track and rapid intensification prior to landfall drew comparisons to Typhoon Rammasun, which had significantly impacted similar areas a year earlier.

==== Guangdong ====
Ahead of the storm, the China Meteorological Administration issued red alerts for the province, expecting wind gusts exceeding 200 km/h (120 mph) and rainfall accumulations of 250–280 mm (9.8–11.0 in). The Qiongzhou Strait was closed to marine traffic on the evening of October 2, and nearly 40,000 fishing boats west of Shanwei returned to port to shelter in Guangdong. Coastal tourist attractions in the province were closed from October 3. The suspension of ferry services to offshore islands left 503 tourists on Fangji Island stranded; strong winds hampered attempts to return them to the mainland. The National Marine Environmental Forecasting Center issued warnings for storm surge and large waves that same day. Flights out of Zhuhai and Zhanjiang were canceled. China Southern Power Grid readied 24,000 workers to address any power disruptions. Authorities evacuated 170,400 people in vulnerable areas.

Typhoon Mujigae rapidly intensifying prior to landfall in Zhanjiang on October 4

Mujigae made landfall in Potou District, Zhanjiang, on the afternoon of October 4. The typhoon brought high winds and heavy rain to over 3.53 million people in Guangdong, and spawned at least three tornadoes in the province. One tornado touched down in Guangzhou's Panyu District, killing three and injuring 134. The tornado damaged several houses and factories, blew down trees, and damaged power cables. Large parts of Panyu and Haizhu Districts thus lost power for the first time in 23 years. Tourists visiting the Canton Tower in Haizhu had to be evacuated after it suffered a blackout. The power outages had a further knock-on effect on communications and water infrastructure, resulting in greater disruption. Another tornado touched down in Shunde District, Foshan, causing four deaths and 89 injuries, while inflicting roughly ¥180 million (US$29 million) of damage. The tornado touched down for 32 minutes and traveled 30.85 km (19.17 mi) northwest, leaving a damage swath of diameter between 20 and 570 m (22 and 623 yd). It was also noted to have possessed twin funnels at peak intensity. The Foshan tornado was rated EF3 on the Enhanced Fujita scale, based on observations of collapsed tower cranes and destroyed factories and warehouses. A third tornado—this time a waterspout—occurred near the coast of Shanwei. For context, tornadoes in China are rather uncommon: on average less than 100 occur in a year, and in the 50 years prior to 2015, only 20 were at or above EF3 intensity. Hence, when Mujigae struck China in 2015, the country had no tornado forecasting or warning systems, likely contributing to an elevated number of fatalities and more extensive damage.

Damage was most severe in Zhanjiang, the site of Mujigae's landfall. The city experienced widespread blackouts and disruptions to water supplies and telecommunications, which hampered damage assessments. The waters of Zhanjiang Bay experienced an atypical period of elevated biodegradation of organic matter, following increased surface runoff entering the bay; this usually causes algal blooms instead. The storm sank two fishing boats docked in the city's port, drowning three and leaving four missing. A collapsed building in Xiashan District killed another. Elsewhere, landslides killed a total of seven people: four in Xinyi, Maoming, two in Luoding, Yunfu, and one in Guangning County, Zhaoqing. Overall, in Guangdong, Mujigae killed at least 18 people and left four missing. The typhoon damaged 3,374 houses and 282,700 hectares (699,000 acres) of crops across the province. Direct economic losses reached ¥23.24 billion (US$3.730 billion).

==== Guangxi ====
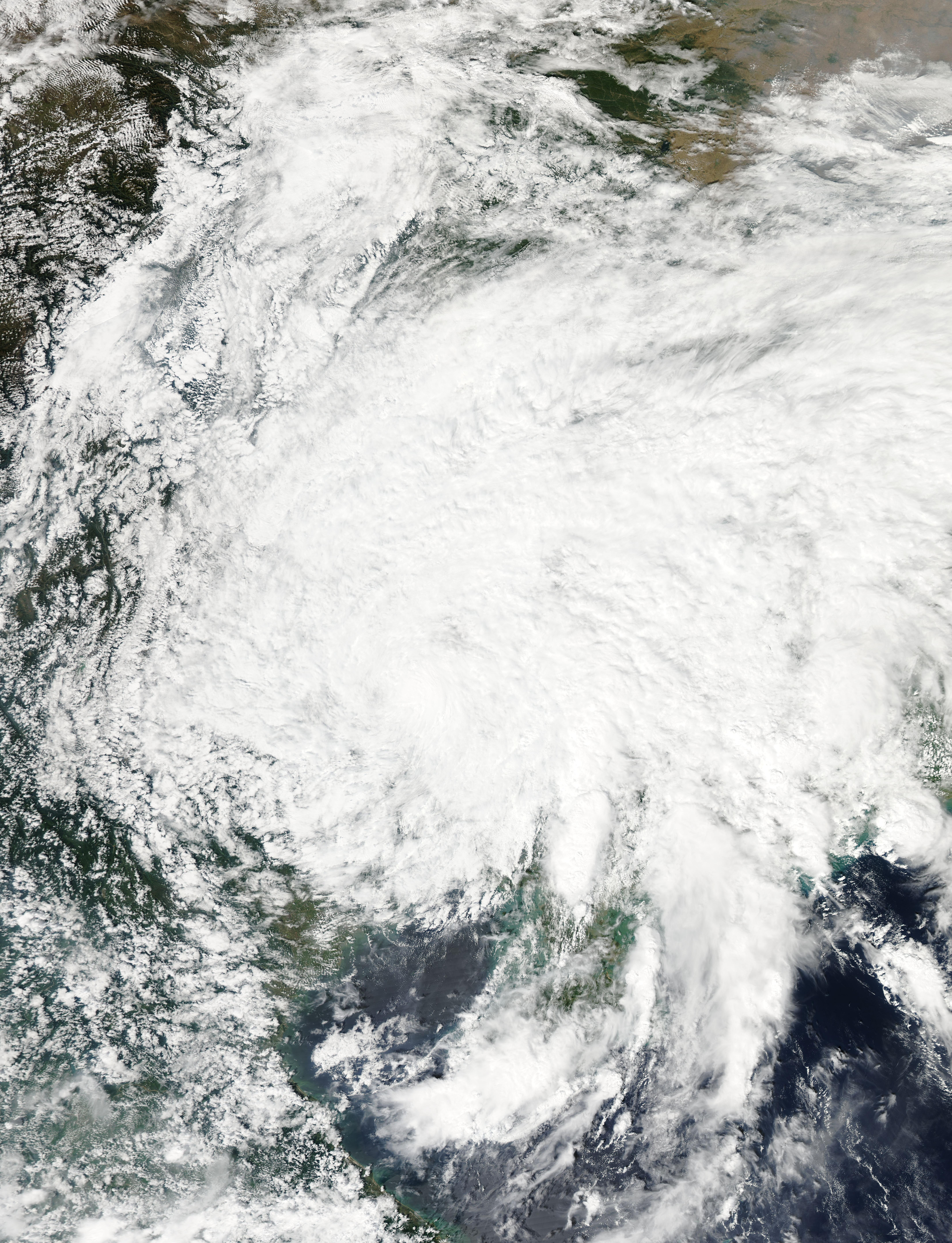
A dissipating Tropical Depression Mujigae over Guangxi on October 5

As Mujigae was expected to pass over eastern Guangxi, warnings for heavy rain and gusty winds were issued, and an increased possibility of landslides was noted. About 12,700 fishing boats in the region's waters were called back to port and 35,400 offshore workers were evacuated. Nineteen flights from Beihai Fucheng Airport were canceled as adverse weather conditions forced the airport to close on October 4. Meanwhile, 530 passengers were stranded at Nanning Wuxu International Airport as two flights were delayed by more than five hours and two others were scrapped. Services along the Guangxi coastal high-speed railway between Nanning and Beihai were halted from noon on October 4 to midnight on October 5. Scenic attractions were closed beginning October 4 and tourists evacuated. About 135,100 people living in vulnerable areas were moved to safety.

The center of Mujigae crossed into Guangxi from Guangdong on the evening of October 4, though heavy rains and gusty winds persisted in Guangxi through October 4 and 5. The typhoon affected 2.67 million people in the province. The strongest winds were recorded in Bobai County, where winds gusted up to 119 km/h (74 mph), and a peak rainfall total of 418.6 mm (16.48 in) was observed at Shengtang Mountain in Jinxiu Yao Autonomous County. Numerous flash floods and landslides occurred in the mountains of southeast Guangxi, damaging roads and buildings. A person was crushed and killed by a fallen tree in Nanning; the typhoon killed a total of two people in the province. Damage to power lines caused 1.155 million residents of Guangxi to lose power on October 5. The typhoon completely destroyed 954 houses, severely damaged another 1,532 houses, and left 5,478 more with mild damage. About 144,800 hectares (358,000 acres) of cropland was affected by rain and wind, of which 6,650 hectares (16,400 acres) were deemed a complete loss. Direct economic losses were at least ¥919 million (US$148 million), of which ¥752 million (US$121 million) was from agriculture and ¥46.8 million (US$7.52 million) was from property damage.

==== Hainan ====
Ahead of the storm, train services between the island and the mainland were suspended from October 2 to 5, while services on the Hainan eastern ring high-speed railway were halted on October 4. The Qiongzhou Strait was closed to marine traffic and ferry services across the strait were suspended. All 25,584 fishing boats in Hainan were ordered back to port to take shelter. Seventy-six flights from Haikou Meilan International Airport were delayed and eight canceled. Expressways remained open to vehicular traffic, however. Residents in flood-prone areas, such as Beigang Island, were evacuated to higher ground. By the evening of October 3, a total of 39,103 people in Wenchang had been resettled in 57 shelters, while 9,887 people had been evacuated in Qionghai. Hainan Power Grid placed 272 teams (with a total of 4,559 workers) and equipment worth ¥160 million (US$26 million) on standby to deal with disruptions to electrical services. Marine tourist attractions in Sanya, such as Wuzhizhou Island and parts of Yalong Bay, were shut beginning October 3, and all tourist attractions in Wenchang were closed from that evening.

Mujigae produced wind gusts from 104 to 165 km/h (64 to 102 mph) over the northern and western coasts of Hainan. Roughly 50–90 mm (2.0–3.5 in) of rain fell over the island from October 3 to 4. The typhoon affected 489,000 people in Hainan and caused economic losses of over ¥136 million (US$21.8 million), though no deaths were reported. About 171,000 acres (69,000 hectares) of cropland were damaged, contributing to over half of the province's damage bill. The remaining losses came from transport and industry as well as damage to water conservancy facilities. Power supplies remained relatively stable: about 47,000 customers lost power, and services were restored to 41,000 of them by the end of October 4. Flooding occurred along several streets in Haikou, however, storm surge did not enter the city and traffic was mostly unaffected. Reopening began on October 4 as the typhoon passed, with closures imposed on Sanya's tourist attractions lifted on the evening of October 4. Flights from Haikou Meilan International Airport resumed on the afternoon of October 4. All train services resumed on the morning of October 5.

==== Hong Kong and Macau ====
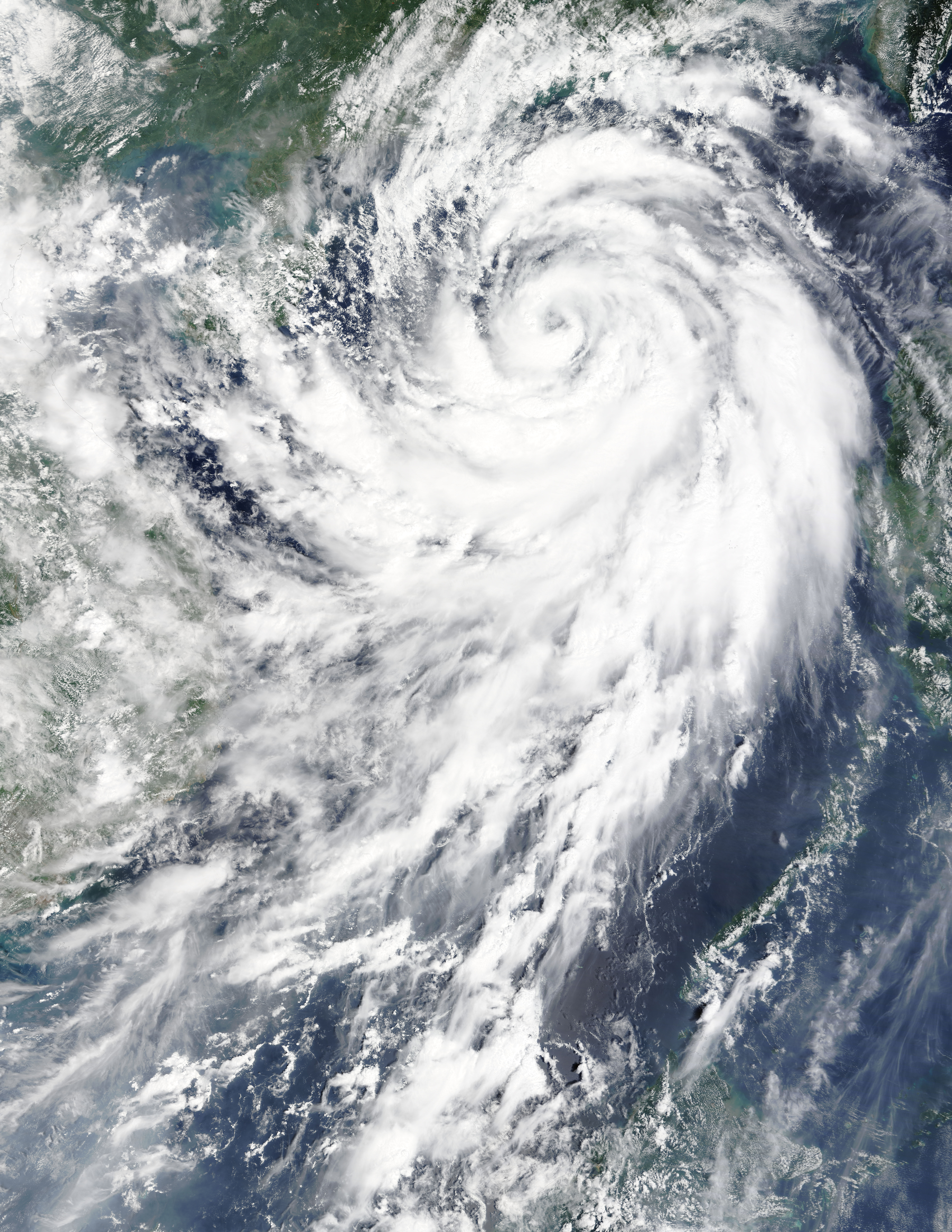
Typhoon Mujigae intensifying south of Hong Kong and Macau on October 3

The influence of Mujigae and a high-pressure area to the north brought squalls and rain to Hong Kong from October 3 to 5 as Mujigae passed to the south of the territory. Strong Wind Signal No. 3 was issued from October 3 to 4, and Amber Rainstorm Warning Signals were raised twice on the two days. Rainfall totals from October 2 to 5 ranged around 150 mm (5.9 in), reaching up to 250 mm (9.8 in) over the southwestern part of Lantau Island. The weather conditions caused 39 aircraft to be diverted from Hong Kong International Airport, and disrupted ferry services to and from Macau. At least 30 incidents of fallen trees and 14 incidents of flooding were recorded, with a fallen tree near Fanling station halting train services by damaging overhead cables. A runner participating in a race between Lantau and Sunset Peaks suffered a broken arm when he slipped off the track amid the adverse weather conditions. The final round of the Asia-Pacific Amateur Championship ended prematurely due to thunderstorms on the morning of October 4.

Nearby Macau experienced a similar situation from October 3 to 5. Typhoon Signal No. 3 was raised from the evening of October 3 to the morning on October 5 as heavy rains and gusty winds buffeted the territory. Some flooding occurred in low-lying regions. The Fire Services Bureau received 27 reports of fallen trees; in total they responded to 59 typhoon-related incidents. Thunderstorms forced the cancellation of six outdoor events and delayed at least 15 flights from Macau International Airport. Ferry operator TurboJET suspended services from Macau to Shenzhen and Hong Kong. A woman at the University of Macau suffered cuts on her limbs from broken glass and was sent to hospital. The adverse weather caused Macau's tourist visitation numbers to drop by 16 percent in the week following the typhoon, erasing gains from China's Golden Week holidays.

=== Southeast Asia ===
As Mujigae weakened inland over China, it brought torrential rain to parts of Vietnam, Thailand, Cambodia, and Laos. The combination of Mujigae and a cold front brought up to 100 mm (3.9 in) of rain to mountainous regions in the Vietnamese provinces of Quảng Ninh, Lạng Sơn, and Cao Bằng. Meanwhile, heavy rains in Northeast and Central Thailand had the beneficial effect of filling reservoirs, but caused several flash floods on October 4 and 5. One such flood in Nakhon Sawan Province ruined 2,000 rai (320 hectares; 790 acres) of cropland, while another in Chachoengsao Province inundated 40 houses, causing damage to agricultural equipment and electrical appliances. In Ratchaburi Province, a crocodile farm was flooded, and some of the crocodiles escaped. Other provinces affected by flash floods included Chanthaburi and Kamphaeng Phet.

== Aftermath ==
Following Mujigae's landfall in Guangdong, the National Disaster Reduction Center of China and the Ministry of Civil Affairs launched a Level IV emergency response in Guangdong and Guangxi. Guangdong's local government allocated ¥20 million (US$3.2 million) of funds to immediate disaster relief, and distributed ¥900,000 (US$140,000) worth of relief supplies in Yanjiang and Maoming by October 5. The next day, Guangdong authorities moved 300 tents, 300 folding beds, 2,100 quilts, 4,100 towels, 3,500 sets of clothing, and 250 emergency lights to affected cities. Guangxi's local government invested ¥18 million (US$2.9 million) into disaster relief by October 5, with plans to set aside a further ¥29 million (US$4.7 million). Around 24,800 workers from China Southern Power Grid were dispatched to restore electrical services, and by the morning of October 6 about 78 percent of households had their power restored. Outages in Hainan and Guangxi were fully resolved on October 5 and 7, respectively.

On October 27, the Chinese government announced that ¥300 million (US$48 million) of funds would be set aside for disaster relief efforts in Guangdong and Guangxi in addition to drought-stricken North China. This would cover reconstruction efforts and living expenses for those affected by Mujigae in the two provinces. A further contribution of ¥103 million (US$16.5 million) was announced by the National Development and Reform Commission on November 5.

=== Retirement ===
At the 48th Session of the ESCAP/WMO Typhoon Committee held from February 22 to 25, 2016, the name Mujigae was retired following a request by China due to the high damage and death toll caused by the storm. In 2017, the name Surigae was chosen as a replacement.

== See also ==
- Weather of 2015
- Tropical cyclones in 2015
- List of tornadoes spawned by tropical cyclones
- List of Philippine typhoons (2000–present)
