= Lianjiang, Guangdong =

Lianjiang 廉江市 Limkong; Lienchiang
- County-level city
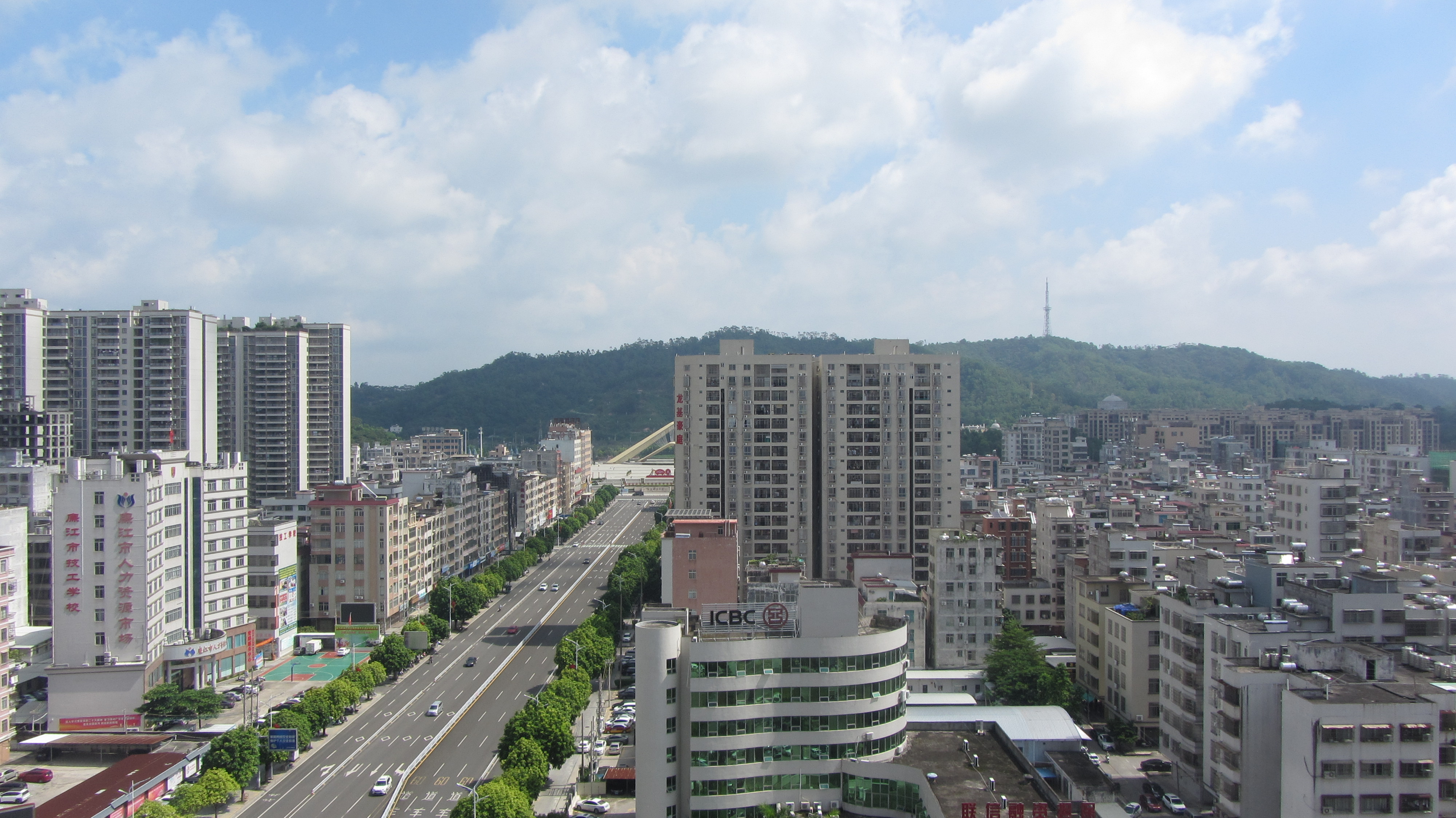

- Location in Guangdong
- Coordinates: 21°44′N 110°17′E
- Country: People's Republic of China
- Province: Guangdong
- Prefecture-level city: Zhanjiang

Area
  - Total: 2,835 km^{2} (1,095 sq mi)

Population (2020 census)
  - Total: 1,363,470
  - Density: 480.9/km^{2} (1,246/sq mi)
- Time zone: UTC+8 (China Standard)

Lianjiang (postal: Limkong; Chinese: 廉江) is a county-level city in the municipal region of Zhanjiang, Guangdong, China. The city has an area of 2,543 square kilometers, and had a population of about 1,363,470 as of 2020.

== Geography ==
Lianjiang lies in the north of the Leizhou Peninsula and faces Beibu Gulf to the southwest. The city is bordered to the east by Maoming; to the south by Wuchuan, Potou District, and Suixi County, all in Zhanjiang; to the west by Anpugang Harbour (Chinese: 安铺港, part of the Gulf of Tonkin) and Beihai, in Guangxi Province; and to the north by Yulin. Lianjiang lies 48 kilometers north of Zhanjiang's city center.

=== Climate ===
Climate data for Lianjiang, elevation 29 m (95 ft), (1991–2020 normals, extremes 1955–present)
Month	Jan	Feb	Mar	Apr	May	Jun	Jul	Aug	Sep	Oct	Nov	Dec	Year
Record high °C (°F)	29.1 (84.4)	31.7 (89.1)	34.7 (94.5)	36.4 (97.5)	36.9 (98.4)	36.7 (98.1)	38.0 (100.4)	37.5 (99.5)	36.4 (97.5)	35.5 (95.9)	34.2 (93.6)	30.8 (87.4)	38.0 (100.4)
Mean daily maximum °C (°F)	19.7 (67.5)	21.5 (70.7)	24.2 (75.6)	27.3 (81.1)	31.2 (88.2)	32.7 (90.9)	33.1 (91.6)	32.8 (91.0)	32.3 (90.1)	29.8 (85.6)	26.4 (79.5)	21.8 (71.2)	27.7 (81.9)
Daily mean °C (°F)	15.2 (59.4)	17.3 (63.1)	20.3 (68.5)	23.5 (74.3)	26.8 (80.2)	28.3 (82.9)	28.6 (83.5)	28.3 (82.9)	27.7 (81.9)	25.0 (77.0)	21.5 (70.7)	17.0 (62.6)	23.3 (73.9)
Mean daily minimum °C (°F)	12.2 (54.0)	14.6 (58.3)	17.8 (64.0)	21.1 (70.0)	24.1 (75.4)	25.5 (77.9)	25.8 (78.4)	25.5 (77.9)	24.7 (76.5)	21.8 (71.2)	18.1 (64.6)	13.7 (56.7)	20.4 (68.7)
Record low °C (°F)	−2.2 (28.0)	3.0 (37.4)	4.7 (40.5)	10.1 (50.2)	16.0 (60.8)	19.3 (66.7)	22.5 (72.5)	20.5 (68.9)	16.7 (62.1)	11.9 (53.4)	5.9 (42.6)	3.0 (37.4)	−2.2 (28.0)
Average precipitation mm (inches)	36.0 (1.42)	33.6 (1.32)	59.7 (2.35)	114.9 (4.52)	218.3 (8.59)	315.9 (12.44)	320.6 (12.62)	321.8 (12.67)	172.6 (6.80)	90.7 (3.57)	43.5 (1.71)	32.7 (1.29)	1,760.3 (69.3)
Average precipitation days (≥ 0.1 mm)	6.9	8.8	11.1	11.9	16.4	18.0	18.7	18.8	13.8	6.7	5.6	5.7	142.4
Average relative humidity (%)	77	81	84	84	84	85	83	84	80	75	73	72	80
Mean monthly sunshine hours	103.3	79.0	71.8	101.1	160.4	165.6	199.5	196.0	190.5	200.7	167.5	140.7	1,776.1
Percentage possible sunshine	30	24	19	27	39	41	49	50	52	56	51	42	40
Source: China Meteorological Administrationall-time record lowall-time October record

== Administrative divisions ==
The city is divided into 3 subdistricts and 18 towns. Lianjiang's government is located in Luozhou Subdistrict.

=== Subdistricts ===
Lianjiang's 3 subdistricts are Luozhou Subdistrict, Chengnan Subdistrict, and Chengbei Subdistrict.

=== Towns ===
Lianjiang's 18 towns are Shicheng, Xinmin, Jishui, Hechun, Shijiao, Liangdong, Hengshan, Anpu, Yingzi, Qingping, Cheban, Gaoqiao, Shiling, Yatang, Shijing, Changshan, Tangpeng, and Heliao.

== Education ==
By the end of 2009 there were 577 schools, colleges and universities in Lianjiang with 312,000 students.

The Guangdong Institute of Arts and Sciences is located in the city.

== Transportation ==
The Litang–Zhanjiang railway and the Shenzhen–Zhanjiang high-speed railway both run through Lianjiang.

National Highway 207, National Highway 325, as well as a number of provincial highways run through Lianjiang.
