= Zhanjiang railway station =

Railway station in Zhanjiang, Guangdong, China

Zhanjiang 湛江
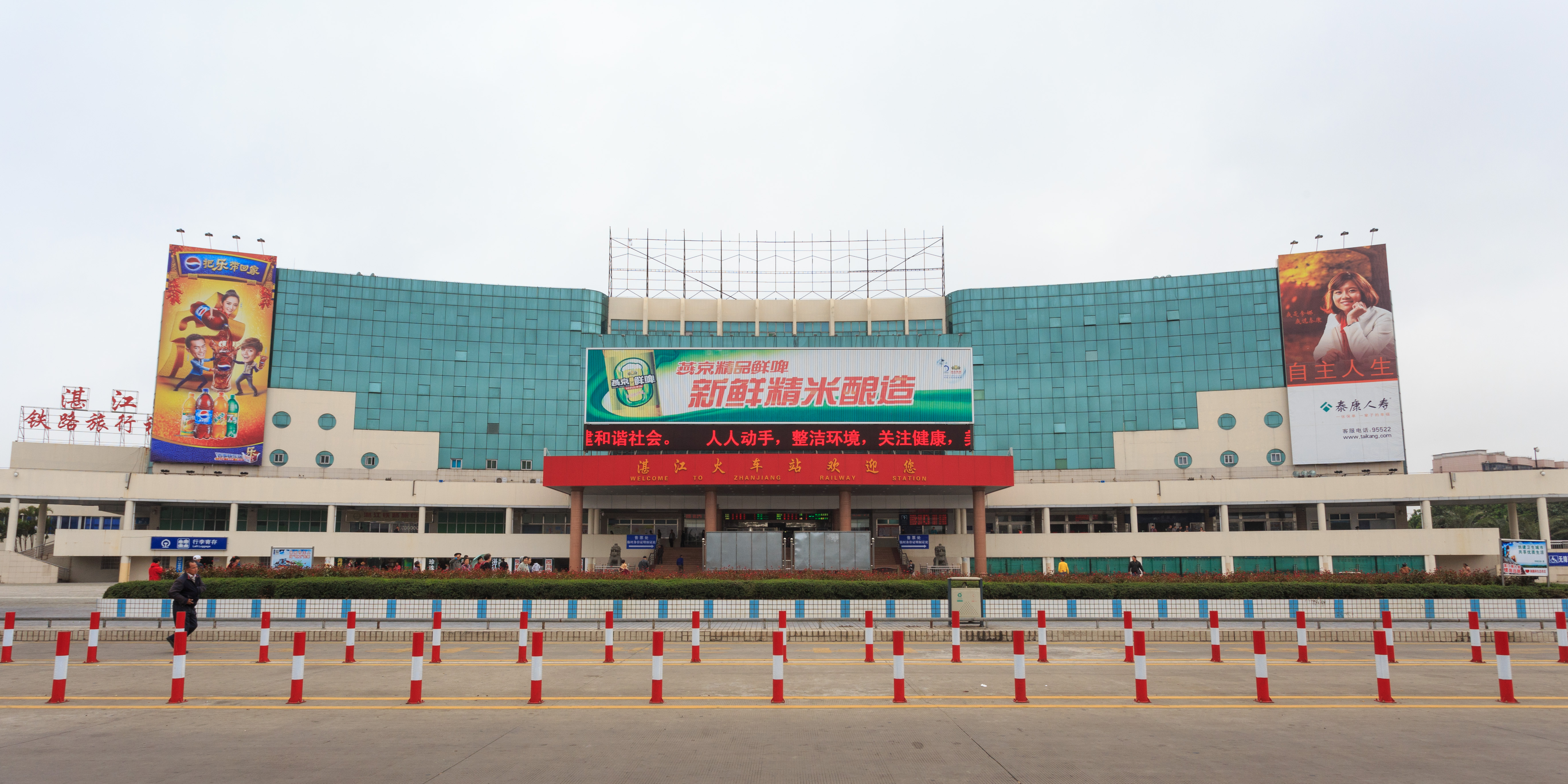

General information
- Location: Xiashan District, Zhanjiang, Guangdong; China
- Coordinates: 21°11′20.61″N 110°22′59.61″E
- Operator: CR Nanning
- Lines: Litang–Zhanjiang railway; Maoming–Zhanjiang railway
- Platforms: 3

Other information
- Station code: 37235 (TMIS code); ZJZ (telegraph code); ZJI (Pinyin code)
- Classification: Class 1 station (一等站)

History
- Opened: 1955
Location

Zhanjiang railway station (Chinese: 湛江站) is a railway station in Xiashan District, Zhanjiang, Guangdong, China. It serves as the terminus of the Litang–Zhanjiang railway.

== History ==
The station opened in 1955. In 2006, the Liuzhou Railway Bureau (now CR Nanning) decided to expand the railway station, building an extra platform and several train tracks to cater for the increasing demand.
