= Guangdong Institute of Arts and Sciences =

Education institute in Zhanjiang, China

- 廣東文理職業學院
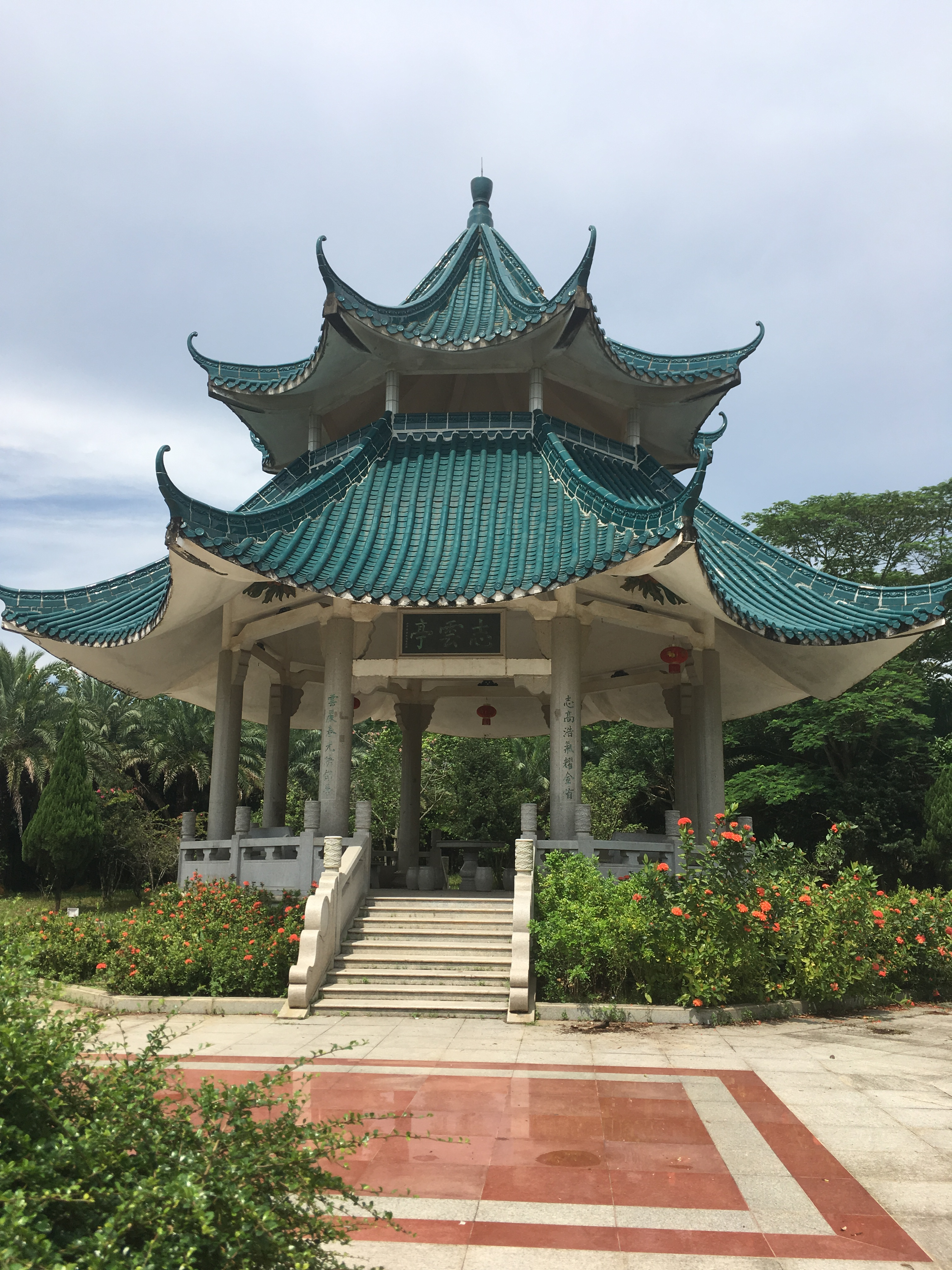
- Established: 2006; 20 years ago
- President: Liu Zhoutang（刘周堂）
- Academic staff: 726
- Students: 8,545
- Location: Lianjiang, Guangdong, China; 21°44′N 110°17′E
- Campus: Urban
- Nickname: Guang WenYuan (广文院); GuangDong WenLi (广东文理)
- Website: Guangdong Institute of Arts and Sciences Home page

Guangdong Institute of Arts and Sciences (simplified Chinese: 广东文理职业学院; traditional Chinese: 廣東文理職業學院; pinyin: Guǎngdōng Wénlǐ Zhíyè Xuéyuàn) is a higher education institute located in Lianjiang, Guangdong Province, China. The school is accredited as a full-time institution of higher learning by the Guangdong Provincial People's Government and the Chinese Ministry of Education. It is affiliated with the Guangdong Provincial Department of Education.

== Campus ==
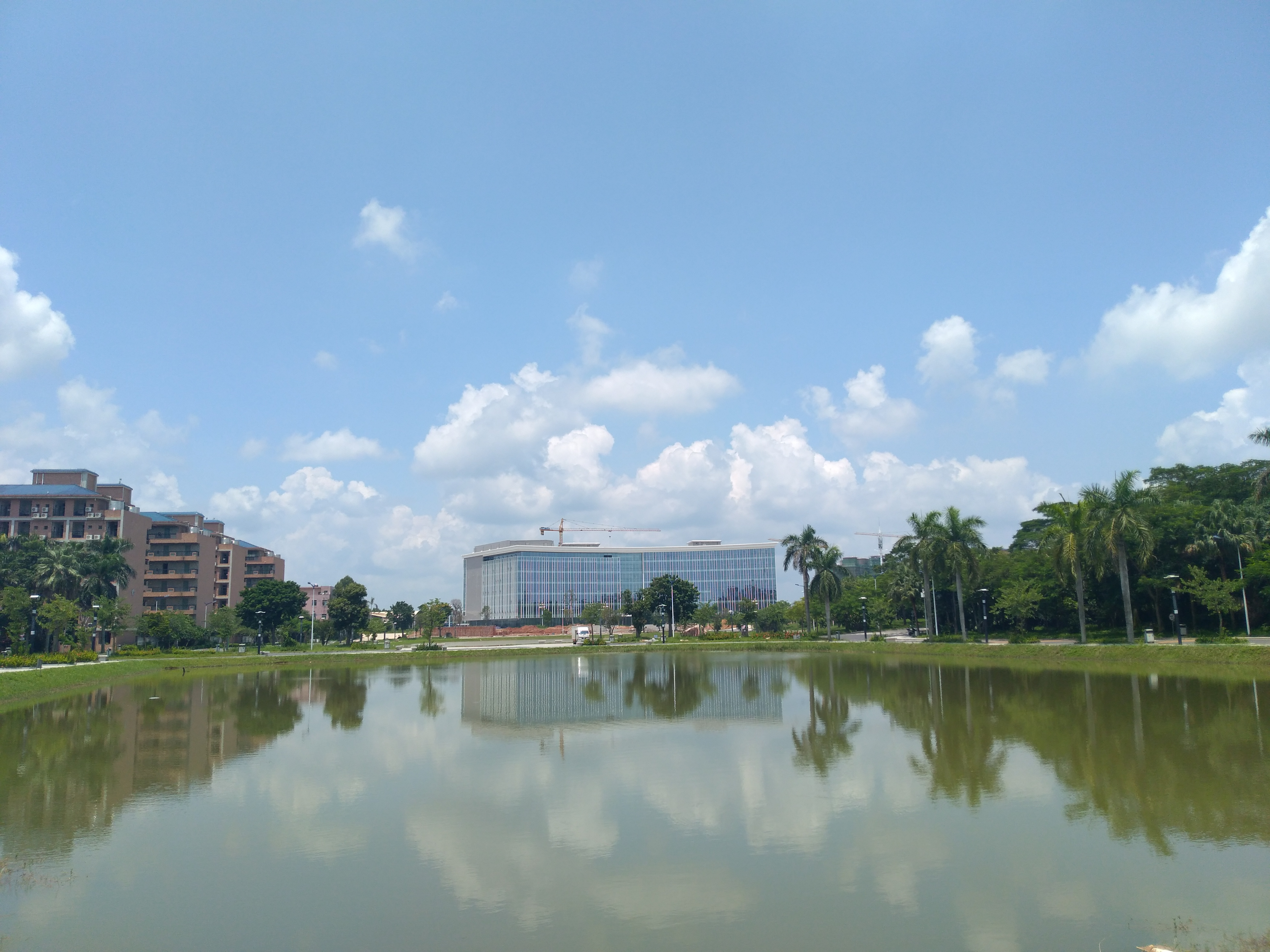
A view of the school's main library

The Guangdong Institute of Arts and Sciences is located in the county-level city of Lianjiang, in Zhanjiang, Guangdong, China, near the Beibu Gulf. The school's campus was designed to house 20,000 people, covers an area of 1,590 mu, and the campus' buildings cover over 400,000 square meters. The campus has a number of lecture halls, libraries, administrative buildings, student dorms, cafeterias, and art galleries. The campus also has numerous tennis courts, badminton courts, volleyball courts, table tennis tables, and other athletic facilities. The school states that to add ecologic value to the campus, it has planted over 3,000 different types of plants.

== Academics ==
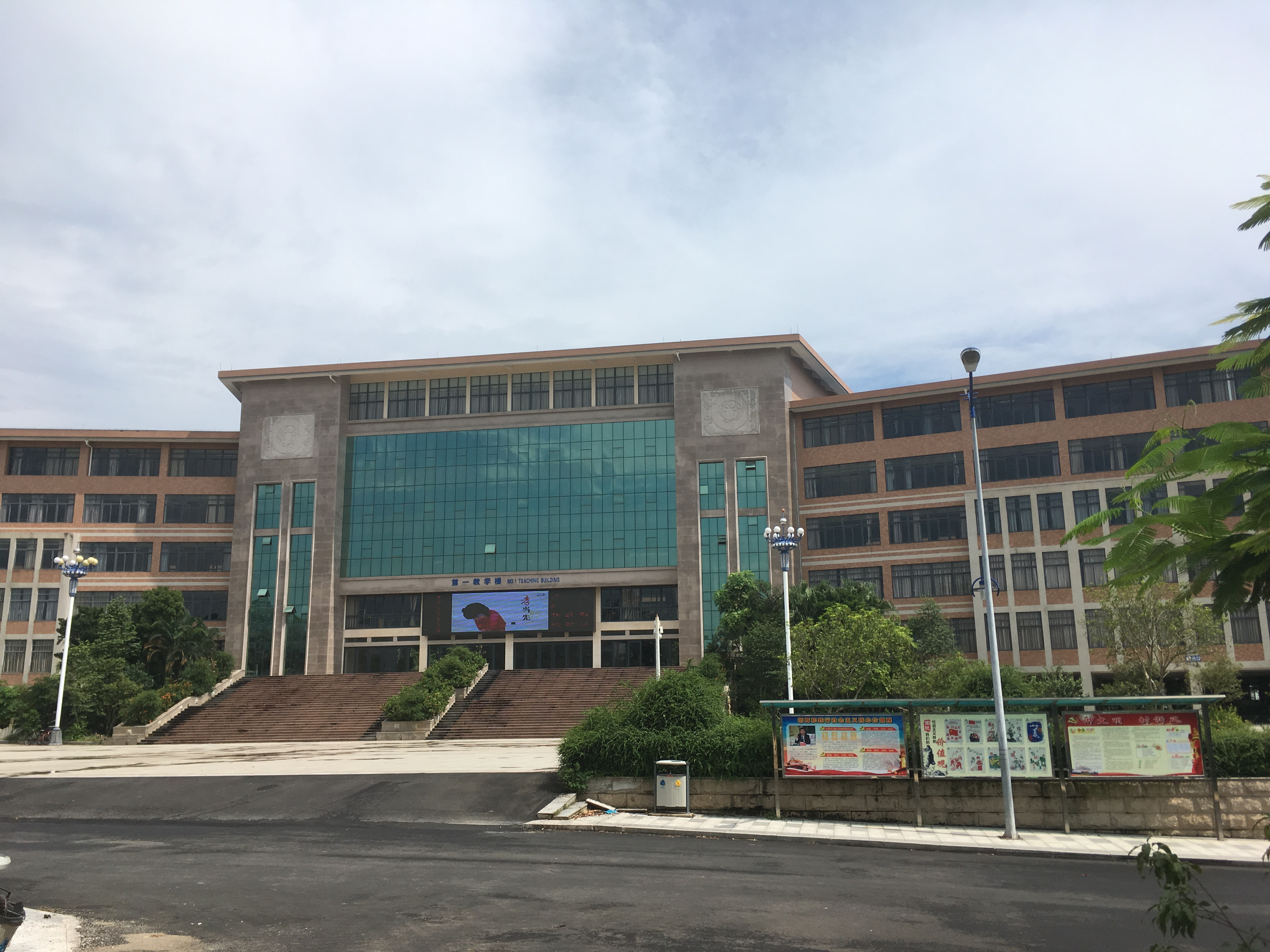
Lecture Hall No. 1

The school offers a total of 66 majors, spread across 7 departments and 4 colleges. There are 726 academic instructors, of which, 530 work for the school full-time. According to the school, in recent years, over 98% of graduates have gained employment.

== Student life ==
The school has 43 student organizations.

== Departments ==
- Institute of International Education
- Automotive Institute
- School of Architecture and Engineering
- Department of Art and Media
- Information Engineering
- Department of Finance
- Management department
- Department of Humanities
- Mechanical and Electrical Engineering
- Department of Bioengineering
- Ideological and political department
- Continuing Education

== Partner universities ==
- Canada: Thompson Rivers University
- Japan: Nagasaki International University
