= Cunjin Bridge Park =

Park in Zhanjiang, China

Cunjin Bridge Park (also called Cunjin Park) is located in the prefecture-level city Zhanjiang, China. As one of the largest parks in Zhanjiang, it is a popular tourist destination and is included in the old Zhanjiang Eight (Eight well-known tourist attractions). Cunjin Bridge Park is named after the Cunjin Bridge which was built in 1925 to commemorate Zhanjiang People’s resistance against French invasion in 1898. “Cunjin” (寸金), this word contains the meaning that an inch land of Chinese national territory is worth an inch of gold and we Chinese do not allow any foreign encroachment on our territory. An anti-French hero statue is erected at the center square of the park.

== History ==
On March 11, 1898, Qing China was required to cede Guangzhouwan (also called Kwangchow Wan) as a leased territory to France. On April 22, 1898, the French sent warships and soldiers to land in Suixi County, occupying the Haitou Fort (now in the Xiashan District, Zhanjiang City). After that, Guangzhouwan was leased by Qing China to France, according to the Treaty of Territoire de Kouang-Tchéou-Wan.

However, the French received a dozen of times of armed resistance from Zhanjiang people. On June 19, 1989, villagers from Nanliu, Haitou, Lvtang and Hongwu gathered together to fight against the French army. They were the first group of Zhanjiang people fighting against the French colonial rule in Guangzhouwan. After that, thousands of Zhanjiang people joined into the battles. Due to Zhanjiang people’s armed resistance, France made concession and changed the limit of the concession inland from Wannian Bridge (Xinqiao sugar refinery in Suixi County now) to Wenzhang River Bridge (Cunjin Bridge now).

== Description ==
Built in 1958, Cunjin Bridge park used to be called Xishan Park or People’s Park. In March 1981, its name was changed to Cunjin Bridge Park to commemorate Zhanjiang people’s resistance against the French invasion. The park is the biggest comprehensive park in Zhanjiang with an area of 513 acres, 113 of which are water. The Cunjin Bridge divides the park into two major halves. After years of continued development, Cunjin Park now includes gardens, a zoo, a dance hall, a cemetery, and boat rides.

== Main attractions ==
=== Cunjin Bridge ===
Cunjin Bridge is located in the west of Chikan District in Zhanjiang. In 1925, the gentry and villagers in Suixi and Mazhang area voluntarily raised money to build a bridge to commemorate Zhanjiang People's resistance against French invasion in 1898. Its name "Cunjin" contains the meaning that an inch land of Chinese national territory is worth an inch of gold and we Chinese do not allow any foreign encroachment on our territory. The bridge was extended and renovated in 1959 and in 1986. Now it has a total length of 22 meters and a total width of 24 meters. Beside the bridge stands a tablet with inscriptions on it. Cunjin Bridge is included as the municipal cultural relics protection units.

Cunjin Bridge stretches across the Chikan River (also called Wenzhang River). It represents the line that divides the French concession from Chinese residential areas when Guangzhouwan was leased to France. The west of the bridge was Chinese residential areas and the east the French concession.

=== Anti-France Hero Statue ===
In the central square of Cunjin Park, there is an anti-France hero statue. It is the heroic image of Zhanjiang people who bravely resisted against the French invasion of Zhanjiang. With a conch-shell trumpet hanging on his waist, he is holding a steel knife firmly and the knife is thrust deeply into the earth. On the front side of the statue was Guo Moruo's (Chinese: 郭沫若) handwriting -- "An inch of land is worth an inch of gold" (Chinese:一寸山河一寸金). The statue shows Zhangjiang people's determination to defense each inch of Chinese territory.

=== Cunjin Memorial Square ===
Cunjin Memorial Square is located to the north of Yueying Lake in Cunjin Bridge Park with an area of 2.36 hectares. The main part of the square is a grand relief wall erecting in the center of the square. On its front side are five relief pictures: Beacon-Fire of South China Sea (Chinese: 南海烽烟), the Spirit of Red Land (Chinese: 红土魂), Fighting with Blood (Chinese: 浴血奋战), Ode to Patriotic Souls (Chinese: 忠魂颂) and the Mainstay of Leizhou Peninsula (Chinese: 半岛砥柱). Behind the wall are inscriptions about Zhanjiang People’s resistance against the French colonial rule from 1898 to 1899 as well as the origin of Cunjin Bridge.

=== Cemetery of Revolutionary Martyrs ===
As the main part of the cemetery, the Revolutionary Martyrs Monument stands at the top of the hill. People have to climb up a 100-step stairway can they reach the monument. The whole monument is 18.5 meters with seven Chinese characters “革命烈士纪念碑” (The Revolutionary Martyrs Monument) engraved on the front side of the monument. On the front side of the monument base is engraved Zhanjiang People’s revolutionary struggle history and the martyrs' glorious deeds in the battles. The other three sides are white marble reliefs engraving the scenes of Zhanjiang people's performance in the Second Sino-Japanese War and Chinese Civil War.
