= Chengbei Subdistrict, Lianjiang, Guangdong =

Chengbei Subdistrict 城北街道
- Subdistrict
- Location in Guangdong
- Coordinates: 21°37′12″N 110°16′54″E
- Country: People's Republic of China
- Province: Guangdong
- Prefecture-level city: Zhanjiang
- County-level city: Lianjiang
- Elevation: 31 m (102 ft)
- Time zone: UTC+8 (China Standard)
- Area code: 0759

Chengbei Subdistrict (Chinese: 城北街道; pinyin: Chéngběi Jiēdào; Jyutping: sing^{4}bak^{1} gaai^{1}dou^{6}; lit. 'city north') is a subdistrict of Lianjiang in southwestern Guangdong, People's Republic of China, occupying the northern portion of the urban area of Lianjiang as suggested by its name. As of 2011, it has 2 residential communities (社区) and 3 villages under its administration.

== See also ==
- List of township-level divisions of Guangdong
