= Suixi =

Suixi may refer to the following places in China:

- Suixi County, Anhui (濉溪县)
  - Suixi Town (濉溪镇), seat of Suixi County, Anhui
- Suixi County, Guangdong (遂溪县)
