= Chinese ship Zhanjiang =

A number of vessels of the People's Liberation Army Navy have borne the name Zhanjiang, named after the city of Zhanjiang

- Chinese destroyer Zhanjiang (1988), a Type 051G destroyer commissioned in 1988 and decommissioned in 2020 with the pennant number 165
- Chinese destroyer Zhanjiang (2021), a Type 052D destroyer commissioned in 2021 also with the pennant number 165
