= Zhenjiang West railway station =

Former railway station in Jiangsu, China

Zhenjiang West 镇江西

General information
- Location: Qidong, Nantong, Jiangsu; China
- Coordinates: 32.208336°N 119.412533°E
- Line: Shanghai–Nanjing railway

History
- Opened: 1906
- Closed: 2003
Location

Zhenjiang West railway station (Chinese: 镇江西站) was a railway station located in Runzhou District, Zhenjiang, Jiangsu on the Beijing–Shanghai railway that handled passenger and freight traffic. In 1978, the new Zhenjiang Railway Station was opened due to the Beijing-Shanghai Railway moving south. In 2003, because the station affected traffic, it was demolished. In 2010, Zhongshan Square was built where the railway station once stood, to commemorate Sun-Yat sen who got off twice at Zhenjiang West station to inspect Zhenjiang.

== History ==
Opened with the Shanghai–Nanjing railway in 1906.

This station was situated on a less direct route further north of the existing railway line. This line was lifted in 2004.

== See also ==
- Zhenjiang railway station
