= Suixi County, Guangdong =

Suixi 遂溪县 Suikai
- County
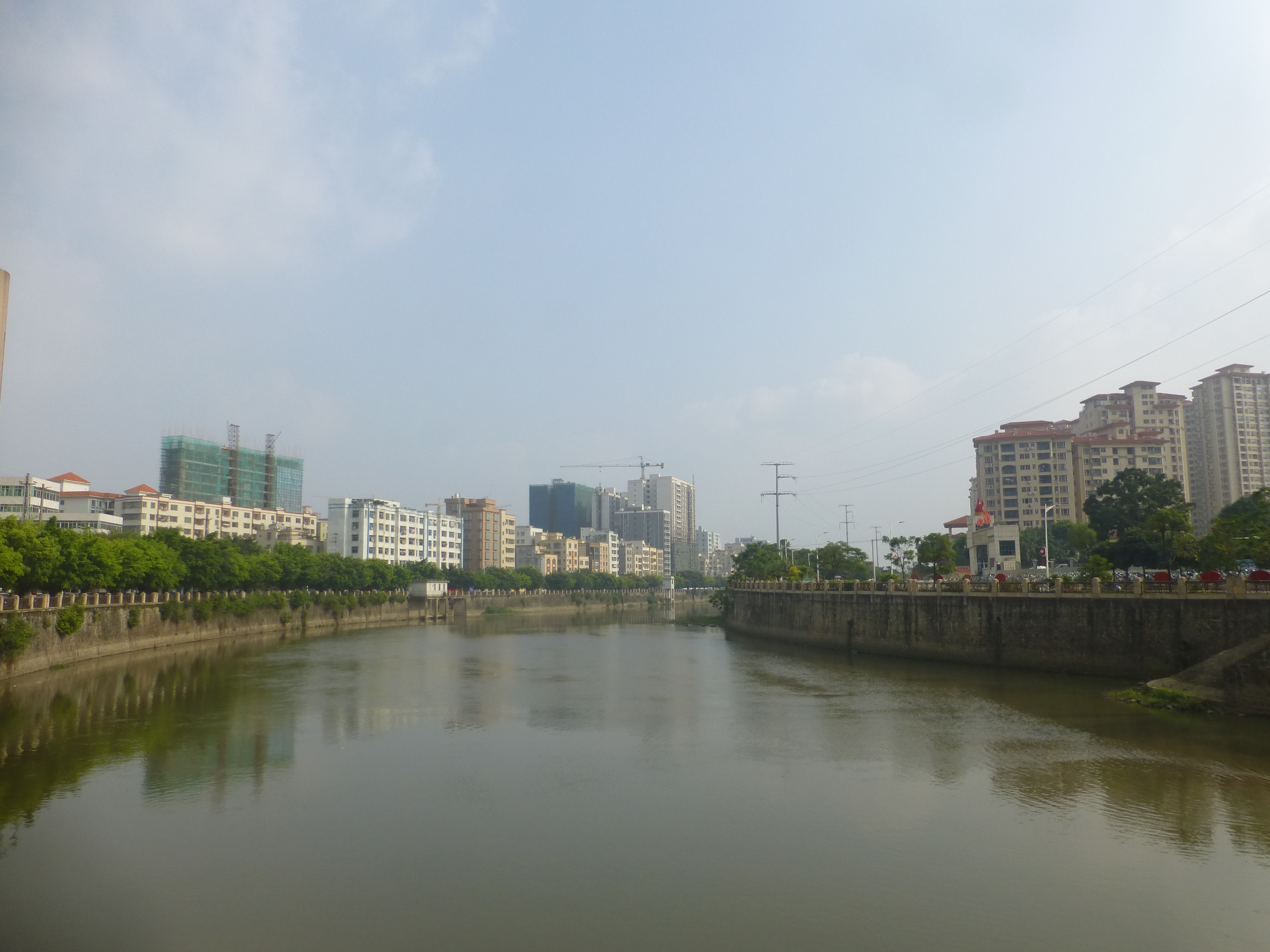

- Location in Guangdong
- Coordinates: 21°22′38″N 110°15′00″E
- Country: People's Republic of China
- Province: Guangdong
- Prefecture-level city: Zhanjiang

Area
  - Total: 2,144 km^{2} (828 sq mi)

Population (2020)
  - Total: 824,608
  - Density: 384.6/km^{2} (996.1/sq mi)
- Time zone: UTC+8 (China Standard)

Suixi County (postal: Suikai; Chinese: 遂溪; pinyin: Suìxī; Jyutping: seoi^{6}kai^{1}; Suixi Yue: [ɬui^{22} kʰɐi^{55}]) is a county in the southwest of Guangdong province, China. It is under the administration of the prefecture-level city of Zhanjiang and is located at the northern end of the Leizhou Peninsula, bordering the Gulf of Tonkin to the west.

== Climate ==
Climate data for Suixi, elevation 30 m (98 ft), (1991–2020 normals, extremes 1967–present)
| Month | Jan | Feb | Mar | Apr | May | Jun | Jul | Aug | Sep | Oct | Nov | Dec | Year |
|---|---|---|---|---|---|---|---|---|---|---|---|---|---|
| Record high °C (°F) | 29.5 (85.1) | 33.5 (92.3) | 35.9 (96.6) | 37.7 (99.9) | 37.5 (99.5) | 37.2 (99.0) | 38.0 (100.4) | 37.7 (99.9) | 36.5 (97.7) | 35.0 (95.0) | 33.8 (92.8) | 30.1 (86.2) | 38.0 (100.4) |
| Mean daily maximum °C (°F) | 19.9 (67.8) | 21.1 (70.0) | 24.0 (75.2) | 27.8 (82.0) | 31.5 (88.7) | 32.9 (91.2) | 32.7 (90.9) | 32.5 (90.5) | 32.0 (89.6) | 29.6 (85.3) | 26.3 (79.3) | 21.3 (70.3) | 27.6 (81.7) |
| Daily mean °C (°F) | 15.5 (59.9) | 17.0 (62.6) | 20.3 (68.5) | 23.9 (75.0) | 27.3 (81.1) | 28.7 (83.7) | 28.5 (83.3) | 28.1 (82.6) | 27.5 (81.5) | 24.9 (76.8) | 22.0 (71.6) | 16.7 (62.1) | 23.4 (74.1) |
| Mean daily minimum °C (°F) | 12.7 (54.9) | 14.3 (57.7) | 18.0 (64.4) | 21.3 (70.3) | 24.5 (76.1) | 25.8 (78.4) | 25.7 (78.3) | 25.4 (77.7) | 24.5 (76.1) | 21.6 (70.9) | 18.9 (66.0) | 13.4 (56.1) | 20.5 (68.9) |
| Record low °C (°F) | −1.4 (29.5) | 3.2 (37.8) | 4.3 (39.7) | 10.2 (50.4) | 14.6 (58.3) | 18.9 (66.0) | 22.1 (71.8) | 21.4 (70.5) | 16.8 (62.2) | 11.4 (52.5) | 6.0 (42.8) | 1.5 (34.7) | −1.4 (29.5) |
| Average precipitation mm (inches) | 31.0 (1.22) | 30.7 (1.21) | 54.3 (2.14) | 121.7 (4.79) | 231.5 (9.11) | 271.3 (10.68) | 299.7 (11.80) | 316.1 (12.44) | 189.4 (7.46) | 91.8 (3.61) | 44.7 (1.76) | 33.7 (1.33) | 1,715.9 (67.55) |
| Average precipitation days (≥ 0.1 mm) | 7.1 | 8.8 | 11.2 | 12.0 | 16.5 | 17.3 | 18.1 | 18.3 | 14.8 | 7.5 | 5.7 | 6.1 | 143.4 |
| Average relative humidity (%) | 80 | 84 | 86 | 86 | 85 | 85 | 84 | 86 | 83 | 78 | 76 | 75 | 82 |
| Mean monthly sunshine hours | 107.5 | 83.9 | 78.7 | 109.5 | 170.4 | 177.8 | 209.4 | 194.0 | 188.5 | 206.6 | 172.8 | 142.6 | 1,841.7 |
| Percentage possible sunshine | 32 | 26 | 21 | 29 | 42 | 44 | 51 | 49 | 52 | 58 | 52 | 43 | 42 |
Source: China Meteorological Administrationall-time record low
