= Chikan, Zhanjiang =

Chikan District 赤坎区
- District
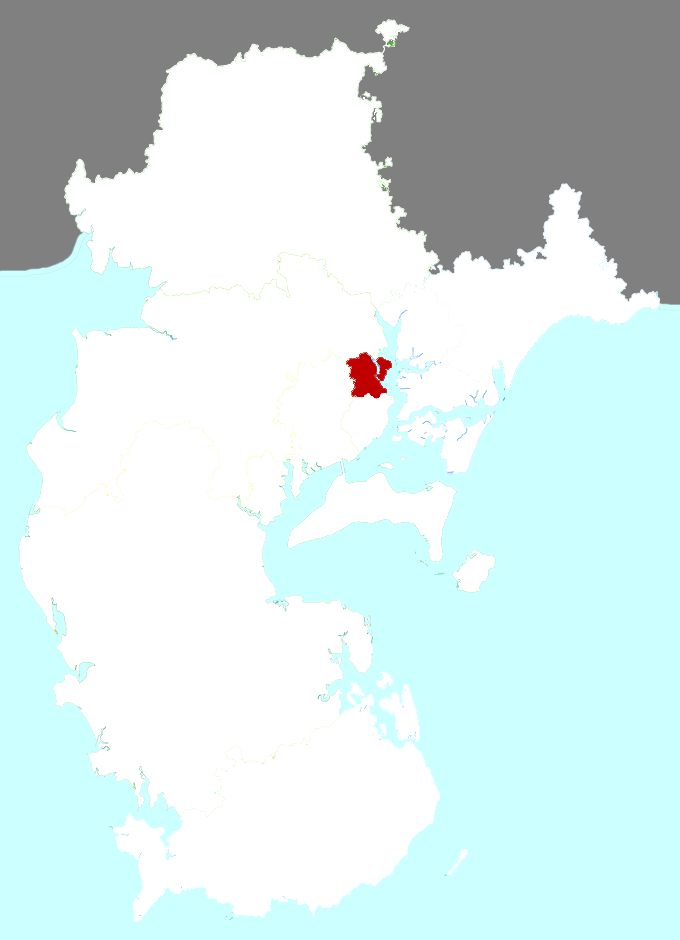
- Location of Chikan in Zhanjiang

- Location in Guangdong
- Coordinates (Chikan District government): 21°15′58″N 110°21′57″E
- Country: People's Republic of China
- Province: Guangdong
- Prefecture-level city: Zhanjiang

Area
  - Total: 70.85 km^{2} (27.36 sq mi)

Population (2020)
  - Total: 390,300
  - Density: 5,509/km^{2} (14,270/sq mi)
- Time zone: UTC+8 (China Standard)
- Area code: +86 (0)759

Chikan District (Chinese: 赤坎; pinyin: Chìkǎn; Leizhou Min: Chhieh-chhā; Jyutping: cek^{3}ham^{2}; lit. 'Red Ridge') is a district and the municipal seat of the city of Zhanjiang, Guangdong province, People's Republic of China.

== Administration ==
Chikan District is divided into 5 urban sub-districts and 3 townships:

Administrative subdivisions of Chikan District
English name	Chinese	Pinyin	Area in km^{2}	Population	Subdivisions	
English name	Chinese	Pinyin	Area in km^{2}	Population	Residential communities	Administrative villages
Zhonghua Street	中华街道	Zhōnghuá Jiēdào			4	0
Cunjin Street	寸金街道	Cùn Jīn Jiēdào		52,433	4	0
Minzhu Street	民主街道	Mínzhǔ Jiēdào			5	0
Zhongshan Street	中山街道	Zhōngshān Jiēdào			4	0
Shawan Street	沙湾街道	Shā Wān Jiēdào			3	0
Diaoshun Street	调顺街道	Diào Shùn jiēdào		7,405	1	1
Nanqiao Street	南桥街道	Nánqiáo Jiēdào			6	4
Beiqiao Street	北桥街道	Běiqiáo Jiēdào		31,876	1	8
