= Potou, Zhanjiang =

Potou 坡头区 Poteou
- District
- Location in Guangdong
- Coordinates: 21°12′41″N 110°27′00″E
- Country: People's Republic of China
- Province: Guangdong
- Prefecture-level city: Zhanjiang

Area
  - Total: 424 km^{2} (164 sq mi)

Population (2010 census)
  - Total: 333,700
  - Density: 787/km^{2} (2,040/sq mi)
- Time zone: UTC+8 (China Standard)
- Postal code: 524061
- Area code: 0759
- Major Nationalities: Han
- County-level divisions: 9
- License Plate Prefix: 粤G
- Website: http://www.ptq.gov.cn/

Potou District (simplified Chinese: 坡头区; traditional Chinese: 坡頭區; pinyin: Pōtóu qū; Leizhou Min: Pho-thôu kheu; Jyutping: Bo^{1}tau^{4} keoi^{1}) is a district of Zhanjiang, which is located at the southwestern end of Guangdong province, People's Republic of China, facing Hainan to the south.

== Location ==
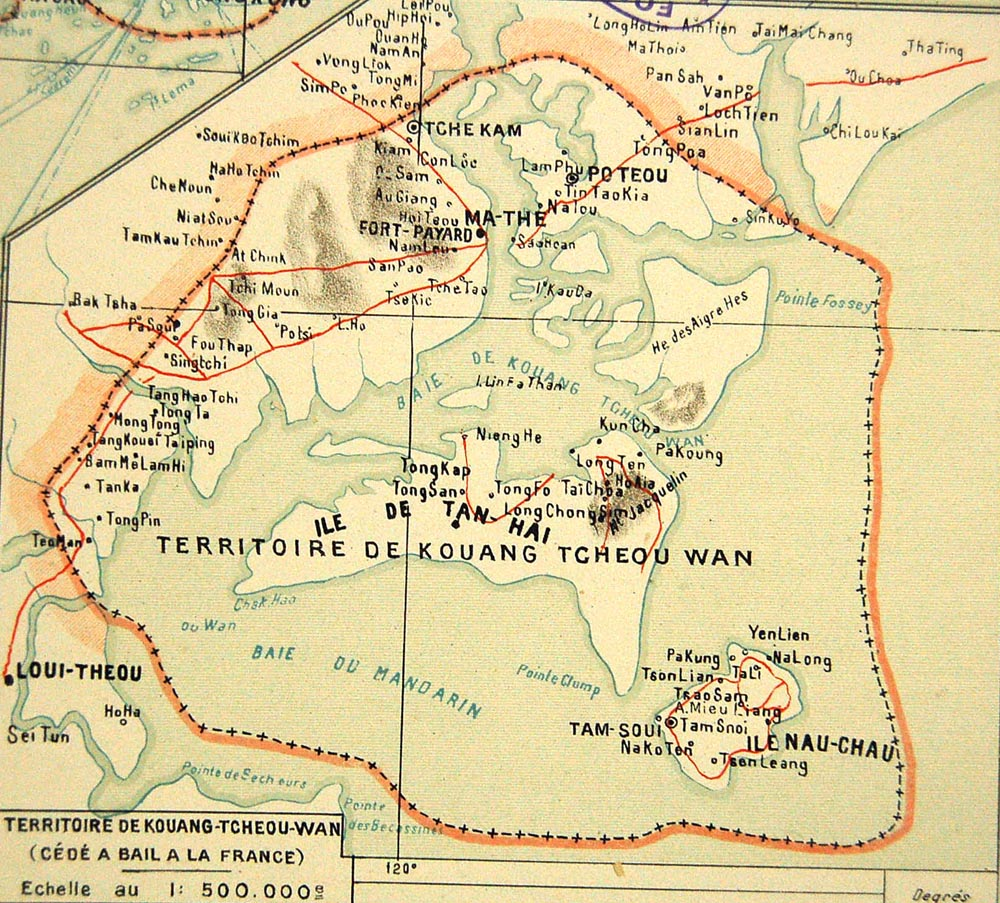
Map of Kouang-Tchéou-Wan

Potou consists of five towns, including Qiantang, Potou, Longtou, Nansan and Guandu, spanning between 109 degrees 20 minutes – 110 degrees 38 minutes east longitude and 21 degrees 5 minutes – 21 degrees 26 minutes north latitude, is located in the southernmost part of China and southwest of Guangdong province. It faces Southeast Asia, and is with the hinterland of South and Southwest China to the north and the Pacific Ocean to the south.

== Climate ==
Potou is located in the southern low-latitude region of the Tropic of Cancer, enjoys a tropical and subtropical monsoon climate. Regulated by a marine climate all year, it is neither severely cold in winter nor intensely hot in summer. The average annual temperature ranges between 22.7 C and 23.3 C, with mean annual sunshine duration reaching 1,864–2,160 hours and mean annual precipitation running up to 1,417–1,802 mm.

== Featured sights ==
=== Jianjiang Water Hub ===
The Jianjiang Water Hub, which was completed in March 2013, is a comprehensive water supply project. The 4.1-billion-yuan ($664 million) conservancy project is designed to supply 600,000 cubic meters of water daily, or 280 million cubic meters a year. The project is supposed to provide an iron-steel base in Zhanjiang and the Sino-Kuwaiti Refinery and Petrochemical Integrated project with 250,000 cubic meters and 85,000 cubic meters of water, respectively, on a daily basis. In addition, it will be able to meet production and daily water needs in the nearby area till at least 2020. The project helps improve the investment environment in Zhanjiang and contributes to its economic and social prosperity. It has a particular significance for the development of Donghai Island.

=== Zhanjiang Bay Bridge ===
The Zhanjiang Bay Bridge (湛江海湾大桥) is a cable-stayed bridge that crosses the harbour in Zhanjiang, Guangdong, China. The bridge's main span of 480 metres (1,575 ft) ranks it among the largest cable-stayed bridges in the world. The Zhanjiang Bay Bridge is one of the longest bridges in China with a main span about 500 meters long and navigational clearance of 45 meters. An advanced health monitoring system developed by the University of Illinois at Chicago was employed and it is still used today.
