= Zhanjiang =

City in Guangdong, China

Zhanjiang 湛江市 Tsamkong
- Prefecture-level city
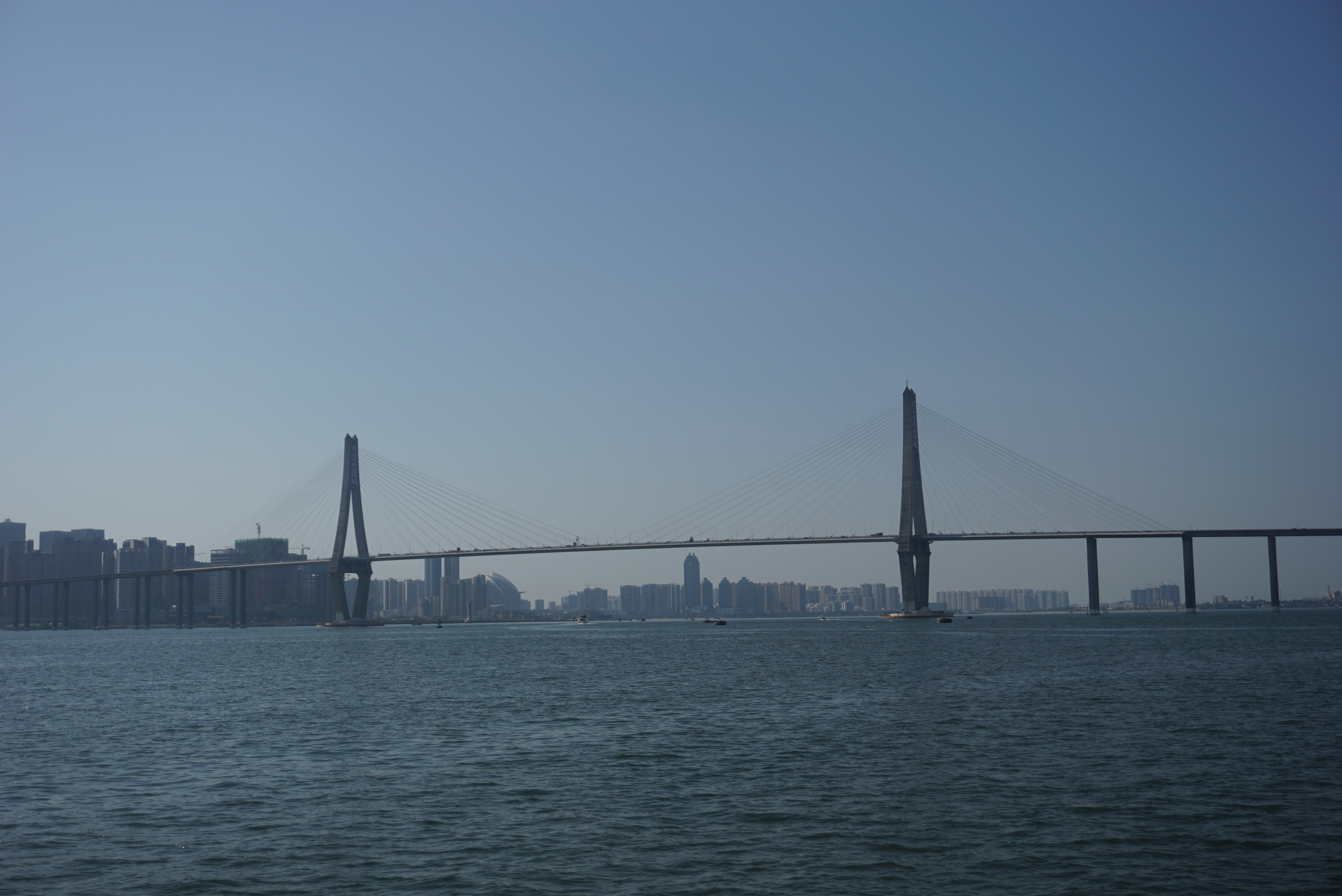
- Zhanjiang Bay Bridge with Chikan's skyline in the background
- Nickname: "Harbor City" (港城)
- Location of Zhanjiang City jurisdiction in Guangdong

- Location in China
- Coordinates (Zhanjiang municipal government): 21°16′12″N 110°21′27″E
- Country: People's Republic of China
- Province: Guangdong
- Municipal seat: Chikan District

Government
  - CCP Party Chief: Zheng Renhao (郑人豪)
  - Mayor: Jiang Jianjun (姜建军)

Area
  - Prefecture-level city: 13,225 km^{2} (5,106 sq mi)
  - Urban: 1,720.3 km^{2} (664.2 sq mi)
  - Metro: 1,720.3 km^{2} (664.2 sq mi)
- Elevation: 21 m (69 ft)

Population (2020 census)
  - Prefecture-level city: 6,981,236
  - Density: 527.88/km^{2} (1,367.2/sq mi)
  - Urban: 1,931,455
  - Urban density: 1,122.7/km^{2} (2,907.9/sq mi)
  - Metro: 1,931,455
  - Metro density: 1,122.7/km^{2} (2,907.9/sq mi)

GDP
  - Prefecture-level city: CN¥ 356 billion US$ 55.2 billion
  - Per capita: CN¥ 50,814; US$ 7,876
- Time zone: UTC+8 (China Standard)
- Postal code: 524000
- Area code: 759
- ISO 3166 code: CN-GD-08
- Major Nationalities: Han
- County-level divisions: 9
- License Plate Prefix: 粤G
- Local dialect: Leizhou Min; Yue Chinese; Hakka
- Website: www.zhanjiang.gov.cn

Zhanjiang
- "Zhanjiang", as written in Chinese
- Chinese: 湛江
- Jyutping: zaam^{3}gong^{1}
- Cantonese Yale: Jaamgōng
- Hanyu Pinyin: Zhànjiāng
- Postal: Tsamkong; Fort Bayard (pre-1946)
- Literal meaning: Azure River
Transcriptions
Standard Mandarin
- Hanyu Pinyin: Zhànjiāng
- Wade–Giles: Chan^{4}-ch'iang^{1}
- IPA: [tʂântɕjɑ́ŋ]
Wu
- Romanization: zae^{上}kaon^{上}
Hakka
- Romanization: Chhám-kông
Yue: Cantonese
- Yale Romanization: Jaamgōng
- Jyutping: zaam^{3}gong^{1}
Southern Min
- Hokkien POJ: Tām-kang
- Leizhou Romanization: Tchiàm-kōng

Zhanjiang is a coastal city in southern China, located on the Leizhou Peninsula in Guangdong province. It is a prefecture-level city which administers the entire Leizhou Peninsula and lies directly opposite to Haikou, the capital of the Hainan province, across the Qiongzhou Strait. It is the southernmost port on the coast of mainland China, serving as a centre of commerce and navigation for much of southwestern China. The city's built-up urban centre consists of four districts: Chikan, Xiashan, Potou, and Mazhang.

According to the 2020 census, the city's resident population was 6,981,236, down slightly from 6,994,832 in 2010—the highest decade-census figure to that date. More recent estimates (2023) place the total resident population at about 7,078,400, an all-time high, while the urban population of the built-up centre is estimated at roughly 3,402,700 (2023), also an all-time high.

In 2007, the Chinese Cities Brand Value Report ranked Zhanjiang among China's ten most livable cities.

Zhanjiang's culture is shaped by the Leizhou Peninsula, home to the distinctive Leizhou Opera (雷剧). The city also hosts a major base of the People's Liberation Army Navy.

== History ==
=== The Imperial China era ===
During the Qin dynasty (221–206 BC), the area of modern Zhanjiang was part of the Xiang Shire administrative division. Under the Han dynasty (206 BC–220 AD), Xuwen County was established as the administrative seat for the entire Leizhou Peninsula. The port of Zhanjiang became one of the earliest departure points on the Maritime Silk Road, fostering trade and the growth of the urban center. During the Song dynasty (960–1270 AD), many Putian (Hinghwa) colonists settled in the region, later forming the ethnolinguistic majority of the Leizhou Peninsula. Other significant groups included the Baiyue, Cantonese, Tanka, and foreign merchants.

=== French-leased territory ===
In 1898, the region was a small fishing port when the French established control, forcing China to lease a 99-year concession known as Guangzhouwan (historically Kwangchowan or Kwangchow Wan). Much of the local population had fled, so Cantonese peasants from north of Leizhou were brought in to repopulate the area, making Yue Chinese the dominant local language. The French developed the port, calling it Fort Bayard, intending it as a logistical center for their southern China concessions, including railway and mineral projects. However, the surrounding poverty and underdevelopment limited these efforts. The French held the enclave until 1943, when the Japanese occupied it during World War II. After the war, the enclave was briefly returned to France before being formally ceded to China in 1946 by General Charles de Gaulle.

=== Return to China ===
After reclaiming the territory from the French, the Republic of China renamed the area Zhanjiang, a historical variant of Zhanchuan, which had been under the jurisdiction of Zhanchuan County. Following the establishment of the People's Republic of China in 1949, Zhanjiang grew in strategic and economic importance. By 1957, it developed into a major modern deep-water port, capable of handling ships up to 50,000 tons.

As part of Deng Xiaoping's reform and opening-up policy in 1984, Zhanjiang was designated as an open city, attracting foreign investment and promoting industrial growth. Key industries included shipbuilding, engineering works, automobile manufacturing, electrical manufacturing, textiles, sugar refining, and chemical production.

In the early 1990s, a rail line connected Zhanjiang to Guangzhou, later extended to Hai'an at the southern tip of the Leizhou Peninsula. This line integrated with the Guangdong–Hainan Railway, allowing trains to be ferried across the Hainan Strait to Haikou city, further strengthening regional connectivity.

Zhanjiang's culture is distinct within Guangdong, heavily influenced by the Leizhou Peninsula. The local opera, Leizhou Opera (雷剧), is a unique art form with a history of over 300 years. The city is also a major base for China's South Sea Fleet, adding a significant naval element to its identity.

== Geography ==
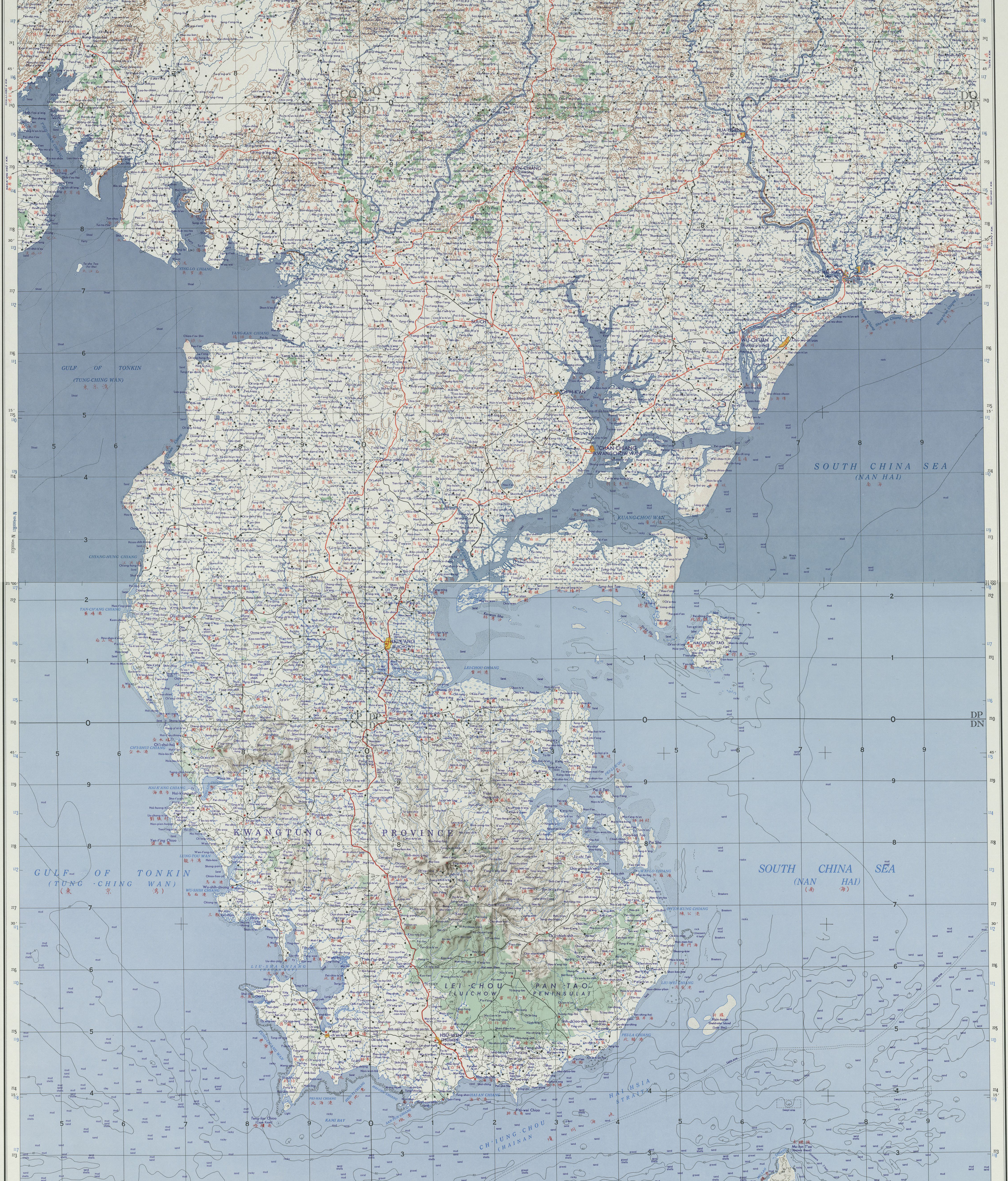
Zhanjiang (labeled CHAN-CHIANG (KWANGCHOWWAN) 湛江) (1954)

Zhanjiang is located on the eastern coast of the Leizhou Peninsula, southwest of Guangzhou, along an inlet of the South China Sea. The city's linguistic landscape reflects its history. In Potou District and other areas, Yue Chinese is spoken, brought by Cantonese peasants who settled during the French period, while the original Min-speaking population largely fled. Leizhou Min remains the prestige language in Xiashan District, Mazhang District, Xuwen County, and Leizhou City, and Hakka is spoken in Lianjiang County.

=== Climate ===
Zhanjiang has a humid subtropical climate (Köppen Cwa), with short, mild, overcast winters and long, very hot, humid summers. From April to September, rainfall is the heaviest and most frequent. The summer and winter temperatures are moderated due to the influence of the nearby ocean.

Climate data for Zhanjiang, elevation 53 m (174 ft), (1991–2020 normals, extremes 1913–present)
Month	Jan	Feb	Mar	Apr	May	Jun	Jul	Aug	Sep	Oct	Nov	Dec	Year
Record high °C (°F)	30.6 (87.1)	33.6 (92.5)	36.0 (96.8)	38.8 (101.8)	38.7 (101.7)	38.0 (100.4)	37.4 (99.3)	38.1 (100.6)	35.9 (96.6)	35.3 (95.5)	33.3 (91.9)	31.6 (88.9)	38.8 (101.8)
Mean daily maximum °C (°F)	19.7 (67.5)	20.6 (69.1)	23.3 (73.9)	27.1 (80.8)	30.7 (87.3)	32.3 (90.1)	32.4 (90.3)	32.1 (89.8)	31.1 (88.0)	29.1 (84.4)	25.9 (78.6)	21.7 (71.1)	27.2 (80.9)
Daily mean °C (°F)	16.0 (60.8)	17.2 (63.0)	20.0 (68.0)	23.8 (74.8)	27.2 (81.0)	28.8 (83.8)	28.9 (84.0)	28.4 (83.1)	27.5 (81.5)	25.3 (77.5)	21.9 (71.4)	17.7 (63.9)	23.6 (74.4)
Mean daily minimum °C (°F)	13.6 (56.5)	15.1 (59.2)	18.0 (64.4)	21.7 (71.1)	24.7 (76.5)	26.2 (79.2)	26.3 (79.3)	25.9 (78.6)	24.8 (76.6)	22.5 (72.5)	19.1 (66.4)	15.0 (59.0)	21.1 (69.9)
Record low °C (°F)	2.0 (35.6)	3.7 (38.7)	4.8 (40.6)	10.1 (50.2)	14.2 (57.6)	18.6 (65.5)	22.0 (71.6)	21.4 (70.5)	17.2 (63.0)	11.3 (52.3)	3.2 (37.8)	3.6 (38.5)	2.0 (35.6)
Average precipitation mm (inches)	32.9 (1.30)	27.9 (1.10)	49.6 (1.95)	107.4 (4.23)	212.8 (8.38)	263.3 (10.37)	248.5 (9.78)	313.2 (12.33)	238.0 (9.37)	125.1 (4.93)	41.6 (1.64)	34.8 (1.37)	1,695.1 (66.75)
Average precipitation days (≥ 0.1 mm)	6.7	8.7	10.4	11.6	14.4	15.2	15.4	17.3	14.7	7.5	5.6	5.8	133.3
Average relative humidity (%)	81	85	88	87	84	83	82	84	82	77	76	75	82
Mean monthly sunshine hours	106.6	83.1	79.3	118.1	182.4	194.6	224.9	202.7	191.1	205.1	173.2	138.1	1,899.2
Percentage possible sunshine	31	26	21	31	45	49	55	51	52	57	52	41	43
Source 1: China Meteorological Administration all-time extreme temperature
Source 2: The Yearbook of Indochina (1932-1933, 1939-1940)

== Administration ==
Zhanjiang has direct jurisdiction over nine county-level divisions:

Administrative divisions of Zhanjiang
Division code	English name	Chinese	Pinyin	Area in km^{2}	Population 2010	Seat	Postal code	Divisions				
Division code	English name	Chinese	Pinyin	Area in km^{2}	Population 2010	Seat	Postal code	Subdistricts	Towns	Townships	Residential communities	Administrative villages
440800	Zhanjiang City	湛江市	Zhànjiāng Shì	13225.44	6,994,832	Chikan District	524000	37	82	2	298	1500
440802	Chikan District	赤坎区	Chìkǎn Qū	70.85	303,824	Nanqiao Subdistrict	524000	8			25	32
440803	Xiashan District	霞山区	Xiáshān Qū	116.97	487,093	Gongnong Subdistrict	524000	12			49	32
440804	Potou District	坡头区	Pōtóu Qū	562.37	333,239	Nandiao Subdistrict	524000	2	5		8	58
440811	Mazhang District	麻章区	Mázhāng Qū	970.09	487,712	Mazhang Town	524000	3	4		13	100
440823	Suixi County	遂溪县	Suìxī Xiàn	2142.89	886,452	Suicheng Town	524300		15		25	229
440825	Xuwen County	徐闻县	Xúwén Xiàn	1954.37	698,474	Wencheng Subdistrict	524100	1	12	2	25	173
440881	Lianjiang	廉江市	Liánjiāng Shì	2839.89	1,443,099	Luozhou Subdistrict	524400	3	18		47	336
440882	Leizhou	雷州市	Léizhōu Shì	3707.10	1,427,664	Leicheng Subdistrict	524200	3	18		53	418
440883	Wuchuan	吴川市	Wúchuān Shì	860.90	927,275	Meilu Subdistrict	524500	5	10		53	141

== Military ==
Zhanjiang serves as the headquarters of the South Sea Fleet of the People's Liberation Army Navy. It also serves as the home base of 1st and 2nd (formerly 164th) Marine Brigades of the People's Liberation Army Navy Marine Corps.

== Economy ==
Zhanjiang is a major port city and trade center with a diversified industrial base that includes shipbuilding, textiles, petrochemicals, automobiles, chemicals, electrical appliances, and rice processing. Since the mid-2010s, the city has rapidly developed into a modern manufacturing and export hub. By 2022, the Zhongke (Guangdong) Refinery and Petrochemical Project processed 14.55 million tons of crude oil and produced 834,600 tons of ethylene, with an output value exceeding 100 billion yuan.

In 2024, investment in key projects topped 487 billion yuan, while industrial investment rose 56% year-on-year. Zhanjiang's strategy now focuses on high-quality growth, expanding industries such as green steel, new energy, AI, marine equipment, and port logistics, alongside its vital role in the South China Sea oil and gas sector. By 2025, manufacturing is projected to contribute nearly 30% of GDP.

=== Port of Zhanjiang ===
The Port of Zhanjiang, historically known as Guangzhouwan, is one of China's key maritime gateways. Built in 1956, it was the first modern port designed and developed after the founding of the People's Republic of China and today serves as the headquarters of the People's Liberation Army Navy's South Sea Fleet.

Recognized as one of China's eight major ports, Zhanjiang handles an annual throughput exceeding 260 million tons. As a natural deep-water port, it has an average depth of around 15–20 meters and is protected by three outer islands that provide safe anchorage and shelter for large vessels. The port connects southern and western China to the global market, enabling trade with over 100 countries and supporting major industries in the region—particularly steel manufacturing and petrochemicals.

=== Agriculture ===
Zhanjiang has long been a hub of agricultural production, historically dominated by sugarcane, which reached over 10 million tons in 2007. The city also produces pineapples, bananas, papayas, seafood, farmed prawns, fish, and Akoya cultured pearls.

By 2025, Zhanjiang's agriculture had modernized and diversified, integrating eco-friendly farming, aquaculture, and high-tech greenhouses. New agricultural enterprises continue to expand, while collaboration with Taiwan and Guangdong supports advanced techniques in tropical fruit cultivation, fisheries, and ecological agriculture, strengthening both domestic supply and exports.

=== Industry ===
Zhanjiang's industrial base has transitioned from rapid growth in the early 2000s to modern, high-value clusters by 2025. While in 2007 its total industrial output reached about 112 billion yuan, with 714 major enterprises and 132 firms each generating over 100 million yuan in output, today the focus is on large-scale advanced manufacturing and green industries. The Zhanjiang Economic and Technological Development Zone, founded in 1984 and covering roughly 9.2 km^{2}, remains a key hub for automobile manufacturing, biotechnology, and software development.

By 2024, key projects in Zhanjiang achieved aggregated investment exceeding 487 billion yuan in the first seven months, and major clusters such as green petrochemicals, advanced materials, and new energy each approached or surpassed 100 billion yuan in annual output.

=== Business ===
In 2007, the total value of retail sales of consumer goods in Zhanjiang reached 38.216 billion yuan, marking a 19.5% increase over the previous year.

== Transportation ==
=== Air ===
By 2025, Zhanjiang has strengthened its role as a regional aviation hub. Zhanjiang Wuchuan International Airport, opened in 2022, features a 3,200‑meter runway and handles around 5 million passengers and 30,000 tons of cargo annually. A nearby city-terminal in Maoming improves access via shuttle connections, while ongoing infrastructure upgrades integrate the airport with expressways and rail networks.

Domestic flights connect Zhanjiang to major Chinese cities, and regional international routes link it to Northeast Asia. The expanded air network supports tourism, logistics, and trade, reinforcing Zhanjiang's position in the modern coastal economic belt and its connectivity with Hainan Island.

=== Rail ===
Zhanjiang is a key railway hub in southern China, served by five major railways: the Lizhan Railway, Shenzhan Railway, Luozhan Railway, Yuehai Railway, and Hezhan Railway. These railways connect the city with major urban centers in Guangdong province, as well as other regions in southwestern China, supporting both passenger travel and freight transport.

The city has two main railway stations:

- Zhanjiang Railway Station – serving the Lizhan, Luozhan, and Hezhan Railways, it functions as the primary station for conventional rail services and regional freight movement.
- Zhanjiang West Railway Station – serving the Yuehai Railway and the Shenzhan High-Speed Railway, this station provides fast passenger connections to major cities, including Guangzhou, Shenzhen, and other high-demand destinations across Guangdong.

By 2025, the integration of these rail networks with local public transit and highways has enhanced intermodal connectivity, allowing passengers and cargo to move efficiently between the city, the port, and surrounding regions. High-speed services from Zhanjiang West Railway Station now reduce travel time to Guangzhou to under four hours, supporting regional economic integration, tourism, and trade. The railway network also plays a strategic role in linking Zhanjiang's industrial and agricultural outputs to domestic and international markets.

=== Highway ===
Zhanjiang is a critical road hub in southern China, with an extensive highway network connecting the city to major urban centers and neighboring provinces. Key routes include:

- G325 National Highway – linking Zhanjiang with western and central Guangdong, providing a direct route to major inland cities.
- G228 Coastal Highway – running along the Leizhou Peninsula, connecting Zhanjiang to other coastal cities and ports.
- S31 Zhanjiang Ring Expressway – a modern beltway that encircles the city, improving traffic flow and connecting industrial zones, the port, and urban districts.
- Additional provincial and county roads support access to rural areas, industrial parks, and tourist destinations, ensuring smooth logistics for agriculture, industry, and trade.

By 2025, Zhanjiang's highway system is closely integrated with its rail and air networks, forming an intermodal transportation hub. This allows efficient movement of passengers and freight, reduces travel time, and strengthens Zhanjiang's position as a regional trade and logistics center, particularly for Southwest China and Hainan Island.

== Tourism ==
By 2025, Zhanjiang has developed into a coastal tourism and cultural hub, combining natural scenery, historical heritage, and modern leisure experiences.

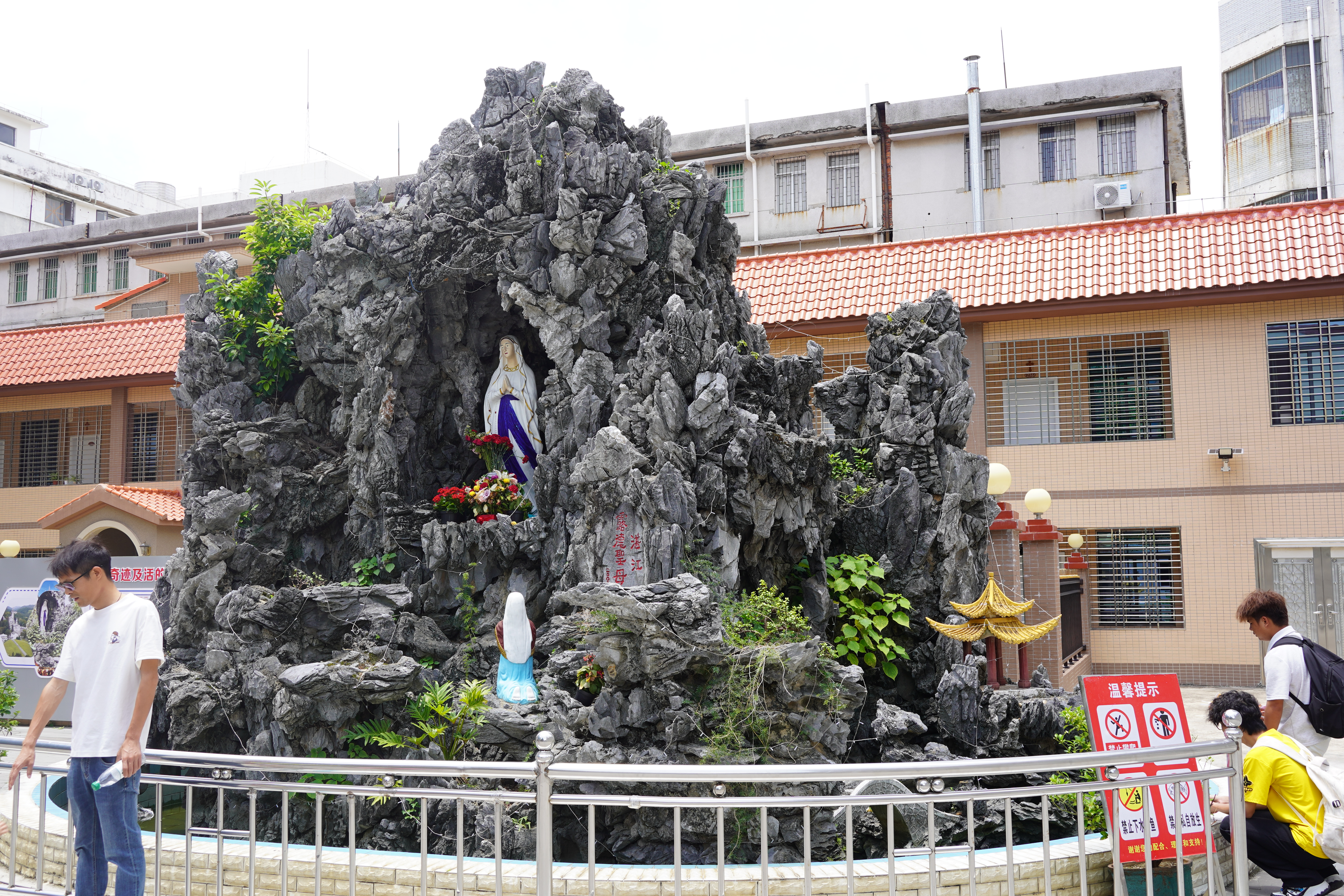
Recreation of the Lourdes cave (France), sacred for Catholics, behind the Saint Victor church, Xiashan district.

- Huguangyan National Geopark – features a volcanic lake, hiking trails, and eco-tourism opportunities.
- Chikan Old Street (Chikan District) – colonial-era French and Lingnan architecture, shopping, dining, and cultural experiences.
- Jinsha Bay & Donghai Island (Mazhang District) – beaches, water sports, and island resorts.
- Zhanjiang Mangrove National Nature Reserve (Potou District) – mangrove forests, wildlife observation, and eco-tourism.
- French-Style Street (Xiashan District) – themed shopping, food, art installations, Catholic heritage and cultural events; attracts hundreds of thousands of visitors annually.

Zhanjiang emphasizes sustainable tourism, preserving natural areas while integrating modern resorts, cultural festivals, and local cuisine, making it a popular destination for both domestic and international travelers.

=== Parks and recreation ===
- South Park
- North Park
- Hoi Tin Park
- Southern tropical garden
- Sino-Australian Friendship Garden
- Jin Sha Wan Park
- Golden Bay promenade Guanhai
- Zhanjiang Waterfront Park
- Park fishing port
- Xia Lake Park
- Green River Wetland Park
- Cunjin Bridge Park

=== French architecture ===
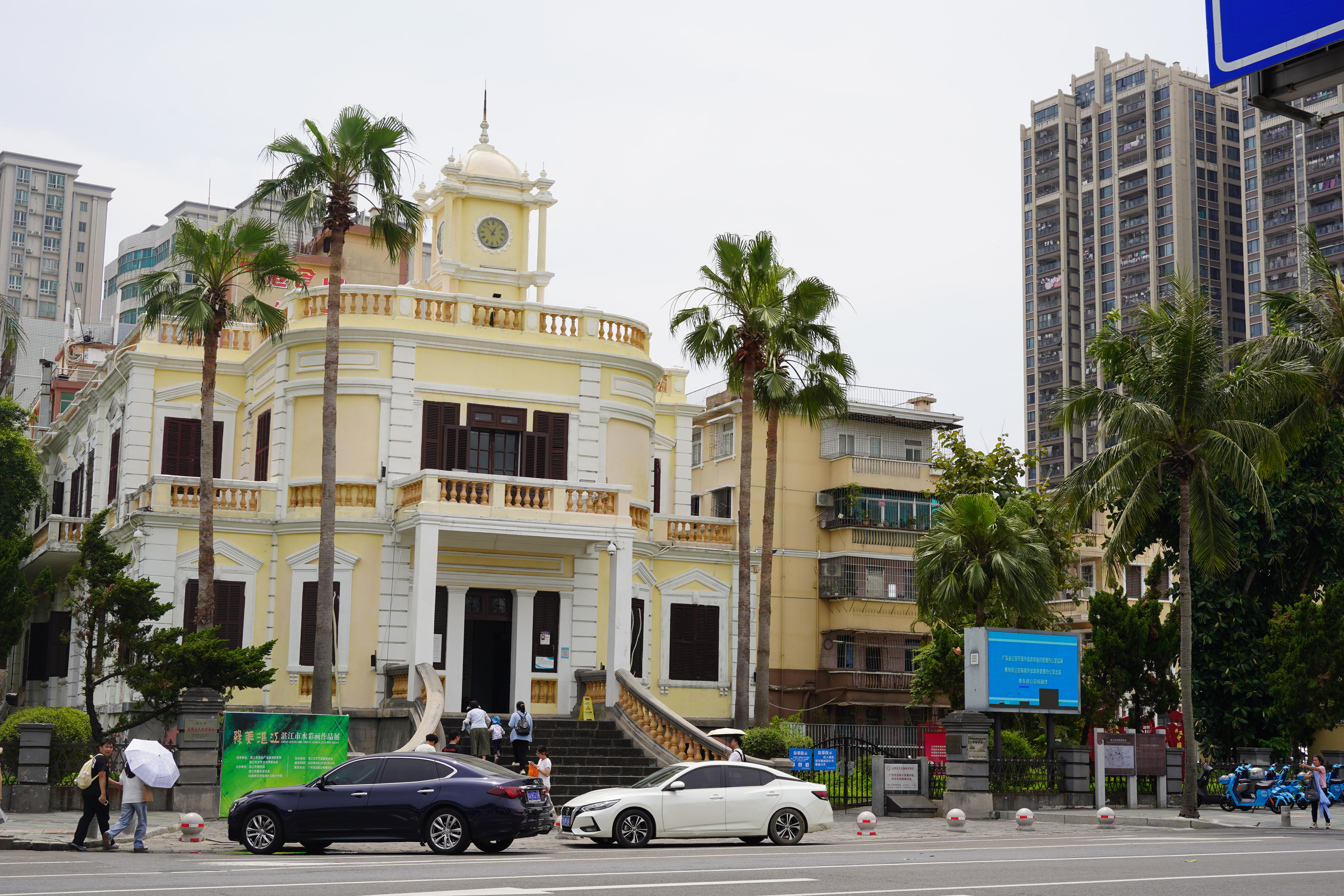
The former local colonial government's building in Xiashan district.

Zhanjiang's French-style architecture in Chikan Old Street (Chikan District) and French-Style Street (Xiashan District) features arched windows, balconies, and tiled roofs. Restored for tourism, these areas combine shopping, dining, art, and cultural experiences, making them key attractions for both domestic and international visitors in 2025.

== Sports ==
The 40,000-capacity Zhanjiang Olympic Main Stadium is the largest sports venue by capacity in Zhanjiang.

Zhanjiang has also developed as a hub for professional and recreational sports, with facilities supporting football, basketball, swimming, athletics, and water sports. Key venues include:

- Zhanjiang Olympic Sports Center (Potou District) – main stadium with 40,000 seats, plus a gymnasium, ball-sports hall, and aquatic facilities.
- Zhanjiang Sports Centre – multi-use stadium holding around 20,000 spectators, primarily for football matches.
- Zhanjiang Aquatic Sports Center (Jinsha Bay, Chikan District) – focuses on sailing, water sports, and competitions.

Annual events include marathons, regional football tournaments, and water sports competitions, while the city promotes youth programs and community fitness initiatives, supporting healthy lifestyles and regional sports development.

== Education ==
Zhanjiang offers a comprehensive education system from primary to higher education, emphasizing STEM, vocational training, and international collaboration. Key institutions include Guangdong Ocean University, specializing in marine science and aquaculture, and Lingnan Normal University, focusing on teacher training and humanities. Vocational schools train students in engineering, IT, manufacturing, and healthcare, aligning with the city's industrial and economic needs. By 2025, education in Zhanjiang supports industrial, technological, and maritime development, preparing skilled professionals for local and regional industries.

=== Demographics ===
As of 2025, Zhanjiang has an estimated population of around 7 million, with roughly 2 million living in the urban districts of Chikan, Xiashan, Potou, and Mazhang. The city is ethnically diverse, with Han Chinese forming the majority alongside smaller communities of Zhuang, Li, Miao, and other ethnic groups. The population is concentrated in urban areas, while rural communities remain engaged in agriculture, fisheries, and emerging industries. Zhanjiang continues to experience moderate urban growth, driven by industrial development, trade, and improved infrastructure.

== See also ==
- List of twin towns and sister cities in China
- Chinese ship Zhanjiang
