= Xiashan, Zhanjiang =

Xiashan 霞山区
- District
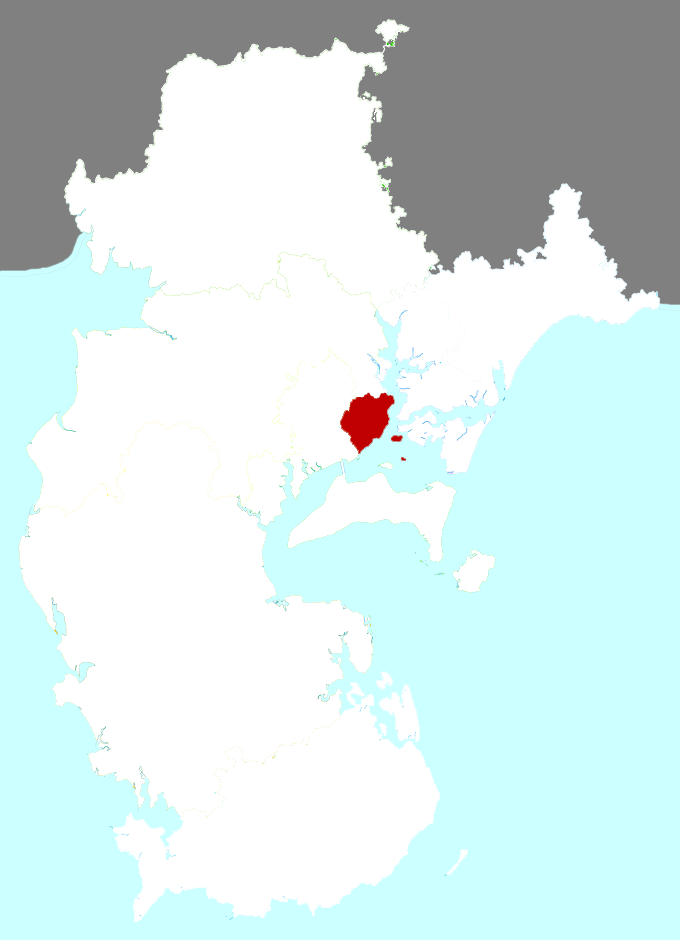
- Location of Xiashan in Zhanjiang

- Location in Guangdong
- Coordinates: 21°11′31″N 110°23′53″E
- Country: People's Republic of China
- Province: Guangdong
- Prefecture-level city: Zhanjiang

Area
  - Total: 88 km^{2} (34 sq mi)

Population (2020)
  - Total: 625,225
  - Density: 7,100/km^{2} (18,000/sq mi)
- Time zone: UTC+8 (China Standard)

Xiashan District (Chinese: 霞山区; pinyin: Xiáshānqū) is a district in the city of Zhanjiang, Guangdong province, China. It was historically known as Fort Bayard, and was the capital of the French territory Guangzhouwan.
