= List of universities and colleges in Guangdong =

As of 2022, Guangdong have 160 institutions of higher education, ranking first in South Central China region and 2nd among all Chinese provinces/municipalities after Jiangsu (168). Guangdong is also the seat of 14 adult higher education institutions. Many universities and colleges are located in major cities like Shenzhen and Guangzhou. Guangzhou, the capital of Guangdong, hosts 83 institutions of higher education (excluding adult colleges), ranking 1st in South China region and 2nd (tie) nationwide after Beijing. There are 8 national key universities under Double First Class University Plan in Guangdong, the highest in South Central China region and the fourth-highest after Beijing, Jiangsu and Shanghai.

The following is List of Universities and Colleges in Guangdong.

Name	Chinese name	Type	Type	Location
Sun Yat-sen University	中山大学	National (Direct)	Double First Class University, Project 211, Project 985	Guangzhou
Jinan University	暨南大学	National (Other)	Double First Class University, Project 211	Guangzhou
South China University of Technology	华南理工大学	National (Direct)	Double First Class University, Project 211, Project 985	Guangzhou
Southern University of Science and Technology	南方科技大学	Provincial	Double First Class University	Shenzhen
Shenzhen University	深圳大学	Provincial		Shenzhen
Shenzhen Technology University	深圳技术大学	Provincial		Shenzhen
Guangdong University of Technology	广东工业大学	Provincial		Guangzhou
Wuyi University	五邑大学	Provincial		Jiangmen
Shantou University	汕头大学	Provincial		Shantou
South China Agricultural University	华南农业大学	Provincial	Double First Class University	Guangzhou
Guangdong Ocean University	广东海洋大学	Provincial		Zhanjiang
Guangzhou Medical University	广州医科大学	Provincial	Double First Class University	Guangzhou
Guangdong Medical University	广东医科大学	Provincial		Zhanjiang
Guangzhou University of Chinese Medicine	广州中医药大学	Provincial	Double First Class University	Guangzhou
Guangdong Pharmaceutical University	广东药科大学	Provincial		Guangzhou
South China Normal University	华南师范大学	Provincial	Double First Class University, Project 211	Guangzhou
Guangdong University of Foreign Studies	广东外语外贸大学	Provincial		Guangzhou
Southern Medical University	南方医科大学	Provincial		Guangzhou
Guangdong Polytechnic Normal University	广东技术师范大学	Provincial		Guangzhou
Guangdong University of Finance and Economics	广东财经大学	Provincial		Guangzhou
The Chinese University of Hong Kong, Shenzhen	香港中文大学（深圳）	Mainland-HMT		Shenzhen
Shenzhen MSU-BIT University	深圳北理莫斯科大学	Sino-foreign		Shenzhen
Beijing Normal University at Zhuhai	北京师范大学珠海校区	National (Direct)	Double First Class University, Project 211, Project 985	Zhuhai
Nanfang College, Sun Yat-Sen University	中山大学南方学院	Private		Guangzhou
Beijing Institute of Technology, Zhuhai	北京理工大学珠海学院	Private		Zhuhai
Tsinghua Shenzhen International Graduate School	清华大学深圳国际研究生院	National (Direct)	Double First Class University, Project 211, Project 985	Shenzhen
Tsinghua-Berkeley Shenzhen Institute	清华-伯克利深圳学院	Provincial		Shenzhen
Peking University Shenzhen Graduate School	北京大学深圳研究生院	National (Direct)	Double First Class University, Project 211, Project 985	Shenzhen
Harbin Institute of Technology (Shenzhen)	哈尔滨工业大学深圳校区	National (Direct)	Double First Class University, Project 211, Project 985	Shenzhen
BNU-HKBU United International College	北京师范大学-香港浸会大学联合国际学院	Mainland-HMT		Zhuhai
Zhuhai College of Science and Technology	珠海科技学院	Private		Zhuhai
Guangzhou College, South China University of Technology	华南理工大学广州学院	Private		Guangzhou
Sonton College, Guangzhou University	广州大学松田学院	Private		Guangzhou
Huali College, Guangdong University of Technology	广东工业大学华立学院	Private		Guangzhou
Zhujiang College, South China Agricultural University	华南农业大学珠江学院	Private		Guangzhou
Cunjin College, Guangdong Ocean University	广东海洋大学寸金学院	Private		Zhanjiang
Shaoguan University	韶关学院	Provincial		Shaoguan
Huizhou University	惠州学院	Provincial		Huizhou
Hanshan Normal University	韩山师范学院	Provincial		Chaozhou
Lingnan Normal University	岭南师范学院	Provincial		Zhanjiang
Zhaoqing University	肇庆学院	Provincial		Zhaoqing
Jiaying University	嘉应学院	Provincial		Meizhou
Guangzhou Sport University	广州体育学院	Provincial		Guangzhou
Guangzhou Academy of Fine Arts	广州美术学院	Provincial		Guangzhou
Xinghai Conservatory of Music	星海音乐学院	Provincial		Guangzhou
Guangdong Baiyun University	广东白云学院	Private		Guangzhou
Guangzhou University	广州大学	Provincial		Guangzhou
Guangzhou Maritime Institute	广州航海学院	Provincial		Guangzhou
Guangdong Police College	广东警官学院	Provincial		Guangzhou
Zhongkai University of Agriculture and Engineering	仲恺农业工程学院	Provincial		Guangzhou
Guangdong University of Finance	广东金融学院	Provincial		Guangzhou
Guangdong University of Petrochemical Technology	广东石油化工学院	Provincial		Maoming
Dongguan University of Technology	东莞理工学院	Provincial		Dongguan
Foshan University	佛山科学技术学院	Provincial		Foshan
Guangdong Peizheng College	广州培正学院	Private		Guangzhou
Neusoft Institute Guangdong	广东东软学院	Private		Foshan
Guangzhou College of Commerce	广州商学院	Private		Guangzhou
Guangzhou College of Technology and Business	广州工商学院	Private		Guangzhou
Guangdong University of Science and Technology	广东科技学院	Private		Dongguan
Guangdong Polytechnic College	广东理工学院	Private		Zhaoqing
City College, Dongguan University of Technology	东莞理工学院城市学院	Private		Dongguan
Guangdong Technion-Israel Institute of Technology	广东以色列理工学院	Sino-foreign		Shantou

== Three-year colleges ==
- Guangdong Institute of Arts and Sciences
- Guangdong Nanhua Vocational College of Industry and Commerce
- Shenzhen Institute of Information Technology
- Shenzhen Polytechnic
