= List of awards and honours received by Daisaku Ikeda =

Daisaku Ikeda (1928–2023), a Japanese Buddhist philosopher, educator, author and nuclear disarmament advocate, received many honors around the world. At the time of his death, he was president of Soka Gakkai International and honorary president of Soka Gakkai. During his lifetime, he received more than 800 honorary citizenships, including 51 from Italian municipalities, and was conferred more than 405 academic honors.

The University Council decision to grant him an honorary degree by Federal University of Minas Gerais lost effect, because conferral did not take place before his passing.

== Academic honours ==
Number	Country	Institution	Title conferred	Place and date
1	USSR	Moscow State University	honorary doctorate	May 1975
2	Peru	National University of San Marcos	honorary professorship	April 1981
3	Bulgaria	Sofia University	honorary doctorate	May 1981
4	China	Peking University	honorary professorship	June 1984
5	China	Fudan University	honorary professorship	June 1984
6	Dominican Republic	Autonomous University of Santo Domingo	honorary professorship	February 1987
7	Argentina	University of Buenos Aires	honorary doctorate	March 1990
8	Mexico	University of Guanajuato	honorary doctorate	March 1990
9	China	Wuhan University	honorary professorship	November 1990
10	Macau	University of Macau	honorary professorship	January 1991
11	Philippines	University of the Philippines	honorary doctor of laws	April 1991
12	Argentina	University of Palermo (Buenos Aires)	honorary doctorate	May 1991
13	Hong Kong	Chinese University of Hong Kong	distinguished visiting professor	January 1992
14	Turkey	Ankara University	honorary doctorate of social science	June 1992
15	China	Chinese Academy of Social Sciences	honorary research professor	October 1992
16	Kenya	University of Nairobi	honorary doctorate of letters	December 1992
17	Brazil	Federal University of Rio de Janeiro	honorary doctorate	February 1993
18	Argentina	National University of Lomas de Zamora	honorary doctorate	February 1993
19	Argentina	National University of Lomas de Zamora	honorary professorship, faculty of law	February 1993
20	Argentina	National University of Córdoba	honorary professorship	February 1993
21	Paraguay	National University of Asunción	honorary doctorate of philosophy	February 1993
22	Brazil	University of São Paulo	honorary professor	February 1993
23	Brazil	Federal University of Paraná	honorary doctorate	March 1993
24	Bolivia	Del Valle University	honorary doctorate	March 1993
25	China	Shenzhen University	honorary professorship	November 1993
26	China	Xinjiang Museum	honorary professorship	January 1994
27	Russia	International University in Moscow	honorary doctorate	May 1994
28	Italy	University of Bologna	honorary doctorate	June 1994
29	United Kingdom	University of Glasgow	honorary doctorate	June 1994
30	China	Xinjiang University	honorary professorship	August 1994
31	China	Xiamen University	honorary professorship	November 1994
32	South Africa	University of the North	honorary doctorate of education	September 1995
33	Nepal	Tribhuvan University	honorary doctorate of letters	November 1995
34	Macau	University of Macau	honorary doctorate of social sciences	November 1995
35	Hong Kong	University of Hong Kong	honorary doctorate of letters	March 1996
36	China	Xinjiang University	honorary president	April 1996
37	United States	University of Denver	honorary doctorate of education	June 1996
38	Cuba	University of Havana	honorary doctorate of letters	June 1996
39	Ghana	University of Ghana	honorary doctorate of law	August 1996
40	Russia	Far Eastern State University	honorary doctorate of international education	November 1996
41	China	Zhongshan (Sun Yat-Sen) University	honorary professorship	November 1996
42	China	Jilin University	honorary professorship	February 1997
43	Philippines	De La Salle University	honorary doctorate of humane letters (international education)	March 1997
44	Sri Lanka	University of Kelaniya	honorary doctorate of letters	May 1997
45	China	Shanghai University	honorary professorship	May 1997
46	China	Inner Mongolia University	honorary professorship	October 1997
47	Mongolia	National University of Mongolia	honorary doctorate of humanities	November 1997
48	Philippines	University of the City of Manila	honorary doctorate of humanities	February 1998
49	Argentina	Universidad de Morón	honorary doctorate	March 1998
50	Russia	Institute for High Energy Physics	honorary doctorate	April 1998
51	Brazil	Rio de Janeiro State University	honorary doctorate	April 1998
52	Republic of Korea	Kyung Hee University	honorary doctorate of philosophy	May 1998
53	Republic of Korea	Chung Cheong College	honorary professorship	July 1998
54	Peru	Ricardo Palma University	honorary doctorate	July 1998
55	Peru	Association of Doctors of Education	honorary doctorate	July 1998
56	China	Yanbian University	honorary professorship	November 1998
57	China	Nankai University	honorary professorship	November 1998
58	Brazil	Northern Paraná University	honorary doctorate	November 1998
59	India	University of Delhi	honorary doctorate of letters	December 1998
60	Argentina	University of Flores	honorary doctorate	January 1999
61	China	Sichuan University	honorary professorship	April 1999
62	Peru	Federico Villarreal National University	honorary doctorate	April 1999
63	Republic of Korea	Jeju National University	honorary doctorate of Korean language and literature	May 1999
64	Bolivia	Private University of Santa Cruz de la Sierra	honorary doctorate	June 1999
65	China	Northeastern University (China)	honorary professorship	July 1999
66	Kyrgyzstan	Institute of Oriental Languages and Cultures, Kyrgyz State Pedagogical University	honorary professorship	August 1999
67	Peru	National University of the Center of Peru	honorary doctorate	September 1999
68	China	Hunan Normal University	honorary professorship	September 1999
69	Argentina	National University of Lomas de Zamora	honorary professorship, faculty of social sciences	October 1999
70	Argentina	National University of Comahue	honorary doctorate	October 1999
71	China	Nanjing University	honorary professorship	December 1999
72	Russia	St. Petersburg State University	honorary doctorate	January 2000
73	United States	University of Delaware	honorary doctorate of humane letters	Tokyo, 16 January 2000
74	United States	Queens College, City University of New York	honorary doctorate of humane letters	January 2000
75	Guam (United States)	University of Guam	honorary doctor of humane letters	January 2000
76	Philippines	Angeles University Foundation	honorary doctorate of humanities	February 2000
77	China	Central University for Nationalities	honorary professorship	February 2000
78	China	Guangdong University of Foreign Studies	honorary professorship	February 2000
79	Argentina	National University of Nordeste	honorary doctorate	February 2000
80	China	Northeast Normal University	honorary doctorate	March 2000
81	Sakha Republic (Russia)	Yakutsk State University	honorary professorship	March 2000
82	El Salvador	Latin American Technical University	honorary doctorate	April 2000
83	China	Inner Mongolia Art Academy	preeminent honorary professor	April 2000
84	India	Sri Sitaramdas Omkarnath Institute of Sanskrit Learning	honorary doctorate (Mahamahopadhyaya)	April 2000
85	Mongolia	Mongolian Institute of Literature and Social Work	honorary rector	May 2000
86	China	Beijing Administrative College	honorary professorship	May 2000
87	China	Yunnan University	honorary professorship	June 2000
88	China	South China Normal University	honorary professorship	August 2000
89	India	Bundelkhand University	honorary doctorate of letters	August 2000
90	Venezuela	University of Zulia	honorary doctorate	September 2000
91	Panama	University of Panama	honorary doctorate	September 2000
92	India	Bundelkhand University	honorary lifetime professor in the Ambedhar School of Social Sciences	October 2000
93	Thailand	Siam University	honorary doctorate of public administration	November 2000
94	Tonga	Tonga Institute of Education and Tong Tonga Institute of Schinece and Technology	honorary professorship of education	November 2000
95	Australia	University of Sydney	honorary doctorate of letters	24 November 2000
96	Malaysia	Putra University, Malaysia	honorary doctorate of letters	November 2000
97	Hong Kong	Chinese University of Hong Kong	honorary doctorate of social science	7 December 2000
98	Mongolia	Mongolian University of Arts and Culture	honorary doctorate	December 2000
99	India	Purvanchal University	honorary doctorate of letters	January 2001
100	China	Guangdong Province Academy of Social Sciences	honorary professorship	February 2001
101	China	Northwest University	honorary professorship	April 2001
102	China	Anhui University	honorary professorship	April 2001
103	Puerto Rico	Carlos Albizu University	honorary doctorate of humane letters in behavioral sciences	May 2001
104	Mongolia	Kharakhorum University	honorary doctorate	May 2001
105	China	Fujian Normal University	honorary professorship	June 2001
106	China	Huaqiao University	honorary professorship	June 2001
107	China	Jinan University	honorary professorship	July 2001
108	Commonwealth of the Northern Mariana Islands (United States)	Northern Marianas College	honorary professorship	July 2001
109	China	Soochow University	honorary professorship	October 2001
110	China	Liaoning Normal University	honorary professor	October 2001
111	Philippines	University of Southern Philippines Foundation	honorary doctorate of humanities	October 2001
112	China	Guangzhou University	honorary professorship	November 2001
113	Republic of Korea	Gyeongju University	honorary professorship	December 2001
114	Republic of Korea	Changwon National University	honorary doctorate of education	December 2001
115	Kazakhstan	International Kazakh-Turkish University	honorary professorship	December 2001
116	Dominican Republic	Universidad Tecnológica de Santiago	honorary doctorate	February 2002
117	Uzbekistan	National Institute of Arts and Design (Uzbekistan)	honorary professorship	February 2002
118	China	Liaoning Academy of Social Sciences	senior research professor	March 2002
119	Philippines	Gregorio Araneta University Foundation	honorary doctorate of humanities	March 2002
120	Cambodia	Royal University of Phnom Penh	honorary professorship	March 2002
121	China	Liaoning University	honorary professorship	April 2002
122	United States	Morehouse College	honorary doctorate of humane letters	April 2002
123	China	Qingdao University	honorary professorship	April 2002
124	India	Chhatrapati Shahu Ji Maharaj University	honorary doctorate of letters	April 2002
125	Kenya	Kenyatta University	honorary doctorate of humane letters	May 2002
126	China	Heilongjiang Academy of Social Sciences	honorary professorship	May 2002
127	Russia	Moscow State University	honorary professorship	June 2002
128	China	Nanjing Normal University	honorary professorship	June 2002
129	Republic of Korea	Sorabol College	honorary professorship	June 2002
130	India	Himachal Pradesh University	honorary doctorate of literature	August 2002
131	China	Renmin University of China	honorary professorship	September 2002
132	China	University of Science and Technology of China	honorary professorship	October 2002
133	China	Zhejiang University	honorary professorship	November 2002
134	Mongolia	Shihihutung Law School	honorary doctorate	November 2002
135	Ukraine	Kyiv National University of Trade and Economics (KNUTE)	honorary doctorate	November 2002
136	Republic of Korea	Dong-A University	honorary doctorate of philosophy	December 2002
137	China	Shanghai International Studies University	honorary professorship	December 2002
138	China	Shanghai Academy of Social Sciences	honorary professorship	December 2002
139	India	Bharathidasan University	honorary doctorate of literature	January 2003
140	Peru	National University of Piura	honorary doctorate	February 2003
141	Taiwan	Chinese Culture University	honorary doctorate of philosophy	March 2003
142	China	Dalian University of Foreign Languages	honorary professorship	April 2003
143	Paraguay	Columbia University of Paraguay	honorary doctorate of sociology	April 2003
144	Peru	Jorge Basadre Grohmann National University	honorary doctorate	September 2003
145	China	Northwest Normal University	honorary professorship	October 2003
146	Republic of Korea	Gwangju Women's University	honorary professorship	October 2003
147	China	Shanghai Jiao Tong University	honorary professorship	October 2003
148	United States	Chapman University	honorary doctorate of humane letters	December 2003
149	China	Zhaoqing University	honorary professorship	December 2003
150	Sakha Republic (Russia)	Arctic State Institute of Culture and Arts	honorary professorship	January 2004
151	India	Rabindra Bharati University	honorary doctorate of literature	February 2004
152	United States	Mineral Area College	honorary professorship of humanities	February 2004
153	China	National Prosecutors College	honorary professorship	March 2004
154	Taiwan	National Pingtung University	honorary doctorate of agricultural sciences	March 2004
155	Republic of Buryatia (Russia)	Buryat State University	honorary professorship	April 2004
156	Brazil	Londrina State University	honorary doctorate	April 2003
157	Bolivia	University of San Francisco Xavier of Chuquisaca	honorary doctorate	May 2004
158	China	China University of Petroleum	honorary professorship	May 2004
159	Philippines	Capitol University	honorary doctorate of humanities	June 2004
160	China	Sanda University	honorary professorship	June 2004
161	Jordan	University of Jordan	honorary doctorate of humane letters	July 2004
162	Mexico	University of Guadalajara	honorary doctorate	September 2004
163	China	Fujian Academy of Social Sciences	honorary professorship	September 2004
164	China	Changchun University	honorary professorship	October 2004
165	China	Qufu Normal University	honorary professorship	October 2004
166	Kyrgyzstan	Osh State University	honorary professorship	November 2004
167	Republic of Korea	Paekche Institute of the Arts	honorary professorship	November 2004
168	Mongolia	Otgontenger University	honorary doctorate	December 2004
169	Commonwealth of the Northern Mariana Islands (United States)	Northern Marianas College	honorary president	January 2005
170	Peru	Enrique Guzman y Valle National University of Education	honorary doctorate	January 2005
171	Belarus	Minsk State Linguistic University	honorary professorship	February 2005
172	Philippines	Batangas State University	honorary doctorate of pedagogy	March 2005
173	China	Shanghai University of Finance and Economics	professor emeritus of humanities	April 2005
174	Paraguay	National University of Itapua	honorary doctorate	April 2005
175	China	Beijing Language and Culture University	honorary professorship	May 2005
176	Brazil	Cornélio Procópio College of Philosophy, Science, and Letters	honorary doctorate	May 2005
177	China	Huazhong Normal University	honorary professorship	June 2005
178	China	Guangxi Normal University	honorary professorship	July 2005
179	Mongolia	Mongolian Academy of Sciences Institute of Philosophy, Sociology and Law	honorary professorship, philosophy	September 2005
180	Vietnam	Vietnam National University, Hanoi	honorary doctorate	September 2005
181	China	East China University of Science and Technology	honorary professorship	October 2005
182	Serbia and Montenegro	Braca Karic University	honorary doctorate	October 2005
183	Russia	Academy of Security, Defense, and Law Enforcement	honorary professorship	December 2005
184	India	Symbiosis International Educational Centre (Deemed University)	honorary doctorate of literature	December 2005
185	Russia	Ural State University	honorary doctorate	January 2006
186	Laos	National University of Laos	honorary professorship of humanities	February 2006
187	Philippines	Pampanga Agricultural College	honorary doctorate of humanities	March 2006
188	China	Hunan University	honorary professorship	April 2006
189	Ukraine	National Technical University of Ukraine ("KPI")	honorary doctorate	April 2006
190	China	East China Normal University	honorary professorship	May 2006
191	China	Nanjing Arts Institute	honorary professorship	May 2006
192	India	Visva-Bharati	honorary doctorate of literature	May 2006
193	China	Southwest University of Political Science and Law	honorary professor	June 2006
194	United States	Southern Illinois University Carbondale	honorary doctorate of humane letters	June 2006
195	United States	Los Angeles Southwest College	honorary professorship	June 2006
196	China	Shaoguan University	honorary professorship	June 2006
197	Republic of Korea	Dong Shin University	honorary doctorate of public administration	June 2006
198	Thailand	Maejo University	honorary doctorate of administration	July 2006
199	Brazil	Catholic College of Economic Science of Bahia	honorary doctorate	September 2006
200	China	Beijing Normal University	honorary professorship	October 2006
201	Philippines	University of Rizal System	honorary doctorate of humanities	24 November 2006
202	China	Dalian University of Technology	honorary professorship	8 December 2006
203	Republic of Korea	Dongju College	honorary professorship	6 February 2007
204	China	Guizhou University	honorary professor	26 February 2007
205	Russia	Baikal National University of Economics and Law	honorary professorship	13 March 2007
206	Venezuela	Rafael Belloso Chacin University	honorary doctorate	20 March 2007
207	Venezuela	Santa María University	honorary doctorate of law	20 March 2007
208	Italy	University of Palermo	honorary doctorate in communication sciences	23 March 2007
209	Brazil	Brazilian Academy of Philosophy	honorary doctorate	2 April 2007
210	United States	University of Wisconsin–Milwaukee	honorary doctorate of humane letters	17 April 2007
211	China	Harbin Engineering University	honorary professorship	18 April 2007
212	Brazil	Federal University of Mato Grosso do Sul	honorary doctorate	29 April 2007
213	China	Tianjin Academy of Social Sciences	honorary professor	5 May 2007
214	Taiwan	Southern Taiwan University of Technology	honorary doctorate of engineering	28 May 2007
215	Russia	Russian State University for the Humanities	honorary doctorate	31 May 2007
216	Peru	National University of Santa (La Universidad Nacional del Santa)	honorary doctorate	23 June 2007
217	Sakha Republic (Russia)	The Yakut State Agricultural Academy	honorary professorship	4 July 2007
218	Russia	Far Eastern State Technical University	honorary professorship	9 July 2007
219	Philippines	University of Southeastern Philippines	honorary doctorate of education	13 September 2007
220	China	Shaanxi Normal University	honorary professor	6 October 2007
221	Mexico	University of Humanistic Integration	honorary doctorate of human sciences	8 October 2007
222	Brazil	Ingá University (UNINGÁ, Centro Universitário Ingá)	honorary professorship	10 October 2007
223	China	China Youth University for Political Sciences	honorary professorship	21 October 2007
224	Mongolia	Mongolian State University of Education	honorary doctorate	24 October 2007
225	China	Wenzhou Medical College	honorary professor	30 January 2008
226	China	Shanghai Normal University	honorary professorship	17 December 2007
227	Dominican Republic	Autonomous University of Santo Domingo	honorary doctorate	19 January 2008
228	Taiwan	National Yunlin University of Science and Technology	honorary doctorate of management	21 January 2008
229	Philippines	Laguna State Polytechnic University	honorary doctorate of philosophy in humanities	26 January 2008
230	China	Hunan University of Science and Technology	honorary professorship	1 March 2008
231	Kyrgyz Republic	I. Arabaev Kyrgyz State University	honorary doctorate	21 March 2008
232	China	Jiaying University	honorary professorship	31 March 2008
233	Russia	Tula Lev Tolstoy State Pedagogical University	honorary professorship	2 April 2008
234	China	Hebei University	honorary professor	16 April 2008
235	China	Yan'an University	honorary professorship	4 May 2008
236	China	Liaodong University	lifetime honorary professor	30 May 2008
237	China	Changchun University of Technology	honorary professor	2 June 2008
238	Brazil	Centro Universitário de Goiás	honorary doctorate	17 June 2008
239	Brazil	Centro Universitário Ítalo Brasileiro	honorary doctorate	20 June 2008
240	Philippines	Benguet State University	honorary doctorate of humanities	10 July 2008
241	Taiwan	Chongyou Institute of Technology	honorary professor	22 July 2008
242	Taiwan	Tainan University of Technology	honorary professor	24 July 2008
243	Philippines	Ifugao State College of Agriculture and Forestry	hon doc of education in ancient learning, culture and world peace	Sep 2008
244	Philippines	Universidad de Manila	hon doc of humanities	Oct 2008
245	Mongolia	Mongolian University of Science and Technology	honorary doctor	Oct 2008
246	China	Dalian University	hon prof	Dec 2008
247	Uzbekistan	Uzbekistan State Institute of Arts and Culture (Tashkent State Institute of Culture)	honorary doctorate	Jan 2009
248	Malaysia	Open University Malaysia	hon doc of arts (humanities)	Feb 2009
249	Santa Cruz, Bolivia	University of Aquino-Bolivia (Udabol)	hon doc	Mar 2009
250	Denmark	University College South	honorary doctorate	21 March 2009
251	Republic of Korea	Korea Maritime University	University Professor	2 April 2009
252	Kyrgyzstan	Issyk-Kul State University	hon prof	Apr 2009
253	China	Fujian Agriculture and Forestry University	honorary professor	17 April 2009
254	China	Henan Normal University	honorary professor	April 2009
255	Northern Ireland, UK	Queen's University Belfast	hon doc of laws	May 2009
256	China	Xinjiang University of Finance and Economics	honorary professor	May 2009
257	Philippines	Southern Luzon State University	hon doc of humanities	Jun 2009
258	Brazil	Federal University of Rondônia	hon doc	Jul 2009
259	Republic of Korea	Hongik University	hon doc of literature	Sep 2009
260	Macau, China	Asia International Open University (Macau)	honorary doctorate of philosophy	Sep 2009
261	Brazil	Maranhão School of Government	honorary professorship	Sep 2009
262	Brazil	Silva e Souza Integrated College	honorary doctorate of architecture and urban engineering	Sep 2009
263	Indonesia	Universitas Indonesia	Honorary Doctorate in Philosophy and Peace	Soka University, 10 October 2009
264	China	Zhongkai University of Agriculture and Engineering	honorary professor	Oct 2009
265	China	Dalian Polytechnic University	honorary professorship	Oct 2009
266	Sakha Republic, Russia	Yakutsk Teacher-training College No.1	hon prof	Oct 2009
267	China	Southwest Jiaotong University	honorary professor	Nov 2009
268	China	Xi'an University of Technology	honorary professor	Nov 2009
269	China	Ningxia University	lifetime honorary professor	Nov 2009
270	Taiwan	Yu Da University	honorary professor	Dec 2009
271	Mexico	Enrique Díaz de León University	hon doc	Dec 2009
272	China	Xi'an Peihua University	honorary professor	Dec 2009
273	Guam, US	Guam Community College	honorary professor	January 2010
274	China	Anhui University of Science and Technology	honorary professor	January 2010
275	Uzbekistan	Institute of Fine Arts, Uzbeki Academy of Sciences	honorary doctorate	Feb 2010
276	China	Xi'an International University	honorary professor	Feb 2010
277	China	Guangdong University of Business Studies	honorary professor	Mar 2010
278	Aragua, Venezuela	Bicentennial University of Aragua	hon doc of education	Mar 2010
279	Aragua, Venezuela	Bicentennial University of Aragua	hon prof	Mar 2010
280	China	Xi'an Jiaotong University	honorary professor	Mar 2010
281	Philippines	Ramon Magsaysay Technological University	centennial hon prof	Mar 2010
282	Armenia	Yerevan State Academy of Fine Arts and Artists	honorary doctorate	Japan, 2 April 2010
283	Sichuan, China	Sichuan Academy of Social Sciences	honorary professor	Apr 2010
284	Xinjiang, China	Xinjiang Medical University	honorary professor	Apr 2010
285	Guangxi, China	Guangxi Arts Institute	lifetime honorary professor	Apr 2010
286	Zhejiang, China	Shaoxing University	honorary professor	Apr 2010
287	Canada	Université Laval	honorary doctorate of education	4 May 2010
288	Beijing, China	Tsinghua University	honorary professor	May 2010
289	Beijing, China	Beijing City University	honorary professor	May 2010
290	Zhejiang, China	Ningbo University	honorary professor	June 2010
291	Zhejiang, China	Zhejiang Ocean University	honorary professor	June 2010
292	Virginia, US	George Mason University	hon doc of humane letters	July 2010
293	New Taipei, Taiwan	National Taiwan University of Arts	honorary professor	July 2010
294	Kaohsiung, Taiwan	National University of Kaohsiung	honorary professor	July 2010
295	Malaysia	University of Malaya	honorary doctorate of humanities	2 August 2010
296	Osh, Kyrgyzstan	Osh Humanitarian Pedagogical Institute	honorary professor	August 2010
297	Osh, Kyrgyzstan	Osh Agricultural Institute	honorary professor	August 2010
298	Chile	Universidad Pedro de Valdivia	honorary doctorate	Soka University, 30 August 2010
299	Philippines	University of Southern Mindanao	honorary doctorate of humanities	9 October 2010
300	United States	University of Massachusetts Boston	honorary degree	Shinjuku, Tokyo, 18 November 2010
301	Amazonas, Brazil	Federal Institute of Education, Science and Technology of Amazonas	honorary doctorate	November 2010
302	Liaoning, China	Dalian Maritime University	honorary professor	December 2010
303	São_Paulo, Brazil	São Paulo Metropolitan University	honorary professor	December 2010
304	Mato Grosso, Brazil	Federal University of Mato Grosso	hon doc	December 2010
305	Yunlin County, Taiwan	National Huwei University of Science and Technology	honorary doctor of engineering	December 2010
306	South Chungcheong, Republic of Korea	Konyang University	hon doc of business administration	December 2010
307	Macau	Macao Polytechnic Institute	honorary professor	January 2011
308	Bishkek, Kyrgyzstan	Kyrgyz-Russian Academy of Education	hon prof	March 2011
309	Taipa, Macau	Macau University of Science and Technology	honorary professor	May 2011
310	Hainan, China	Hainan Normal University	honorary professor	May 2011
311	North Chungcheong, Republic of Korea	Chungju National University	hon doc of business administration	July 2011
312	Pangasinan, Philippines	Pangasinan State University	honoris causa	July 2011
313	Busan, Republic of Korea	Pukyong National University	hon doc of international and area studies	September 2011
314	Lusaka, Zambia	University of Zambia	honorary doctor of laws	September 2011
315	Nueva Ecija, Philippines	Central Luzon State University	hon lifetime prof	October 2011
316	Jiangxi, China	Jinggangshan University	honorary professor	October 2011
317	UK	University of Buckingham	Honorary Doctorate of Literature	25 October 2011
318	Xiamen, Fujian, China	Jimei University	Honorary Professor	9 November 2011
319	Moscow, Russia	Russian State University of Trade and Economics	hon doc	November 2011
320	Tashkent, Uzbekistan	Termez State University	honorary professor	December 2011
321	Beijing, China	Central University of Finance and Economics	honorary professor	January 2012
322	Bishkek, Kyrgyzstan	Bishkek Humanities University	honorary doctorate	March 2012
323	Bataan, Philippines	Bataan Peninsula State University	honorary doctor	March 2012
324	Santa Cruz, Bolivia	Private Technological University of Santa Cruz (Utepsa)	hon doc	March 2012
325	Taipei, Taiwan	Taipei College of Maritime Technology	honorary professor	April 2012
326	Lima, Peru	Technological University of Peru	honorary doctorate	May 2012
327	Lima, Peru	Technological University of Peru	professor emeritus, Faculty of Law, Political Science and International Relations	May 2012
328	Guizhou, China	Guizhou Normal University	honorary professor	May 2012
329	Taipei, Taiwan	National Taiwan Normal University, College of Fine Arts	honorary professor	June 2012
330	Liaoning, China	Bohai University	honorary professor	June 2012
331	Ontario, Canada	University of Guelph	hon doc of laws	September 2012
332	Paraná, Brazil	Dom Bosco College of Higher Education	honorary doctorate	September 2012
333	Almaty, Kazakhstan	Al-Farabi Kazakh National University	hon prof	October 2012
334	Táchira, Venezuela	National Experimental University of Táchira	hon doc	28 November 2012
335	Pando, Bolivia	La Universidad Amazónica de Pando (Amazonian University of Pando)	honorary doctorate	February 2013
336	Osh, Kyrgyzstan	Kyrgyz-Chinese Humanitarian Economic Institute	hon prof	February 2013
337	Nueva Vizcaya, Philippines	Nueva Vizcaya State University	hon doc of humanities	March 2013
338	South Africa	University of KwaZulu-Natal	Doctor of Social Science honoris causa	Apr 2013
339	Bangkok, Thailand	Thammasat University	hon doc of philosophy	August 2013
340	Armenia	Yerevan State University	honorary doctor	September 2013
341	Aklan, Philippines	Aklan State University	hon doc of humanities	October 2013
342	Liaoning, China	Dalian Art College	honorary professor	October 2013
343	Peru	Universidad Peruana de las Americas/Peruvian University of the Americas	hon doc	November 2013
344	Ulan Bator, Mongolia	University of the Humanities	hon doc of humanities	November 2013
345	Moscow, Russia	Pushkin State Russian Language Institute	hon doc	November 2013
346	Córdoba, Argentina	National University of Villa María	honorary professor extraordinaire	February 2014
347	Jharkhand, India	Satyendra Narayan Sinha Institute of Business Management	hon prof	March 2014
348	Isabel, Philippines	Isabela State University	hon doc of humanities	April 2014
349	Tianjin, China	Tianjin Foreign Studies University	honorary professor	May 2014
350	Lima, Peru	National University of Engineering	honorary doctorate	May 2014
351	Heilongjiang, China	Harbin Normal University	honorary professor	July 2014
352	Sakha Republic, Russia	Yakutsk Teacher-training College	hon prof	September 2014
353	Manila, The Philippines	University of the East	honorary doctor of humanities	September 2014
354	China	Nanjing University of Science and Technology	honorary professorship	October 2014
355	Russia	People's Friendship University of Russia	honorary doctorate	November 2014
356	Kyrgyzstan	Kyrgyz-Russian Slavic University	honorary doctorate	February 2015
357	India	Madurai Institute of Social Sciences	honorary professor, Social Sciences	April 2015
358	South Korea (Republic of Korea)	University of North Korean Studies	honorary chair professor	May 2015
359	China	Foshan University	honorary professor	May 2015
360	Bolivia	Autonomous University of Beni (Spanish: Universidad Autónoma del Beni)	honorary doctorate	June 2015
361	Brazil	Castelo Branco University	honorary doctorate	June 2015
362	South Korea (Republic of Korea)	Kyungnam University	honorary doctorate of philosophy in education	September 2015
363	Taiwan (Republic of China)	Chienkuo Technology University	honorary lifetime professor	November 2015
364	India	Jagran Lakecity University	honorary doctorate of humane letters	November 2015
365	Bhopal, India	Barkatullah University	honorary doctorate of letters	January 2016
366	Kyrgyzstan	Uzgen Institute of Technology and Education, Osh Technological University (Uzgen)	honorary doctorate	March 2016
367	Argentina	National University of Tucumán	honorary doctorate	August 2016
368	United States	DePaul University	honorary doctorate of Humane Letters	December 2016
369	Brazil	Universidade Federal do Acre	"honoris causa"	March 2017
370	China	Hunan University of Technology	honorary professor	22 June 2017
371	Peru	National University of San Marcos	honorary doctorate	21 August 2017
372	Brazil	Valença College of Higher Education (Centro de Ensino Superior de Valença)	honorary doctorate	24 August 2017
373	Paraguay	Nihon Gakko University (Universidad Nihon Gakko)	honorary doctorate of education	10 October 2017
374	China	Hubei University	honorary professor	9 November 2017
375	Spain	University of Alcalá	honorary doctorate of education	25 January 2018
376	Argentina	University of Cuenca del Plata	honorary doctorate	24 February 2018
377	Taiwan (Republic of China)	Chihlee University of Technology	honorary professor	1 March 2018
378	Brazil	Integrated College of Jacarepaguá	honorary professor	3 March 2018
379	Argentina	National University of Tierra del Fuego	honorary doctorate	18 April 2018
380	Brazil	Federal University of Paraíba	honorary doctorate	13 June 2018
381	Philippines	Cagayan State University	honorary doctorate of humane letters	7 Feb 2018
382	Taiwan (China)	Chung Hua University	honorary professor	30 July 2018
383	China	Beijing Film Academy	honorary professor	23 October 2018
384	China	Huaiyin Normal University	honorary professor	29 October 2018
385	Argentina	Eastern University (Universidad del Este de Argentina, UDE)	honorary doctorate	31 October 2018
386	Venezuela	Central University of Venezuela (Universidad Central de Venezuela)	honorary doctorate	11 June 2019
387	Brazil	Federal University of Sergipe	honorary doctorate	August 2019
388	Brazil	Federal University of Amazonas	honorary doctorate	21 August 2019
389	Brazil	Federal Rural University of Pernambuco	honorary doctorate	23 August 2019
390	Argentina	National University of Jujuy (UNJu)	honorary professor in the Faculty of Humanities	15 September 2019
391	India	Manav Rachna University	honorary doctorate in philosophy	23 September 2019
392	Uzbekistan	National University of Uzbekistan	honorary doctorate	8 November 2019
393	China	Changchun Normal University	honorary professor	7 November 2019
394	India	Jaipur National University	honorary doctorate	21 November 2019
395	India	Xavier University, Bhubaneswar, Xavier School of Sustainability	honorary doctorate	22 November 2019
396	The Philippines	Central Mindanao University	honorary doctorate	27 February 2020
397	Brazil	Federal University of Piauí	honorary doctorate of philosophy	17 November 2020
398	Brazil	Federal University of Pernambuco	honorary doctorate	4 December 2021
399	India	Birsa Agricultural University	honorary professorship	21 April 2022
400	Republic of Korea	Chungbuk National University	honorary doctor of education	28 April 2022
401	USA	University of Minnesota	honorary doctor of humane letters	14 May 2022
403	Seoul, South Korea	Hankuk University of Foreign Studies (HUFS)	honorary doctorate in philosophy	May 2023
404	Argentina	National University of Misiones	honorary doctor with special mention of merit	June 2023
405	Argentina	University of Salta	honorary doctor	June 2023405
406	Heibei, China	Hebei Foreign Studies University	lifetime honorary professor	July 2023
407	Santa Cruz de la Sierra, Bolivia	University of Development and Innovation (Universidad para el Desarrollo y la Innovación)	honorary doctorate	July 2023
408	Selangor, Malaysia	New Era University College	honorary doctorate	August 2023
409	Asunción, Paraguay	Ibero-American University of Paraguay	honorary doctorate	December 2023

== Awards and honours ==
- Australia: Gold Medal for Human Rights from the Sydney Peace Foundation (2009)
- Brazil: Brazilian Academy of Letters (ABL) corresponding occupant of Chair No. 14 (1992)
- Brazil: Medalha D. André Arcoverde (D. André Arcoverde Medal) (2017)
- Brazil: Order of Educational Merit in the Grade of Officer (Ordem Nacional do Mérito Educativo no grau Grande Oficial)
- Brazil: Order of the Pine in the Grand Cross Degree, from the State of Paraná (1998)
- China: International Literary Award for Understanding and Friendship from the China Literature Foundation and Chinese Writersʼ Association (2002) and (2003)
- India: Tagore Peace Award (1997)
- India: Jamnalal Bajaj Award for Outstanding Contribution in Promotion of Gandhian Values Outside India by Individuals other than Indian Citizens (2005)
- India: Indology Award for Outstanding Contribution in the Field of Indic Research and Oriental Wisdom (2011)
- Italy: First FIRMA award presented in 2018 "for his lifelong commitment to interreligious dialogue."
- Macedonia: World Prize for Humanism (Macedonian: Светска награда за хуманизам) from the Ohrid Academy of Humanism (2007)
- Philippines: Golden Heart Award from the Knights of Rizal (2012)
- Philippines: Gusi Peace Prize
- Russia: Honorary Foreign Member of the Russian Academy of Arts (2007)
- Russia: Order of Friendship of the Russian Federation (2008)
- Singapore: Wee Kim Wee Gold Award (2017)
- Switzerland: Club of Rome Honorary Member
- United Arab Emirates: International Poet of Peace (2016)
- United Nations: United Nations Peace Medal (1983)
- United States: Rosa Parks Humanitarian Award (1993)
