= Guangdong–Hong Kong–Macao University Alliance =

Inter-university conference

- Abbreviation: GHMUA
- Formation: 15 November 2016; 9 years ago
- Headquarters: Guangzhou, Guangdong, China
- Members: 49 universities
- Website: eao.sysu.edu.cn/ghmua/

Chinese name
- Simplified Chinese: 粤港澳高校联盟
- Traditional Chinese: 粵港澳高校聯盟
Transcriptions
Standard Mandarin
- Hanyu Pinyin: Yuè Gǎng'ào Gāoxiào Liánméng

Guangdong–Hong Kong–Macao University Alliance (GHMUA) is an inter-university conference of 37 universities in Guangdong, Hong Kong, and Macau. It was established on 15 November 2016.

== List of institutions ==
=== Guangdong ===
- Sun Yat-sen University
- South China University of Technology
- South China Normal University
- Jinan University
- South China Agricultural University
- Southern Medical University
- Guangzhou University of Chinese Medicine
- Guangdong University of Technology
- Guangdong University of Foreign Studies
- Shantou University
- Shenzhen University
- Southern University of Science and Technology
- Tsinghua Shenzhen International Graduate School
- Harbin Institute of Technology, Shenzhen
- Beijing Normal University
- Guangzhou University
- Foshan University
- Guangzhou Medical University
- Dongguan University of Technology
- Wuyi University
- Guangdong Ocean University
- Chinese University of Hong Kong, Shenzhen
- Guangdong University of Finance and Economics
- Guangdong University of Petrochemical Technology
- Lingnan Normal University
- Hong Kong University of Science and Technology (Guangzhou)
- Guangdong Pharmaceutical University
- Beijing Normal–Hong Kong Baptist University
- Zhongkai University of Agriculture and Engineering
- Beijing Institute of Technology, Zhuhai
- City University of Hong Kong (Dongguan)
- Shaoguan University
- Zhaoqing University

=== Hong Kong ===
- Chinese University of Hong Kong
- Lingnan University
- University of Hong Kong
- Hong Kong Metropolitan University
- City University of Hong Kong
- Hong Kong University of Science and Technology
- Hong Kong Baptist University
- Hong Kong Polytechnic University
- Education University of Hong Kong

=== Macau ===
- University of Macau
- University of Saint Joseph
- Macao University of Tourism
- City University of Macau
- Macau University of Science and Technology
- Macao Polytechnic University
- Kiang Wu Nursing College of Macau
