= LNU =

LNU may refer to:

== Universities ==
- Leyte Normal University, Tacloban City, Philippines
- Liaoning Normal University, a teacher training university in China
- Lingnan Normal University, Zhanjiang City, Guangdong Province, China
- Linnaeus University, Växjö and Kalmar, Sweden
- University of Luhansk, Ukraine
- University of Lviv, Ukraine

== Other ==
- Fnu Lnu (Last Name Unknown), a placeholder name
- The Norwegian Children and Youth Council (Norwegian: Landsrådet for Norges barne- og ungdomsorganisasjoner), a member of the World Assembly of Youth
- League of Nations Union, a British organisation advocating peace and disarmament
- Lincolnshire Naturalists' Union, a British natural history society formed in 1893.
- Longuda language (ISO 639:lnu), a Niger–Congo language of Nigeria
- Mi'kmaq people or Lnu, a First Nations People of North America
- Robert Atty Bessing Airport (IATA: LNU), Malinau, North Kalimantan, Indonesia
- Sonoma-Lake-Napa Unit, an operational unit of the California Department of Forestry and Fire Protection
- LNU Lightning Complex fires, a group of wildfires in California
