= Wuyi University (Guangdong) =

Public university in Jiangmen, Guangdong, China

Coordinates: 22.5992471°N 113.0858722°E

- 五邑大学 (Chinese)
- Motto: 好学、多思、求实、创新
- Motto in English: Learning, Thinking, Truth-seeking, and Innovating
- Type: Public university
- Established: 1985; 41 years ago
- Affiliations: Guangdong-Hong Kong-Macao University Alliance (GHMUA); Alliance of CDIO
- Chairman: Zhang Kun
- President: Zhang Yunhua
- Faculty: ~1,200 (Sep 2024)
- Administrative staff: ~1,200 (Sep 2024)
- Students: ~22,000 (Sep 2024)
- Undergraduates: ~18,000 (Sep 2024)
- Postgraduates: ~1,400 (Sep 2024)
- Location: Jiangmen, Guangdong, China
- Campus: Downtown, 666,667 square metres
- Website: WYU English Website; WYU Chinese Website

Chinese name
- Simplified Chinese: 五邑大学
- Traditional Chinese: 五邑大學
Transcriptions
Standard Mandarin
- Hanyu Pinyin: Wǔyì Dàxué
Yue: Cantonese
- Jyutping: ng5 jap1 daai6 hok6

Wuyi University (abbreviated as WYU; Chinese: 五邑大学) is a public university based in Jiangmen, Guangdong, China. It is a member of Guangdong–Hong Kong–Macao University Alliance.

Wuyi University ranked 79th in the world for Nature Index 2021 Young Universities (Leading 150 Young Universities) and 130th in China for Nature Index 2023.

== Academics ==
=== Faculties ===
List of schools:

- School of Rail Transportation (轨道交通学院)
- School of Biotechnology and Health Sciences (生物科技与大健康学院)
- School of Economics & Management (经济管理学院)
- School of Textile Materials and Engineering (纺织材料与工程学院)
- School of Politics and Law (政法学院)
- School of Foreign Languages (外国语学院)
- School of General Education (通识教育学院)
- School of Aesthetic Education (美育教育中心)
- Faculty of Intelligent Manufacturing (智能制造学部)

List of departments:

- Chinese Language and Literature Department
- Department of Management Science and Engineering
- Department of Tele-communications and Electronics Engineering
- Department of Computer and Internet Network Engineering
- Department of Information and Control Engineering
- Mathematics and Physics Department
- Mechanics and Electricity Department
- Civil Engineering Department
- Social Science and Art Department
- Physical Education Department

=== Research centres ===
List of research centres:

- Institute for Guangdong Qiaoxiang Studies (广东侨乡文化研究院)
- Research Center of Cyberspace Security and Big Data Technology (网络空间安全与大数据技术研究中心)
- International Healthcare Innovation Institute (Jiangmen) (江门市大健康国际创新研究院)
- Smart Materials Integration Research Lab (SMIR Lab) (智能材料集成研究实验室)
- Big Data and Data Intelligence Application Research Team (大数据与数据智能应用研究团队)

=== Accreditation and memberships ===
Wuyi University is a member of SAP University Alliances.

=== Partner institutions ===
Wuyi University has established partnerships with nearly 50 universities in 14 countries and regions including China, United States, United Kingdom, Germany, France, Canada, Australia, Hong Kong, Macau and South Korea.

Below are the partial list of WYU's institutions partners:

- Australia
  - University of Wollongong
  - Western Sydney University
- Canada
  - McGill University
  - University of British Columbia
- China
  - Tsinghua University
  - Peking University
  - Shanghai Jiao Tong University
  - Zhejiang University
  - Harbin Institute of Technology
  - Southern University of Science and Technology
  - Sun Yat-sen University
  - Shenzhen University
  - Shandong University
  - Lanzhou University
  - South China University of Technology
  - Jinan University
  - Guangdong University of Technology
  - Beijing Jiaotong University
  - Southwest Jiaotong University
  - Central South University
  - Donghua University
  - Southern Medical University
  - Dongguan University of Technology
- France
  - University of Lorraine
  - University of Rennes 1
- Hong Kong
  - Hong Kong University of Science and Technology
  - Hong Kong Polytechnic University
  - Lingnan University
- Germany
  - German Research Centre for Artificial Intelligence (DFKI)
  - Karlsruhe Institute of Technology
  - Anhalt University of Applied Sciences
- Macau
  - University of Macau
  - Macau University of Science and Technology
- South Korea
  - Korea Advanced Institute of Science and Technology
- United Kingdom
  - Durham University
  - Liverpool School of Tropical Medicine
- United States
  - University of Pennsylvania
  - Northwestern University
  - University of Florida
  - Rutgers University
  - University of Wisconsin–Madison
  - Arizona State University
  - Washington State University
  - University of Texas at Arlington
  - Marquette University
  - Howard University

=== Rankings and reputation ===
University rankings

Global – Overall
- CWUR World: 1882 (2024)

National – Overall
- BCUR National: 336 (2024)
- CUAA National: 351 (2024)

==== Nature Index ====
Nature Index tracks the affiliations of high-quality scientific articles and presents research outputs by institution and country on monthly basis.

Year	Rank	Valuer
2021	79	Nature Index 2021 Young Universities (Leading 150 Young Universities)
2022	147	Nature Index - Academic Institutions - China
2023	498	Nature Index - Academic Institutions - Global
2023	130	Nature Index - Academic Institutions - China
2024	487	Nature Index - Academic Institutions - Global
2024	141	Nature Index - Academic Institutions - China

==== Best Chinese Universities Ranking (BCUR) ====
The Best Chinese Universities Ranking (BCUR), compiled by Shanghai Ruanke, is a domestic ranking table of Chinese institutions of higher education.

Year	Rank	Valuer
2022	339	Best Chinese Universities Ranking
2023	343	Best Chinese Universities Ranking
2024	336	Best Chinese Universities Ranking

==== CUAA (Chinese Universities Alumni Association) ====
Universities Ranking of China released by CUAA (Chinese Universities Alumni Association, 中国校友会网) is one of the most foremost domestic university rankings in China.

Year	Rank	Valuer
2020	20	CUAA China Applied University Ranking
2020	174	CUAA China Regional University Ranking
2020	259	CUAA China University Ranking
2021	309	CUAA China University Ranking
2022	334	CUAA China University Ranking
2023	335	CUAA China University Ranking
2024	351	CUAA China University Ranking

==== Center for World University Rankings (CWUR) ====
Center for World University Rankings (CWUR) is a leading consulting organization providing policy advice, strategic insights, and consulting services to governments and universities to improve educational and research outcomes.

Year	Rank	Valuer
2023	1986	CWUR World University Rankings
2024	1882	CWUR World University Rankings

=== Publications ===
- Journal of Wuyi University
