= Guangdong Ocean University =

University in Zhanjiang, China

Coordinates: 21.1455°N 110.3025°E

- 广东海洋大学 (Chinese)
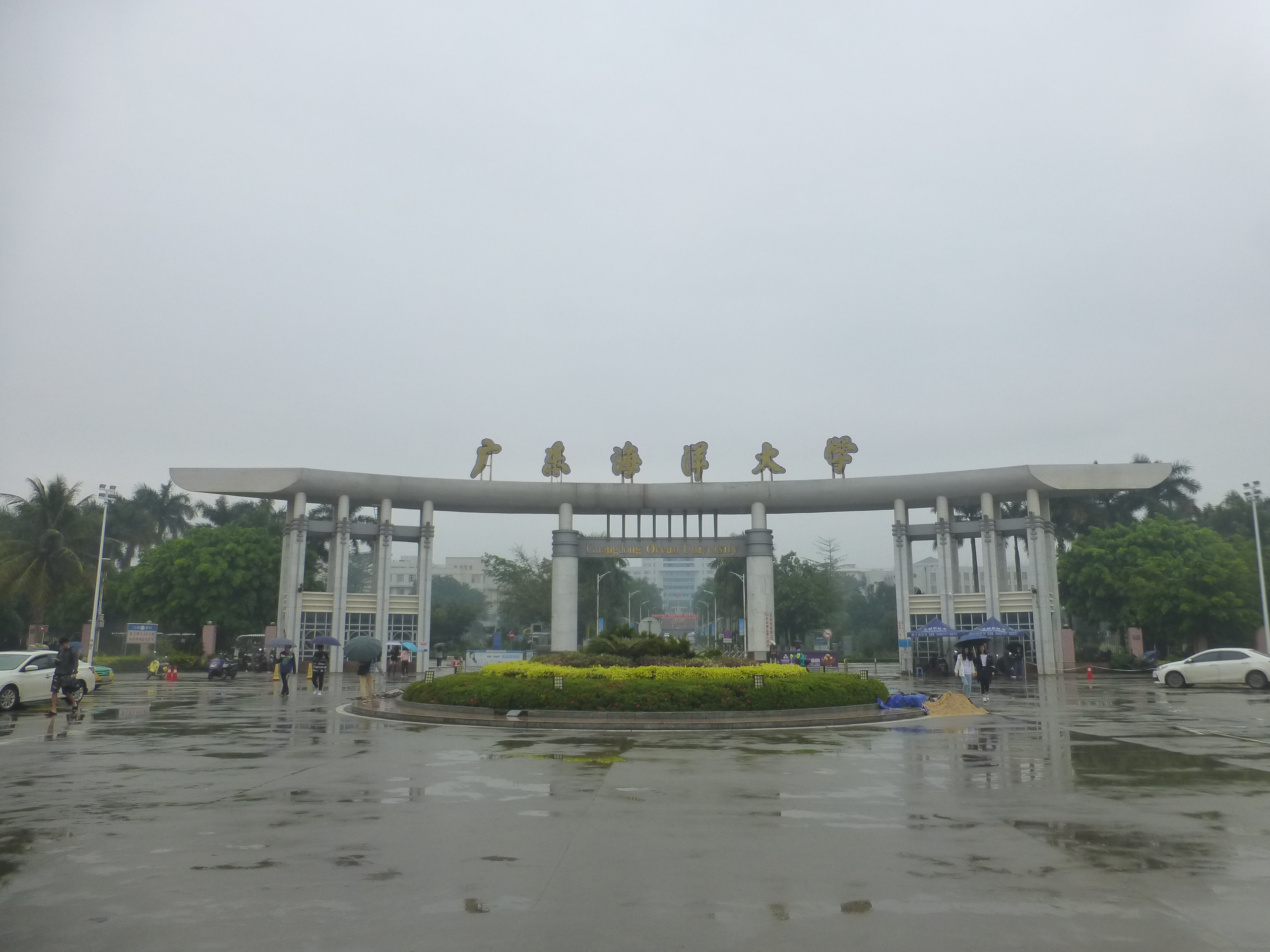
- Type: Public
- Established: 1935; 91 years ago
- Affiliations: Guangdong-Hong Kong-Macao University Alliance (GHMUA)
- Undergraduates: 32,600
- Postgraduates: 9,000
- Location: Zhanjiang, Guangdong Province, China
- Campus: urban
- Website: http://www.gdou.edu.cn/

Chinese name
- Simplified Chinese: 广东海洋大学
- Traditional Chinese: 廣東海洋大學
Transcriptions
Standard Mandarin
- Hanyu Pinyin: Guǎngdōng hǎiyáng dàxué

Guangdong Ocean University (Chinese: 广东海洋大学, GDOU) was established in 1935, providing courses in oceanography and maritime sciences. It is situated in the Zhanjiang City, Guangdong Province, China.

== History ==
Guangdong Ocean University was originally set up as Zhanjiang Ocean University on January 10, 1997. It was merger of the 62-year-old Zhanjiang Fishery College and the 39-year-old Zhanjiang Agricultural Academy. In 1998, the university was granted permission to offer master's degrees and enroll foreign students. In 1999, the university passed the Undergraduate Teaching Qualification Assessment conducted by the Education Ministry of China. In 2003, it passed the Nautical Education and Training Quality System Examination and Authentication certified from the National Maritime Bureau.

In 2001, Zhanjiang Meteorological School with 48 years of history was merged into the Zhanjiang Ocean University giving it a comprehensive depth in Oceanic and Meteorological expertise.

In 2005, Zhanjiang Ocean University was renamed Guangdong Ocean University to better raise its profile as a leading university in oceanic and meteorological sciences.

== Location ==
The university's main campus is in Zhanjiang, Guangdong. It has a total area of 345 hectares, consisting of four campuses with different functions.

The other three campuses are Xiashan Campus, Haibin Campus and Cunjin Campus.

== Administration ==
The university consist of 19 faculties, with 56 undergraduate programs and 15 graduate programs, and a current enrollment of 41,600 local and foreign students.

=== Faculties and Divisions ===
- Faculty of Fishery
- Faculty of Agriculture
- Faculty of Engineering
- Faculty of Foodstuff Technology
- Faculty of Economic Management
- Faculty of Navigation
- Faculty of Information Technology
- Faculty of Software
- Faculty of Sciences
- Faculty of Chinese Literature
- Faculty of Law
- Faculty of Art (with China Chorus)
- Faculty of Foreign Studies
- Faculty of Politics and Executive Studies
- Faculty of Physical Education and Leisure
- Division of Continuing Studies
- Division of Vocational Education
- Cunjin College

== See also ==
- List of universities and colleges in Guangdong
- List of universities in China
