= Guangdong Police College =

Police acadmey in Guangzhou, China

Guangdong Police College (Chinese: 广东警官学院)
- Motto: 忠诚勇毅 博雅致用 (Loyalty, Courage, and Diligence; Broad Knowledge and Practical Application)
- Type: public
- Established: 1949
- Faculty: 311（2025）
- Students: 7532（2025）
- Location: Guangzhou, China: Binjiang Campus: 500 Binjiang East Road, Haizhu District, Guangzhou 23°06′25″N 113°16′56″E; Jiahe Campus: 118 Wenshengzhuang Road, Baiyun District, Guangzhou 23°15′23″N 113°18′04″E
- Website: www.gdppla.edu.cn

The Guangdong Police College or Guangdong Police Academy, formerly known as Guangdong Provincial Public Security Cadre School, is the only undergraduate police educational institution in southern China. Established in November 1949, the school has developed into a college of over 7,000 students, on two campuses in Guangzhou.

== History ==
In November 1949, the Guangdong Provincial Public Security Cadre School was founded in Guangzhou. In 1958, Guangdong Provincial Public Security Cadre School merged with Guangdong Provincial Political and Legal Cadre School, Guangzhou Municipal Public Security School, Guangzhou Municipal Administrative Cadre School and Guangdong Provincial Police Cadre Training Brigade to form the Guangdong Provincial Political and Law Cadre School.

In 1974, regular secondary vocational education was launched in the school. In 1983, the school was reorganized into the "Guangdong Provincial College of Public Security and Judicial Management Cadres", which began offering adult associate degree education. In 1988, the school was renamed "Guangdong Provincial College of Public Security and Judicial Management Cadres".

In 1992, the college was promoted to the "Guangdong Provincial Higher Vocational School of Public Security". In 1998, the Guangdong Provincial People's Police School was merged into the Guangdong Provincial Higher Vocational School of Public Security.

In May 2004, with the approval of the Ministry of Education, the Guangdong Police College was established on the basis of the Guangdong Provincial Higher Vocational School of Public Security. It was a regular higher public security college at the undergraduate level in Guangdong Province and the first public security undergraduate college in South China. In 2008, the college was granted the right to confer bachelor's degrees by the Ministry of Education. In 2010, the college was selected as an "Advanced Collective in National Public Security Education and Training."

In 2021, the college was granted the right to confer master's degrees by the Ministry of Education. In 2022, the college obtained provincial-level qualification for police drone pilot training. Since its establishment, the school has produced over 200,000 graduates for Guangdong, Hainan, and other provinces and cities, and has been honored as the "cradle of police officers in southern China".

== Campus ==
Guangdong Police College has two campuses with the addresses as follows.

- Binjiang Campus: 500 Binjiang East Road, Haizhu District, Guangzhou
- Jiahe Campus: 118 Wenshengzhuang Road, Baiyun District, Guangzhou

It covers a total land area of 560.7 mu, and a building area of 254,600 square meters.

There are three provincial-level research platforms: the Guangdong Provincial Public Security Research Center, the Domestic Security and Social Stability Research Center, and the Guangdong Provincial Public Security Research Base. And there are three provincial-level forensic centers: the Guangdong Tianzheng Forensic Science Center, the Forensic Psychological Testing Technology Center, and the Physical Evidence Identification Center.

== Academics ==
The college undertakes tasks such as training leading cadres of public security organs throughout the province, and training police officers from Hong Kong, Macao and foreign countries. There are 12 disciplines or majors offered by Guangdong Police College, including:

- Criminal Investigation
- Public Security
- Criminal Science and Technology
- Economic Crime Investigation
- Drug Control
- Police Command and Tactics
- Traffic Management Engineering
- Cybersecurity and Law Enforcement
- Computer Science and Technology
- Law
- Public Administration
- Social Work

=== Faculty ===
As of September, 2025, there are 677 staff members, including 311 teachers.

=== Students ===
There are 7,532 students on campus.

=== Accreditation ===
The college is under the supervision of the Guangdong Provincial Public Security Department and the Guangdong Provincial Department of Education.

=== Library ===
The college library has a collection of 895,380 books and 420,000 e-books.

=== Publications ===
The school also hosts the Journal of Political Science and Law (政法学刊), a core journal of the Chinese Academy of Social Sciences.

== See also ==
- List of universities and colleges in Guangdong
- Guangdong
- People's Public Security University of China
