= Yu Da University of Science and Technology =

University in Zaoqiao, Miaoli County, Taiwan

- 育達科技大學
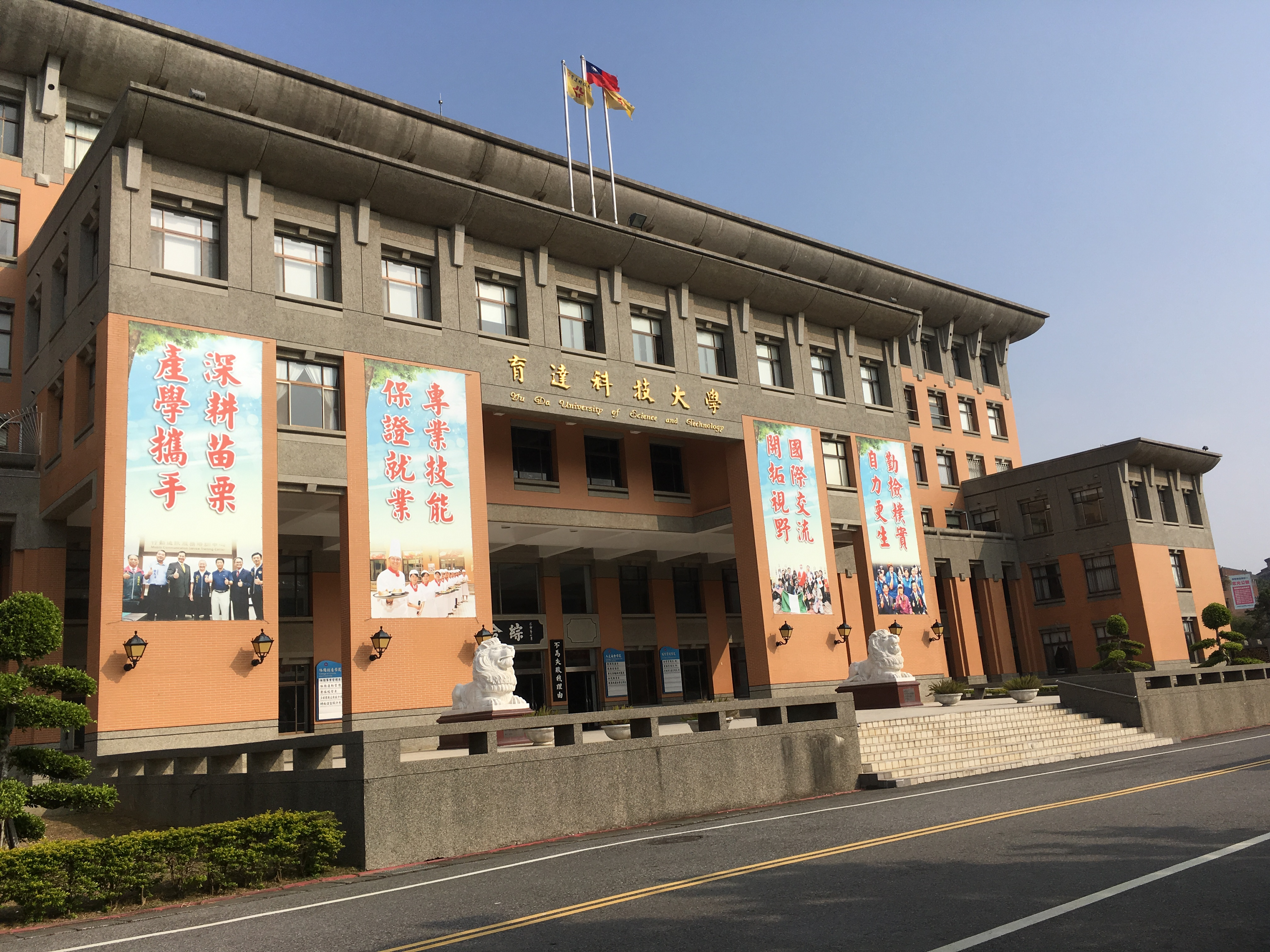
- Former names: Yu Da College of Business
- Type: Private university
- Established: 1999
- President: Leo Huang
- Location: Zaoqiao, Miaoli County, Taiwan; 24.64729°N 120.845151°E
- Website: Official website

Yu Da University of Science and Technology
- Traditional Chinese: 育達科技大學
Transcriptions
Standard Mandarin
- Hanyu Pinyin: Yùdá Kējì Dàxué
Southern Min
- Hokkien POJ: Io̍k-ta̍t Kho-ki Tāi-ha̍k

Yu Da University of Science and Technology (YDU; Chinese: 育達科技大學; Pe̍h-ōe-jī: Io̍k-ta̍t Kho-ki Tāi-ha̍k) is a private university in Zaoqiao Township, Miaoli County, Taiwan.

YDUST offers a range of undergraduate and graduate programs in various fields, including business, engineering, design, tourism, and healthcare. Some of the most popular programs at the university include Information Management, Electronic Engineering, Business Administration, and Industrial Design.

== History ==
YDU was originally established in 1999 as Yu Da College of Business fully funded by Dr. Kwang-Ya Wang and his wife. Dr. Wang was the president of Yu Da High School of Commerce and Home Economics from 1977 to 2010. In August 2009, the school changed its name to Yu Da University after the approval of Ministry of Education.

== Faculties ==
- College of Management
- College of Leisure and Creativity
- College of Finance and Economics
- College of Humanities and Social Sciences

== Transportation ==
The university is accessible within walking distance South West from Tanwen Station of Taiwan Railway.

== See also ==
- List of universities in Taiwan
