= Guangdong Nanhua Vocational College of Industry and Commerce =

Vocational college in Guangzhou, China

Coordinates: 23°04′40″N 113°25′15″E

- 广东南华工商职业学院
- Motto: 求真务实、勤恳好学、健康和谐、儒雅自尊
- Motto in English: Realistic, diligent, studious, healthy, harmonious and elegant self respect
- Type: Public
- Established: 1993; 33 years ago
- President: Ma Xusheng (马栩生)
- Location: Guangzhou, Guangdong, China
- Website: www.nhic.edu.cn

Guangdong Nanhua Vocational College of Industry and Commerce (simplified Chinese: 广东南华工商职业学院; traditional Chinese: 廣東南華工商職業學院; pinyin: Guǎngdōng Nánhuá Gōngshāng Zhíyè Xuéyuàn) is a public vocational college in Guangdong, China.

The college has three campuses (Tianhe Campus, Huangpu Campus and Qingyuan Campus), a combined student body of 20,000 students, 406 faculty members, and over 200,000 living alumni. The university consists of four schools and four departments, with 28 specialties for undergraduates. The university has 44 research institutions and research centres and 50 extracurricular practice bases.

== History ==
Guangdong Nanhua Vocational College of Industry and Commerence was officially founded in 1993.

== Schools and departments ==
- School of Foreign Languages and Trade
- School of Finance and Finance
- School of Information Engineering and Business Management
- School of Architecture and Art Design
- Department of Ideological and Political
- Department of Sports and Art
- Department of Tourism Management
- Department of Law and Public Service

== Campuses ==
=== Tianhe Campus ===
The Tianhe Campus is at the foot of Baiyun Mountain in Tianhe District of Guangzhou.

=== Huangpu Campus ===
The Huangpu Campus is on Changzhou Island, Huangpu District of Guangzhou. It is a part of Guangzhou Higher Education Mega Center.

=== Qingyuan Campus ===
The Qingyuan Campus lies in Qingyuan, Guangdong, with a building area of 307,060-square-metre (3,305,200 sq ft).

== Culture ==
"求真务实、勤恳好学、健康和谐、儒雅自尊" is the motto of the college, meaning realistic, diligent, studious, healthy, harmonious and elegant self respect in English.

== Library ==
There are 0.9257 million items in the library, including 0.6638 million copies of paper documents (books, newspapers and periodicals), 0.2421 million electronic books, 19 thousand and 800 CD-ROMs, and 393 periodicals and 82 newspapers.

== Gallery ==
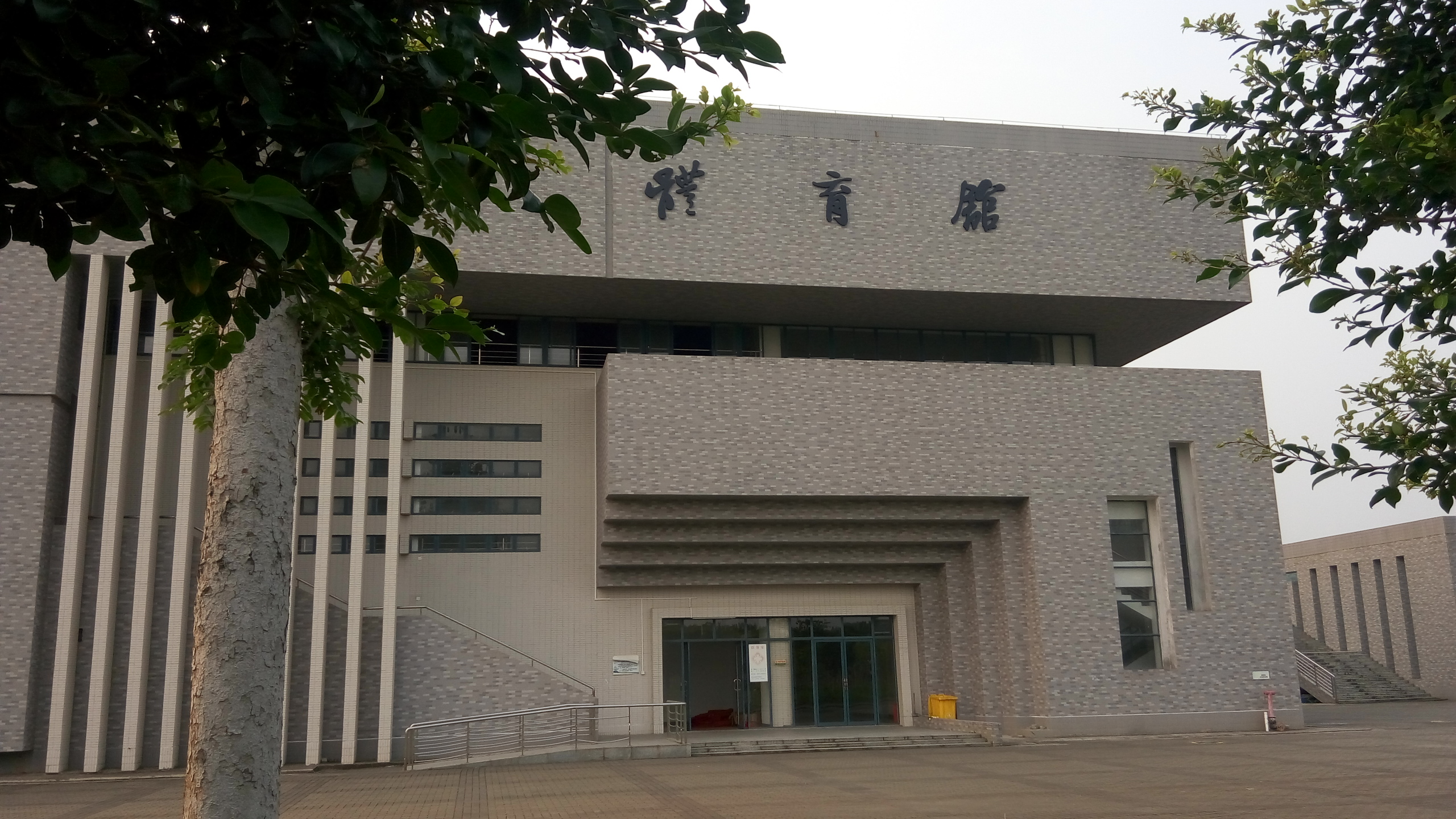
The Gymnasium.

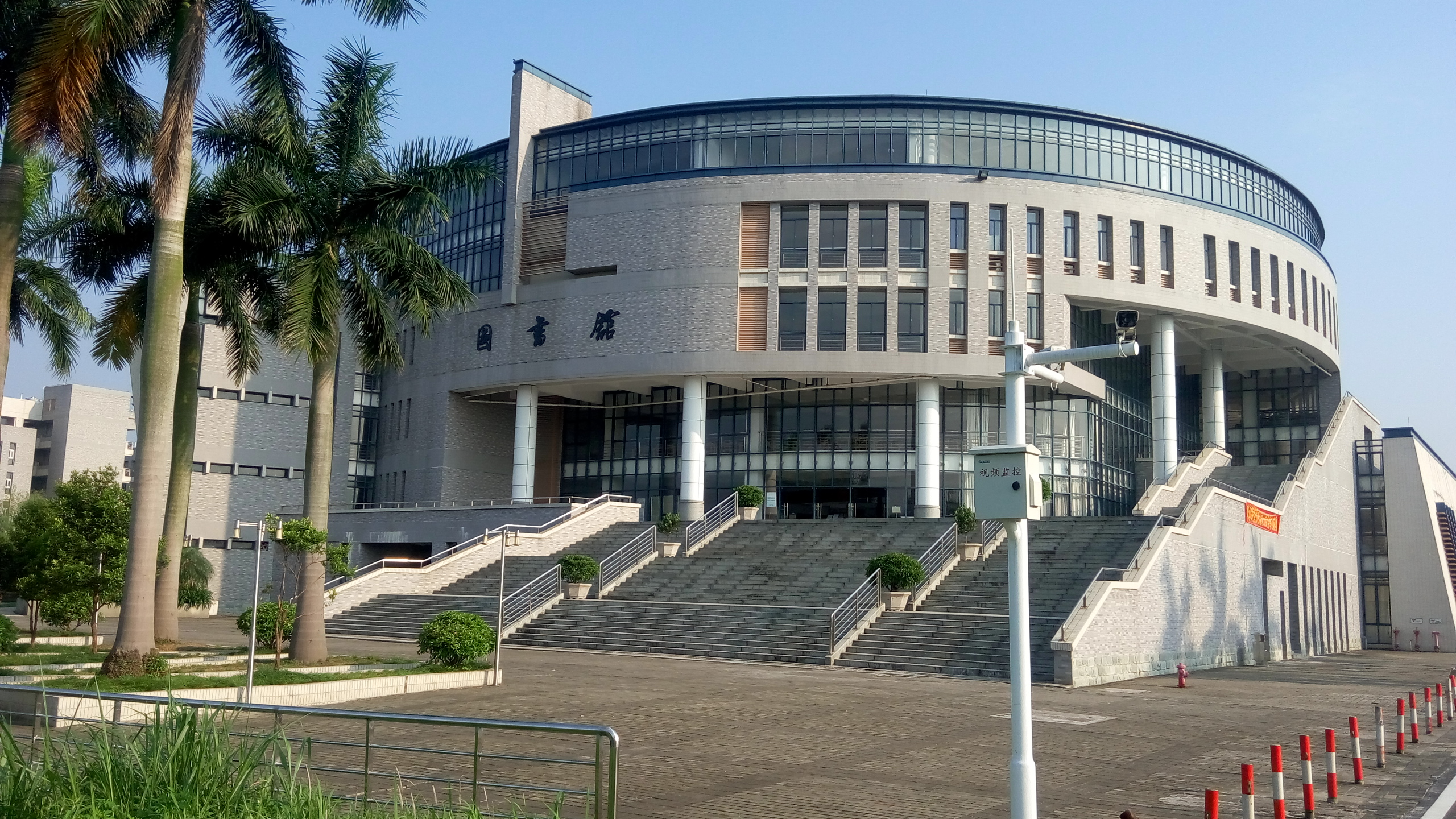
The Library.

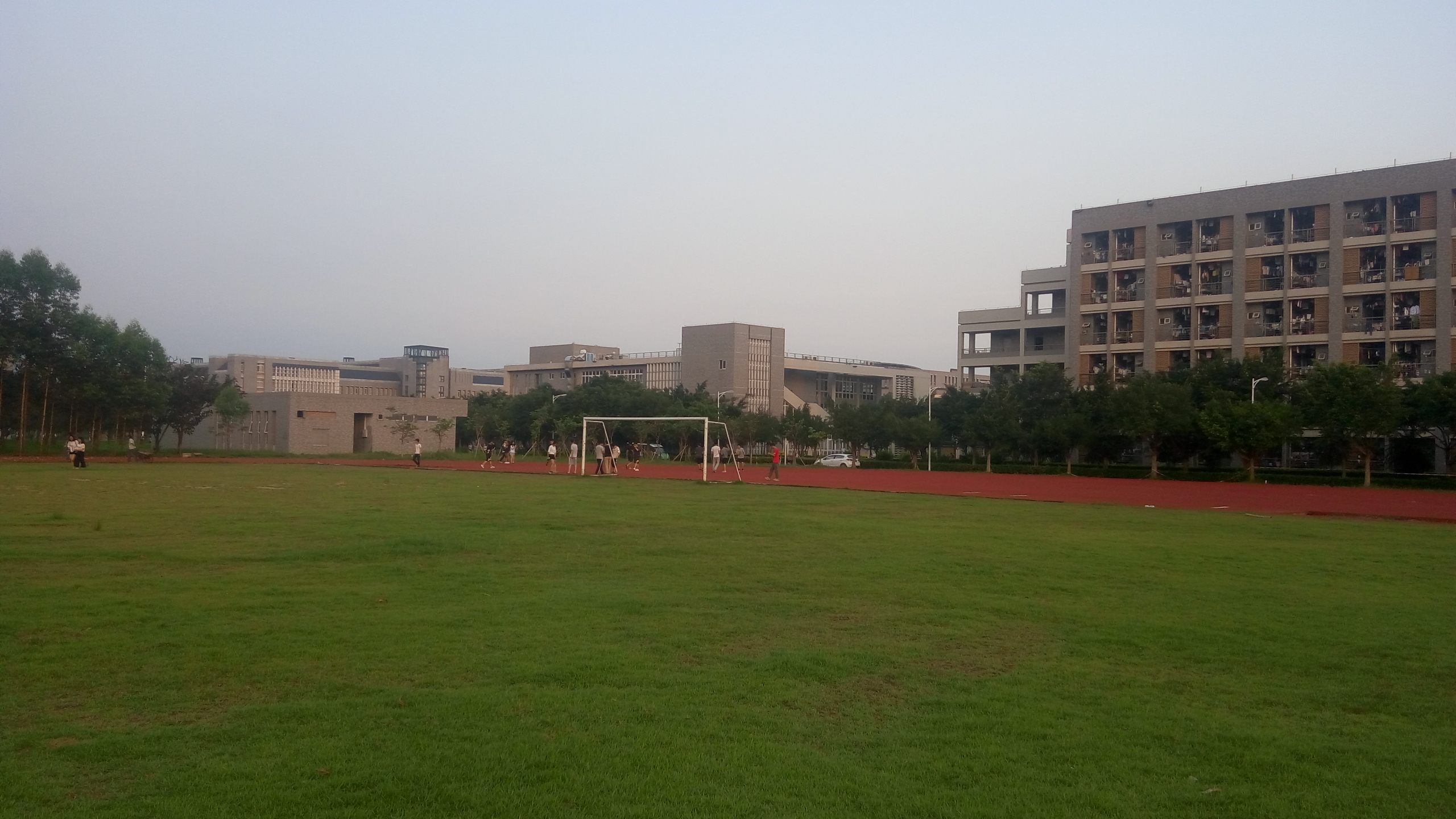
The Football field.

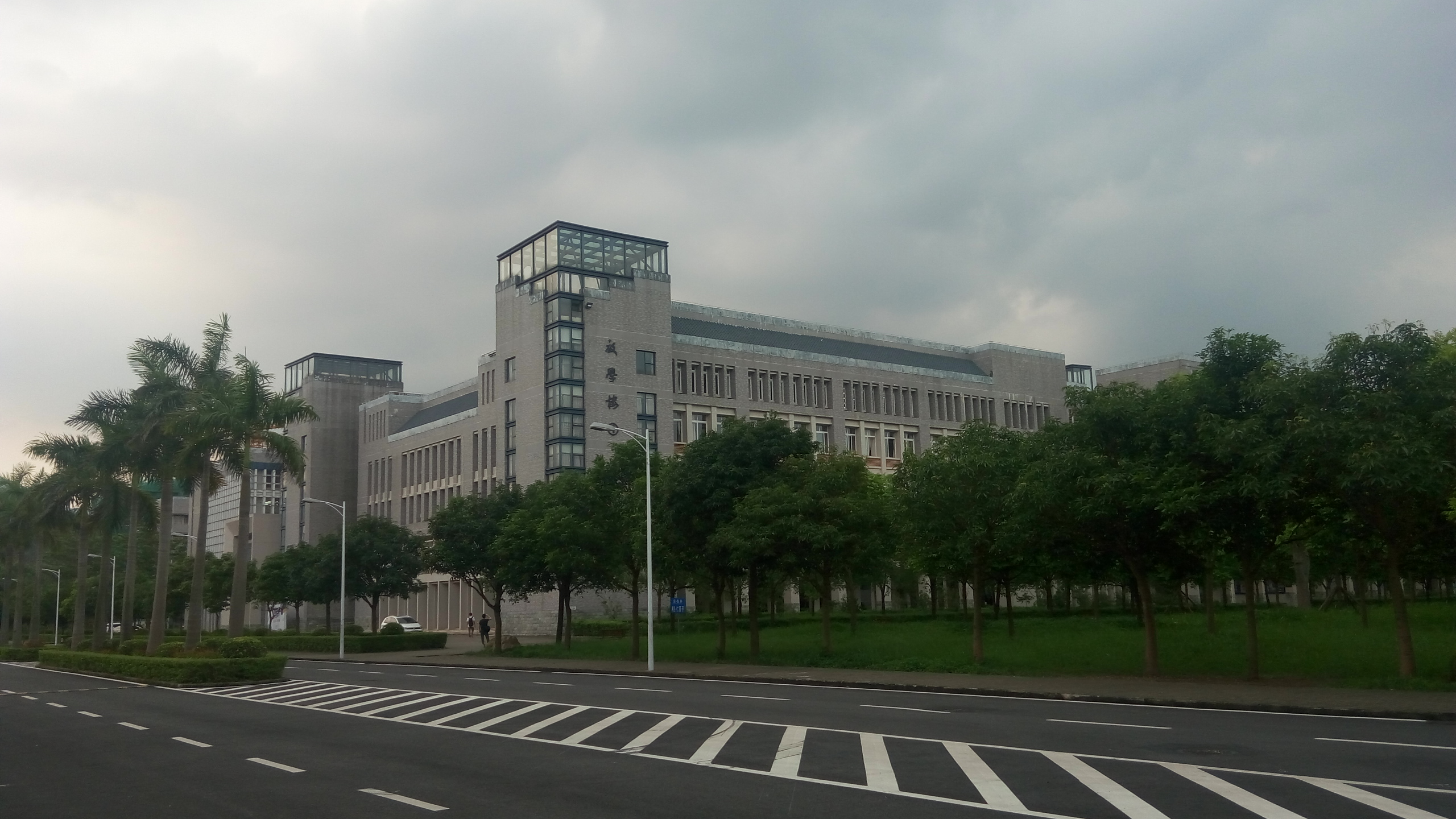
The Teaching Building.

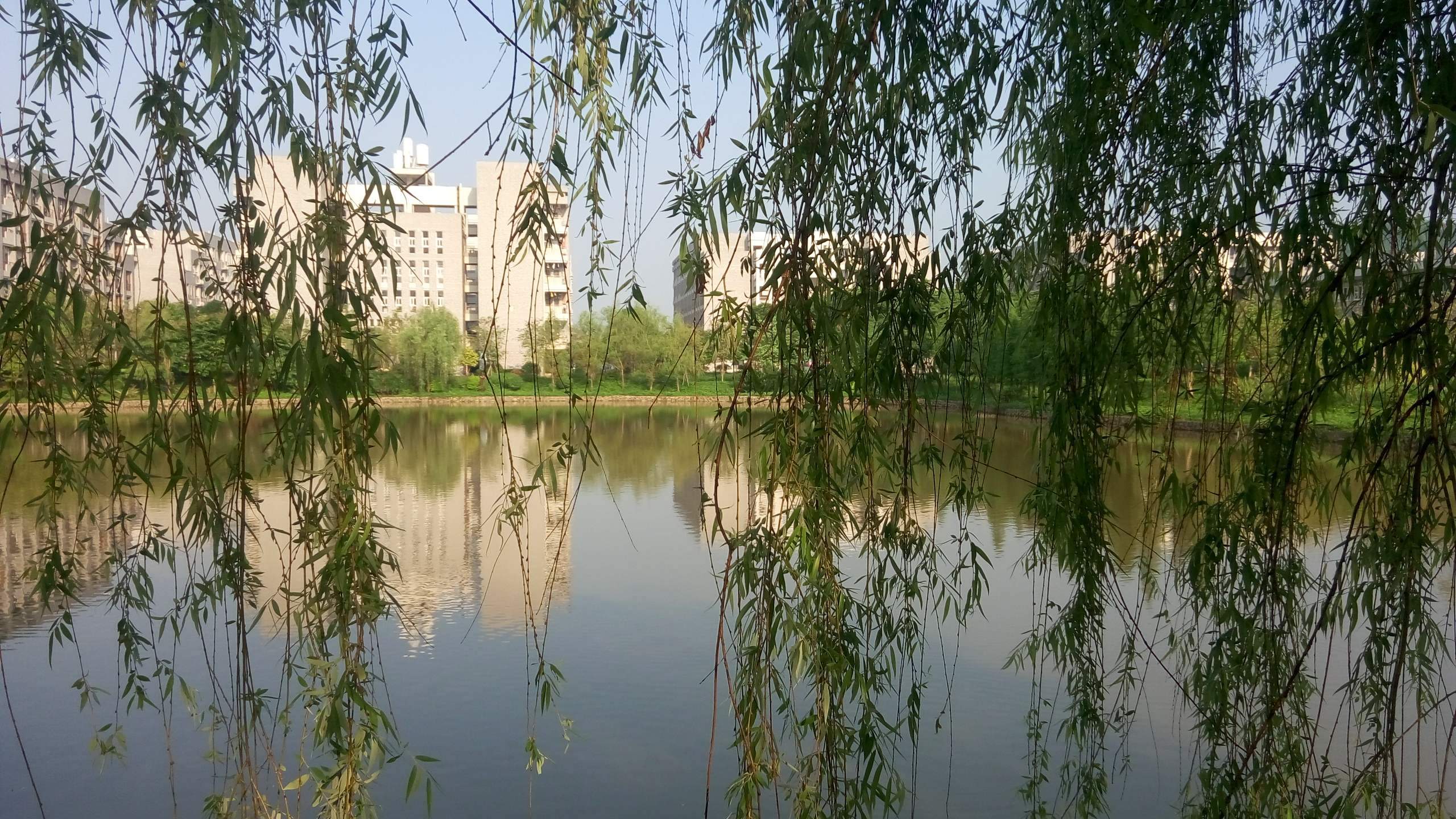
A pond in the college.

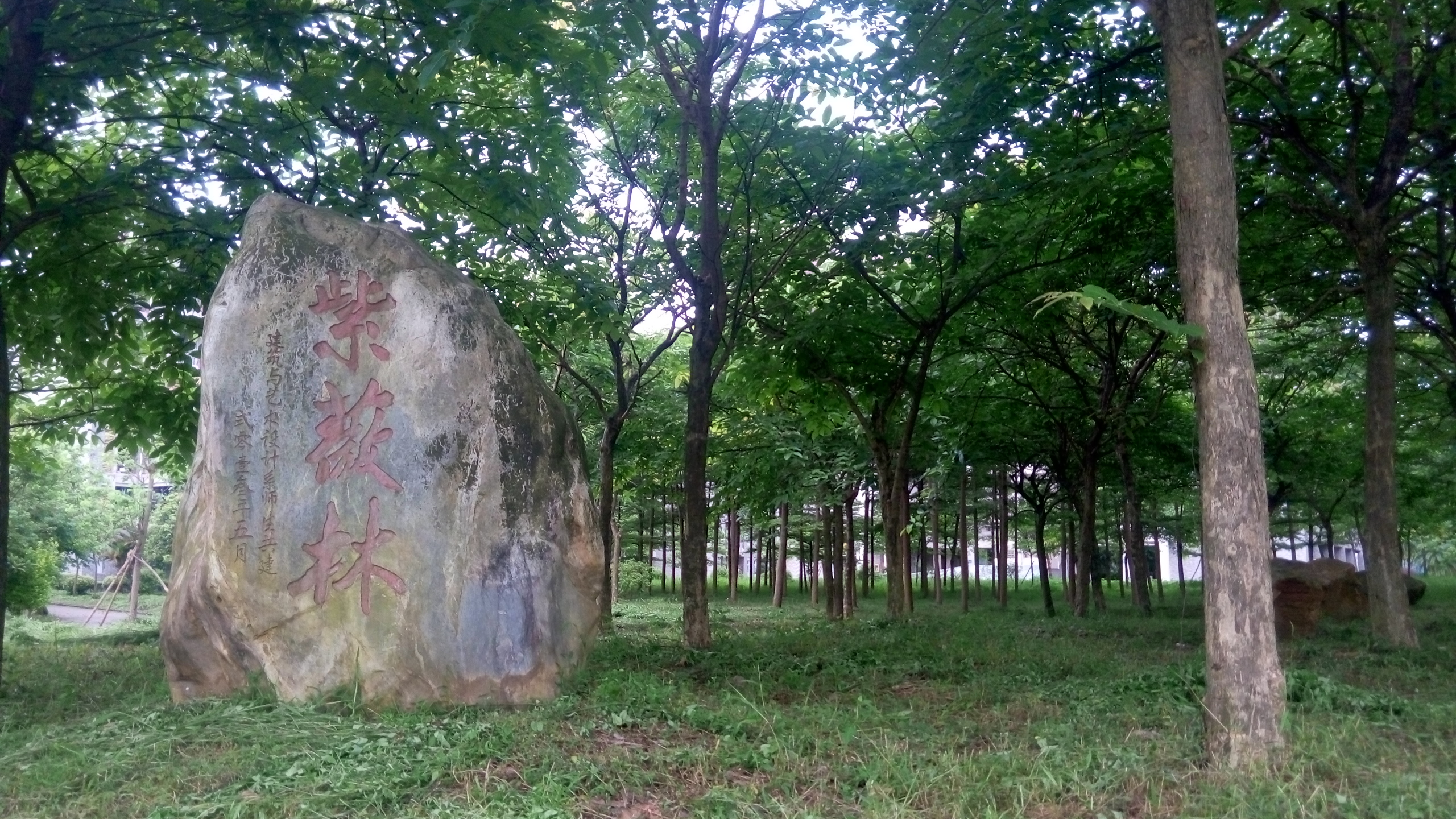
A grove named "Ziwei Grove" (紫薇林).
