= Lingnan Normal University =

University in Zhanjiang, China

Coordinates: 21.2746°N 110.3513°E

Lingnan Normal University (Zhanjiang Normal University)
- 岭南师范学院 (Chinese)
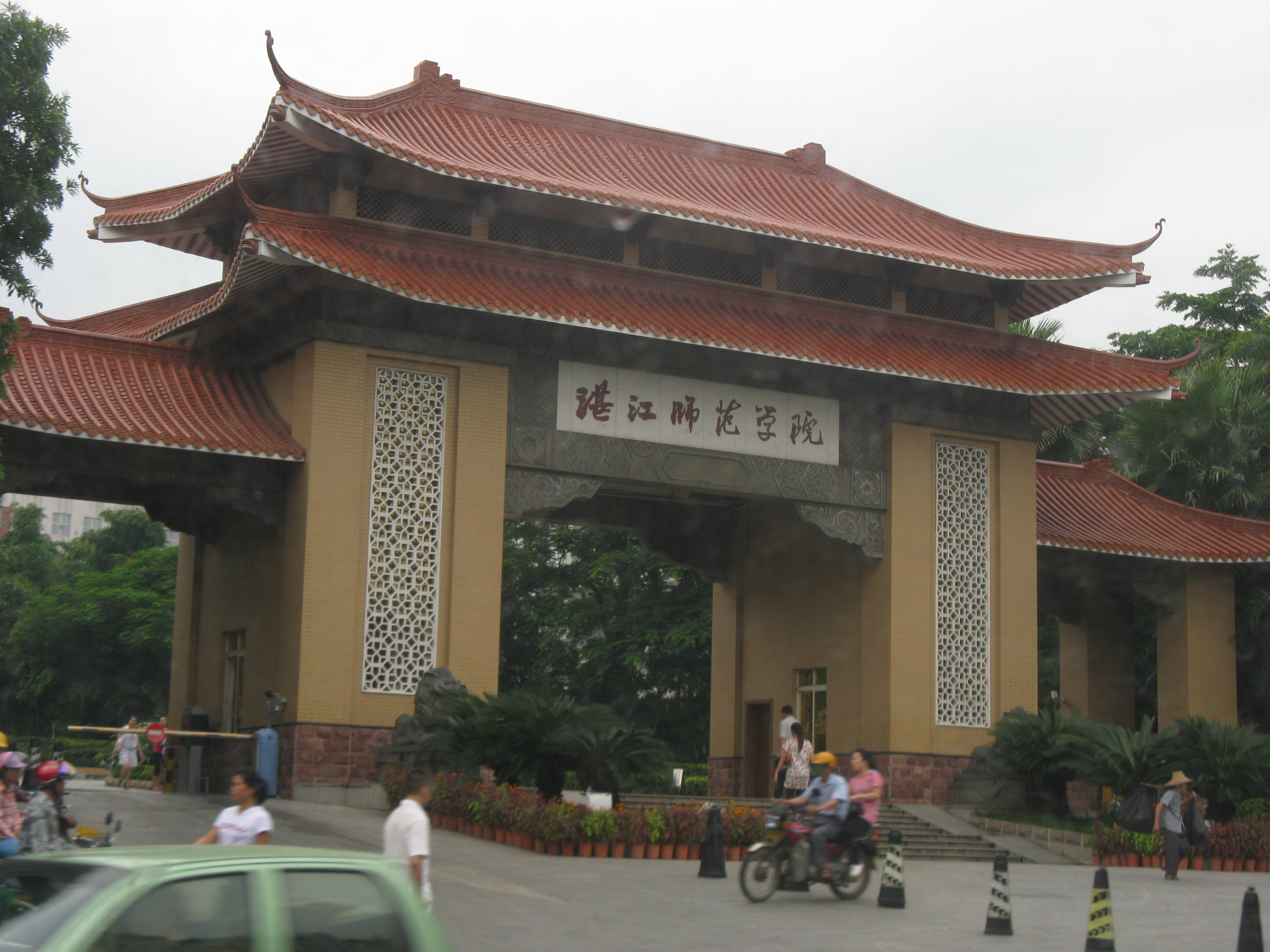
- Type: Public
- Established: 1991; 35 years ago
- Location: Zhanjiang, Guangdong Province, China
- Website: http://www.lingnan.edu.cn/

Chinese name
- Simplified Chinese: 岭南师范学院
- Traditional Chinese: 嶺南師範學院
Transcriptions
Standard Mandarin
- Hanyu Pinyin: Lǐngnán Shīfàn Xuéyuàn

Zhanjiang Normal University
- Simplified Chinese: 湛江师范学院
- Traditional Chinese: 湛江師範學院
Transcriptions
Standard Mandarin
- Hanyu Pinyin: Zhànjiāng Shīfàn Xuéyuàn

Lingnan Normal University (LNU; Chinese: 岭南师范学院, formerly Zhanjiang Normal University (ZNU; 湛江师范学院)) is an institution of higher learning in the Chikan District of Zhanjiang City, Guangdong Province, China.

== History ==
The history of the university dates back to the "Leiyang Academy" (雷阳书院) founded in 1636. In 1904, it started its education training program. In 1978, it became Leizhou Normal College, and was officially named Zhanjiang Normal University in 1991. Zhanjiang Normal University changed its name to Lingnan Normal University in 2014.

== See also ==
- List of universities and colleges in Guangdong
- List of universities in China
