= Liaoning Normal University =

University in Dalian, Liaoning Province, China

Coordinates: 38°54′49″N 121°33′55″E

- Type: Public
- Established: 1951
- Administrative staff: 1,732
- Students: 13,166
- Location: Dalian, Liaoning, China
- Campus: Urban
- Website: www.lnnu.edu.cn

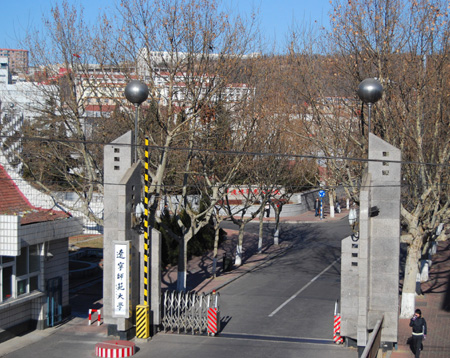
Liaoning Normal University (Entrance to North Campus)

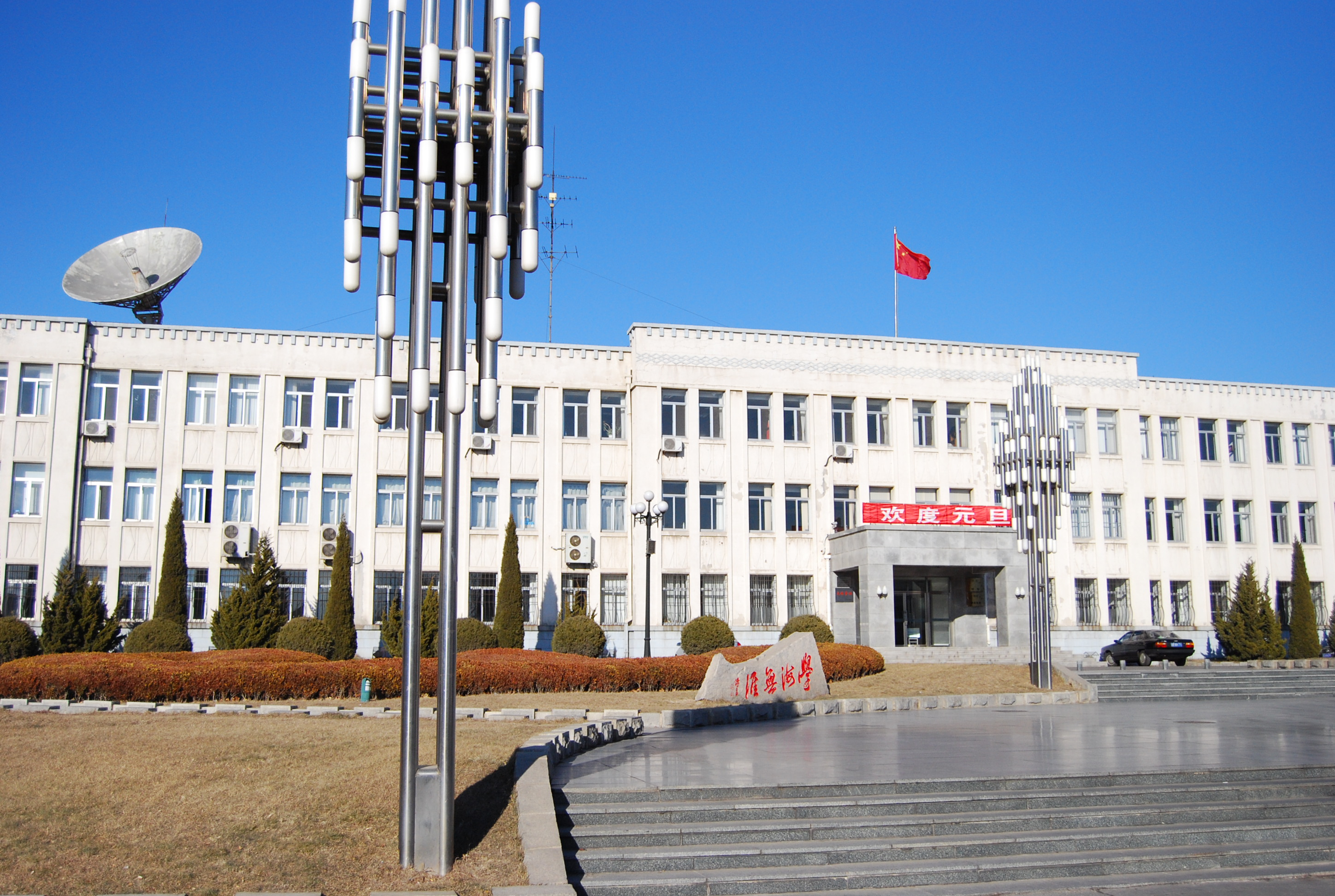
LNU's Main Building

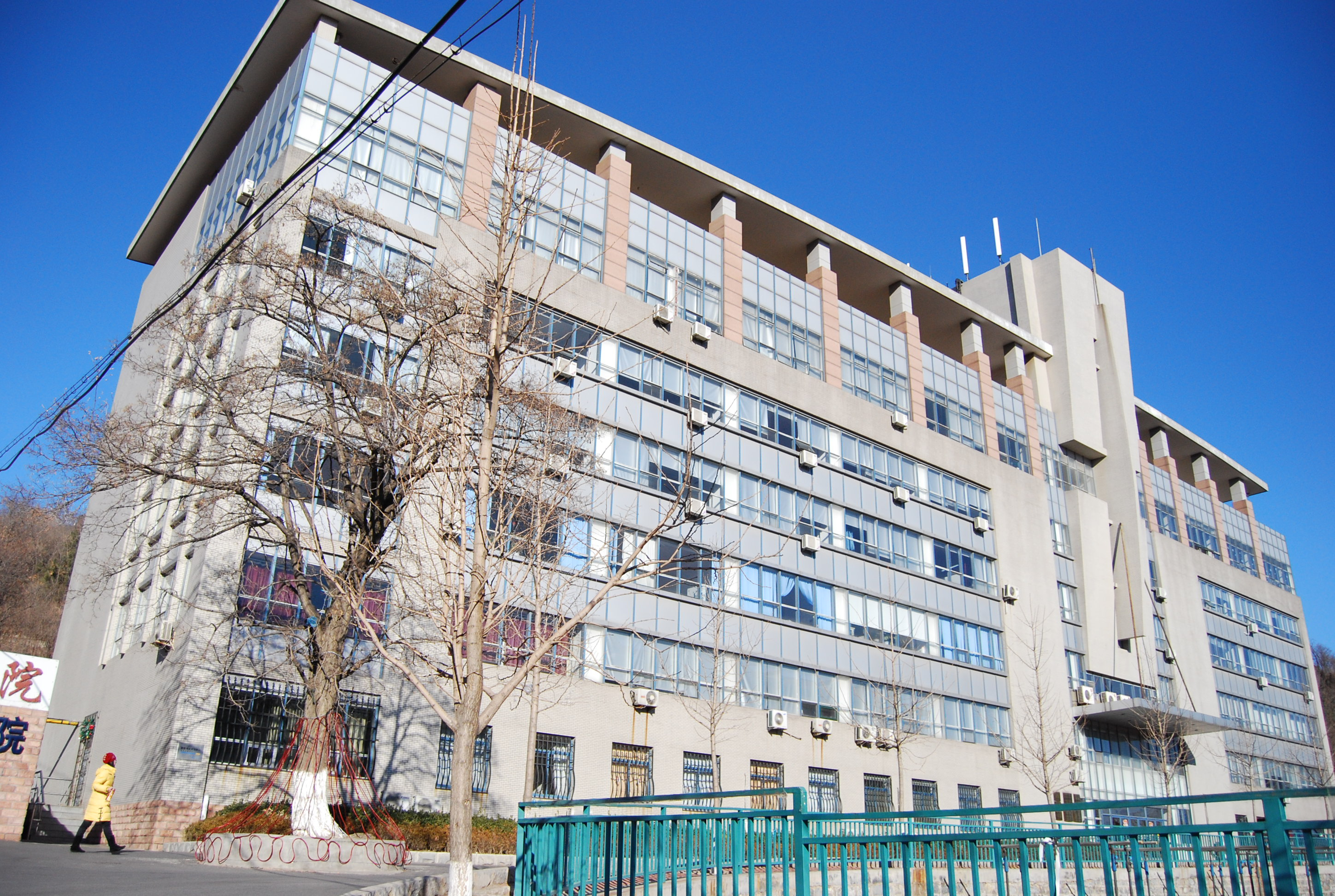
LNU-MSU College of International Business

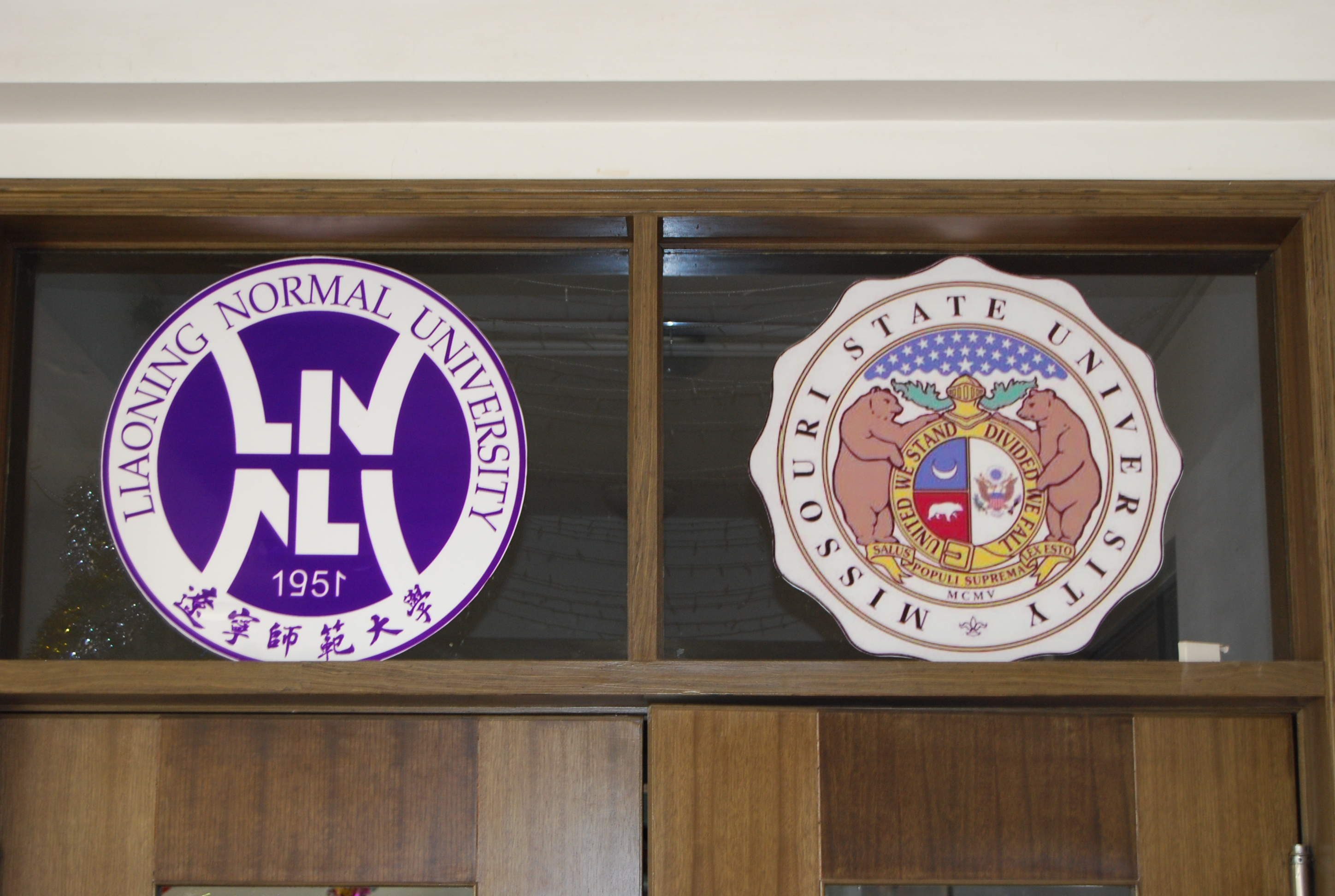
The logos of LNU and MSU

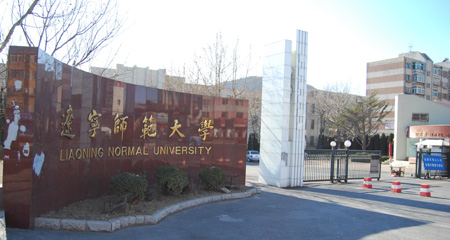
Liaoning Normal University (Entrance to South Campus)

Liaoning Normal University (LNU; simplified Chinese: 辽宁师范大学; traditional Chinese: 遼寧師範大學; pinyin: Liáoníng Shīfàn Dàxué) in Dalian, Liaoning Province, China, is a comprehensive university with an emphasis on teacher training. It has the largest teacher college in Liaoning Province.

== History ==
Liaoning Normal University was established in August 1951 as part of the newly founded People's Republic of China's drive to reform the teacher training system. Under the new shifan (师范) system, certain institutions of further and higher education were established to train future teachers. Financial incentives such as tuition waivers, stipends and fellowships were offered to encourage students to study at these institutions. The normal universities comprised the highest point of this reformed system and were the only institutions from which senior high school teachers could graduate. Liaoning Normal University was one of two normal universities (along with Shenyang Normal University, founded the same year) in Liaoning province.

== Present ==
The university currently has 22 schools and School of Graduate Studies. The university currently has six centers for post-doctoral studies, 32 secondary disciplines entitled for conferring doctorate, 27 primary disciplines entitled for conferring master degree, 118 disciplines for mater degree, 11 specialties for master degree, four first-class characteristic discipline on provincial level (primary discipline), nine key provincial-level (secondary disciplines) disciplines.

The university now offers 72 undergraduate programs (including 5 major orientations), 6 of which are special on the national level, 9 on the provincial level, 4 of which are provincial undergraduate comprehensive reform pilot major, 3 of which are provincial engineering education mode reform pilot major and 1 of which is province key support major. There is one excellent course on the national level, 16 on the provincial level, 4 excellent courses for graduate students and 12 excellent open video courses on the provincial level. There are 9 planned textbooks on the national level, 7 on the provincial level, 2 teaching teams on the national level, 7 on the provincial level, 1 renowned teacher on the national level, 13 on the provincial level, 5 academic leaders on the provincial level, 1 innovation zone of talent training on the provincial level, 7 most needed talent training bases, 2 achievement awards of basic education curriculum reform on the national level, and 5 on the provincial level, 1 education practices construction projects on the national level, and 5 on the provincial level, 17 entrepreneurship and innovation projects on the national level, and 60 on the provincial level, 2 teaching achievement prizes of higher education on the national level, and 51 on the provincial level. 2 teaching achievement prizes of basic education.

The university has NDRC marine biopharmaceutical engineering technology research center. The university houses 7 provincial level key laboratories, 4 provincial level university key laboratories, 1 provincial engineering technology research center, 1 humanity and social science research base in the Ministry of Education, 6 key bases of humanity and social science, 9 research bases of other types, 5 provincial level university innovation teams. There are 3 teachers awarded as New Century Excellent Talents of Ministry of Education of China, 43 University Excellent Talents awarded by the Department of Education in Liaoning Province. During the 11th Five-Year Plan period, the teaching staff have studied and finished 869 scientific research projects, and have published more than 400 books, 6701 academic articles, 579 of which are included in SCI, 100 in EI, ISTP, or SSCI and has got 297 patents approved and received 448 awards for scientific research.

Laying great emphasis on exchange on global level, the university has established ties with 85 universities and research institutions in 16 countries and areas, including Italian Matteo Ricci and Martino Martini Study Center with University of Macerata, Omori Japanese Study and Research Center sponsored by Japanese International Exchange Center, LNU-MSU School of International Business, Film & Television Art College collaborated with Hong Kong and Japanese enterprises, LNNU Research and Development Center for Biopharmaceuticals collaborated with Ulster University of Britain, International professional School with HCC and 2 Confucius Institutes in Miami University and Milan University respectively.

The university has won a series of awards such as Model of Construction and Ideological and Political Work, Juvenile Education, Social Practice, and Juvenile Delinquency Research. It is one of the first modeling universities of national standardization of language and words, group of language and words, and national Putonghua testing center. LNNU has been rated as the best advanced units in ideological and political work, school roll management, university student mental health education and has recived many other awards on provincial and municipal levels.

== Campus ==
Liaoning Normal University is located on Huang He Road (黄河路) on the west side of Dalian. The main campus is divided into southern and northern sections by Huang He Road. It occupies 116 areas, with 350,000 square meters of building space. The university's libraries have 1.33 million books. The university has an additional campus located on Western Hill, close to the main campus.

=== Missouri State University China Campus ===
LNU-MSU College of International Business

The Missouri State University College of International Business China Campus is located inside the Liaoning Normal University's northern campus. The program offers 2-year Associate of Arts degrees in General Studies and 4-year Bachelor of Science degrees in General Business.

== See also ==
- Missouri State University
