= Dongguan University of Technology =

University in Dongguan, China

Coordinates: 23.053196°N 113.770712°E

- Type: Public university
- Established: 1990; 36 years ago
- Affiliations: Guangdong-Hong Kong-Macao University Alliance (GHMUA)
- Location: Dongguan, Guangdong, China
- Website: https://www.dgut.edu.cn

Chinese name
- Simplified Chinese: 东莞理工学院
- Traditional Chinese: 東莞理工學院
Transcriptions
Standard Mandarin
- Hanyu Pinyin: Dōngguǎn Lǐgōng Xuéyuàn
Yue: Cantonese
- Jyutping: dung1 gun2 lei5 gung1 hok6 jyun6*2

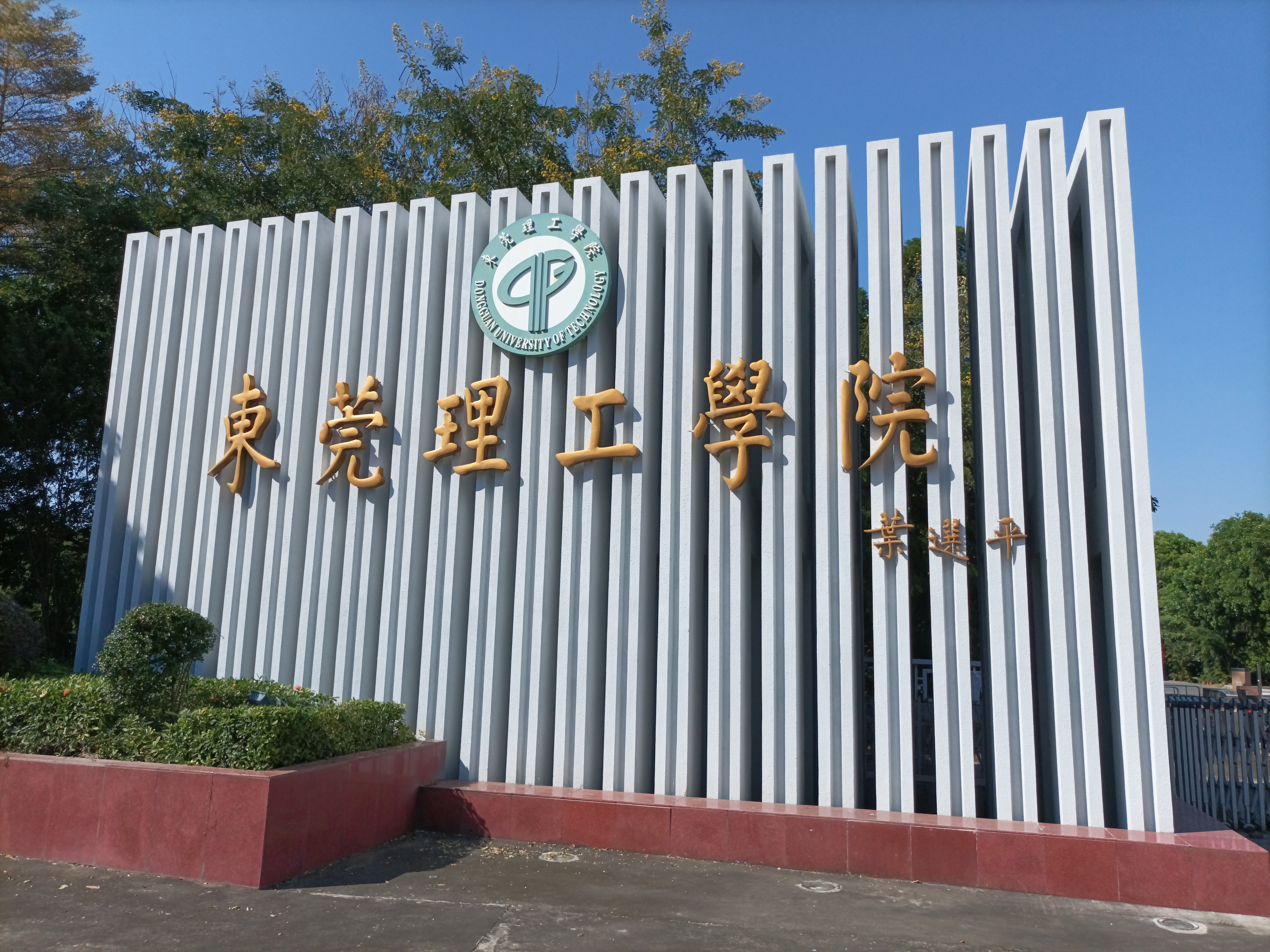
Dongguan University of Technology

Dongguan University of Technology (DGUT; Chinese: 东莞理工学院) is a public college in Dongguan, Guangdong, China.

== History ==
- Planned 1990
- Formed 1992
- First undergraduates 2002
- First graduates 2006

== Academic ==
It has two campuses: Songshan Lake Campus (often considered the Oxford of Guangdong), and the Guancheng Campus in the Guancheng Subdistrict.

DGUT has twenty schools:

- Electrical Engineering and Intelligentization
- Chemical Engineering and Energy Technology
- Computer Science and Technology
- Mechanical Engineering
- Chinese Literature and Media
- Economics and Management
- Marxism
- Graduate
- Elite Engineers (Innovation Entrepreneurship)
- Environment and Civil Engineering
- Materials Science and Engineering
- Microelectronic
- Life and Health Technology
- Law and Social Work (School of Intellectual Property)
- Education (Normal School)
- Industrial Science and Technology (Guangdong-Taiwan)
- DGUT-CNAM Institute (China-France)
- Continuing Education
- Zhixing (School of General Education)
- International School

Electronic Science and Technology, and Chemical Engineering and Technology are authorized as the disciplines of the newly conferred Masters-degree units in DGUT.

Dongguan University of Technology has the physicist Yang Chen-Ning as its Honorary President.
