= Guangdong University of Foreign Studies =

Provincial public university in Guangzhou, Guangdong, China

Coordinates: 23.2003°N 113.2892°E

- 广东外语外贸大学
- Other names: lit. Guangdong Foreign Languages and Foreign Trade University
- Type: Public
- Established: as a university in 1995; 31 years ago
- Affiliations: GHMUA
- President: YAN Xiangbin
- Location: Guangzhou, Guangdong, China
- Website: www.gdufs.edu.cn

Chinese name
- Simplified Chinese: 广东外语外贸大学
- Traditional Chinese: 廣東外語外貿大學
- Literal meaning: Guangdong Foreign Language and Foreign Trade University
Transcriptions
Standard Mandarin
- Hanyu Pinyin: Guǎngdōng Wàiyǔ Wàimào Dàxué
Yue: Cantonese
- Jyutping: gwong2 dung1 ngoi6 jyu5 ngoi6 mau6 daai6 hok6

The Guangdong University of Foreign Studies (GDUFS; 广东外语外贸大学; lit. 'Guangdong Foreign Languages and Foreign Trade University') is a provincial public university in Guangzhou, Guangdong, China.

== History ==
The predecessors of the university were Guangzhou Foreign Languages College founded in 1964 and Guangzhou Foreign Trade College founded in 1980. The two colleges were transferred to the management of Guangdong Province respectively from the Ministry of Foreign Trade and Economic Cooperation and the National Education Committee in September 1994 and January 1995.

In May 1995, the Guangdong Provincial People's Government merged the two institutes, establishing Guangdong University of Foreign Studies.

In October 2008, the Guangdong Provincial People's Government incorporated Guangdong Finance and Economics College, established in April 1996, into the Guangdong University of Foreign Studies.

== Rankings ==
The Guangdong University of Foreign Studies was ranked #901-1000 in 2023 Academic Ranking of World Universities (ARWU), #501-520 in 2025 QS Asian University Rankings, and #996 in 2025 U.S. News & World Report Best Global Universities Ranking.

In the 2024 QS World University Rankings by subject, GDUFS was ranked #201-250 in Linguistics. In the 2024-2025 Best Global Universities Subject Rankings, GDUFS was ranked #215 in Arts and Humanities, #323 in Economics and Business, and #609 in Social Sciences and Public Health. In the 2024 Shanghai Ranking's Global Ranking of Academic Subjects, GDUFS was ranked #301-400 in Education and #401-500 in Economics.
