= Guangdong Pharmaceutical University =

University in Guangzhou, China

Coordinates: 22.4767°N 113.4125°E

- 广东药科大学 (Chinese)
- Type: Public university
- Established: 1958; 68 years ago
- Principal: Zhai Lixiang
- Administrative staff: 2,387
- Students: 18,494
- Undergraduates: 16,469
- Postgraduates: 222
- Location: Guangzhou, Guangdong, China
- Campus: Urban area: 3386 000 square metres/836 acres Guangzhou University City
- Website: www.gdpu.edu.cn

Chinese name
- Simplified Chinese: 广东药科大学
- Traditional Chinese: 廣東藥科大學
Transcriptions
Standard Mandarin
- Hanyu Pinyin: Guǎngdōng Yàokē Dàxué

Guangdong Pharmaceutical University (GDPU; Chinese: 广东药科大学) is a public university based in Guangzhou, Guangdong Province, China, which offers courses in pharmaceutical sciences.

== History ==
The university was established in 1958 as the Guangdong provincial health department's advanced studies college. In 1978, with the approval from the Chinese central government, the college became Guangdong Medical and Pharmaceutical College which offered undergraduate courses. In 1994, the university was restructured as "Guangdong Pharmaceutical College" which offered undergraduate programmes in pharmacy. In March 2016, with the approval of Education Ministry, Guangdong Pharmaceutical College changed into Guangdong Pharmaceutical University. By 2020, the university has five different campuses with three campuses located within Guangzhou metropolitan areas and the main campus is located at Guangzhou Mega Education Center.

== Rankings and reputation ==
=== Nature Index ===
Nature Index tracks the affiliations of high-quality scientific articles and presents research outputs by institution and country on monthly basis.

Year	Rank	Valuer
2023	203	Nature Index - Academic Institutions - China
2024	220	Nature Index - Academic Institutions - China
