= Foshan University =

University in Foshan, China

Coordinates: 23.025889°N 113.09824°E

- 佛山大学
- Motto: 明德博学，自强有为
- Motto in English: Upright, Independent, Accountable, Knowledgeable
- Type: Public
- Established: 1958; 68 years ago
- Affiliations: GHMUA
- President: Zou Cairong
- Faculty: 1490
- Undergraduates: 21,968
- Location: Foshan, Guangdong, China
- Campus: urban
- Website: fosu.edu.cn

Chinese name
- Simplified Chinese: 佛山大学
- Traditional Chinese: 佛山大學
Transcriptions
Standard Mandarin
- Hanyu Pinyin: Fúshān Dàxué

Foshan University (FOSU) is a public college in Foshan, Guangdong, China. It was also named as Foshan Science and Technology College or Foshan Institute of Science and Technology in the translation of English until 2023.

== History ==
The university is a merger between its predecessor and Foshan Agriculture & Animal Husbandry College approved by the Chinese Education Ministry. It came under the administration of the Guangdong provincial government and Foshan local government in 1995.

In 2002, Foshan University was accredited with the national teaching assessment for bachelor's degree program. After merging with Foshan Medical College and Foshan College of Education in 2005, Foshan University has three campuses, all located in Foshan — Xianxi Campus, Jiangwan Campus, Hebin Campus — covering a land area of 2,210.7 acres (8.946 km^{2}), with a total construction area of 345,400 square meters.

== Administration ==
The university comprises the following schools: Literature and Art School, Law and Politics School, Science School, Mechatronics and Information Engineering School, Environment and Civil Engineering School, Life Science School, Business School, Medical School, Education Science School, Faculty of Physical Education.

The university has been developing into a multidisciplinary university with a full set of specialties.

== Faculty and Student ==
Foshan University currently employs 1,625 faculty and staff members, including 1,310 full-time teachers. Among the full-time faculty, 562 hold senior professional titles and 882 possess doctoral degrees. The university has 18 nationally recognized high-level talents and 30 at the provincial or ministerial level serving in full-time positions, while it has also supported the development of 6 national-level and 16 provincial-level high-level talents.

Foshan university has an enrollment of 17,316 full-time undergraduate students, 2,378 master's students, and 58 doctoral students jointly enrolled through collaborative programs.

== International Cooperation ==
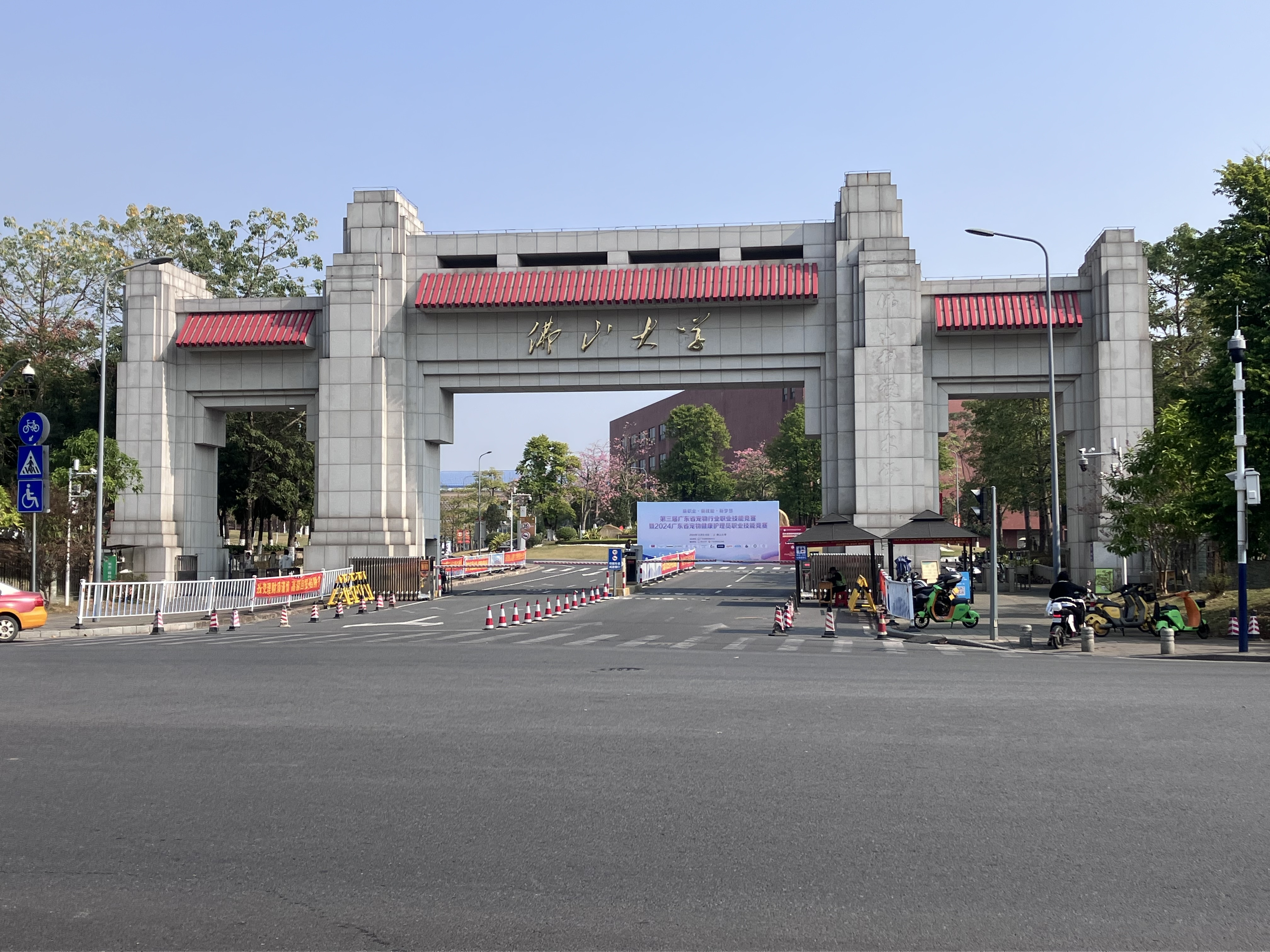
Foshan University

Foshan University has established a joint undergraduate program in Environmental Engineering in cooperation with Trier University of Applied Sciences in Germany. It has also launched joint doctoral training programs with more than ten overseas universities, including Macau University of Science and Technology, Belarusian State University, and the University of Copenhagen in Denmark.
