= Jiaying University =

Public university in Guangdong, China

Coordinates: 24.3254°N 116.1288°E

- 嘉应大学 (Chinese)
- Former names: Jiaying College; Meixian Girls Normal School
- Type: Public university
- Established: 1913; 113 years ago
- President: Cheng Biao
- Academic staff: 923
- Administrative staff: 1,392
- Students: 14,000
- Location: Meixian, Meizhou, Guangdong, China
- Website: http://www.jyu.edu.cn

Chinese name
- Simplified Chinese: 嘉应大学
- Traditional Chinese: 嘉應大學
Transcriptions
Standard Mandarin
- Hanyu Pinyin: Jiāyīng Dàxué
Yue: Cantonese
- Jyutping: gaa1 jing3 daai6 hok6

Jiaying University or historically Kaying University (Chinese: 嘉应大学) is a public provincial undergraduate university based in Meizhou City in Guangdong Province, southern China.

== History ==
The university grew out of the Women's Normal School established in 1913 and received its name because Meizhou was known as Jiaying during the Qing dynasty (1644–1911).

== Physical setting and library ==
The university covers 101 hectares with buildings covering 550,000 square meters. It has 170 million RMB worth of assets such as teaching instruments and equipment, including 31 laboratories with advanced equipment, and houses a collection of 1.82 million books, over 100,000 electronic books and more than 1,500 domestic and foreign periodicals.

== Staff ==
At present, the university has a staff of 1,508, including 1,050 teachers, with 90 full professors and 262 associate professors, and 61 doctoral degree and 475 master's degree holders. Notable experts and scholars from home and abroad have been invited as visiting or honorary professors, such as Qiu Chengtong, Han Suyin, Daisaku Ikeda, Pan Yugang and Wang Fosong.

== Students ==
The university has 19,282 full-time students and 8,499 part-time students from 22 provinces of China. Currently the university offers 45 undergraduate majors in 19 schools and 2 teaching departments, which fall into 10 disciplines, such as the arts, the sciences, engineering, law and medicine.

== Setting and ethnic community ==
The university is rooted in the Hakka homeland, serving mountainous areas and promoting Hakka culture. Since the university was founded, it has received donations totaling 100 million RMB from domestic and overseas outstanding compatriots and alumni, notably Dr. Tsang Hin-chi and Dr. Tin Ka Ping. Its Hakka Research Institute is a key provincial-level research base in humanities and social sciences as well as the research base of Guangdong Hakka studies, and its School of Hakka Studies is the first of its kind in China.

== Degrees offered ==
In 2006, the university successfully passed the undergraduate education evaluation by the Ministry of Education of China. Now it aims to become eligible to award master's degrees around 2013, its 100 anniversary, and to build itself into a local comprehensive university of high quality with distinctive local characteristics renowned in Guangdong Province and throughout China.
