= Guangdong University of Technology =

Public provincial university in Guangzhou, Guangdong, China

- 广东工业大学 (Chinese)
- Motto: 团结 勤奋 求是 创新
- Motto in English: Solidarity, Diligence, Truth-seeking, Innovation
- Type: Public
- Established: 1958; 68 years ago
- Affiliations: Guangdong-Hong Kong-Macao University Alliance (GHMUA)
- President: Qiu Xueqing
- Party Secretary: Hu Qintai
- Academic staff: about 2,300
- Students: 46,022
- Undergraduates: 36,595
- Postgraduates: 8,721
- Doctoral students: 592
- Location: Guangdong, People's Republic of China; 23.0390°N 113.3960°E
- Campus: Urban, 1,241 ha (3,070 acres)
- Colours: Red
- Website: gdut.edu.cn

Chinese name
- Simplified Chinese: 广东工业大学
- Traditional Chinese: 廣東工業大學
Transcriptions
Standard Mandarin
- Hanyu Pinyin: Guǎngdōng Gōngyè Dàxué
- Wade–Giles: Kuang^{3}-tung^{1} Kung^{1}-yeh^{4} Ta^{4}-hsüeh^{2}
Yue: Cantonese
- Yale Romanization: Gwóngdūng Gūngyihp Daaihhohk
- Jyutping: Gwong^{2}-dung^{1} gung^{1}-jip^{6} Daai^{6}-hok^{6}

The Guangdong University of Technology (GDUT; 广东工业大学; 'Guangdong Industrial University') is a provincial public university in Guangzhou, Guangdong, China. The university is affiliated with and sponsored by the Guangdong Provincial People's Government.

The university offers a range of courses in engineering, science, technology, management, liberal arts and law, with major emphasis on the study of engineering. The Guangdong University of Technology ranked 21st in the world for Nature Index 2021 Young Universities (Leading 150 Young Universities) and 76th in China for Nature Index 2022.

== History ==
The Guangdong University of Technology was formerly known as the Guangdong Institute of Technology. Approved by the State Education Commission in June 1995, it merged Guangdong Institute of Mechanical Engineering and the east campus of South China Institute of Architecture.

The Guangdong Institute of Technology was found in 1952 and then merged Central South Institute of Science and Technology in 1961. During the Cultural Revolution, the campus was closed and the school was forced to move to Nanhua Temple in Shaoguan City. The school returned to the Guangzhou campus in 1982, but most of the campus had been destroyed.

The Guangdong Institute of Mechanical Engineering was found in 1956 and also forced to close during the Cultural Revolution.

The East Campus of South China Institute of Architecture was found in 1956.

== Campus ==
=== HEMC Campus ===
100 West Waihuan Road, Guangzhou Higher Education Mega Center. This campus accommodates most of the faculties (70%). Faculty of Foreign Language Studies, used to be located in Longdong Campus before 2011, now is located in Main Campus.

=== Dongfeng Road Campus ===
It was the former campus of Guangdong Institute of Technology and was the main campus until the Guangzhou Higher Education Mega Centre opened in 2005. It is now the campus for the Faculty of Architecture and Urban Planning, Faculty of Art and Design, Faculty of Law and Faculty of Continuing Education.

=== Longdong Campus ===
It was opened in 1999 as a campus for the first and second year undergraduate students. It is now the campus for the Faculty of Management and Faculty of Economics.

=== Panyu Campus ===
Zhongcun Town, Panyu District. It is the campus for the Business School.

=== Shahe Campus ===
It was the former campus of the east campus of the South China Institute of Architecture. It is now the campus for Science and Technology Park.

=== Jieyang Campus ===
The Jieyang Campus is located at Huilai, Jieyang City, and covers an area of 1.32 square kilometers. The first batch of students started school there in September 2021.

=== Wushan Campus ===
It was the former campus of Guangdong Institute of Mechanical Engineering, which was sold to Guangdong Teachers College of Foreign Language and Arts in 2006.

== Library ==
Its well-stocked library has a collection of over 1,600,000 books and 9,000 sets of electronic literature. (more than 2,840,000 books and 10,000 sets now in 2008).

== Faculty ==
It has the privilege to confer Doctor's, Master's, and bachelor's degrees on qualified students. At present the university has 5 doctoral degree programs, 31 master's degree programs (including MBA program), and 52 bachelor's degree programs (10 doctoral degree programs, 51 master's degree programs, including MBA program, and 57 bachelor's degree programs now in 2008).

== Rankings and reputation ==
=== Nature Index ===
Nature Index tracks the affiliations of high-quality scientific articles and presents research outputs by institution and country on monthly basis.

Year	Rank	Valuer
2021	21	Nature Index 2021 Young Universities (Leading 150 Young Universities)
2022	76	Nature Index - Academic Institutions - China
2023	231	Nature Index - Academic Institutions - Global
2023	64	Nature Index - Academic Institutions - China

== International exchanges and cooperation ==
It has played an active role in international scientific research and cultural cooperation and exchanges.

There are more than 50 universities, research institutions and companies abroad that have established academic exchange partnerships with it, including those in the United States, United Kingdom, Germany, France, Russia, Poland, Thailand, Australia and Hong Kong, Macao and Taiwan regions.
