= Shaoguan University =

Public university in Shaoguan, China

- 韶关学院 (Chinese)
- Motto: 立志、崇德、勤学、创新
- Type: Public university
- Established: 1958; 68 years ago
- Chairman: Kong Yunlong
- Principal: Liao Yi
- Academic staff: 1,496 (March 2022)
- Administrative staff: 2,726 (March 2022)
- Students: ~40,000 (March 2022)
- Undergraduates: ~30,000 (March 2022)
- Other students: ~10,000 (March 2022)
- Location: Shaoguan, Guangdong, China
- Campus: Qujiang, 17,573,000 square metres
- Website: http://www.sgu.edu.cn

Chinese name
- Simplified Chinese: 韶关学院
- Traditional Chinese: 韶關學院
Transcriptions
Standard Mandarin
- Hanyu Pinyin: Sháoguān xuéyuàn
Yue: Cantonese
- Jyutping: siu4 gwaan1 hok6 jyun6*2

Shaoguan University (abbreviated as SGU; Chinese: 韶关学院 or 韶大) is a public university based in Shaoguan, Guangdong, China.
