= Zhongkai University of Agriculture and Engineering =

Provincial public college in Guangzhou, Guangdong, China

Coordinates: 23.10787°N 113.28051°E

- 仲恺农业工程学院 (Chinese)
- Type: Public college
- Established: 1927; 99 years ago
- Location: Guangzhou, Guangdong, China
- Website: zhku.edu.cn

Chinese name
- Simplified Chinese: 仲恺农业工程学院
- Traditional Chinese: 仲愷農業工程學院
Transcriptions
Standard Mandarin
- Hanyu Pinyin: Zhòngkǎi Nóngyè Gōngchéng Xuéyuàn

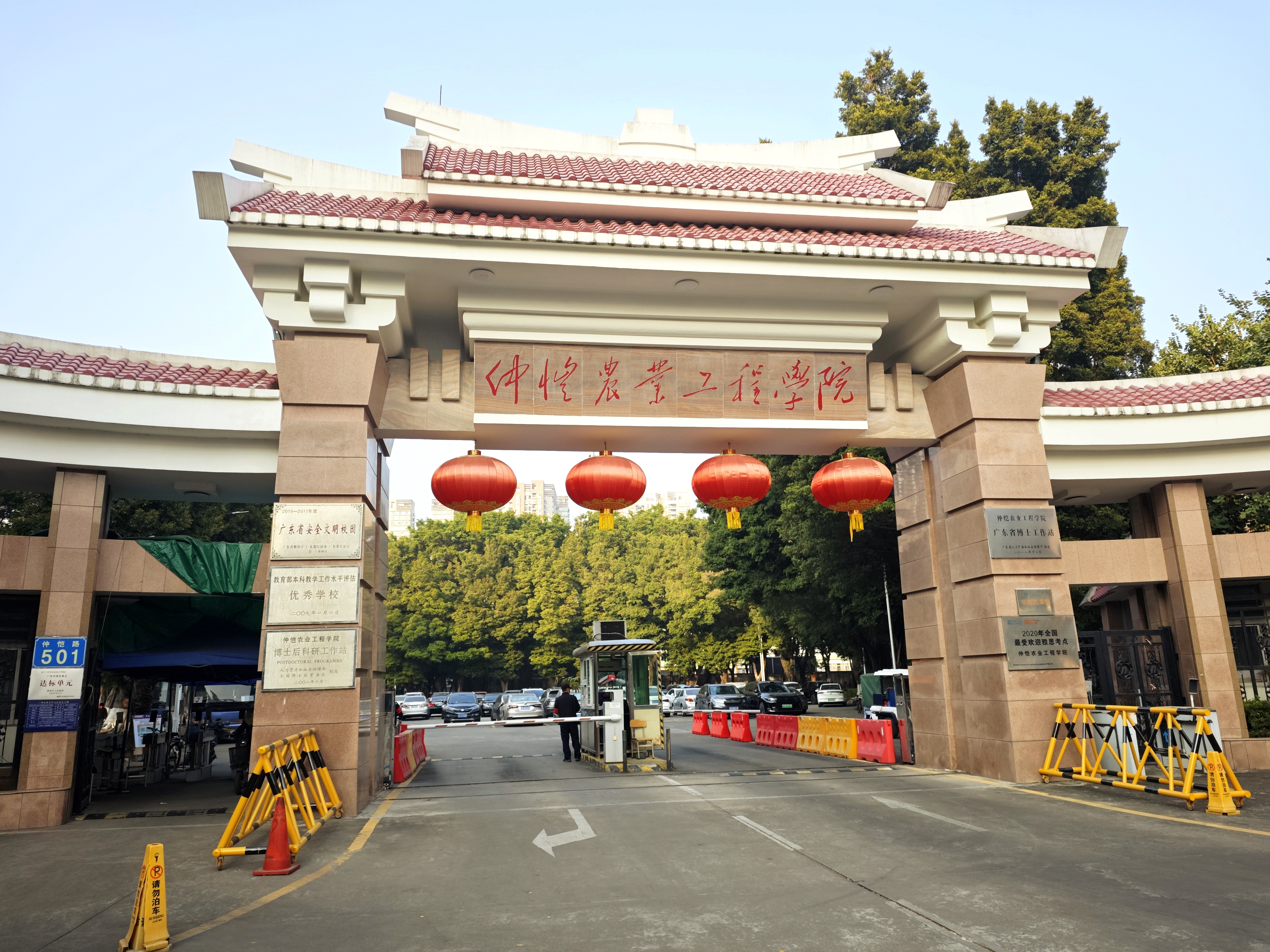
Haizhu Campus, Zhongkai University of Agriculture and Engineering

The Zhongkai University of Agriculture and Engineering (仲恺农业工程学院; lit. 'Zhongkai Agricultural Engineering College') is a provincial public undergraduate college in Guangzhou, Guangdong, China. It specializes in training agricultural technicians. The university is affiliated with the province of Guangdong.

Previously a vocational technical school, the school was granted undergraduate college status in 1984.

Founded in 1927, the school is one of Guangzhou's oldest institutions of higher education. It is named after Liao Zhongkai, a leading figure in the founding of modern China and a close associate of Sun Yat-sen. The school consists of three campuses (Haizhu Campus, Baiyun Campus, and an experimental farm) with a total area of 1,114.7 square kilometres (430.4 sq mi).
