= Guangdong University of Finance and Economics =

Provincial public university in Guangzhou, Guangdong, China

Coordinates: 23.0894°N 113.3546°E

Guangdong University of Finance and Economic
- 广东财经大学
- Type: Public
- Established: 1983
- President: Wang Hua (2009--now)
- Location: Guangzhou, Guangdong, China
- Campus: Urban, 159.06 ha
- Colors: Blue and White
- Website: gdufe.edu.cn

Chinese name
- Simplified Chinese: 广东财经大学
- Traditional Chinese: 廣東財經大學
Transcriptions
Standard Mandarin
- Hanyu Pinyin: Guǎngdōng Cáijīng Dàxué

The Guangdong University of Finances and Economics (Chinese: 广东财经大学) is a provincial public university in Guangzhou, Guangdong, China. The university is affiliated with the Province of Guangdong and sponsored by the provincial government.
