= Zhaoqing University =

University in Zhaoqing, China

Coordinates: 23.0805°N 112.4958°E

- 肇庆学院 (Chinese)
- Type: Public
- Location: Zhaoqing, Guangdong, China

Chinese name
- Simplified Chinese: 肇庆学院
- Traditional Chinese: 肇慶學院
Transcriptions
Standard Mandarin
- Hanyu Pinyin: Zhàoqìng Xuéyuàn

Zhaoqing University (Chinese: 肇庆学院) is a public university based in the Duanzhou District of the prefecture-level city of Zhaoqing, Guangdong Province, China. It is a provincial comprehensive university that enrolls students in four-year degree programmes.

== History ==
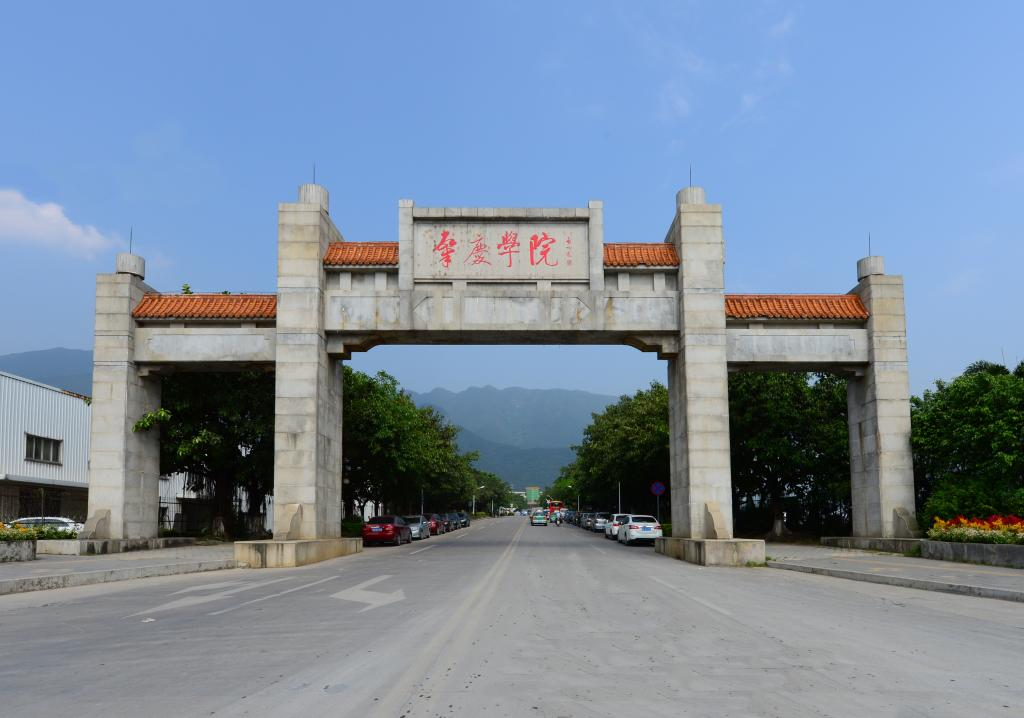
Zhaoqing University's main entrance

Zhaoqing University was established in 1970. It assists in the social and economic development in Zhaoqing and the adjacent Yunfu district, both of which have a population of over seven million.

== Campuses ==
The university's two campuses occupy an area of 67.73 hectares and have 349,215 square meters of floor space.

=== Main Campus ===
The Main Campus is in Donggang. It is the older of the two campuses and consists of the major teaching departments, laboratories and research facilities and includes the teacher training, career education and international programmes.

=== Star Lake Campus ===
The Star Lake Campus is adjacent to Star Lake. The campus buildings surround a small artificial lake that is visible when entering through the front gate. In 2000 the only thing that could be seen from the campus were rice paddies and fish farming ponds. In the past years the surrounding area has seen much development and large multistory apartment buildings can now be seen from the complex. The campus is the centre for the adult education programme and other studies.

The Star Lake Campus was formerly an independent university named Zhaoqing Institute of Education (simplified Chinese: 肇庆教育学院; traditional Chinese: 肇慶教育學院; pinyin: Zhàoqìng jiàoyù xuéyuàn). It was a teaching college whose students were primarily from Guangdong Province and included a small minority from neighboring provinces. In March 2000 it merged with Xijiang University (simplified Chinese: 西江大学; traditional Chinese: 西江大學; pinyin: Xijiāng dàxué) to form the current Zhaoqing University.

The Star Lake Campus has had a sister college relationship with Anoka-Ramsey Community College in the U.S. state of Minnesota since 1994. Upon the merger of the two Chinese universities, this sister relationship has continued on with Zhaoqing University. Every year a Chinese language and culture teacher spends a full academic year at Anoka-Ramsey Community College and several American students study at Zhaoqing University.

== Administration ==
The university has 1,049 members of staff, with 675 of them being faculty members. There are 10,947 full-time and 5,347 part-time students.

=== Faculties and departments ===
The university is organized in the following faculties.

- Faulty of Teacher Education
- Faculty of Foreign Languages
- Faculty of Politics and Law
- Faculty of Economics and Management
- Faculty of Pedagogy
- Faculty of Mathematics and Information Sciences
- Faculty of Computer Science and Software
- Faculty of Chemistry and Chemical Engineering
- Faculty of Life Sciences
- Faculty of Electronic Information Mechanical and Electrical Engineering
- Faculty of Physical Education and Health
- Faculty of Fine Arts
- Faculty of Music
- Faculty of Tourism
- Faculty of Chinese Language and Literature
- Faculty of Continuing Education
