= Guangdong =

Province in South China

Guangdong 广东 Kwangtung, Canton
- Province

Chinese transcription(s)
  - Simplified Chinese: 广东省
  - Hanyu Pinyin: Guǎngdōng shěng
  - Jyutping: gwong^{2} dung^{1} saang^{2}
  - Abbreviation: GD / 粤 (Yuè / jyut^{6})
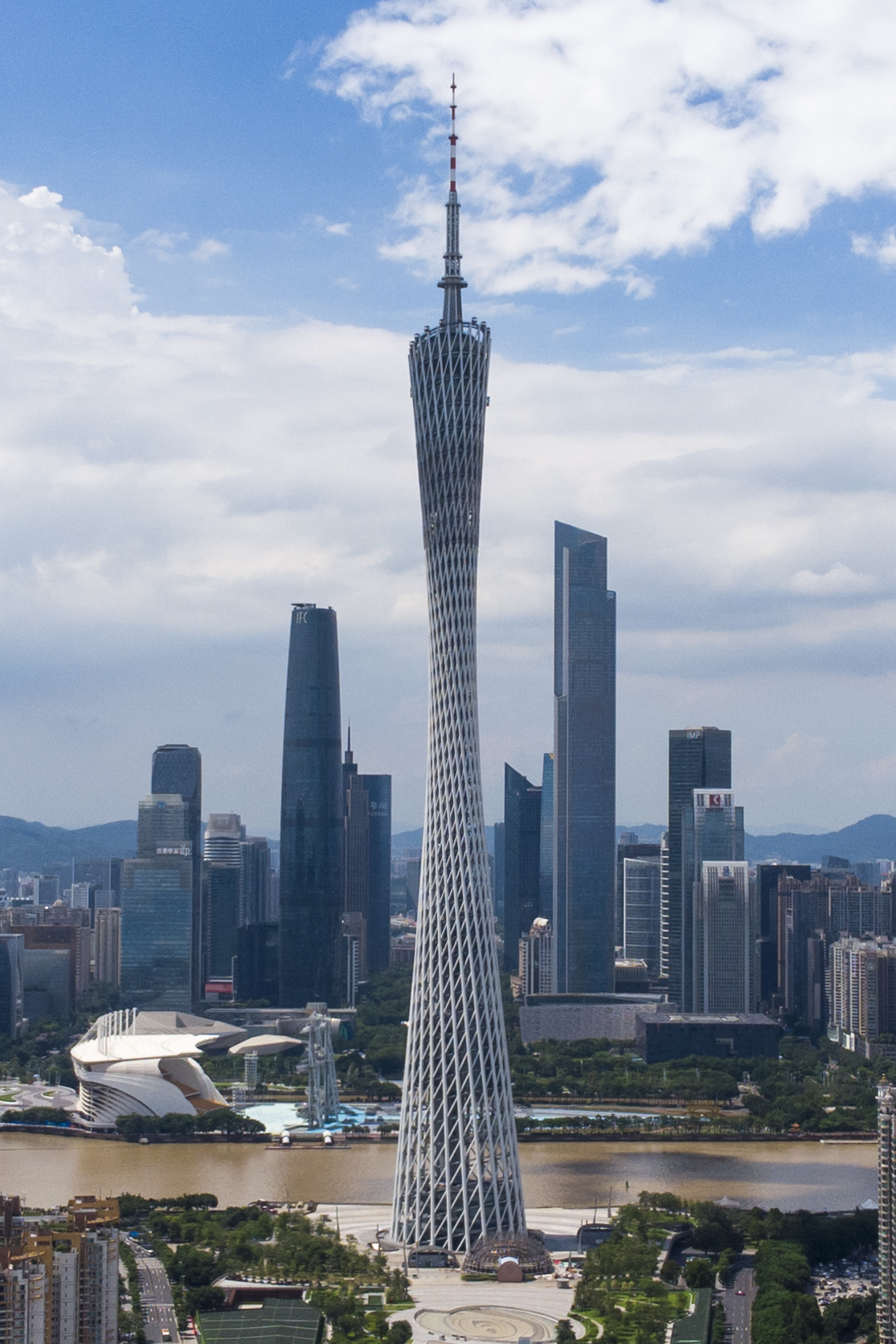
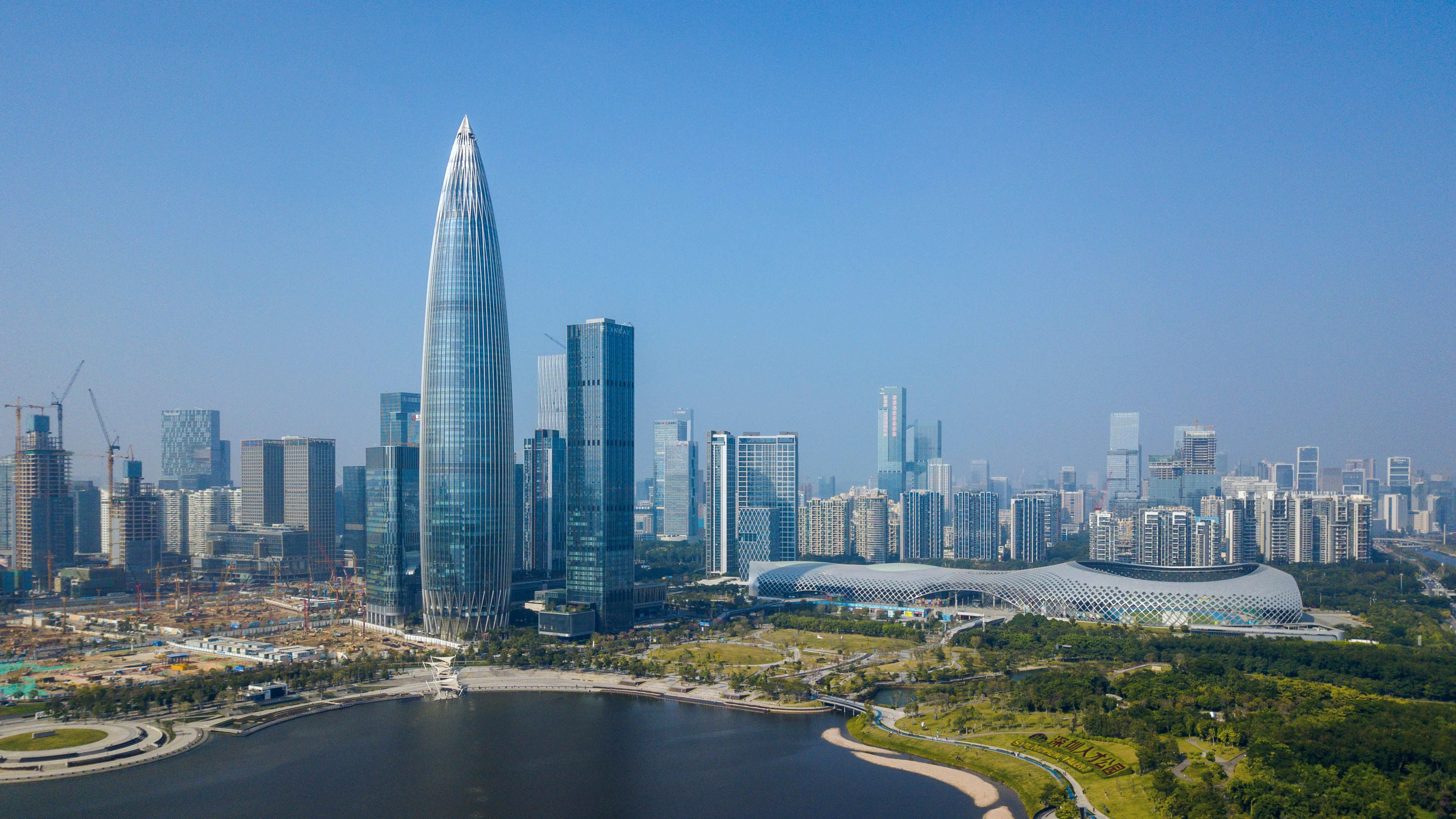
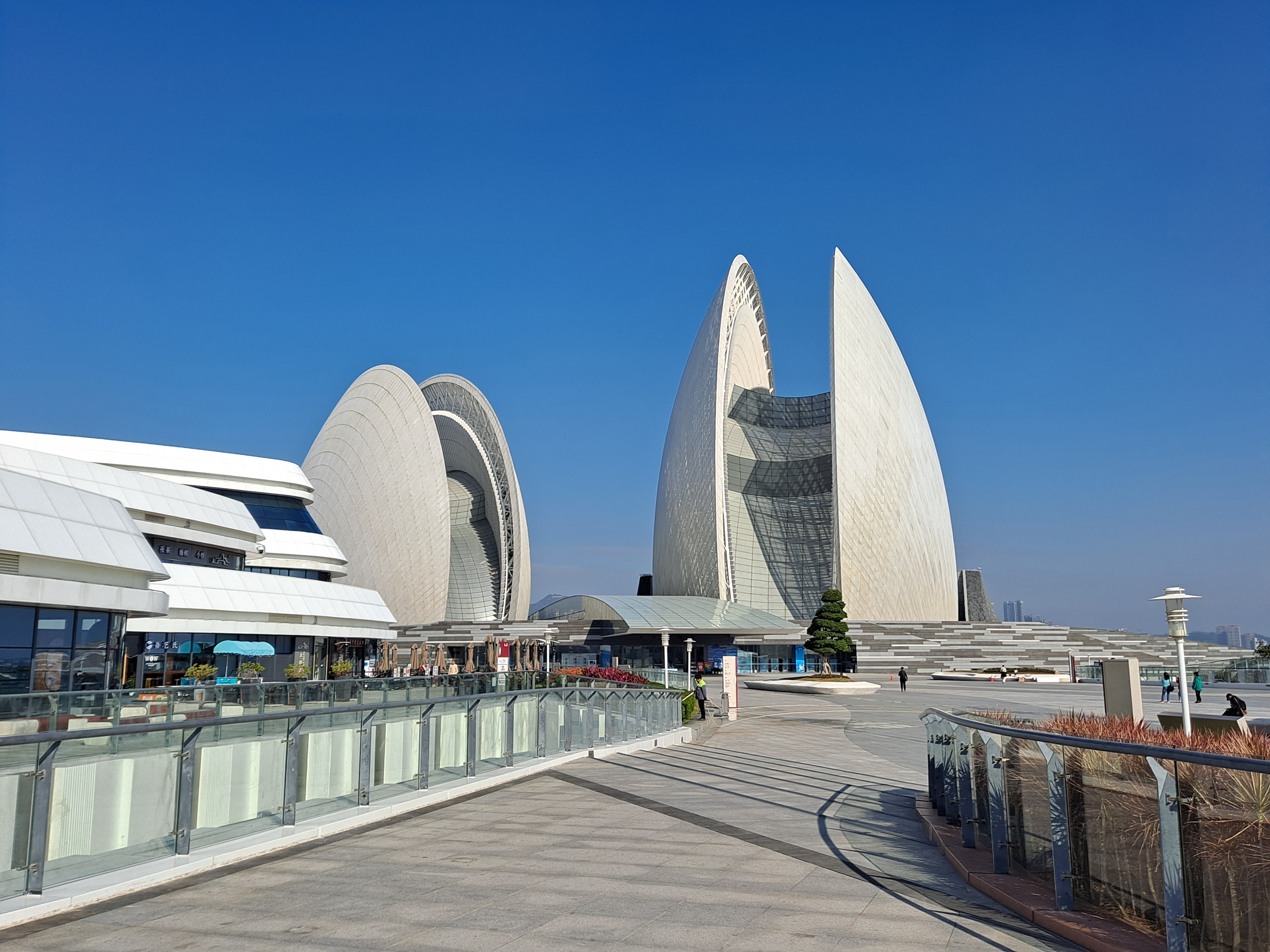
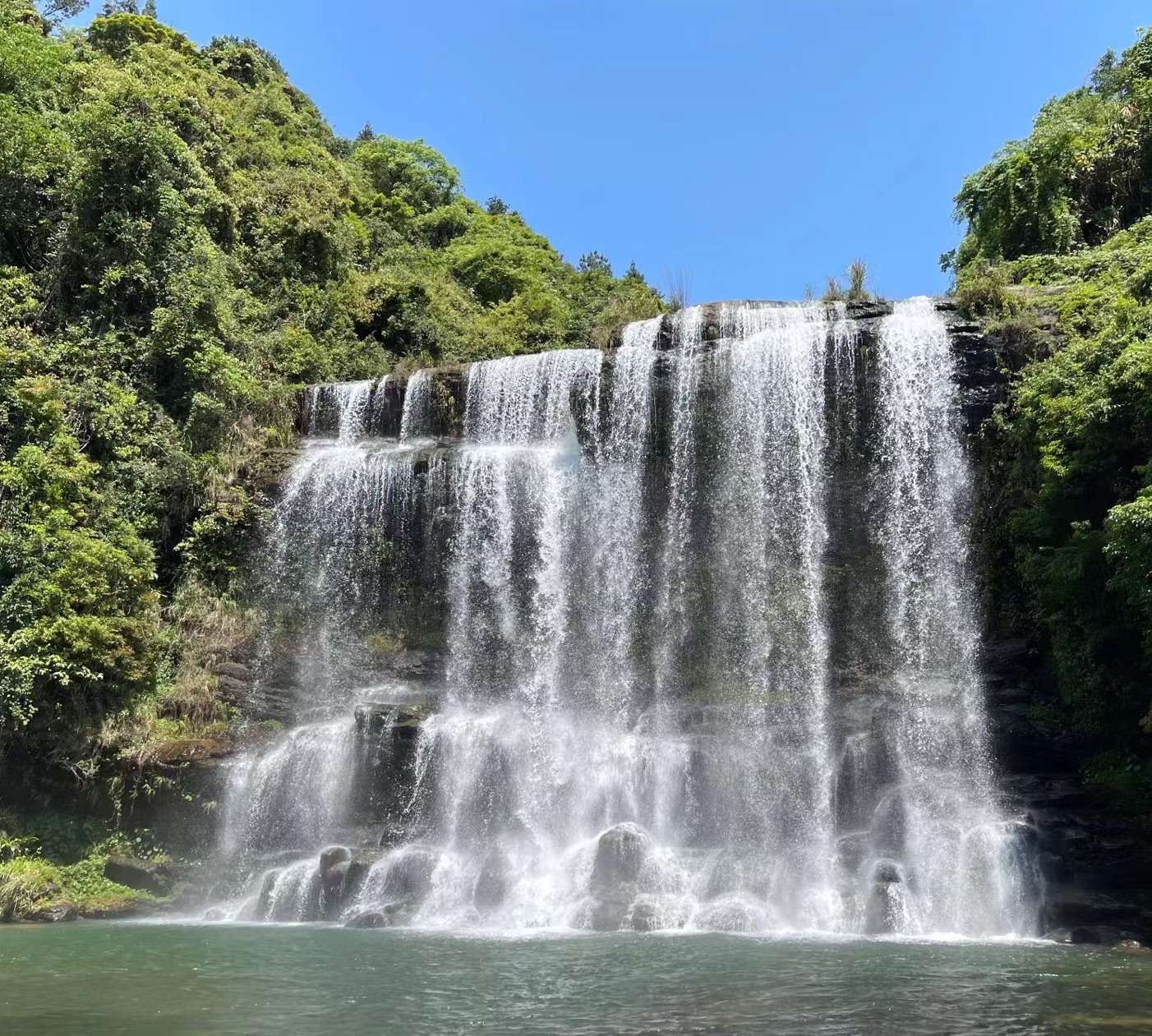
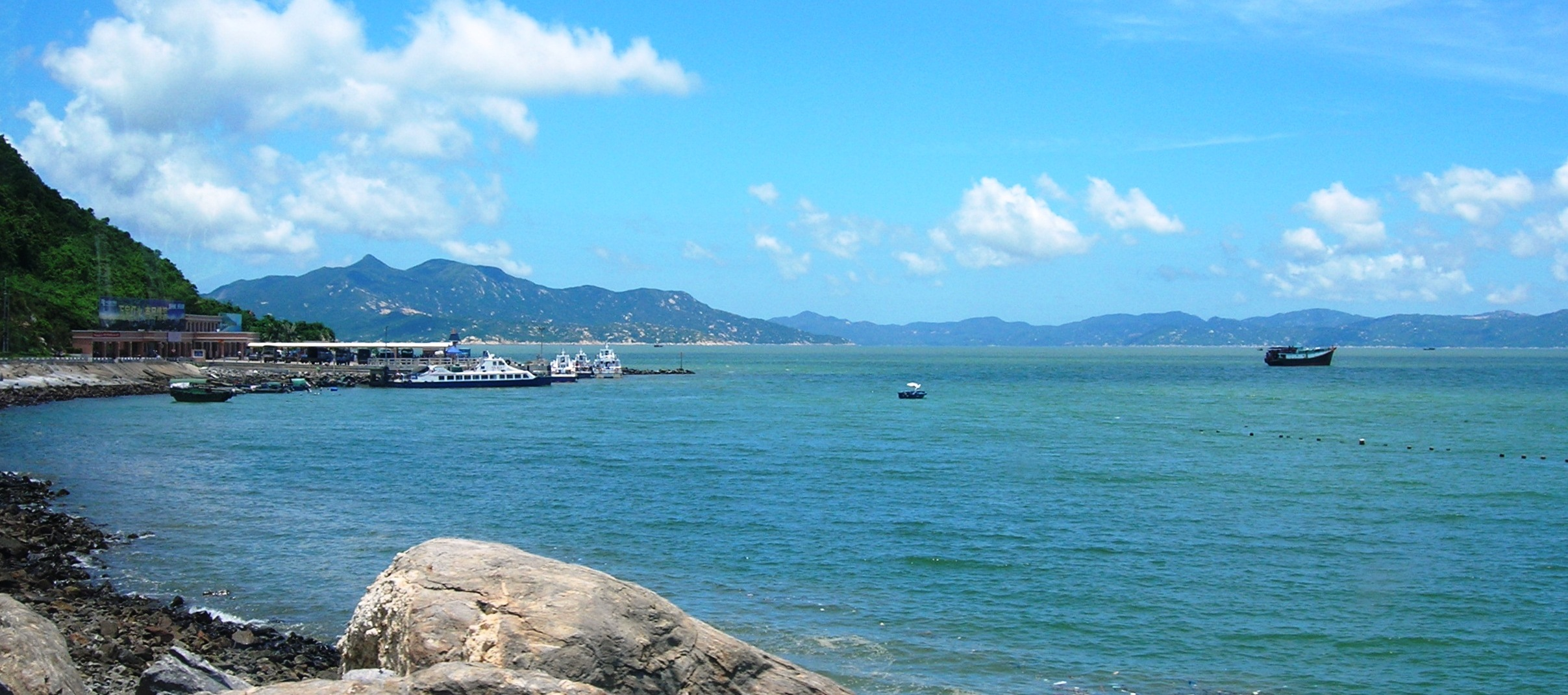
- Canton Tower Nanshan, Shenzhen Zhuhai Opera House Huangmanzhai Waterfall Xiachuan Island in Taishan

- Location of Guangdong in China
- Coordinates: 23°24′N 113°30′E
- Country: China
- Named for: 广 – 'vast', 'expanse'; 东 – 'east'; Literally, 'east of the expanse'
- Capital; (and largest city): Guangzhou
- Divisions: 21 prefectures; 122 counties; 1609 towns and subdistricts

Government
  - Type: Province
  - Body: Guangdong Provincial People's Congress
  - Party Secretary: Huang Kunming
  - Congress Chairman: Huang Chuping
  - Governor: Meng Fanli
  - Provincial CPPCC Chairman: Lin Keqing
  - National People's Congress Representation: 169 deputies

Area
  - Total: 179,800 km^{2} (69,400 sq mi)
  - Rank: 15th
- Highest elevation (Shikengkong): 1,902 m (6,240 ft)

Population (2026)
  - Total: 128,590,000
  - Rank: 1st
  - Density: 715.2/km^{2} (1,852/sq mi)
  - Rank: 7th
- Demonym(s): Cantonese, Guangdongese

GDP (2025)
  - Total: CN¥14.58 trillion (1st; US$2.04 trillion)
  - Per capita: CN¥113,769 (7th; US$15,928)
- ISO 3166 code: CN-GD
- HDI (2023): 0.823 (6th) – very high
- Website: www.gd.gov.cn (in Chinese)

Guangdong
- Simplified Chinese: 广东
- Traditional Chinese: 廣東
- Postal: Kwangtung
- Literal meaning: "Eastern expanse"
Transcriptions
Standard Mandarin
- Hanyu Pinyin: Guǎngdōng
- Bopomofo: ㄍㄨㄤˇ ㄉㄨㄥ
- Wade–Giles: Kuang^{3}-tung^{1}
- Tongyong Pinyin: Guǎngdong
- Yale Romanization: Gwǎngdūng
- MPS2: Guǎngdūng
- IPA: [kwàŋ.tʊ́ŋ]
Wu
- Wugniu: kuaon^{3} ton^{1}
- IPA: Shanghainese: [kuɑ̃˧ toŋ˦]
Hakka
- Romanization: Gong^{3}dung^{1}; or; Kóng-tûng
Yue: Cantonese
- Yale Romanization: Gwóngdùng; or; Gwóngdūng
- Jyutping: gwong^{2} dung^{1}
- Canton Romanization: Guong^{2}-dung^{1}
- IPA: [kʷɔŋ˧˥.tʊŋ˥˧]; or; [kʷɔŋ˧˥.tʊŋ˥]
other Yue
- Taishanese: Kwong˧˥ tung˥
Southern Min
- Hokkien POJ: Kńg-tang
- Tâi-lô: Kńg-tang
- Hainanese Romanization: Kèng-dang
- Leizhou Romanization: Gèng-tang
Eastern Min
- Fuzhou BUC: Guōng-dĕ̤ng
Middle Chinese
- Middle Chinese: kwang^{X} tung

Abbreviation
- Simplified Chinese: 粤
- Traditional Chinese: 粵
Transcriptions
Standard Mandarin
- Hanyu Pinyin: Yuè
- Bopomofo: ㄩㄝˋ
- Wade–Giles: Yüeh^{4}
- Tongyong Pinyin: Yuè
- Yale Romanization: Ywè
- MPS2: Yuè
- IPA: [ɥê]
Wu
- Wugniu: yuq^{8}, yoq^{8}
- IPA: Shanghainese: [ɦyɪʔ˩˨]; [ɦioʔ˩˨]; Suzhounese: [ɦyəʔ˨]; Changzhounese: [ɦyəʔ˨˧]; Hangzhounese: [ɦyəʔ˨]; Ningbonese: [ɦyəʔ˩˨]
Hakka
- Romanization: Yet^{6} or Ye̍t
Yue: Cantonese
- Yale Romanization: Yuht
- Jyutping: jyut^{6}
- Canton Romanization: Yüd^{6}
- IPA: [jyt̚˨]
other Yue
- Taishanese: Yut˨
Southern Min
- Hokkien POJ: Oa̍t
- Tâi-lô: Ua̍t
- Leizhou Romanization: O̍et

Guangdong (Note: UK: /ɡwæŋˈdʊŋ/, US: /ɡwɑːŋ-/; previously romanized as Kwangtung or Canton) is a coastal province in South China, on the north shore of the South China Sea with Guangzhou as the capital. With a population of 128.590 million (as of 2026) across a total area of about 179,800 km^{2} (69,400 sq mi), Guangdong is the Chinese province with the largest GDP, the largest population and the 15th-largest by area, as well as the fifth-most populous country subdivision and the 5th largest country subdivision by GDP in the world.

Guangdong's economy is the largest of any provincial-level division in China, with a GDP of CN¥14.16 trillion (US$2.0 trillion in GDP nominal) in 2024, contributing approximately 10.5 percent of mainland China's economic output. It has a diversified economy, and was known as the starting point of ancient China's Maritime Silk Road. It is home to the production facilities and offices of a wide-ranging set of Chinese and foreign corporations. Guangdong has benefited from its proximity to the financial hub of Hong Kong, which it borders to the south. Guangdong also hosts the largest import and export fair in China, the Canton Fair, in Guangzhou. The Pearl River Delta Economic Zone, a Chinese megalopolis, is a core for high tech, manufacturing and international trade. In this zone are two of the four top Chinese cities and the top two Chinese prefecture-level cities by GDP: Guangzhou and Shenzhen, the first special economic zone in the country. These two are among China's most populous and important cities, and have become two of the world's most populous megacities and leading financial centres in the Asia–Pacific region.

Guangdong surpassed Henan and Shandong to become China's most populous province in January 2005, registering 79.1 million permanent residents and 31 million migrants who lived in the province for at least six months of the year; the total population was 126,012,510 in the 2020 Chinese census, accounting for 8.93 percent of mainland China's population. This makes it the most populous first-level administrative subdivision of any country outside South Asia. The vast majority of the historical province is administered by the People's Republic of China (PRC). Pratas Island in the South China Sea is part of Cijin District, Kaohsiung, Taiwan (ROC); the island was part of Guangdong before the Chinese Civil War.

After the unification of Lingnan region during the Qin dynasty, immigrants from the Central Plains moved in and formed a local culture with a unique style. With the outward movement of the Guangdong people, the Cantonese, Hakka and Teochew languages, music, cuisine, opera and tea ceremonies have spread throughout the nation, Southeast Asia, and other countries. Guangdong was also the birthplace of the father of modern China and the founder of the Republic of China, Sun Yat-sen. He declared a military government there in the Warlord Era. The two special administrative regions of Hong Kong and Macau fall within the scope of Guangdong's cultural influence, and its culture still has profound influences on the Chinese in Singapore and Malaysia, with the vast majority of the Chinese diaspora in the two countries claiming ancestry from Guangdong.

Guangdong is also one of the leading provinces in research and education in China. It hosts 160 institutions of higher education, ranking first in the South Central China region and second among all Chinese provinces/municipalities, after Jiangsu. As of 2025, two major cities in the province ranked in the world's top 20 cities (Guangzhou 6th and Shenzhen 18th) by scientific research output.

== Name ==
"Guǎng" (traditional Chinese: 廣; simplified Chinese: 广; Jyutping: gwong2) means "wide" or "vast" and has been associated with the region since the creation of Guang Prefecture in AD 226. The name "Guang" ultimately came from Guangxin (廣信; 广信), (Note: Jyutping: gwong2 seon3) an outpost established in Han dynasty near modern Wuzhou, whose name is a reference to an order by Emperor Wu of Han to "widely bestow favors and sow trust". Together, Guangdong and Guangxi are called Two Guangs (兩廣; 两广). (Note: pinyin: liǎng guǎng; Jyutping: loeng5 gwong2) During the Song dynasty, the Two Guangs were formally separated as Guangnan East Circuit and Guangnan West Circuit, which became abbreviated as Guǎngdōng Lù (廣東路; 广东路) (Note: Jyutping: gwong2 dung1 lou6) and Guǎngxī Lù (廣西路; 广西路). (Note: Jyutping: gwong2 sai1 lou6)

"Dōng" (東; 东; dung1) means "east".

In Iu Mien, spoken by the Yao ethnic minority, the province is called Gongv Dongv.

"Canton", though etymologically derived from Cantão (the Portuguese transliteration of "Guangdong"), usually by itself refers to the provincial capital Guangzhou. Historically, Canton was also used for the province itself, but often either specified as a province (e.g. Canton Province), or written as Kwangtung in the Wade–Giles system and now most commonly as Guangdong in Pinyin. The local people of the city of Guangzhou (Canton) and their language are called Cantonese in English. Because of the prestige of Canton and its accent, Cantonese can also be used, in a wider sense, for the phylogenetically related residents and Chinese dialects outside the provincial capital.

== History ==
=== Prehistory ===
The Neolithic era began in the Pearl River Delta (珠江三角洲) 7,000 years before present (BP), with the early period from around 7000 to 5000 BP (c. 5050–3050 BC), and the late period from about 5000 to 3500 BP (c. 3050–1550 BC). In coastal Guangdong, the Neolithic was likely introduced from the middle Yangtze River area (Jiao 2013). In inland Guangdong, the Neolithic appeared in Guangdong 4,600 years before present (BP). The Neolithic in northern inland Guangdong is represented by the Shixia culture (石峽文化), which occurred from 4600 to 4200 BP (c. 2650–2250 BC).

=== Imperial ===
Originally inhabited by a mixture of tribal groups known to the Chinese as the Baiyue ("Hundred Yue"), the region first became part of China during the Qin dynasty. Under the Qin Dynasty, Chinese administration began and along with it, reliable historical records about the region. After establishing the first unified Chinese empire, the Qin expanded southwards and set up Nanhai Commandery at Panyu, near what is now part of Guangzhou. The region was later controlled by an independent kingdom known as Nanyue between the fall of Qin and the reign of Emperor Wu of Han. The Han dynasty administered Guangdong, Guangxi, and northern Vietnam as Jiaozhi Province; southernmost Jiaozhi Province was used as a gateway for traders from the west—as far away as the Roman Empire. Under the Wu Kingdom of the Three Kingdoms period, Guangdong was made its own province, the Guang Province, in 226 CE.

Canton was a prosperous port city along a tropical frontier region beset by disease and wild animals, but rich in oranges, banyan, bananas, and lychee fruits. They traded slaves, silk and chinaware with Persians, Brahmans and Malays in exchange for their renowned medicines and fragrant tropical woods. Shi'a Muslims who had fled persecution in Khorasan and Buddhists from India lived side by side in the thriving town each erecting their own houses of worship. A foreign quarter sprang up along the river where many traders of diverse backgrounds including Arabs and Singhalese took up residence.

The port's importance declined after it was raided by Arabs and Persians in 758 and the foreign residents were at times troubled by the corrupt local officials, sometimes responding violently. During one incident in 684, for example, a merchant vessel's captain murdered a corrupt governor who had used his position to steal from the merchant.

Together with Guangxi, Guangdong was made part of Lingnan Circuit (political division Circuit), or Mountain-South Circuit, in 627 during the Tang dynasty. The Guangdong part of Lingnan Circuit was renamed Guangnan East Circuit (廣南東路) in 971 during the Song dynasty (960–1279). "Guangnan East" (廣南東) is the source of the name "Guangdong" (廣東; 广东).

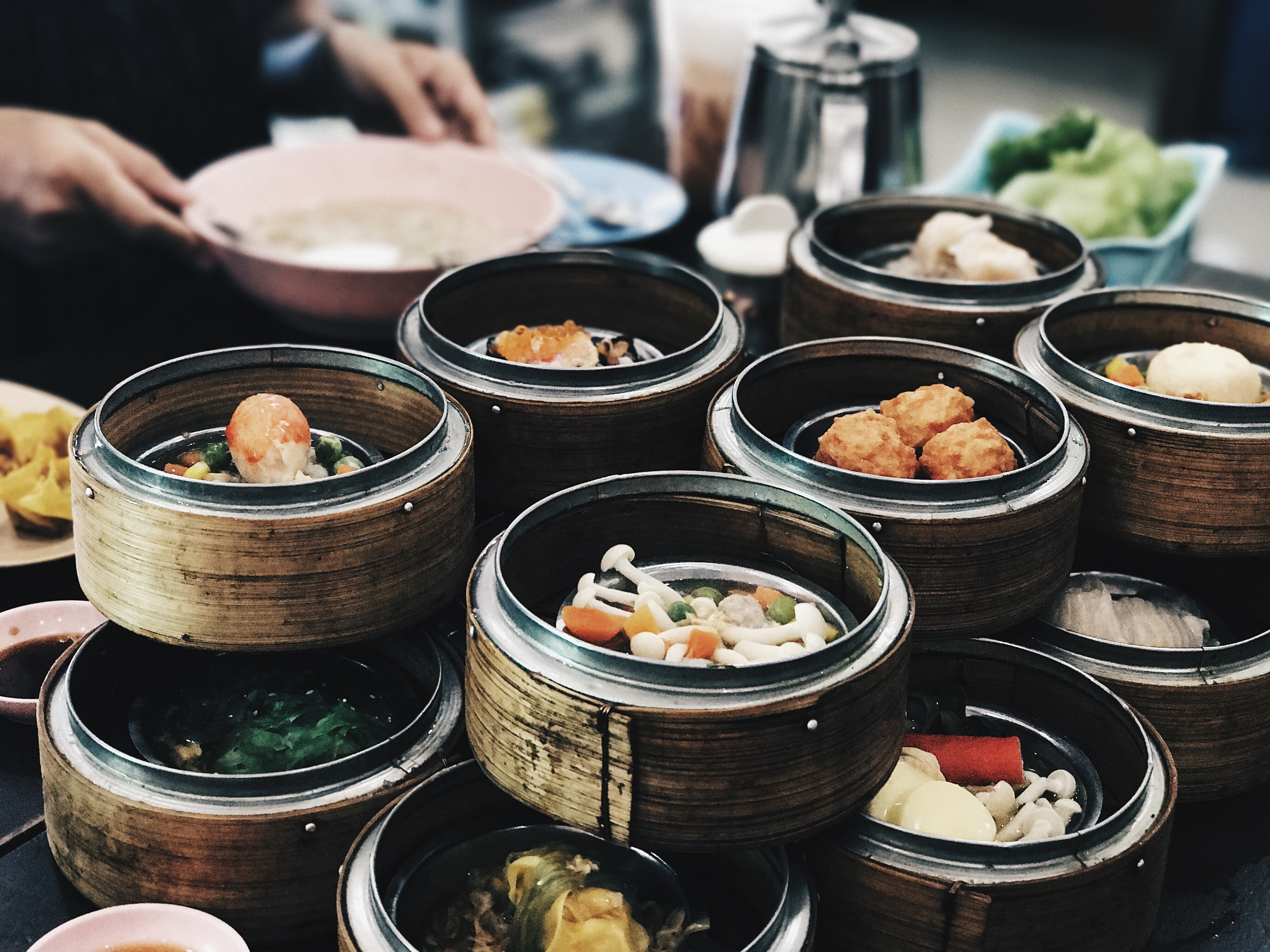
Cantonese food

As time passed, the demographics of what is now Guangdong gradually shifted to (Han) Chinese dominance as the populations intermingled due commerce and state-organized colonization from the late 3rd century BCE, which resettled large numbers of northern soldiers, civilians, and convicts/exiles.Wen, Bo; Li, Hui; Lu, Daru; et al. (2004). "Genetic evidence supports demic diffusion of Han culture". Nature. 431 (7006): 302–305. doi:10.1038/nature02878..). From the fall of the Han dynasty onwards, it shifted more abruptly through massive migration from the north during periods of political turmoil and nomadic incursions. For example, internal strife in northern China following the rebellion of An Lushan resulted in a 75% increase in the population of Guangzhou prefecture between the 740s–750s and 800s–810s. As more migrants arrived, the local population was gradually assimilated to Han Chinese culture or displaced.

As Mongols from the north engaged in their conquest of China in the 13th century, the Southern Song court fled southwards from its capital in Hangzhou. The defeat of the Southern Song court by Mongol naval forces in The Battle of Yamen 1279 in Guangdong marked the end of the Southern Song dynasty (960–1279).

During the Mongol Yuan dynasty, large parts of current Guangdong belonged to Jiangxi. Its present name, "Guangdong" was given in early Ming dynasty.

Since the 16th century, Guangdong has had extensive trade links with the rest of the world. European merchants coming northwards via the Straits of Malacca and the South China Sea, particularly the Portuguese and British, traded extensively through Guangzhou. Macau, on the southern coast of Guangdong, was the first European settlement in 1557.

In the late 18th century and early 19th century, coastal Guangdong came to be severely afflicted by pirates, notably those of the Guangdong Pirate Confederation, around the Pearl River delta particularly. These were suppressed through a joint effort between the Portuguese Navy and Qing forces, however.

Later in the 19th century, the opium traded through Guangzhou triggered the First Opium War, opening an era of Western imperialists' incursion and intervention in China. In addition to Macau, which was then a Portuguese colony, Hong Kong was ceded to the British, and Kouang-Tchéou-Wan (modern day area of Zhanjiang) to the French.

Due to the large number of people that emigrated out of the Guangdong, and in particular the ease of immigration from Hong Kong to other parts of the British Empire (later British Commonwealth), many overseas Chinese communities have their origins in Guangdong and/or Cantonese culture. In particular, the Cantonese, Hakka, Teochew dialects have proportionately more speakers among overseas Chinese people than Mandarin-speaking Chinese. Additionally, many Taishanese-speaking Chinese emigrated to Western countries, with the results that many Western versions of Chinese words were derived from the Cantonese dialects rather than through the mainstream Mandarin language, such as "dim sum". Some Mandarin Chinese words originally of foreign origin also came from the original foreign language by way of Cantonese. For example, the Mandarin word níngméng (simplified Chinese: 柠檬; traditional Chinese: 檸檬), meaning "Lemon", came from Cantonese, in which the characters are pronounced as lìng mung. In the United States, there is a large number of Chinese who are descendants of immigrants from the county-level city of Taishan (Toisan in Cantonese), who speak a distinctive dialect related to Cantonese called Taishanese (or Toishanese).

During the 1850s, the Taiping Heavenly Kingdom, whose leader Hong Xiuquan was born in Guangdong and received a pamphlet from a Protestant Christian missionary in Guangdong, was allied with a local Guangdong Red Turban Rebellion (1854–1856). Because of direct contact with the West, Guangdong was the centre of anti-Manchu and anti-imperialist activity. The generally acknowledged founder of modern China, Sun Yat-sen, was also from Guangdong.

=== 20th century ===
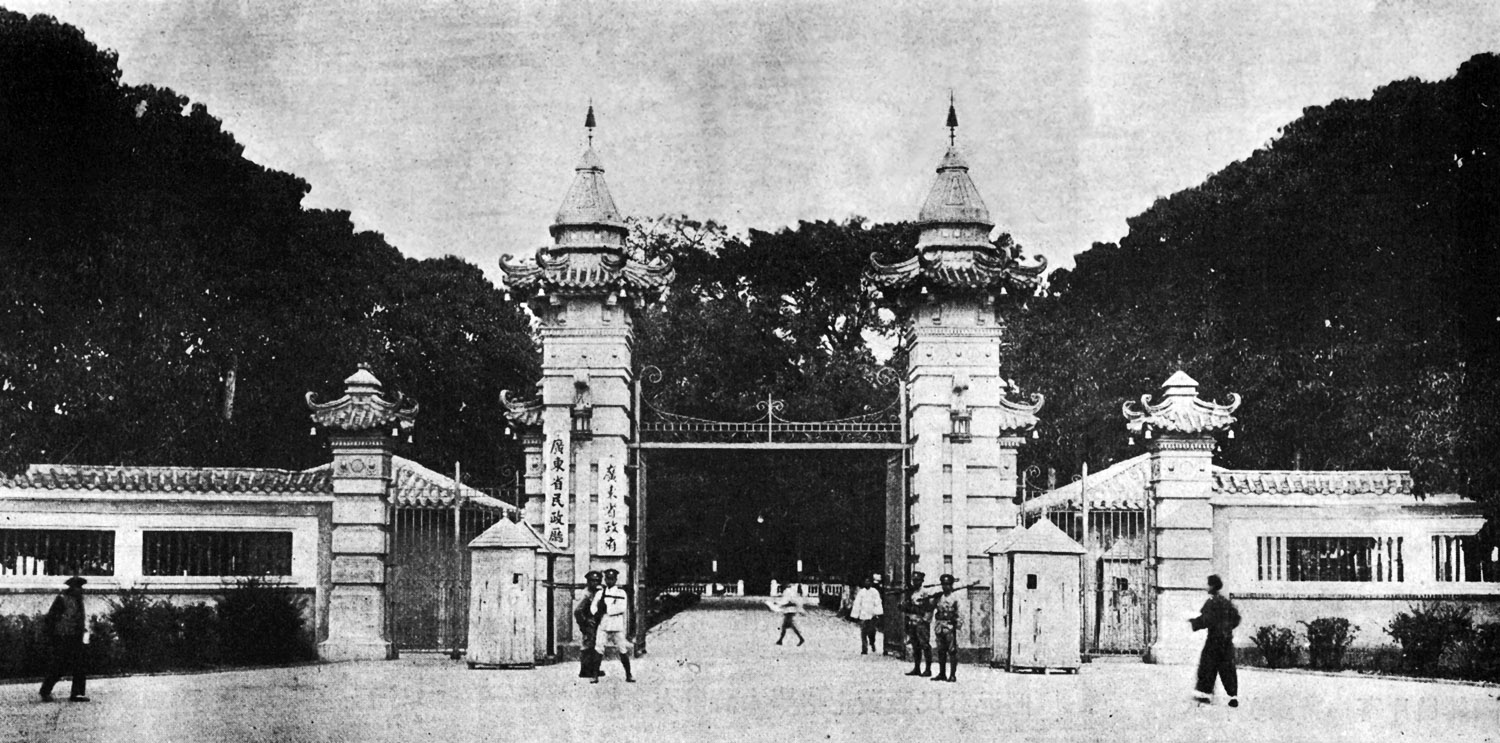
The Kwangtung Provincial Government in the 1930s

During the early 1920s of the Republic of China, Guangdong was the staging area for the Kuomintang (KMT) to prepare for the Northern Expedition, an effort to bring the various warlords of China back under a unified central government. The Whampoa Military Academy was built near Guangzhou to train military commanders.

At the end of the Chinese Civil War Guangdong became one of the Nationalist government's final footholds in Mainland China, with Guangzhou temporarily serving as the Kuomintang's provisional capitol. The People's Liberation Army seized control of the province after the retreat of the government of the Republic of China to Taiwan.

The new Chinese Communist Party administration issued harsh taxes, requisitioning between 22 and 60 percent of grain annually. However, the local party boss Fang Fang tried to moderate Chinese land reform policy in order to protect successful businesses in the Pearl River Delta, landholdings by overseas Chinese seeking to eventually return to the country, and commercial relations with British Hong Kong. In response Mao Zedong purged Fang and thousands of cadres from the province in 1952, sending Tao Zhu to implement a much harsher program under the slogan "Every Village Bleeds, Every Household Fights."

During Reform and Opening Up, Guangdong was supported by the central government to be "one step ahead" of the rest of the country. Most major cities in Guangdong underwent liberalizing economic reforms in the mid-1980s. Since Reform and Opening Up, the province has seen extremely rapid economic growth, aided in part by its close trading links with Hong Kong, which borders it. It is now the province with the highest gross domestic product in China.

In 1952, a small section of Guangdong's coastline (Qinzhou, Lianzhou (now Hepu County), Fangchenggang and Beihai) was given to Guangxi, giving it access to the sea. This was reversed in 1955, and then restored in 1965. Hainan Island was originally part of Guangdong, but it was separated into its own province in 1988.

== Geography ==
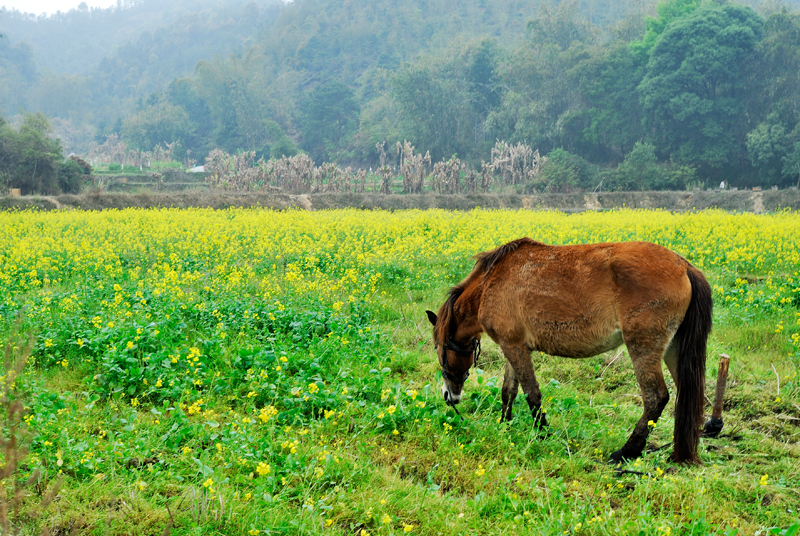
A horse in Hongshan village

Guangdong faces the South China Sea to the south and has a total of 4,300 km (2,700 mi) of coastline. The Leizhou Peninsula is on the southwestern end of the province. There are a few inactive volcanoes on Leizhou Peninsula. The Pearl River Delta is the convergent point of three upstream rivers: the East River, North River, and West River. The river delta is filled with hundreds of small islands. The province is geographically separated from the north by a few mountain ranges collectively called the Nan Mountains (Nan Ling). The highest peak in the province is Shikengkong with an elevation of 6,240 feet (1,900 meters) above sea level. In 2025, researchers confirmed that a mountaintop crater in Deqing County in Guangdong is the result of an impact event estimated to have occurred during the Holocene-era, less than 11,700 years ago. The crater is the largest known impact crater stemming from an impact during the Holocene era.

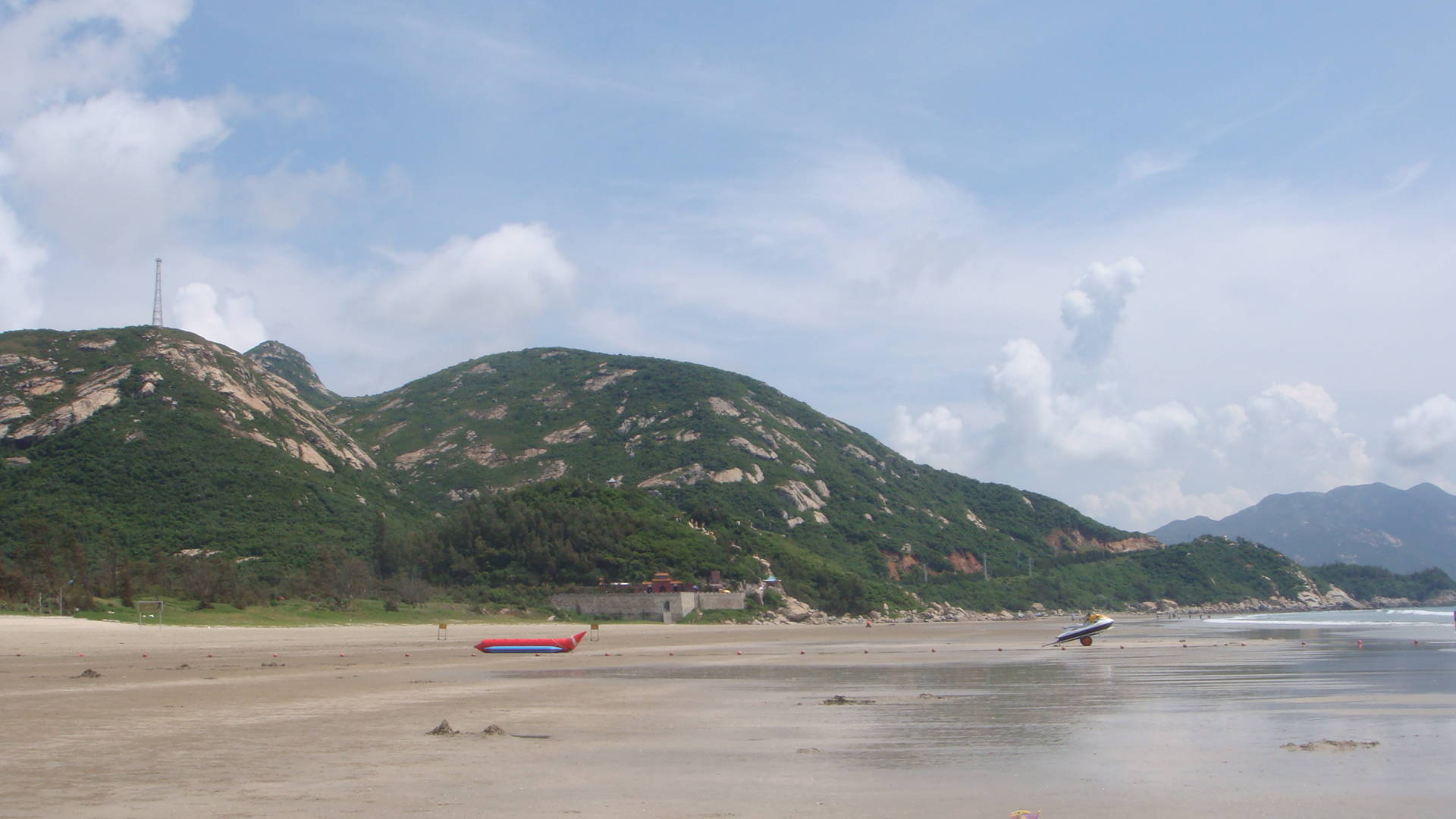
Jiangmen beaches, Guangdong

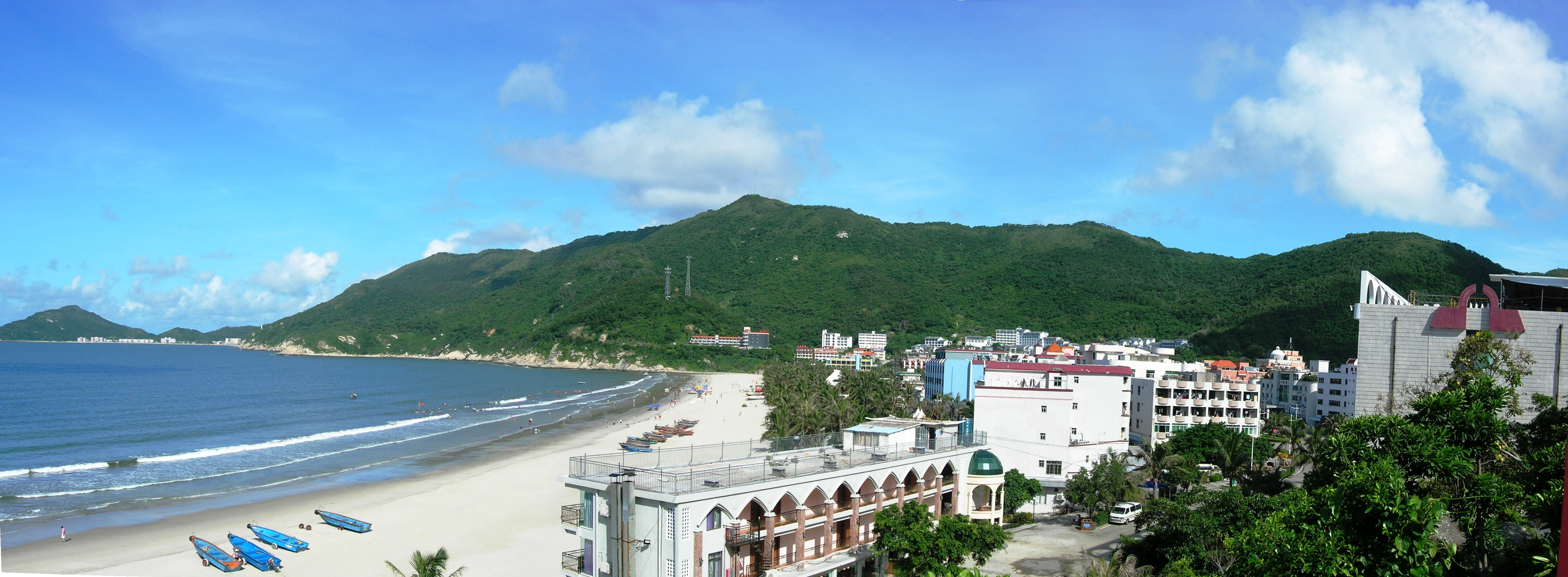
Taishan Xiachuan Island, Guangdong

Guangdong borders Fujian to the northeast, Jiangxi and Hunan to the north, Guangxi autonomous region to the west, and Hong Kong and Macau Special Administrative Regions to the south. Hainan is offshore across from the Leizhou Peninsula. Pratas Island, which were traditionally governed as part of Guangdong, are part of Cijin District, Kaoshiung, Taiwan (ROC). The PRC continues to claim Pratas Island as part of Guangdong under the district of Chengqu, Shanwei.

Cities around the Pearl River Delta include Dongguan, Foshan, Guangzhou, Huizhou, Jiangmen, Shenzhen, Shunde, Taishan, Zhongshan, and Zhuhai. Other cities in the province include Chaozhou, Chenghai, Nanhai, Shantou, Shaoguan, Zhanjiang, Zhaoqing, Yangjiang, and Yunfu.

Guangdong has a humid subtropical climate (Köppen Cfa inland, Cwa along the coast). Winters are short, mild, and relatively dry, while summers are long, hot, and very wet. Average daily highs in Guangzhou in January and July are 18 and 33 °C (64 and 91 °F), although the humidity makes it feel hotter in summer. Frost is rare on the coast but may happen a few days each winter.

== Economy ==
In 2022, Guangdong's GDP was 13.57 trillion RMB ($1.9 trillion in GDP nominal, $3.78 trillion in PPP), with a per capita GDP of CN¥102,465 (US$15,234 in nominal or US$25,016 in PPP). It is the richest province in South Central China region and the seventh richest among all provinces by GDP per capita. Guangdong has been the largest province by GDP since 1989 in Mainland China. Its GDP exceeded that of Australia ($1.70 trillion) and South Korea ($1.67 trillion), the world's 12th and 13th largest economy, respectively. If it was a country, Guangdong would be the 12th-largest economy as of 2022 and the 11th most populous. Compared to country subdivisions in dollar terms, Guangdong's GDP in nominal is larger than all but four country subdivisions: California, Texas, New York State, and England. Compared to country subdivisions in PPP terms, Guangdong's GDP is larger than all, except California. By PPP terms, as of 2022, Guangdong's economy ranked between Turkey and Italy with a GDP of $3.35 trillion and US$3.06 trillion respectively, the 11th and 12th largest in the world respectively.

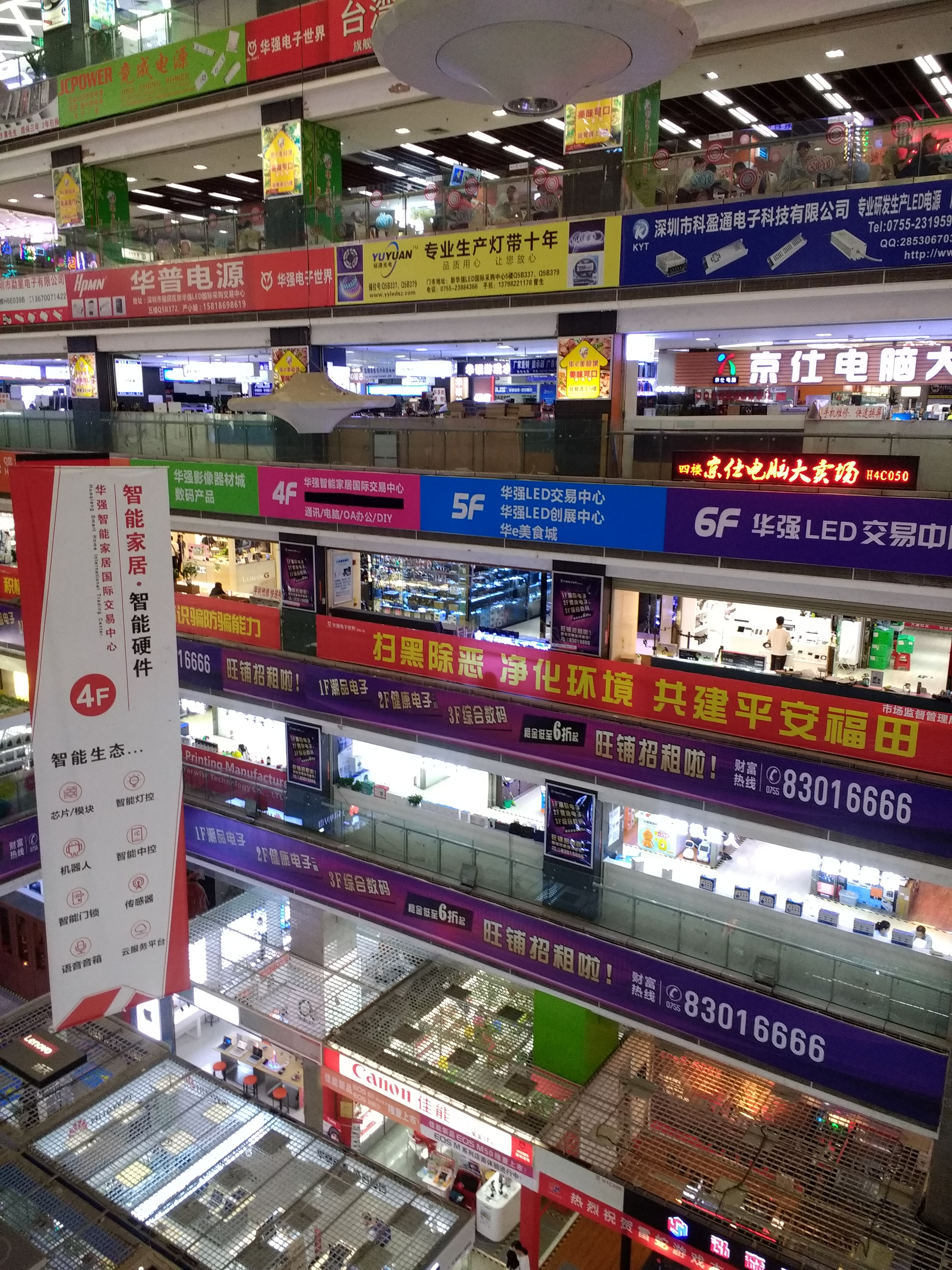
Shops in one of the electronic markets of Huaqiangbei, Shenzhen, specialize in selling various electronic components, supplying the needs of local and global consumer electronics manufacturers.

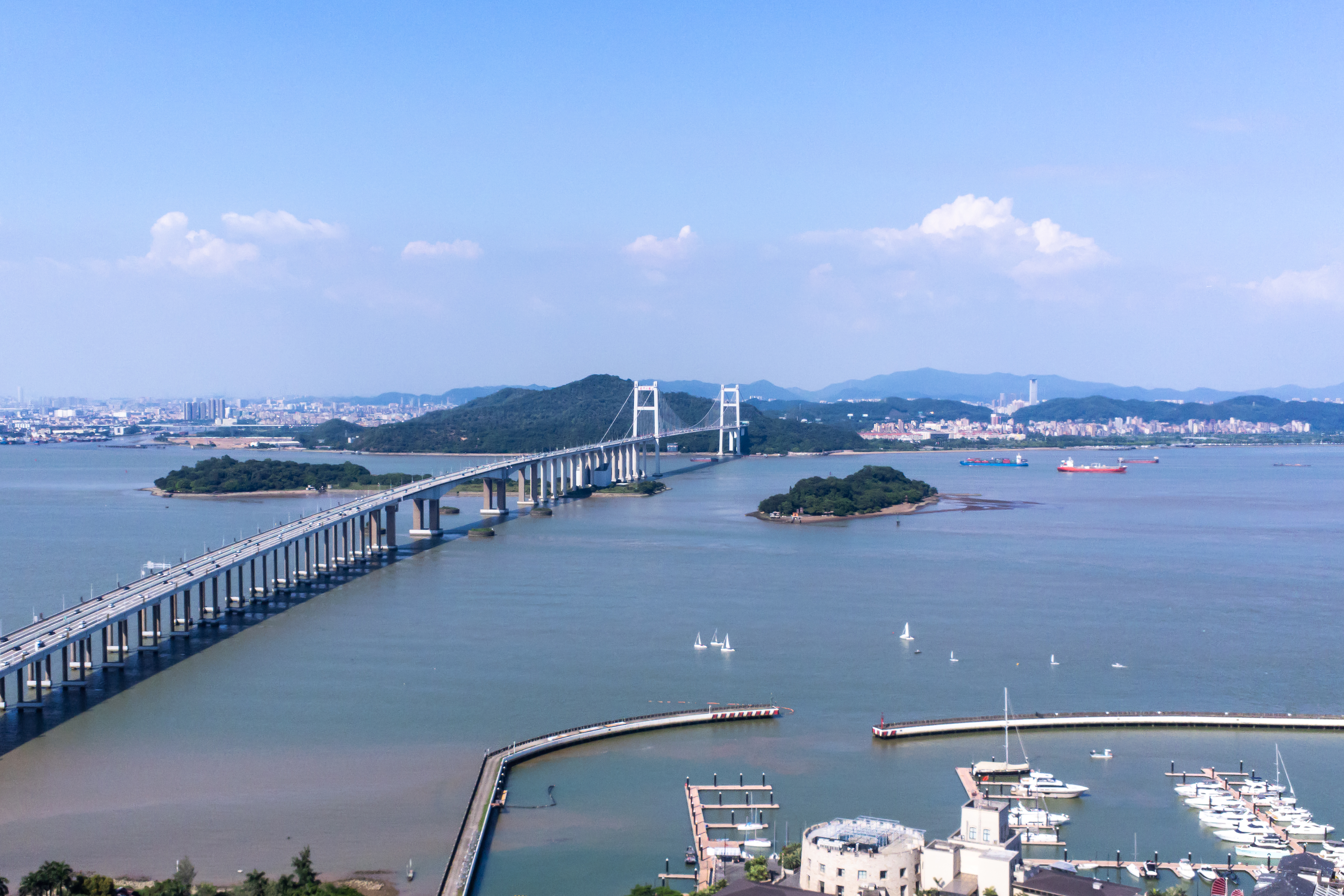
Pearl River and Humen Bridge

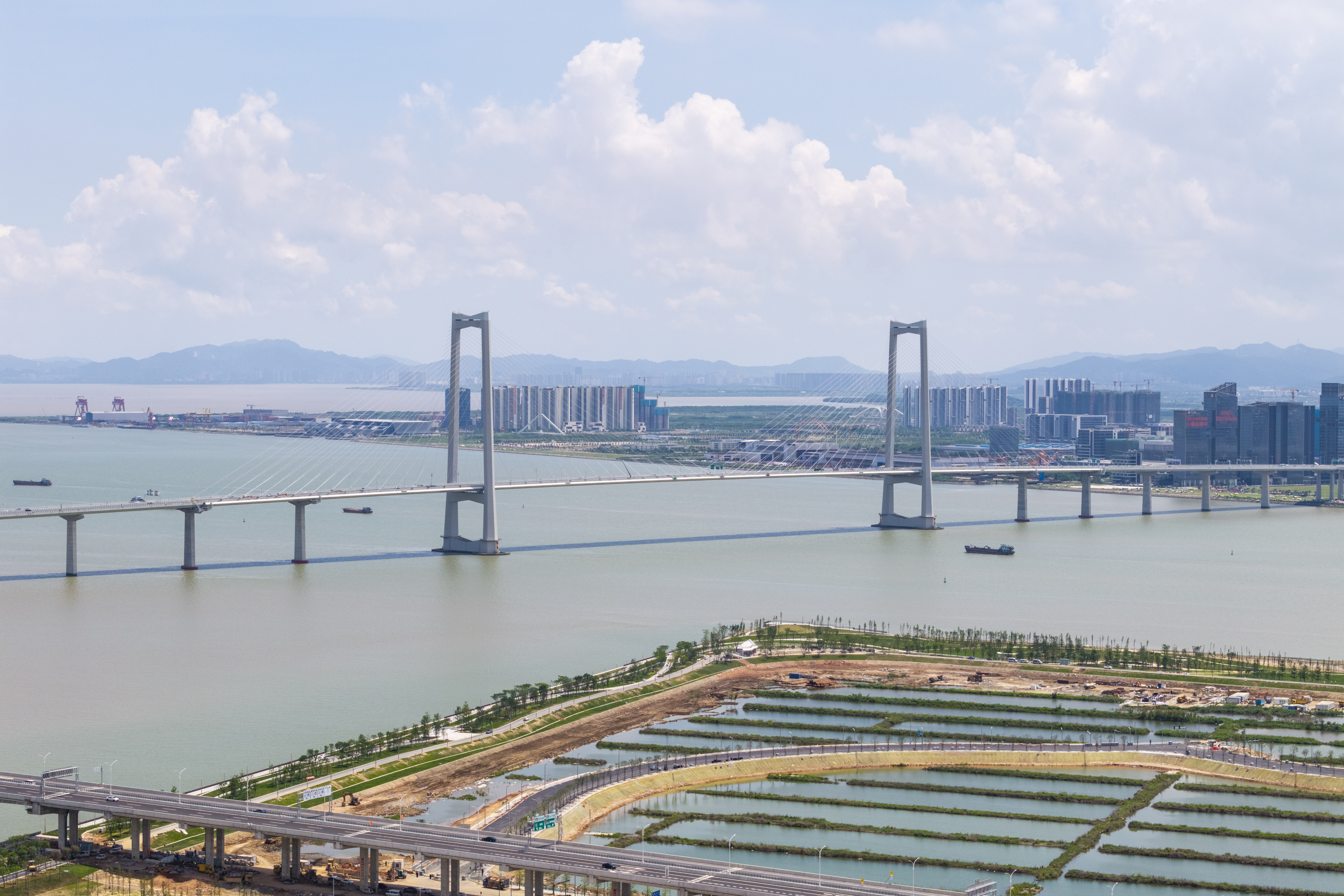
Shenzhen–Zhongshan Link

Historical nominal GDP of Guangdong in the main years (current price, economic census in 2023) purchasing power parity of Chinese yuan, as Intl.dollar based on IMF WEO April 2026
Year	GDP				GDP per capita (GDPpc) based on mid-year population				Reference index		
Year	GDP (million)			real growth (%)	GDPpc			real growth (%)	Exchange rate one foreign currency to CNY		yr-end pop. (thou.)
Year	CNY	USD	PPP (Intl.$)	real growth (%)	CNY	USD	PPP (Intl.$)	real growth (%)	USD	Intl.$ (PPP)	yr-end pop. (thou.)
2025	14,584,676	2,041,842	4,290,620	3.9	113,769	15,928	33,469	3.2	7.1429	3.3992	128,590
2024	14,148,890	1,986,729	4,006,936	3.5	111,033	15,591	31,444	3.0	7.1217	3.5311	127,800
2023	13,790,542	1,957,021	3,783,310	4.9	108,745	15,432	29,833	4.8	7.0467	3.6451	127,060
2022	13,254,711	1,970,638	3,491,849	2.1	104,611	15,553	27,559	2.0	6.7261	3.7959	126,568
2021	12,757,742	1,977,485	3,199,514	8.3	100,820	15,627	25,285	7.4	6.4515	3.9874	126,840
2020	11,370,886	1,648,528	2,832,313	2.4	90,558	13,129	22,557	1.3	6.8976	4.0147	126,240
2010	4,682,130	691,651	1,264,552	12.8	45,521	6,724	12,294	9.8	6.7695	3.7026	104,409
2000	1,095,837	132,373	362,117	11.8	12,993	1,570	4,294	7.4	8.2784	3.0262	86,500
1990	155,903	32,594	81,650	11.6	2,484	519	1,301	9.1	4.7832	1.9094	63,472
1980	24,965	16,661	14,924	16.6	481	321	288	14.8	1.4984	1.6728	52,300

After the communist revolution and until the start of the Deng Xiaoping reforms in 1978, Guangdong was an economic backwater, although a large underground, service-based economy has always existed. Economic development policies encouraged industrial development in the interior provinces which were weakly joined to Guangdong via transportation links. The government policy of economic autarky made Guangdong's access to the ocean irrelevant.

Deng Xiaoping's open door policy radically changed the economy of the province, which was able to take advantage of its access to the sea, proximity to Hong Kong, and historical links to overseas Chinese communities. Guangdong was one of the first provinces to receive permission from the central government to attract foreign investment. Until the 1990s, when China's taxation system was reformed, the province also benefited from preferential fiscal policies and relatively low levels of revenue remittance to the central government because it had historically been classified as an economically less-developed province.

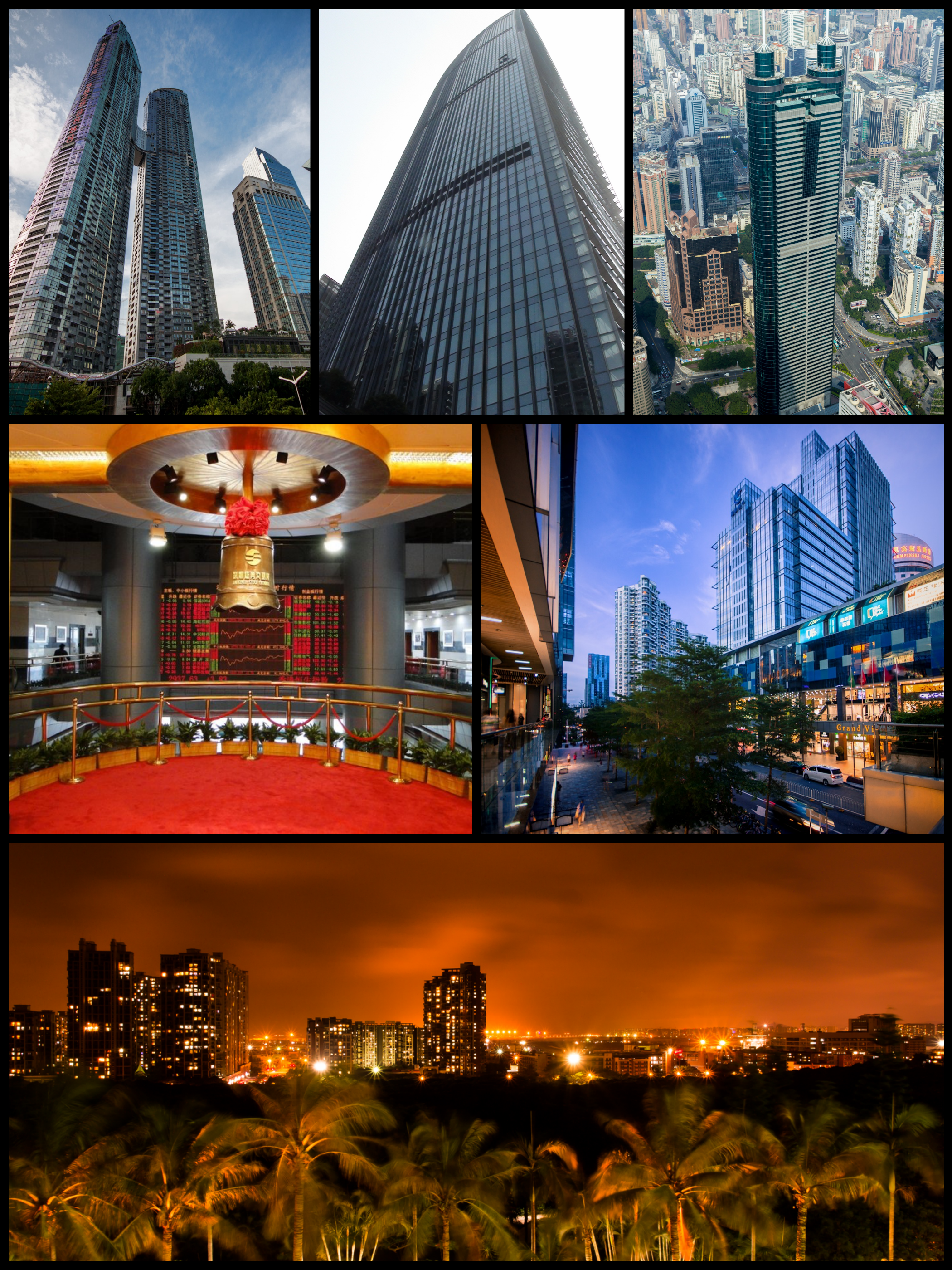
Buildings and tourist attractions in Shenzhen

Guangdong's economic boom began with the early 1990s and has since spread to neighboring provinces, and also pulled their populations inward. The economic growth of Guangdong owes much to the low-value-added manufacturing which characterized (and in many ways still defines) the province's economy following Deng Xiaoping's reforms. Guangdong is not only China's largest exporter of goods, it is the country's largest importer as well.

The province is now one of the richest in the nation, with the most billionaires in mainland China, the highest GDP among all the provinces, although wage growth has only recently begun to rise due to a large influx of migrant workers from neighboring provinces. By 2015, the local government of Guangdong hopes that the service industry will account for more than 50 percent of the provinces GDP and high-tech manufacturing another 20 percent.

In 2021, Guangdong's primary, secondary, and tertiary industries were worth 534 billion RMB (US$79.4 billion), 5.28 trillion RMB (US$785.6 billion), and 7.09 trillion RMB (US$1.05 trillion), respectively. Guangdong contributes approximately 10.6% of the total national economic output. Now, it has three of the six Special Economic Zones: Shenzhen, Shantou and Zhuhai. The affluence of Guangdong, however, remains very concentrated near the Pearl River Delta.

=== Economic and technological development zones ===
- Shenzhen Export Processing Zone
- Shenzhen Futian Free Trade Zone
- Shenzhen Hi-Tech Industrial Park
- Yantian Port Free Trade Zone
- Foshan National New & Hi-Tech Industrial Development Zone
- Guangzhou Development District
- Guangzhou Export Processing Zone
- Guangzhou Free Trade Zone
- Guangzhou Nansha Economic and Technical Development Zone
- Guangzhou Nanhu Lake Tourist Holiday Resort (Chinese Version)
- Guangzhou New & Hi-Tech Industrial Development Zone
- Huizhou Dayawan Economic and Technological Development Zone
- Huizhou Export Processing Zone
- Huizhou Zhongkai Hi-Tech Development Zone
- Nansha Free Trade Zone
- Shantou Free Trade Zone
- Shatoujiao Free Trade Zone
- Zhanjiang Economic and Technological Development Zone (Chinese Version)
- Zhuhai National Hi-Tech Industrial Development Zone
- Zhuhai Free Trade Zone
- Zhongshan Torch High-tech Industrial Development Zone

== Demographics ==
Historical population
Year	Pop.	±%
1912	28,011,000	—
1928	32,428,000	+15.8%
1936–37	32,453,000	+0.1%
1947	27,210,000	−16.2%
1954	34,770,059	+27.8%
1964	42,800,849	+23.1%
1982	59,299,220	+38.5%
1990	62,829,236	+6.0%
2000	85,225,007	+35.6%
2010	104,303,132	+22.4%
2020	126,012,510	+20.8%
2024	127,060,000	+0.8%
Hainan was part of Guangdong until 1988. Guangzhou was part of Guangdong until 1947; dissolved in 1954 and incorporated into Guangdong.

Guangdong officially became the most populous province in 2005. Official statistics had traditionally placed Guangdong as the fourth-most populous province of China with about 80 million people, though an influx of migrants, temporary workers, and newly settled individuals numbered around 30 million. The massive influx of migrants from other provinces, dubbed the "floating population", is due to Guangdong's booming economy and high demand for labor. If Guangdong were an independent nation, it would rank among the twelfth largest countries of the world by population.

Largest cities in Guangdong Source: China Urban Construction Statistical Yearbook 2018 Urban Population and Urban Temporary Population
Rank		Pop.	Rank		Pop.
1	Guangzhou	13,154,200	11	Maoming	849,700
2	Shenzhen	13,026,600	12	Zhaoqing	820,600
3	Dongguan	6,850,300	13	Chaozhou	775,800
4	Shantou	2,796,400	14	Shaoguan	647,300
5	Zhuhai	2,779,800	15	Puning	619,100
6	Huizhou	2,396,400	16	Zhongshan	572,000
7	Foshan	1,872,500	17	Qingyuan	534,200
8	Jiangmen	1,386,500	18	Yangjiang	507,800
9	Zhanjiang	917,800	19	Meizhou	469,500
10	Jieyang	860,000	20	Gaozhou	364,400

=== Urbanization ===
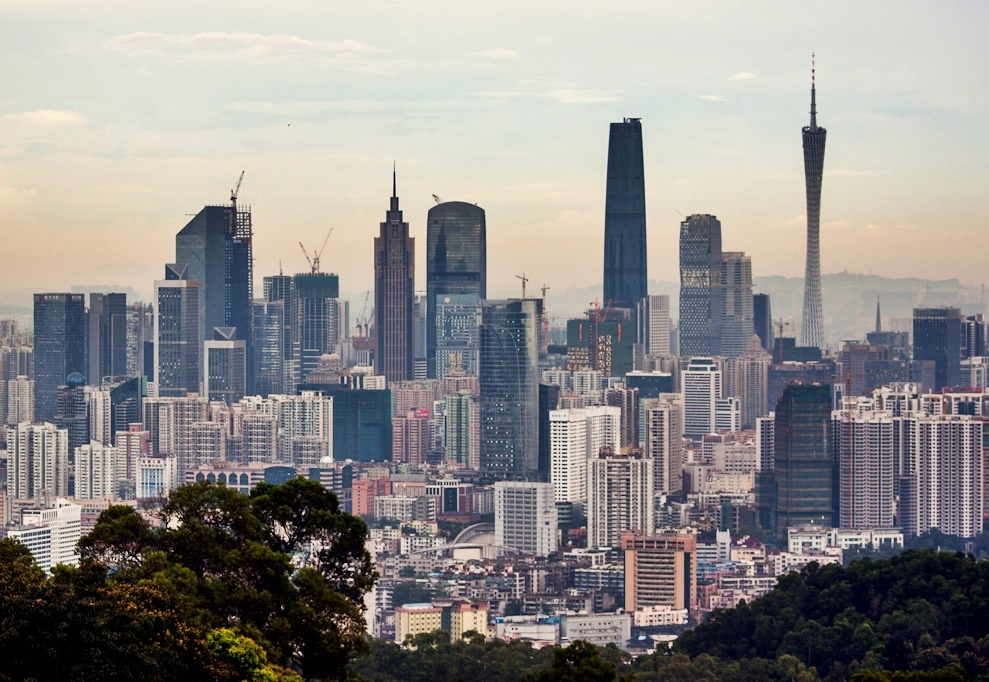
Guangzhou is one of the largest cities in the People's Republic of China.

In 2024, Guangdong's population was 75.9% urban and 24.1% rural.

=== Genealogy ===
Guangdong is the ancestral home of large numbers of overseas Chinese. Most of the railroad laborers in Canada, the Western United States and Panama in the 19th century came from Guangdong, especially the Siyi area. Many people from the region also traveled to California and other parts of the United States during the gold rush of 1849, and also to Australia during its gold rush a decade or so later.

=== Languages and ethnicities ===
The majority of the province's population is Han Chinese, though the Han population is so diverse that the province has been called the "treasure trove of regional languages" (方言寶庫). Within the Han Chinese, the largest subgroup in Guangdong are the Cantonese people, with significant Hakka and Teoswa populations east of the Pearl River Delta. Guangdong is also home to small Mien, She, Hmong, Li, and Zhuang minorities.

==== Yue Chinese ====
Guangdong is the traditional heartland of Yue Chinese (simplified Chinese: 粤语; traditional Chinese: 粵語; pinyin: yuèyǔ; Jyutping: jyut6 jyu5), which has a high degree of internal diversity. The vast majority of these speakers live at or west the Pearl River Delta. A total of 35,810,000 Yue Chinese speakers live in Guangdong.

Cantonese and other Yue varieties spoken at the delta such as Weitou dialect and Shiqi dialect make up the greatest number of speakers, numbering at around 20,720,000 speakers. Due to the large overseas population and cultural impact of Cantopop and Cantonese television shows, Cantonese is a well-known variety of Chinese throughout the world.

Sze Yap or Siyi Yue, including Hoisanese, is spoken in much of Jiangmen prefecture, numbering at around 3,880,000 speakers. Siyi was once the representative variety of Chinese in many Chinese American communities.

==== Hakka Chinese ====
The highlands of the Jiangxi-Fujian-Guangdong tripoint are the traditional heartland of the Hakka Chinese (simplified Chinese: 客家话; traditional Chinese: 客家話; pinyin: kèjiāhuà; Jyutping: haak3 gaa1 waa6; Moiyenese: hag^{5} ga^{1} fa^{4})-speaking people, and Meizhou is often dubbed the capital of Hakka culture. Downhill Hakka migrations started in the early modern period, and due to them being newcomers to the lowlands, they were dubbed "guest families" by the original inhabitants (the Puntis). There are around 20,000,000 Neo-Hakka speakers in Guangdong, of which 2,000,000 live significantly west of the traditional Hakka area.

==== Min Chinese ====
Teoswa or Chaoshan Min (simplified Chinese: 潮汕话; traditional Chinese: 潮汕話; pinyin: cháoshànhuà; Jyutping: ciu4 saan3 waa6; Peng'im: diê^{5} suan^{1} uê^{7}) is spoken primarily in the Chaoshan area, that is to say, Chaozhou, Jieyang, Shantou, and Shanwei prefectures, by around 14,120,000 speakers. It is a Southern Min branch, but is mutually intelligible to a large degree with Hokkien.

Leizhou Min (simplified Chinese: 黎话; traditional Chinese: 黎話; pinyin: líhuà; Jyutping: lai4 waa6; Leizhounese: [lɔi˨ ue˧˥]) is spoken primarily in the Leizhou peninsula of Zhanjiang prefecture by around 4,510,000 speakers. It is closely related to Hainanese.

==== Other Chinese ====
Around 500,000 speakers of Shaozhou Tuhua live in small communities in Shaoguan prefecture, typically surrounded by Hakka speakers. These varieties have been observed to be similar to Hakka, and have been dubbed "Paleo-Hakka" by, for instance, W. South Coblin.

There are also around 40,000 Southwestern Mandarin speakers in Guangdong, with around half of them being remnants of Northern juntun (zh) that date back to the Ming dynasty. These communities largely live in small villages in coastal eastern Guangdong in places such as Haifeng and Huidong counties. The other half live in parts of Lechang close to Hunan province, which explains the Mandarin language they use.

=== Gender ratio ===
Guangdong has a highly unbalanced gender ratio that is among the highest of all provinces in China. According to a 2009 study published in The British Medical Journal, in the 1–4 age group, there are over 130 boys for every 100 girls.

=== Religion ===
Religion in Guangdong (2012)
1. Irreligious or folk religion (90.7%)
2. Buddhism (6.20%)
3. Protestantism (1.90%)
4. Catholicism (1.20%)

According to a 2012 survey only around 7% of the population of Guangdong belongs to organised religions, the largest groups being Buddhists with 6.2%, followed by Protestants with 1.8% and Catholics with 1.2%. Around 90% of the population is either irreligious or may be involved in Chinese folk religion worshipping nature gods, ancestral deities, popular sects, Taoist traditions, Buddhist religious traditions & Confucian religious traditions.

According to a survey conducted in 2007, 43.71% of the population believes and is involved in ancestor veneration, the traditional Chinese religion of the lineages organised into lineage churches and ancestral shrines.

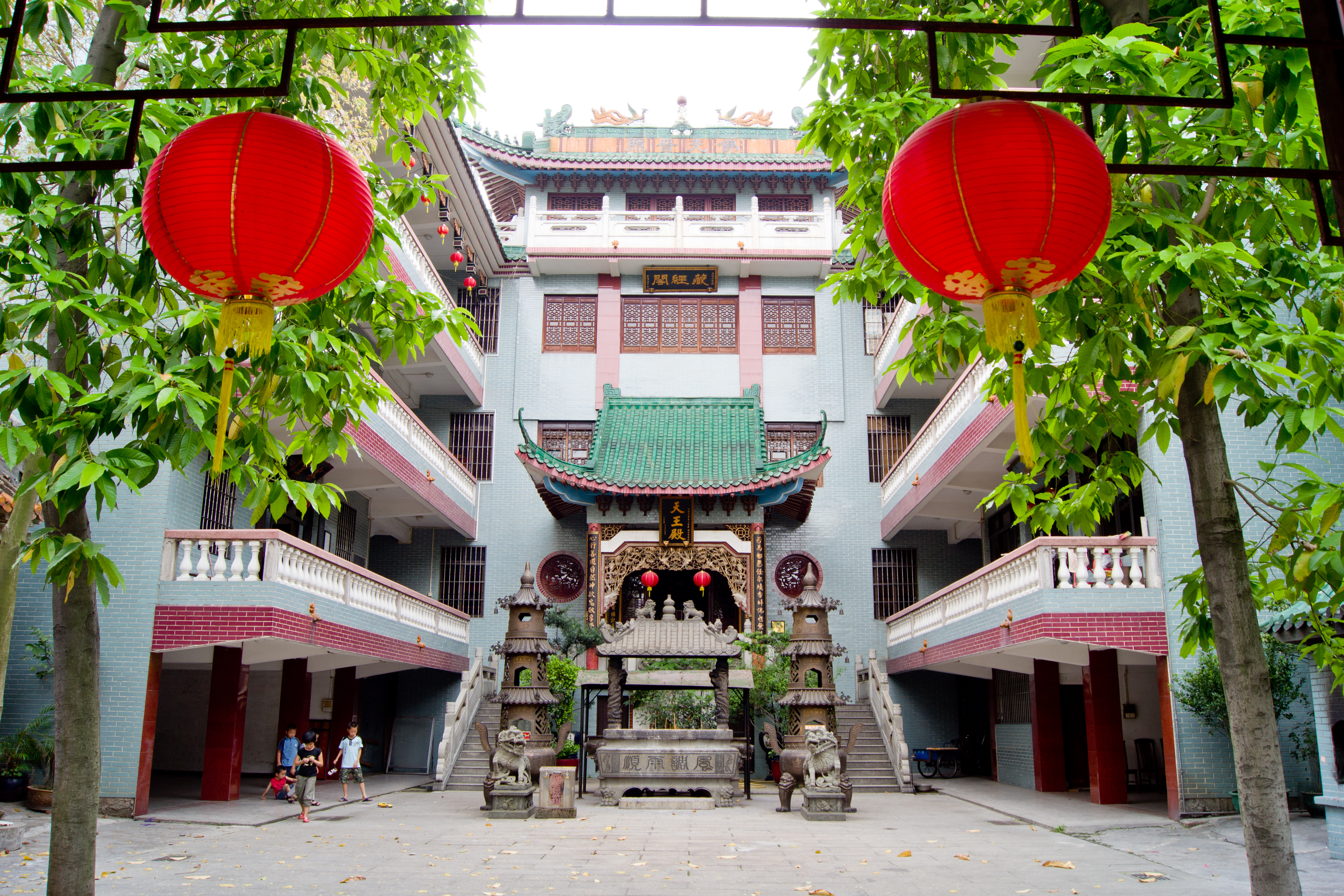
The Buddhist Yuhua Temple in Ronggui, Shunde

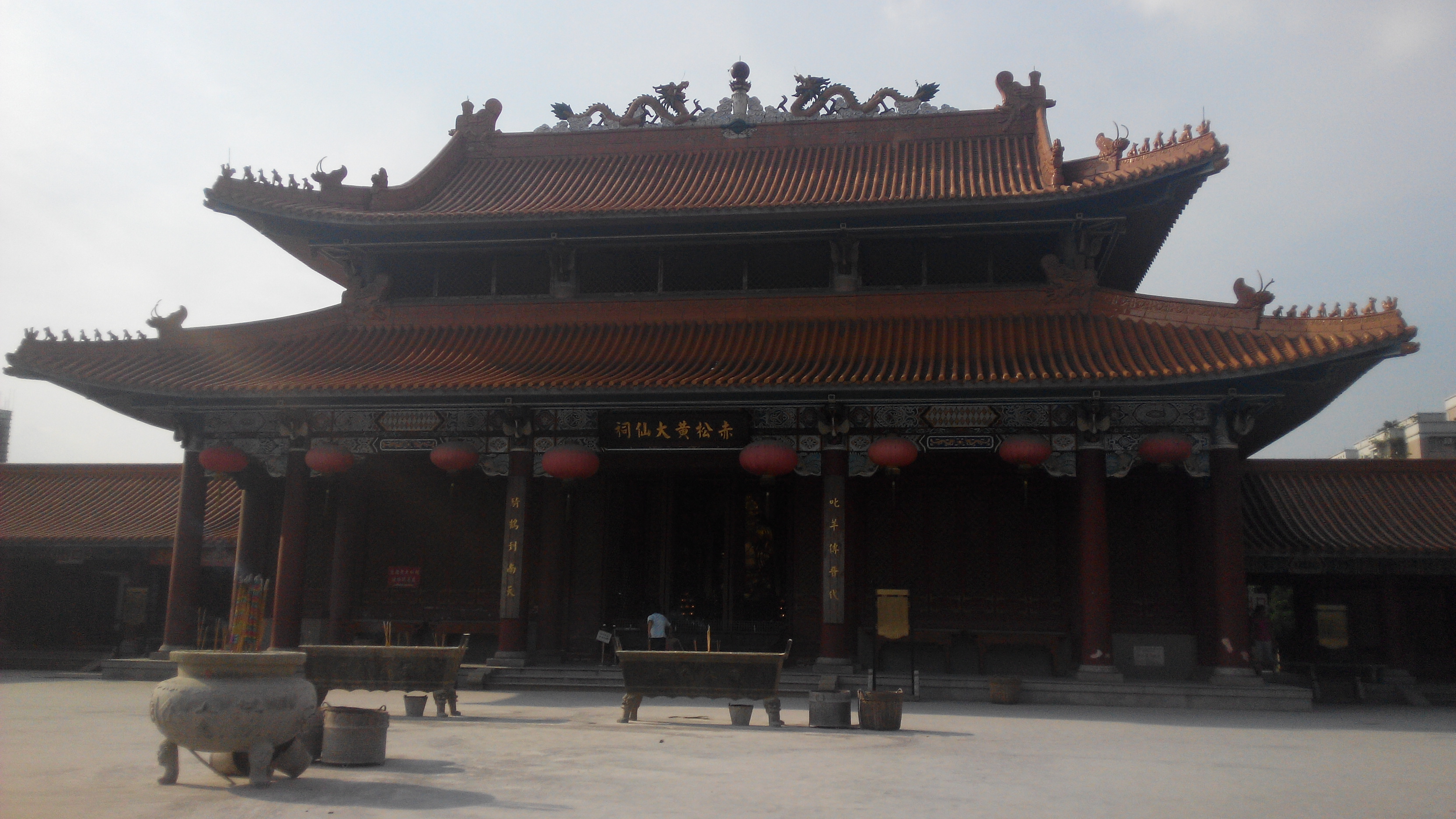
Temple of Huang Daxian in Guangzhou

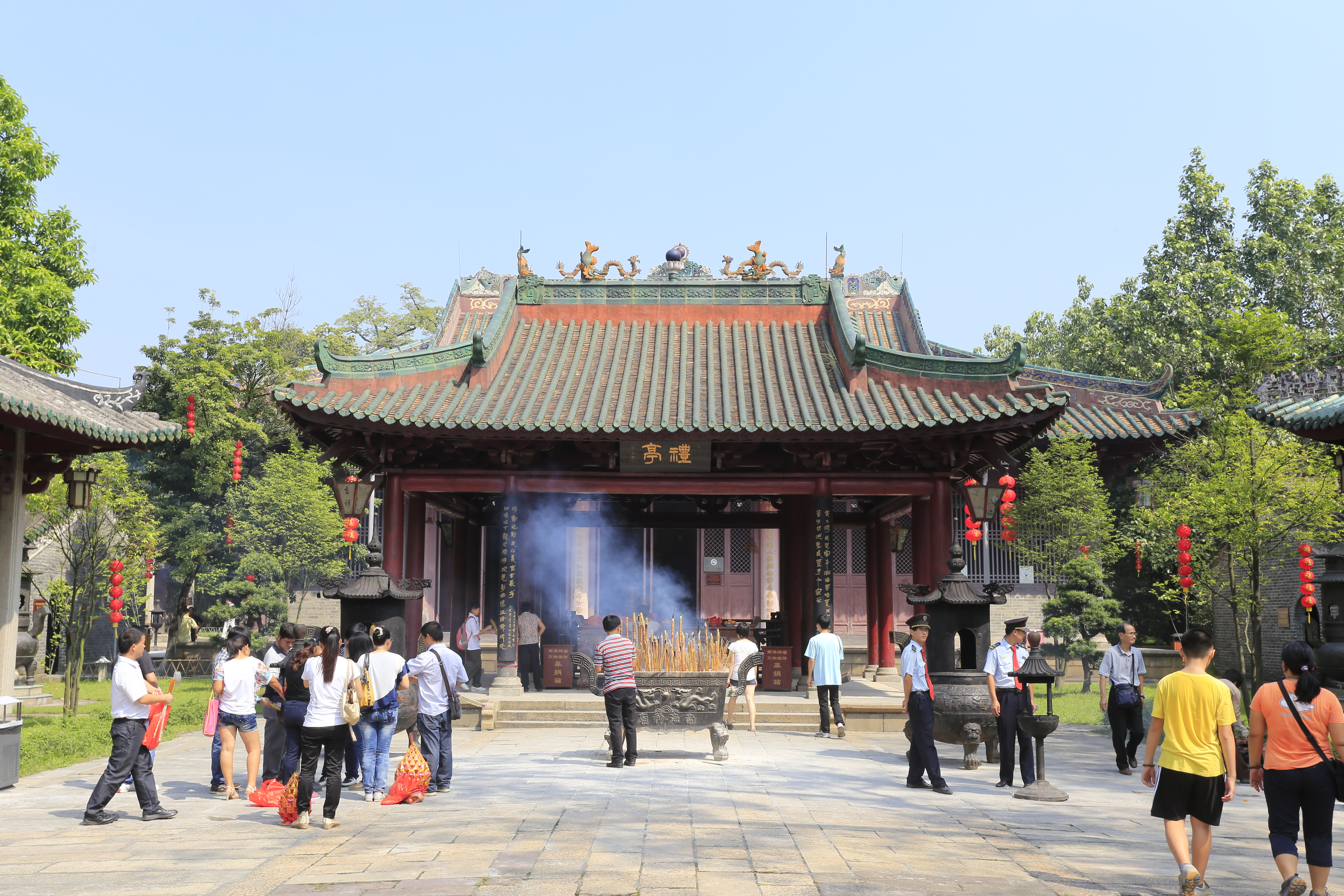
Temple of Nanhaishen (God of the Southern Sea) in Guangzhou

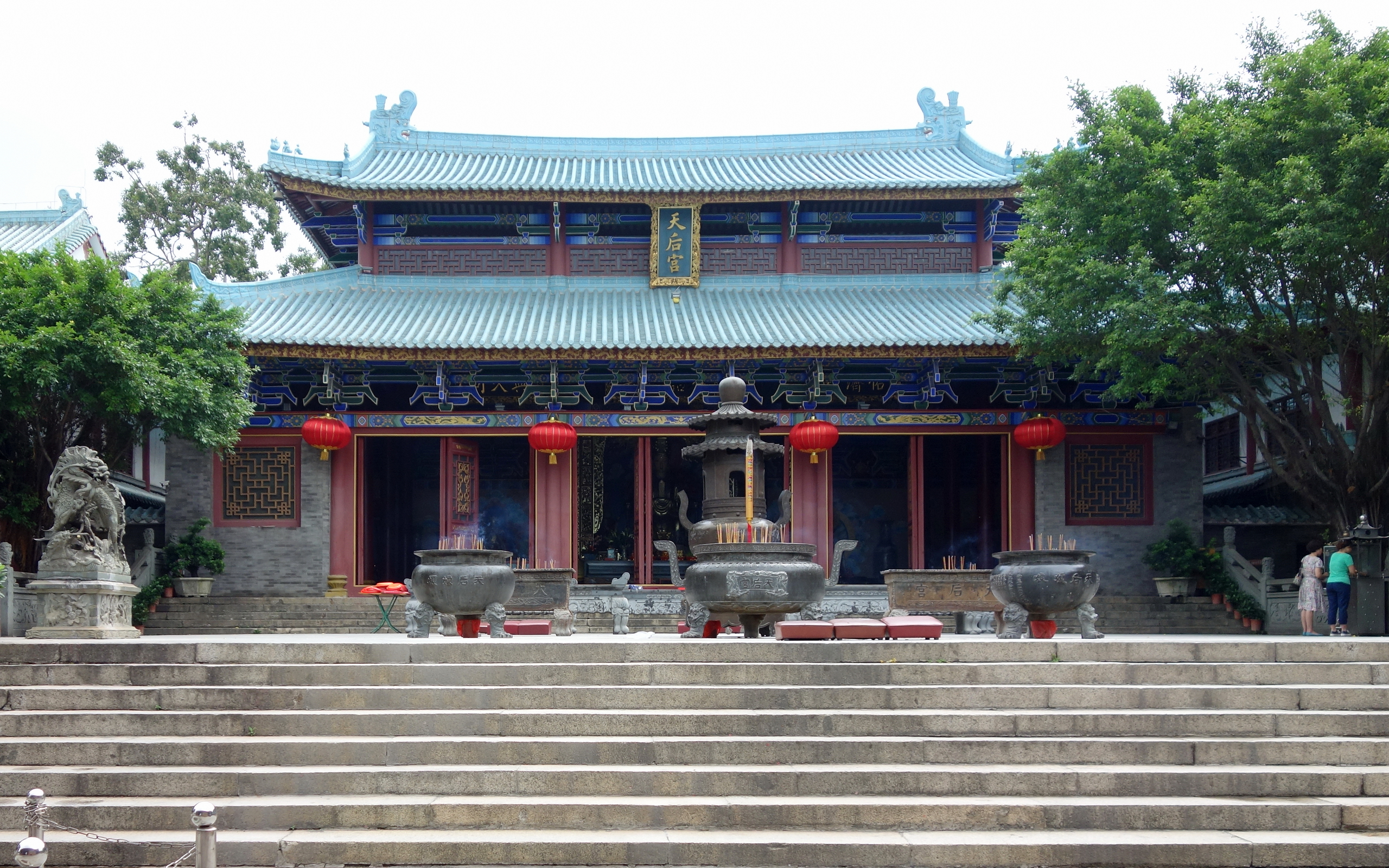
Temple of Tianhou in Chiwan, Shenzhen

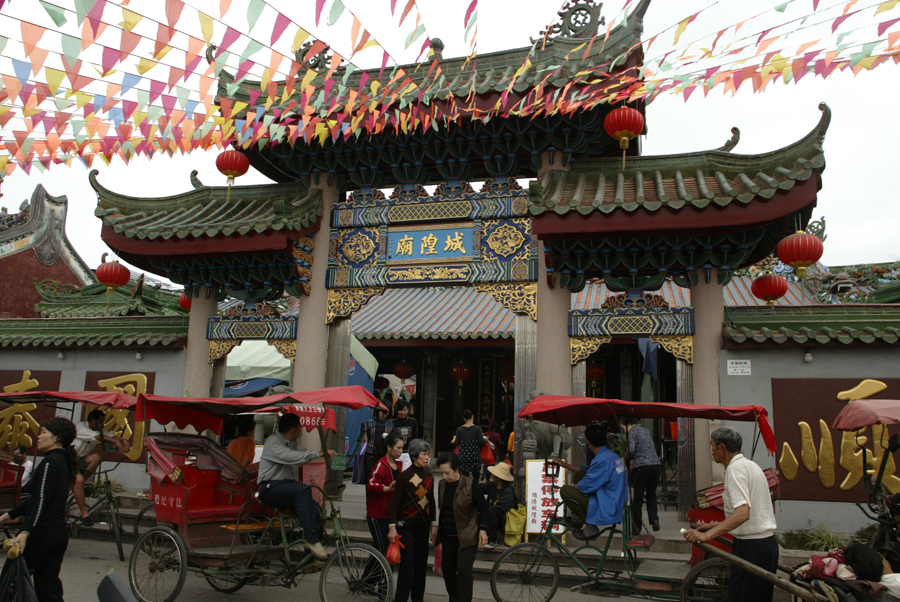
Temple of the Chenghuangshen (City God) of Jieyang

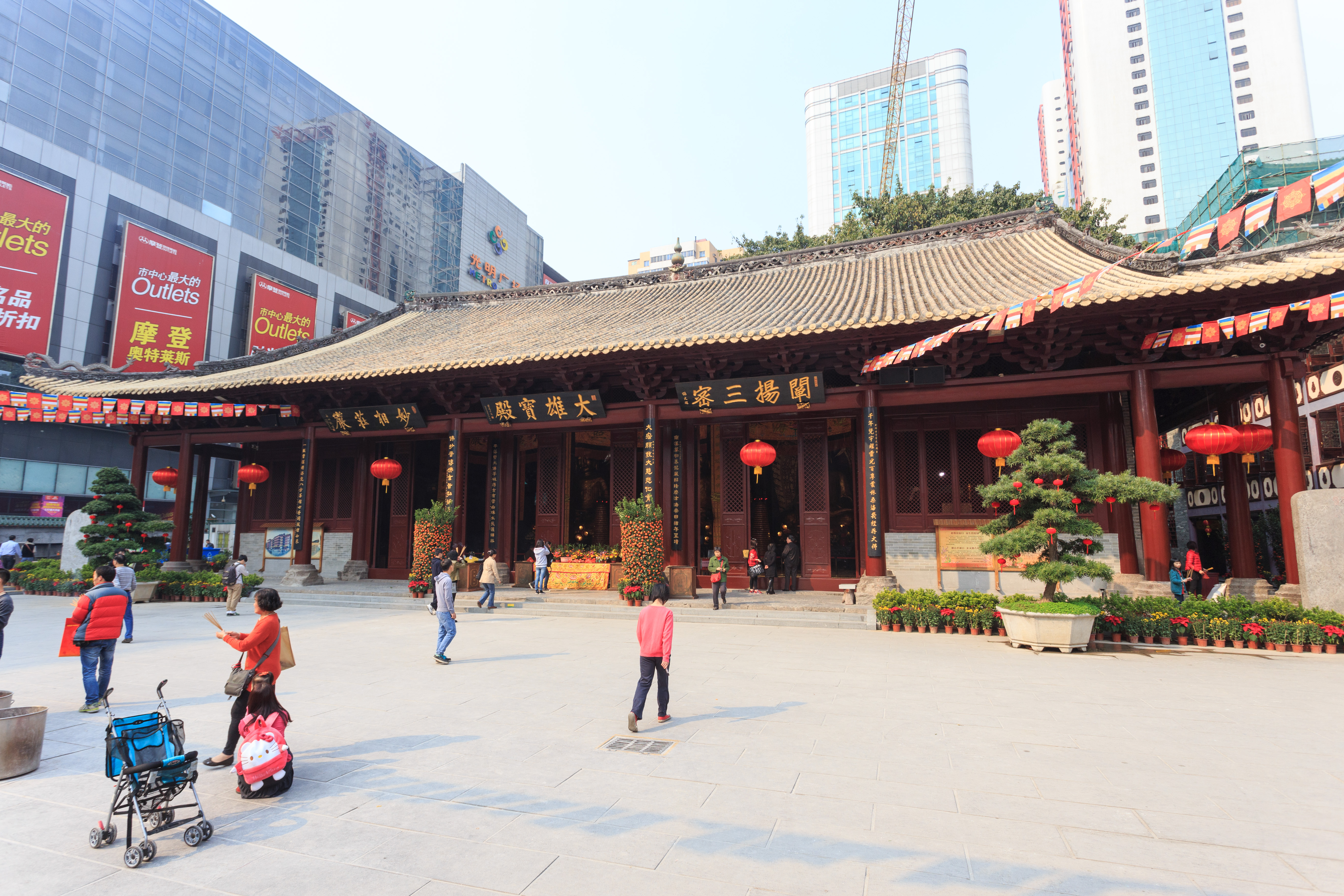
Temple of the Great Buddha in Guangzhou

== Politics ==
Like all governing institutions in mainland China, Guangdong has a parallel party-government system, in which the CCP Guangdong Provincial Committee Secretary outranks the Governor. The CCP Guangdong Provincial Committee acts as the top policy-formulation body, and has control over the Guangdong Provincial People's Government.

=== Law enforcement and emergency services ===
Provincial law enforcement in Guangdong is provided by the Guangdong Provincial Public Security Department. The People's Armed Police Guangdong Corps provides paramilitary law enforcement and disaster relief in the province while the Guangdong Provincial Fire and Rescue Department provides firefighting and rescue services in the province.

The primary domestic intelligence and security agency in Guangdong is the Guangdong Provincial state security department.

Corrections facilities in Guangdong are managed by the Guangdong Prison Administrative Bureau.

=== Dissent ===
According to Freedom House's China Dissent Monitor, Guangdong accounted for 17% of dissent events in the first quarter of 2024 – over 100 events despite heavy Censorship in China. In 2024, Freedom House rated China as below zero on political rights (−2 out of 40).

=== Relations with Hong Kong and Macau ===
Hong Kong and Macau, while historically parts of Guangdong before becoming colonies of the United Kingdom and Portugal, respectively, are special administrative regions (SARs). Furthermore, the Basic Laws of both SARs explicitly forbid provincial governments from intervening in local politics. As a result, many issues with Hong Kong and Macau, such as water rights, have been settled by negotiations between the SARs' governments and the Guangdong provincial government.

== Media ==
Guangdong and the greater Guangzhou area are served by several Radio Guangdong stations, Guangdong Television, Southern Television Guangdong, Shenzhen Television, and Guangzhou Television. There is an English programme produced by Radio Guangdong which broadcasts information about this region to the entire world through the WRN Broadcast.

== Culture ==
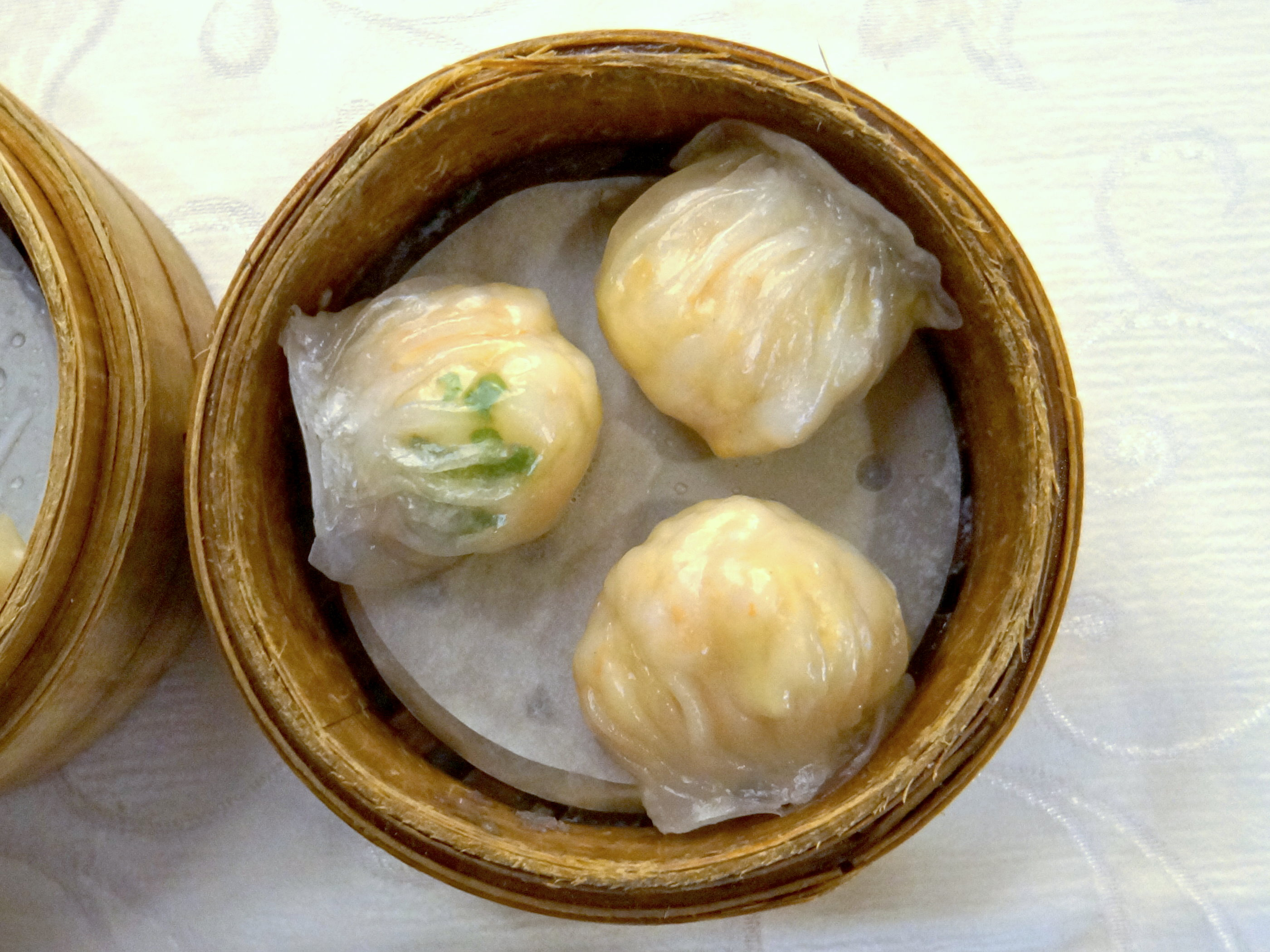
The har gow are classical Cantonese dumplings served as dim sum.

The central region, which is also the political and economic center, is populated predominantly by Yue Chinese (Cantonese) speakers, though the influx in the last three decades of millions of Mandarin-speaking immigrants has slightly diminished Cantonese linguistic dominance. This region is associated with Cantonese cuisine; dim sum is one of these which divides Cantonese food into small portions and is served with in small dishes. Cantonese opera is a form of Chinese opera popular in Cantonese speaking areas. Related Yue dialects are spoken in most of the western half of the province.

The area comprising the cities of Chaozhou, Shantou and Jieyang in coastal east Guangdong, known as Chaoshan, forms its own cultural sphere. The Teochew people here, along with Hailufeng Hoklo people in Shanwei, speak Haklau, which is a Southern Min variety closely related to mainstream Hokkien. Teochew opera is also well-known and has a unique form.

The Hakka people live in large areas of Guangdong, including Huizhou, Meizhou, Shenzhen, Heyuan, Shaoguan and other areas. Much of the Eastern part of Guangdong is populated by the Hakka people except for the Chaozhou and Hailufeng area. Hakka culture include Hakka cuisine, Han opera (simplified Chinese: 汉剧; traditional Chinese: 漢劇), Hakka Hanyue and sixian (traditional instrumental music) and Hakka folk songs (客家山歌).

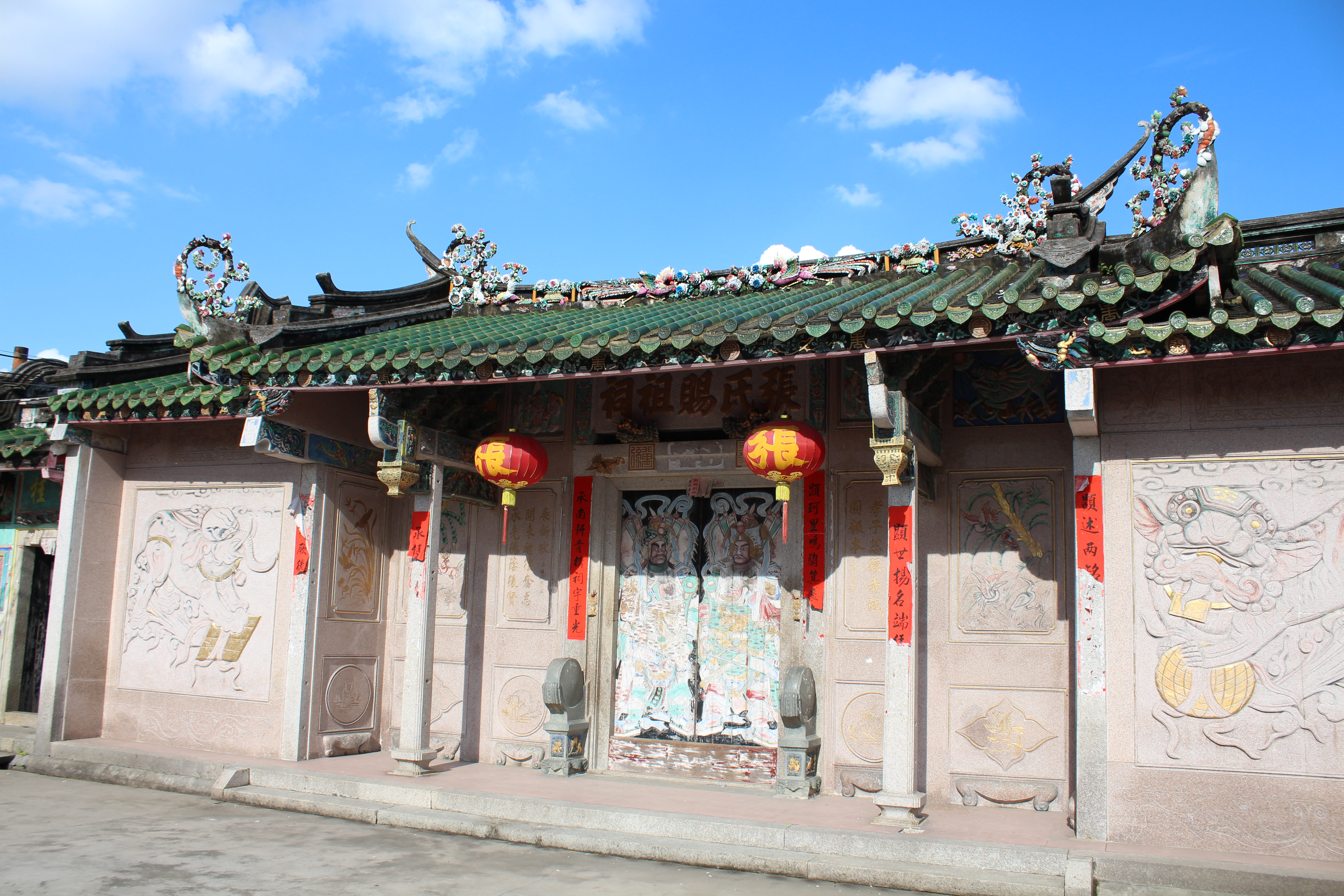
Jieyang architecture

The Tanka people traditionally live on boats throughout the coasts and rivers of Guangdong and much of Southern China.

Zhanjiang in southern Guangdong is dominated by Leizhounese, a variety of Min; Cantonese and Hakka are also spoken there.

Mandarin is the language used in education and government and in areas where there are migrants from other provinces, above all in Shenzhen. Cantonese maintains a strong and dominant position in common usage and media, even in eastern areas of the province where the local languages and dialects are non-Yue ones.

Guangdong is notable for being the birthplace of many Xiangqi (Chinese chess) grandmasters including Lü Qin, Yang Guanlin, and Xu Yinchuan.

== Education and research ==
As of 2022, Guangdong hosts 160 institutions of higher education, ranking first in South Central China region and 2nd among all Chinese provinces/municipalities after Jiangsu (168). Guangdong is also the seat of 14 adult higher education institutions. Many universities and colleges are located in major cities like Shenzhen and Guangzhou. Guangzhou, the capital of Guangdong, hosts 83 institutions of higher education (excluding adult colleges), ranking 1st in South China region and 2nd (tie) nationwide after Beijing. Guangdong Province Department of Education is the department of the provincial government that oversees education.

As of 2025, two major cities in the province ranked in the top 20 cities in the world (Guangzhou 6th and Shenzhen 18th) by scientific research output, as tracked by the Nature Index.

=== Colleges and universities ===
==== National / Double First-Class ====
Guangzhou (7)	Guangzhou Medical University; Guangzhou University of Chinese Medicine; Jinan University; South China Agricultural University; South China Normal University; South China University of Technology; Sun Yat-sen University
Shenzhen	Southern University of Science and Technology

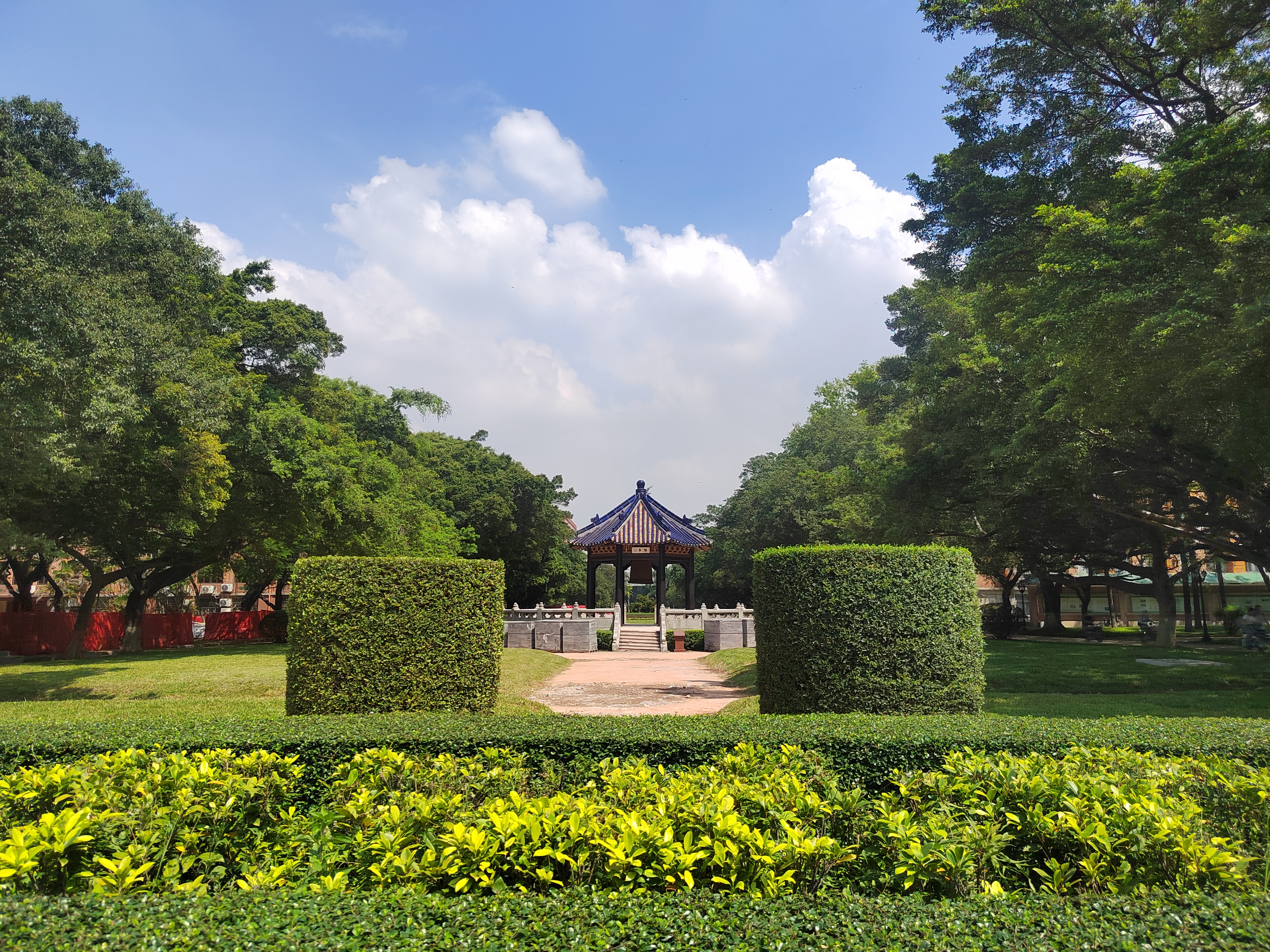
Sun Yat-sen University

==== Provincial ====
- Dongguan Institute of Technology
- Dongguan University of Technology
- Foshan University
- Guangdong Education and Research Network
- Guangdong General Hospital
- Guangdong Institute of Education
- Guangdong Institute of Science and Technology
- Guangdong Medical College
- Guangdong Ocean University
- Guangdong Petrochemical Academy
- Guangdong Pharmaceutical University
- Guangdong Polytechnic Normal University
- Guangdong Radio and TV University
- Guangdong University of Finance & Economics
- Guangdong University of Finance
- Guangdong University of Technology
- Guangzhou Academy of Fine Arts
- Guangzhou Education College
- Guangzhou Normal University
- Guangzhou Sports University
- Guangzhou University
- Hanshan Teachers College
- Huizhou University
- Panyu Polytechnic
- Shaoguan University
- Shenzhen Party School
- Shantou University
- Shenzhen University
- Shenzhen Technology University
- Shenzhen Polytechnic
- Shunde University
- Southern Medical University
- Wuyi University
- Xijiang University
- Xinghai Conservatory of Music
- Zhanjiang Normal University
- Zhongkai University of Agriculture and Engineering
- Zhaoqing University

== Sports ==
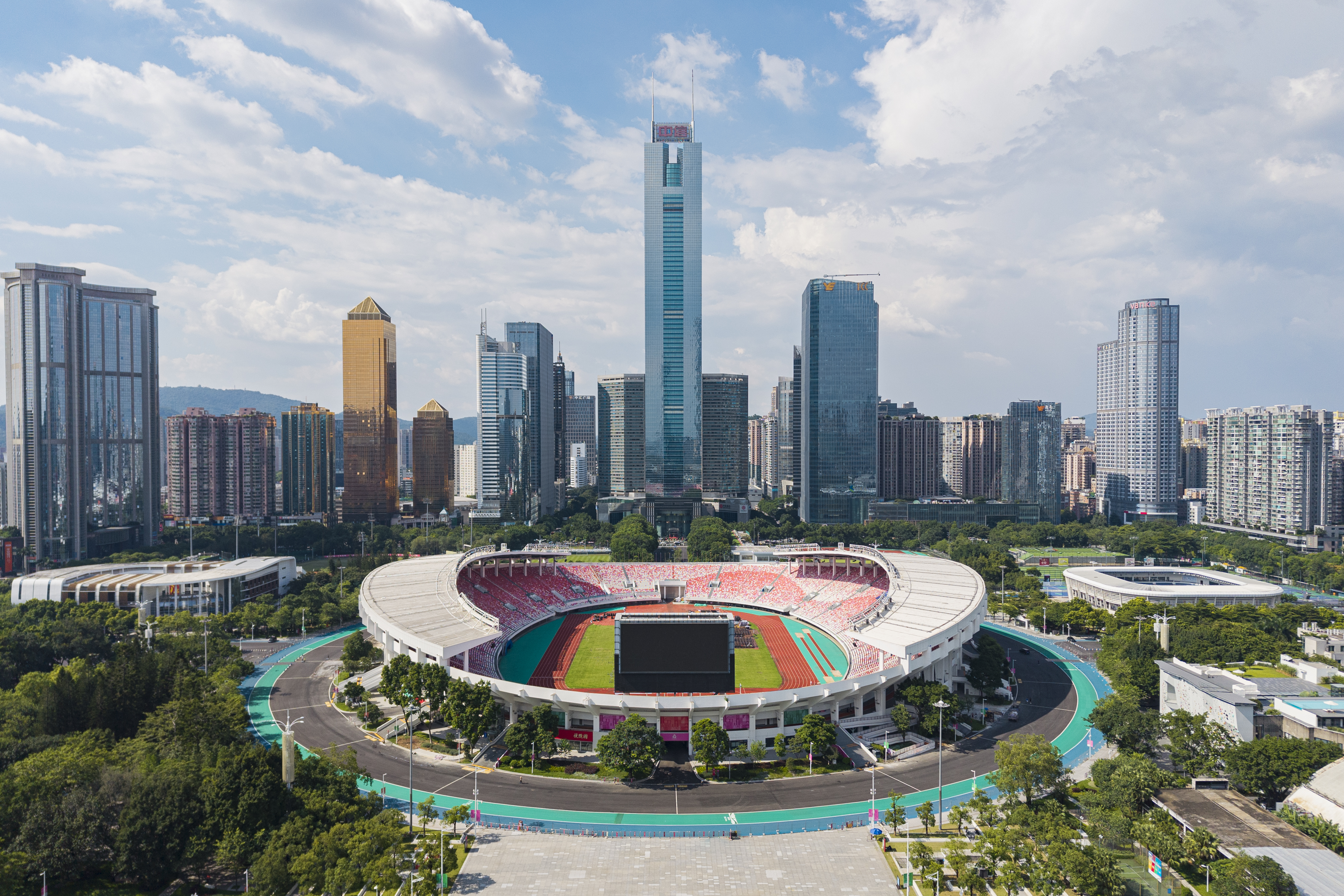
Tianhe Stadium in Guangzhou

List of current professional sports based in Guangdong:

Sport	League	Tier	Club	City	Stadium
Football	Chinese Super League	1st	Shenzhen Peng City	Shenzhen	Shenzhen Sports Center Stadium
Football	Chinese Super League	1st	Meizhou Hakka	Wuhua	Wuhua County Stadium
Football	China League One	2nd	Foshan Nanshi	Foshan	Nanhai Sports Center
Futsal	China Futsal League	1st	Zhuhai Mingshi	Zhuhai	Zhuhai Sports Centre
Basketball	Chinese Basketball Association	1st	Guangdong Southern Tigers	Dongguan	Nissan Sports Centre
Basketball	Chinese Basketball Association	1st	Shenzhen Leopards	Shenzhen	Shenzhen Universiade Sports Centre
Basketball	Chinese Basketball Association	1st	Guangzhou Long-Lions	Guangzhou	Tianhe Gymnasium
Basketball	National Basketball League	2nd	Hefei Yuanchuang	Foshan	
Basketball	Women's Basketball Association	1st	Guangdong Asia Aluminum	Zhaoqing	Zhaoqing Stadium
Volleyball	Men's Volleyball League Div A	1st	Guangdong GSports	Shenzhen	Shenzhen Gymnasium
Volleyball	Women's Volleyball League Div A	1st	Guangdong Evergrande	Shenzhen	Shenzhen Gymnasium
Volleyball	Women's Volleyball League Div A	1st	Shenzhen Phoenix	Shenzhen	
Baseball	China National Baseball League	1st	Guangdong Leopards	Guangzhou	Huangcun Stadium
Table Tennis	China Table Tennis Super League	1st	Shenzhen Bao'an Mingjinhai	Shenzhen	Bao'an Stadium
Esports(Overwatch)	Overwatch League	1st	Guangzhou Charge	Guangzhou	Tianhe Gymnasium

== Tourism ==
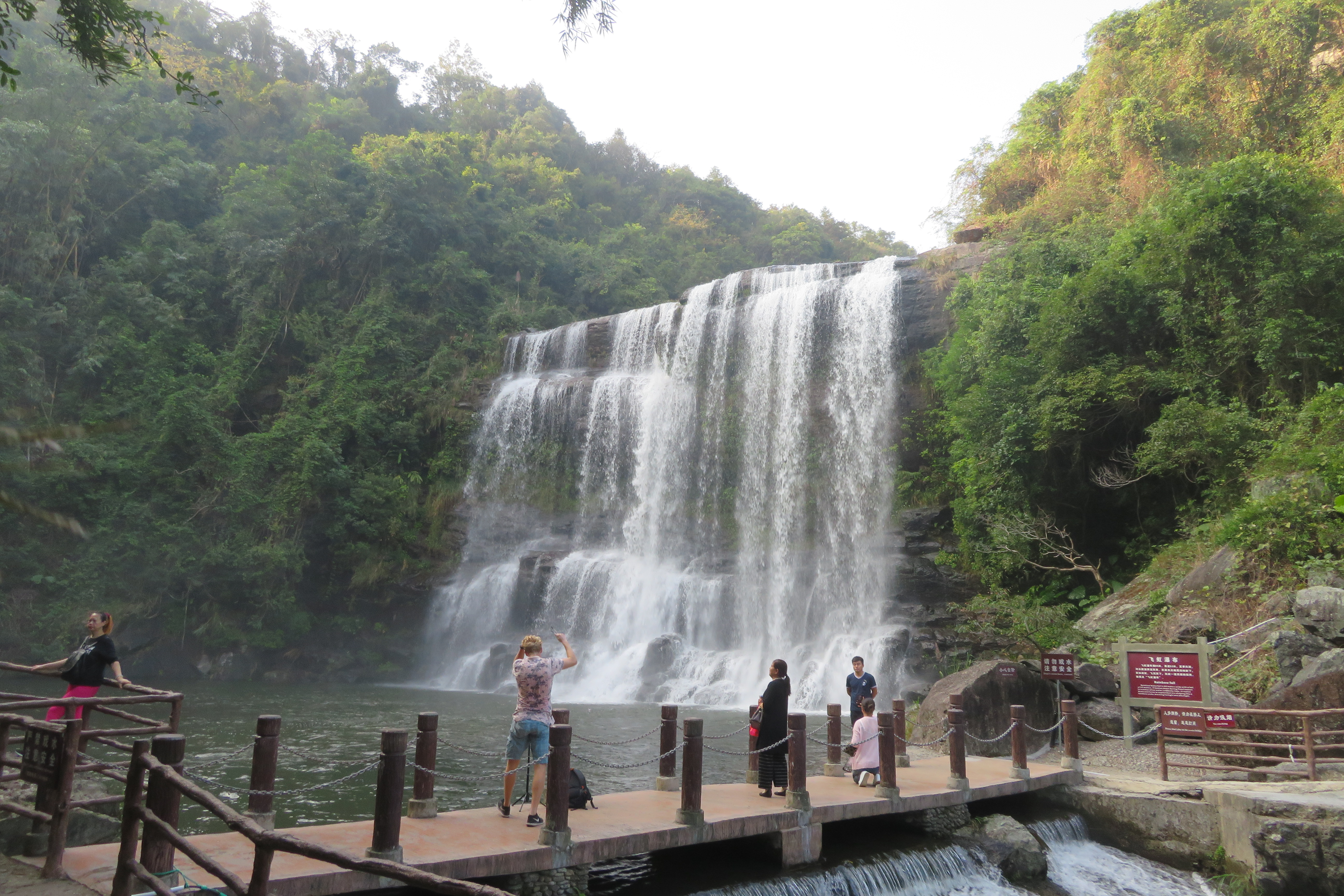
Huangmanzhai Waterfall

Notable attractions include Danxia Mountain in Shaoguan, Yuexiu Hill, Baiyun Mountain in Guangzhou, and Star Lake. Other attractions include Seven Star Crags, Dinghu Mountain in Zhaoqing, the Huangmanzhai waterfalls in Jieyang, and the Zhongshan Sun Wen Memorial Park for Sun Yat-sen in Zhongshan. Shenzhen also features attractions such as Window of the World, Happy Valley Theme Park, Rose Beach, and Xiaomeisha Beach.

== Administrative divisions ==
Guangdong is divided into twenty-one prefecture-level divisions: all prefecture-level cities (including two sub-provincial cities):

Administrative divisions of Guangdong
Division code	Division	Area in km^{2}	Population 2020	Seat	Divisions			
Division code	Division	Area in km^{2}	Population 2020	Seat	Districts	Counties	Aut. counties	CL cities
440000	Guangdong Province	179,800.00	126,012,510	Guangzhou city	65	34	3	20
440100	Guangzhou city	7,434.40	18,676,605	Yuexiu District	11			
440200	Shaoguan city	18,412.53	2,855,131	Zhenjiang District	3	4	1	2
440300	Shenzhen city	1,996.78	17,560,061	Futian District	9*			
440400	Zhuhai city	1,724.32	2,439,585	Xiangzhou District	3			
440500	Shantou city	2,248.39	5,502,031	Jinping District	6	1		
440600	Foshan city	3,848.49	9,498,863	Chancheng District	5			
440700	Jiangmen city	9,505.42	4,798,090	Pengjiang District	3			4
440800	Zhanjiang city	13,225.44	6,981,236	Chikan District	4	2		3
440900	Maoming city	11,424.8	6,174,050	Maonan District	2			3
441200	Zhaoqing city	14,891.23	4,113,594	Duanzhou District	3	4		1
441300	Huizhou city	11,342.98	6,042,852	Huicheng District	2	3		
441400	Meizhou city	15,864.51	3,873,239	Meijiang District	2	5		1
441500	Shanwei city	4,861.79	2,672,819	Cheng District	1	2		1
441600	Heyuan city	15,653.63	2,837,686	Yuancheng District	1	5		
441700	Yangjiang city	7,955.27	2,602,959	Jiangcheng District	2	1		1
441800	Qingyuan city	19,152.90	3,969,473	Qingcheng District	2	2	2	2
441900	Dongguan city**	2,465.00	10,466,625	Nancheng Subdistrict				
442000	Zhongshan city**	1,783.67	4,418,060	Dongqu Subdistrict				
445100	Chaozhou city	3,145.89	2,568,387	Xiangqiao District	2	1		
445200	Jieyang city	5,265.38	5,577,814	Rongcheng District	2	2		1
445300	Yunfu city	7,779.12	2,383,350	Yuncheng District	2	2		1
Sub-provincial cities * – not including the new districts which are not registered under the Ministry of Civil Affairs (not included in the total Districts' count) ** – direct-piped cities – does not contain any county-level divisions

Administrative divisions in Chinese and varieties of romanizations
English	Chinese	Pinyin	Guangdong Romanization
Guangdong Province	广东省	Guǎngdōng Shěng	guong2 dung1 sang2
Guangzhou City	广州市	Guǎngzhōu Shì	guong2 zeo1 xi5
Shaoguan City	韶关市	Sháoguān Shì	xiu4 guan1 xi5
Shenzhen City	深圳市	Shēnzhèn Shì	sem1 zen3 xi5
Zhuhai City	珠海市	Zhūhǎi Shì	ju1 hoi2 xi5
Shantou City	汕头市	Shàntóu Shì	san3 teo4 xi5
Foshan City	佛山市	Fóshān Shì	fed6 san1 xi5
Jiangmen City	江门市	Jiāngmén Shì	gong1 mun4 xi5
Zhanjiang City	湛江市	Zhànjiāng Shì	zam3 gong1 xi5
Maoming City	茂名市	Màomíng Shì	meo6 ming4 xi5
Zhaoqing City	肇庆市	Zhàoqìng Shì	xiu6 hing3 xi5
Huizhou City	惠州市	Huìzhōu Shì	wei6 zeo1 xi5
Meizhou City	梅州市	Méizhōu Shì	mui4 zeo1 xi5
Shanwei City	汕尾市	Shànwěi Shì	san3 méi5 xi5
Heyuan City	河源市	Héyuán Shì	ho4 yun4 xi5
Yangjiang City	阳江市	Yángjiāng Shì	yêng4 gong1 xi5
Qingyuan City	清远市	Qīngyuǎn Shì	qing1 yun5 xi5
Dongguan City	东莞市	Dōngguǎn Shì	dung1 gun2 xi5
Zhongshan City	中山市	Zhōngshān Shì	zung1 san1 xi5
Chaozhou City	潮州市	Cháozhōu Shì	qiu4 zeo1 xi5
Jieyang City	揭阳市	Jiēyáng Shì	kid3 yêng4 xi5
Yunfu City	云浮市	Yúnfú Shì	wen4 feo4 xi5

The twenty-one Prefecture of Guangdong are subdivided into 122 county-level divisions (65 districts, 20 county-level cities, 34 counties, and 3 autonomous counties). For county-level divisions, see the list of administrative divisions of Guangdong.

Population by urban areas of prefecture and county cities
#	Cities	2020 Urban area	2010 Urban area	2020 City proper
1	Shenzhen	17,444,609	10,358,381	17,494,398
2	Guangzhou	16,096,724	9,702,144 (Note: New districts established after 2010 census: Conghua (Conghua CLC) & Zengcheng (Zengcheng CLC). These new districts not included in the urban area count of the pre-expanded city.)	18,676,605
3	Dongguan	9,644,871	7,271,322	10,466,625
4	Foshan	9,042,509	6,771,895	9,498,863
5	Zhongshan	3,841,873	2,740,994	4,418,060
6	Shantou	3,838,900	3,644,017	5,502,031
7	Huizhou	2,900,113	1,807,858	6,042,852
8	Zhuhai	2,207,090	1,369,538	2,439,585
9	Jiangmen	1,795,459	1,480,023	4,798,090
10	Zhanjiang	1,400,709	1,038,762	6,981,236
11	Maoming	1,307,802	637,879 (Note: New district established after 2010 census: Dianbai (Dianbai County). The new district not included in the urban area count of the pre-expanded city.)	6,174,050
12	Chaozhou	1,254,007	448,226 (Note: New district established after 2010 census: Chao'an (Chao'an County). The new district not included in the urban area count of the pre-expanded city.)	2,568,387
13	Jieyang	1,242,906	734,670 (Note: New district established after 2010 census: Jiedong (Jiedong County). The new district not included in the urban area count of the pre-expanded city.)	5,577,814
14	Qingyuan	1,197,581	639,659 (Note: New district established after 2010 census: Qingxin (Qingxin County). The new district not included in the urban area count of the pre-expanded city.)	3,969,473
15	Zhaoqing	1,035,810	559,887 (Note: New district established after 2010 census: Gaoyao (Gaoyao CLC). The new district not included in the urban area count of the pre-expanded city.)	4,113,594
16	Shaoguan	1,028,460	726,267	2,855,131
17	Puning	935,668	874,954	see Jieyang
18	Yangjiang	859,595	499,053 (Note: New district established after 2010 census: Yangdong (Yangdong County). The new district not included in the urban area count of the pre-expanded city.)	2,602,959
19	Meizhou	694,495	353,769 (Note: New district established after 2010 census: Meixian (Meixian County). The new district not included in the urban area count of the pre-expanded city.)	3,873,239
20	Heyuan	662,950	450,953	2,837,686
21	Lufeng	545,474	579,527	see Shanwei
22	Gaozhou	490,301	352,006	see Maoming
23	Huazhou	472,746	320,418	see Maoming
24	Sihui	452,536	355,709	see Zhaoqing
25	Lianjiang	443,812	359,225	see Zhanjiang
26	Taishan	433,266	394,855	see Jiangmen
27	Kaiping	430,035	371,019	see Jiangmen
28	Xinyi	418,731	333,965	see Maoming
29	Leizhou	412,291	344,043	see Zhanjiang
30	Yingde	398,066	346,927	see Qingyuan
31	Wuchuan	388,714	332,672	see Zhanjiang
32	Yunfu	380,044	242,040 (Note: New district established after 2010 census: Yun'an (Yun'an County). The new district not included in the urban area count of the pre-expanded city.)	2,383,350
33	Xingning	365,661	392,000	see Meizhou
34	Yangchun	360,359	287,391	see Yangjiang
35	Shanwei	345,373	370,608	2,738,482
36	Heshan	334,432	282,580	see Jiangmen
37	Luoding	317,060	263,338	see Yunfu
38	Enping	251,742	244,257	see Jiangmen
39	Lechang	199,438	191,457	see Shaoguan
40	Lianzhou	176,572	161,667	see Qingyuan
41	Nanxiong	171,215	140,017	see Shaoguan
—	Zengcheng	see Guangzhou	710,146	see Guangzhou
—	Conghua	see Guangzhou	229,118	see Guangzhou
—	Gaoyao	see Zhaoqing	224,755	see Zhaoqing

== International relations ==
Guangdong is twinned with:

- Aichi Prefecture, Japan
- Hawaii, United States
- New South Wales, Australia
- Gujarat, India
- California, United States

== See also ==
- Major national historical and cultural sites in Guangdong

== Sources ==
- Economic profile for Guangdong at the Hong Kong Trade Development Council
