= Guangdong Polytechnic of Science and Technology =

Provincial public vocational college in Guangzhou, Guangdong, China

Coordinates: 23.144649°N 113.363252°E

- 广东科学技术职业学院 (Chinese)
- Type: Public university
- Established: 1985
- Location: Guangzhou, Guangdong, China
- Colors
- Website: www.gdit.edu.cn

Chinese name
- Simplified Chinese: 广东科学技术职业学院
- Traditional Chinese: 廣東科學技術職業學院院
Transcriptions
Standard Mandarin
- Hanyu Pinyin: Guǎngdōng Kēxué Jìshù Zhíyè Xuéyuàn

The Guangdong Polytechnic of Science and Technology (Chinese: 广东科学技术职业学院; lit. 'Guangdong Science and Technology Vocational College') is a provincial public vocational college in Guangzhou, Guangdong, China.

The college was established in 1985 by the provincial government.
