= Huangmanzhai waterfalls =

Waterfalls in Guangdong, China

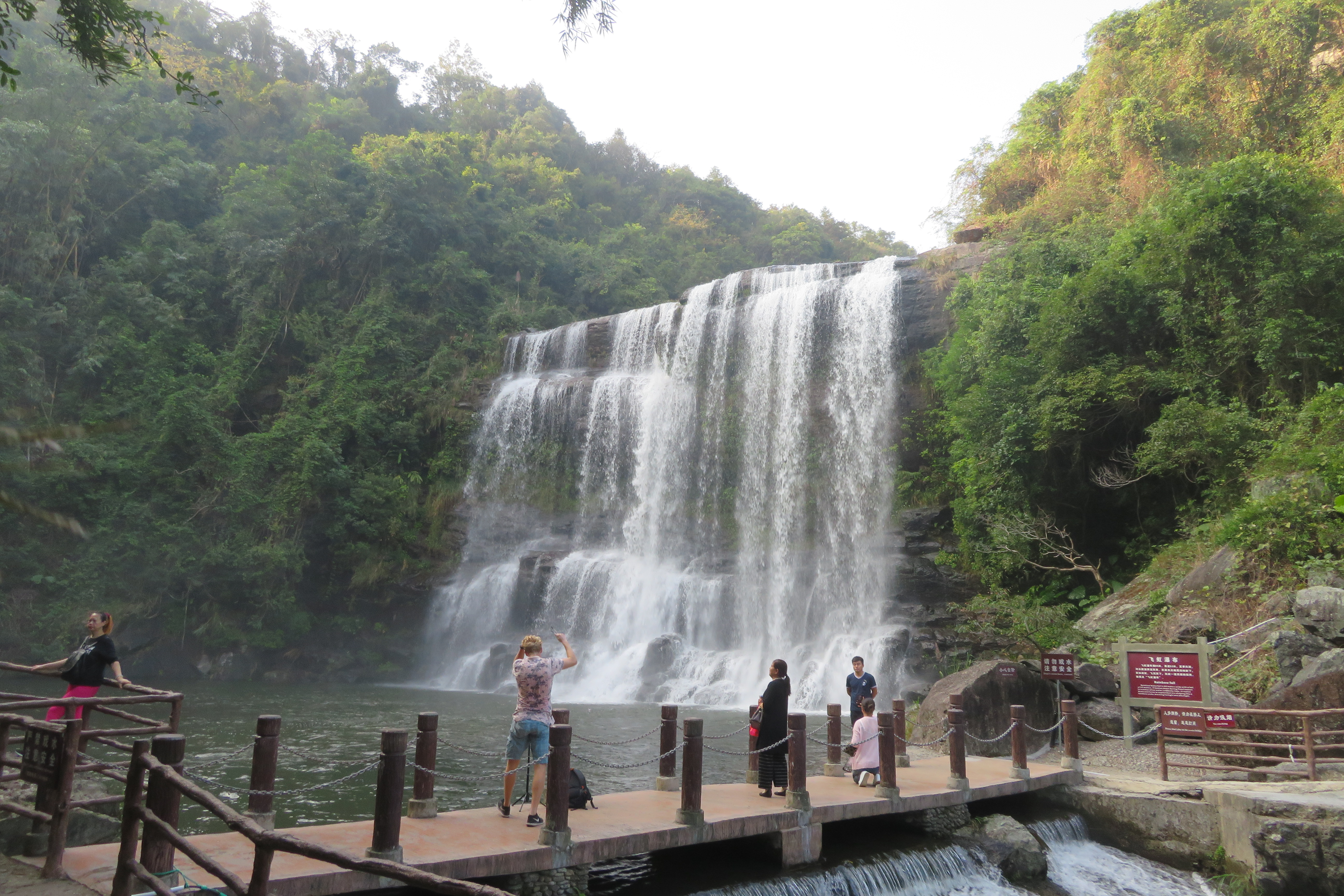
- The top waterfall (Rainbow fall, Feihong fall)
- Interactive map of Huangmanzhai waterfalls
- Location: Jiexi County, Jieyang, Guangdong, China
- Coordinates: 25°25′43″N 115°50′34″E
- Number of drops: 5

The Huangmanzhai waterfalls are five waterfalls in Jiexi County, Jieyang, Guangdong, China. The main waterfall (Feihong waterfall) is 56 meters high and 82 meters wide.

== See also ==
- List of waterfalls
