= Transport in Guangdong =

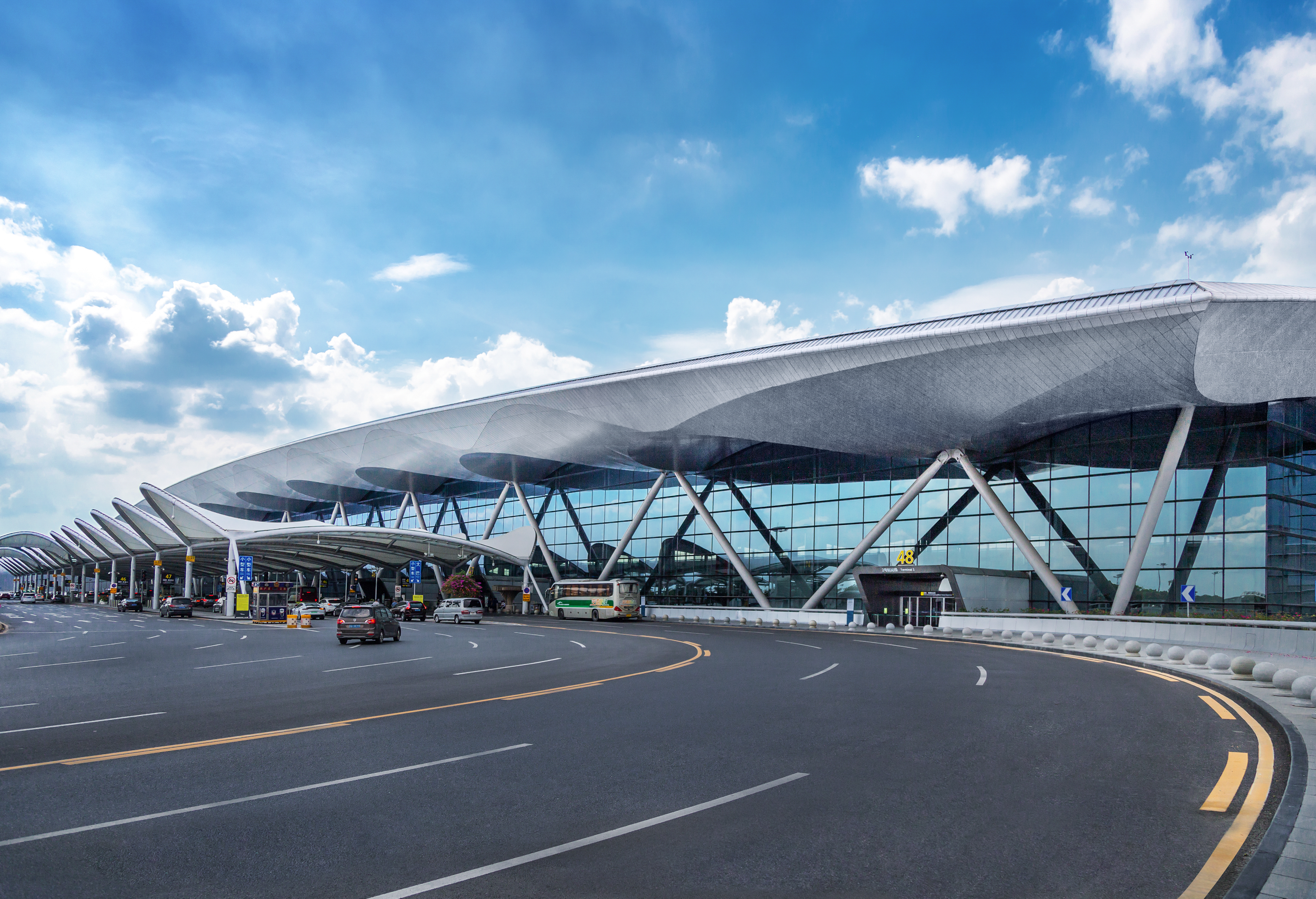
Guangzhou Baiyun International Airport, a major transport hub in Guangdong

Guangdong has well-developed road, rail, air and water transport networks. Different areas of Guangdong are connected both economically and culturally by the waterways of the Pearl River. Water transport is responsible for more than two-fifths of Guangdong's total traffic tonnage. Connection with other provinces rely on Guangdong's extensive road and rail networks, one of the best networks in China.

Guangzhou Baiyun International Airport is one of the busiest airports in China and in the world.

== Air transport ==
Two international airports, Guangzhou Baiyun International Airport and Shenzhen Bao'an International Airport, connect the province with major cities in China and in other countries.

== Rail transport ==
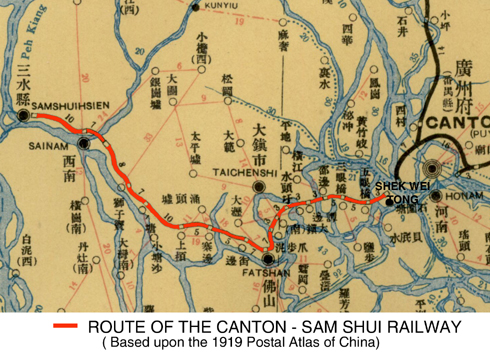
Map of Canton–Sam Shui Railway

Canton–Sam Shui Railway, built from 1902 to 1904, was the first railway line in Guangdong.

As of 2018 in Guangdong, China Railway Guangzhou Group manages 4,523.2 km (2,810.6 mi) of railway and regional enterprises manage 283.3 km (176.0 mi). Operating high-speed rail networks span 1,904.9 km (1,183.6 mi).

Inter-city train services crossing the Hong Kong-Guangdong border connect major cities in Guangdong with Hong Kong. Guangzhou–Kowloon through train and Guangzhou–Shenzhen–Hong Kong Express Rail Link (XRL) serve cities between Guangzhou and Hong Kong.

== Road transport ==
The Guangzhou Provincial Passenger Bus Station is the largest bus station in Guangdong.

In 2020, Guangdong became the first province in China to have over 10,000 km of Expressways.

== Water transport ==
Ferries connect Guangdong cities within the Pearl River Delta and Hong Kong and Macau.

== See also ==
- Transport in Hong Kong
- Transport in Macau
