= Shikengkong =

Highest mountain in Guangdong, China

- Location within China

Highest point
- Elevation: 1,902 m (6,240 ft)
- Prominence: 1,622 m (5,322 ft)
- Listing: Ultra, Ribu
- Coordinates: 24°55′40″N 112°59′27″E

Geography
- Location: Yangshan County and Ruyuan Yao Autonomous County, Guangdong, China
- Parent range: Dongnan Qiuling

Shikengkong (Chinese: 石坑崆; pinyin: Shíkēngkōng) is a mountain located between Yangshan County and Ruyuan Yao Autonomous County in northern Guangdong, China. With an altitude of 1,902 m (6,240 ft), it is the highest mountain in the province.

== See also ==
- List of ultras of Tibet, East Asia and neighbouring areas
