= Weizhou =

Weizhou or Wei Zhou may refer to:

- Weizhou Island (涠洲岛), Haicheng District, Beihai, Guangxi
- Weizhou, Guangxi (涠洲镇), town in Haicheng District that includes the island
- Weizhou, Hebei (威州镇), town in Jingxing County, Hebei
- Weizhou, Wenchuan County (威州镇), town and the county seat of Wenchuan County, Sichuan
- Xu Weizhou (born 1994), Chinese actor

== Historical prefectures ==
- Wei Prefecture (Shandong) (濰州), a prefecture between the 6th and 14th centuries in modern Shandong
- Wei Prefecture (Hebei) (魏州)
- Wei Prefecture (Henan) (衛州), a prefecture between the 6th and 13th centuries in modern Henan
- Wei Prefecture (Gansu) (渭州), a prefecture between the 9th and 12th centuries in modern Gansu and Ningxia

== See also ==
- Yu Prefecture (Hebei) (蔚州), a historical prefecture also translated as Wei Prefecture
- Zhou Wei (disambiguation)
- Wei (disambiguation)
