= Beihai Fucheng Airport =

Beihai Fucheng Airport 北海福成机场
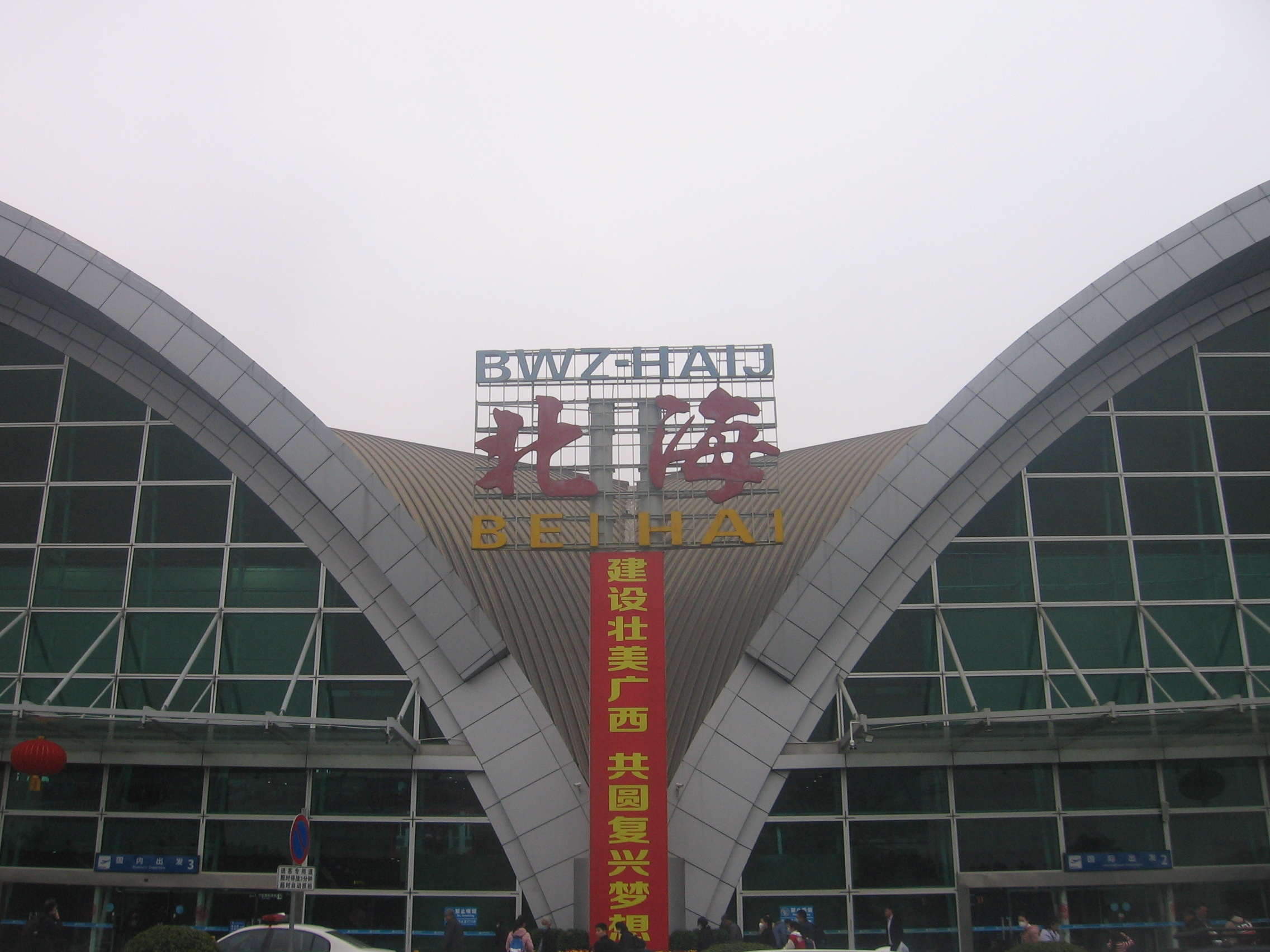
- IATA: BHY; ICAO: ZGBH

Summary
- Airport type: Public
- Serves: Beihai, Guangxi
- Location: Fucheng, Yinhai District, Beihai
- Coordinates: 21°32′22″N 109°17′38″E

Map
- Location in Guangxi BHY/ZGBH (China)

Runways
Direction	Length		Surface
Direction	m	ft	Surface
01/19	3,200	10,499	Concrete

Statistics (2025)
- Passengers: 2,955,931
- Aircraft movements: 20,536
- Cargo (metric tons): 5,038.3
- Source: CAAC

Beihai Fucheng Airport
- Simplified Chinese: 北海福成机场
- Traditional Chinese: 北海福成機場
Transcriptions
Standard Mandarin
- Hanyu Pinyin: Běihǎi Fúchéng Jīchǎng

Beihai Fucheng Airport (IATA: BHY, ICAO: ZGBH) is an airport serving the city of Beihai in Guangxi Zhuang Autonomous Region, China. It serves primarily domestic destinations within China, with limited international service. In 2011 it ranked as the 63rd busiest airport in China, in terms of passengers.

== History ==
In 1984, the site selection for Beihai Airport began, and it was determined to be the southern site of Sanhekou Farm in Fucheng Township, Hepu County. In December, the State Council and the Central Military Commission approved the construction project of Beihai Fucheng Airport. In April 1985, the airport project broke ground, was completed in October 1986 and opened to traffic on March 15, 1987. In its early years, the airport operated with a modest 1,800‑meter runway and a small terminal, serving only a handful of aircraft stands. It was approved for international openness in 1993, launching its first charter service to Hong Kong that same year. At that time, the runway was 1,800 meters long and 45 meters wide, the airport apron area was 24,000 square meters, the domestic waiting room area was 5,207 square meters, and the international waiting room area was 1,130 square meters.

Due to the rapid economic development in the Beihai region, the original airport size no longer meets the requirements of Beihai development. Under this situation, the Beihai prefectural government made the decision to expand Beihai Airport. The airport expansion project officially started on May 18, 1994. Four years later, the construction of the flight area and the corresponding communication and navigation, meteorological and navigation lighting projects were basically completed in December 1998. The airport passed the preliminary acceptance of the Civil Aviation Administration of Central and South China in early February 1999. The upgraded airfield, featuring a 3,200‑meter long, 60-meter wide runway and 4D‑class advanced equipment and facilities.

The new terminal building at Beihai Airport was approved on May 18, 2001, as part of the third batch of national key construction projects launched that year. It passed completion inspection on October 28, 2006, followed by industry acceptance organized by the Civil Aviation Administration of China's Central and Southern Regional Administration on December 7 of the same year. A subsequent review was completed on May 15 this year, and on July 6 the Civil Aviation Administration issued the official aeronautical notice placing the new terminal into operation. Built with a total investment of 308 million yuan, the new terminal covers 27,800 square meters and is equipped with five boarding bridges (expandable to eight), along with two exits for remote stands. It is designed to handle 2.7 million passengers annually, with a peak‑hour capacity of 1,350 passengers. The terminal hall features a large‑span triangular steel column grid, an elliptical curved steel roof structure, and a five‑layer aluminum alloy roofing system manufactured by Germany's Kalzip. The exterior walls are constructed with glass curtain wall panels. The main structure of the new terminal consists of four levels.

The apron expansion project at Beihai Airport was approved in August 2018. After expansion, the new apron covers a total area of 220,000 square meters and provides 22 aircraft stands and seven boarding bridges. It can accommodate the simultaneous parking of twenty Class‑C aircraft and two Class‑B aircraft, with the largest compatible aircraft type being the Airbus A330. Major works included the construction of a 220‑meter bypass taxiway at the southern end of the runway, adding approximately 120,000 square meters of new pavement; the addition of one new boarding bridge to the terminal; and supporting facilities such as upgraded airfield lighting and firefighting and rescue systems. The apron expansion officially commenced on March 18, 2020, reached completion on September 8 of the same year, and passed industry acceptance on September 28. On December 31, the new apron at Beihai Airport was formally placed into operation.

Starting December 17, 2024, the National Immigration Administration of China optimized its transit visa-free policy, adding Beihai Fucheng International Airport and other ports of entry as 240-hour (10-day) visa-free transit ports. Citizens of 54 countries holding valid travel documents and connecting tickets to a third country can enter through these ports and stay visa-free for 10 days in applicable areas such as Guangxi.

== Airlines and destinations ==
Airlines	Destinations
Air Chang'an	Xi'an
Air China	Beijing–Capital, Beijing–Daxing, Chengdu–Shuangliu, Chengdu–Tianfu
Air Travel	Changsha
Chengdu Airlines	Chengdu–Shuangliu, Chengdu–Tianfu, Shenyang, Wuhan
China Eastern Airlines	Beijing–Daxing, Nanjing, Shanghai–Pudong, Taiyuan, Wuhan, Yichang
China Express Airlines	Chongqing, Xingyi
China Southern Airlines	Guangzhou
China United Airlines	Beijing–Daxing
Hainan Airlines	Lanzhou, Nanchong
Jiangxi Air	Chengdu–Tianfu
Sichuan Airlines	Chengdu–Tianfu, Chongqing, Harbin, Tianjin, Urumqi, Xi'an, Yibin
Spring Airlines	Dalian, Shijiazhuang
Tianjin Airlines	Wuhan, Yulin (Shaanxi)
West Air	Chongqing, Zhengzhou
XiamenAir	Fuzhou, Hangzhou
Xizang Airlines	Chengdu–Shuangliu

== See also ==
- List of airports in China
- List of the busiest airports in China
