= Yinhai =

Yinhai may refer to:

- Yinhai District, in Beihai, Guangxi, China
- 3340 Yinhai, main-belt asteroid
