= Jinhai Power Station =

Jinhai Power Station 金海发电厂
- Location: Beihai, Guangxi
- Purpose: Power
- Construction began: August 1989
- Opening date: 1990
- Construction cost: $28.5 million

Jinhai Power Station (Chinese: 金海发电厂), also known as Jinhai Power Plant or Jinhai Generating Plant, is a Chinese generating plant located at Beihai, Guangxi, with a total installed capacity of 42,000 kilowatts. The total investment of the project is 28.5 million US dollars.

== History ==
On August 30, 1989, groundbreaking for the Jinhai Power Station took place. The generating plant covers an area of 31,500 square meters, with a construction area of 6,000 square meters, and a total investment of $12.5 million for the first phase of the plant.

On August 28, 1990, Jinhai Power Station was put into operation.
