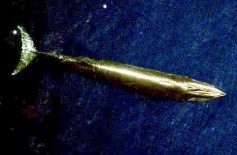
- Balaenoptera brydei
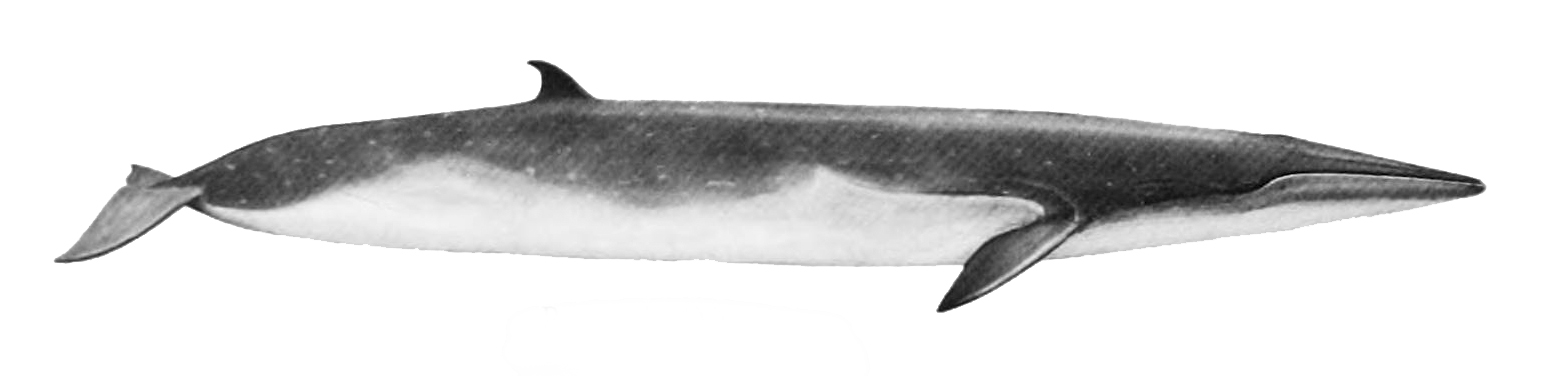
- Balaenoptera edeni

Conservation status
- Least Concern (IUCN 3.1)
- CITES Appendix I

Scientific classification
- Kingdom: Animalia
- Phylum: Chordata
- Class: Mammalia
- Order: Artiodactyla
- Infraorder: Cetacea
- Family: Balaenopteridae
- Genus: Balaenoptera
- Species complex: Bryde's whale complex

Species
- Balaenoptera brydei Olsen, 1913; Balaenoptera edeni Anderson, 1879
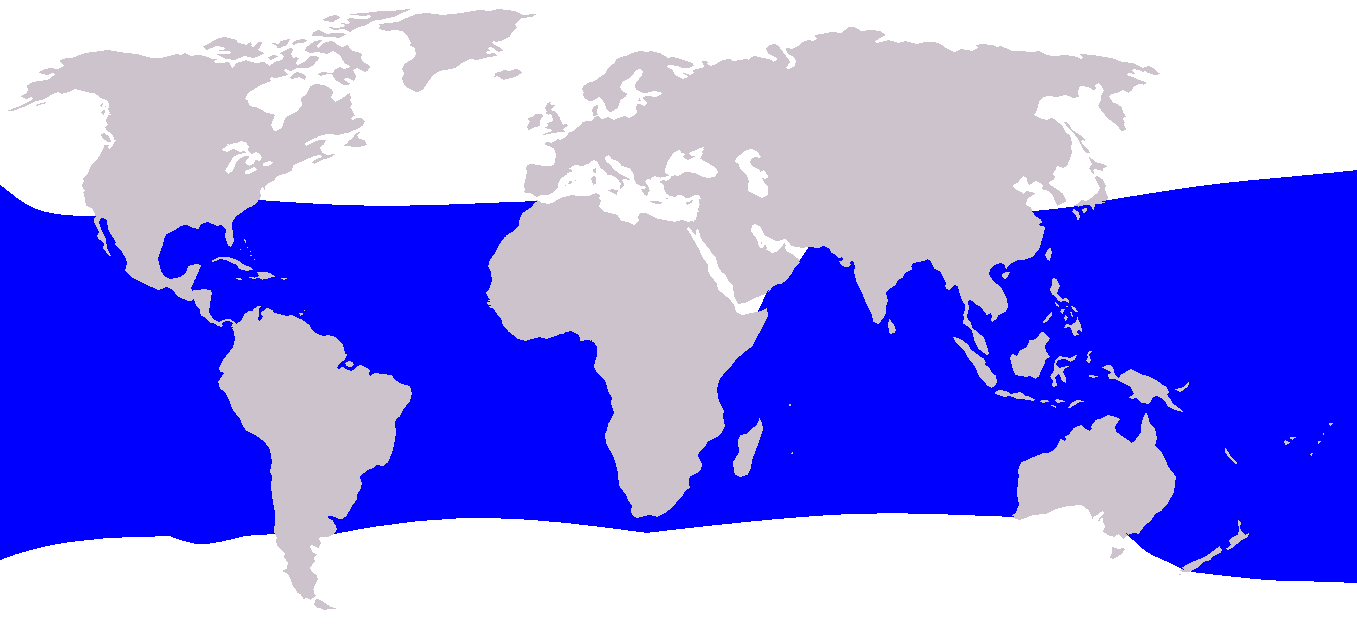
- Bryde's whale range

= Bryde's whale =

Bryde's whales

Species of mammal

Bryde's whale (/ˈbrʊdəz/ BRUU-dəz), or the Bryde's whale complex, putatively comprises three species of rorqual and possibly four. The "complex" means the number and classification remain unclear because of a lack of definitive information and research. The common Bryde's whale (Balaenoptera brydei, Olsen, 1913) is a larger form that occurs worldwide in warm temperate and tropical waters, and the Sittang or Eden's whale (Balaenoptera edeni, Anderson, 1879) is a smaller form that may be restricted to the Indo-Pacific. Also, a smaller, coastal form of B. brydei is found off southern Africa, and perhaps another form in the Indo-Pacific differs in skull morphology, tentatively referred to as the Indo-Pacific Bryde's whale. The recently described Omura's whale (B. omurai, Wada et al. 2003), was formerly thought to be a pygmy form of Bryde's, but is now recognized as a distinct species. Rice's whale (B. ricei), which makes its home solely in the Gulf of Mexico, was once considered a distinct population of Bryde's whale, but in 2021 it was described as a separate species.

B. brydei gets its specific and common name from Johan Bryde, Norwegian consul to South Africa, who helped establish the first modern whaling station in the country, while B. edeni gets its specific and common names from Sir Ashley Eden, former High Commissioner of Burma (Myanmar). Sittang whale refers to the type locality of the species.

== Etymology ==
In Japan, early whalers called it "anchovy" (鰯, iwashi) or "skipjack whale" (鰹鯨, katsuo-kujira; カツオクジラ). It preys on the anchovy and it was commonly associated with the skipjack. As modern whaling shifted to the Sanriku area, whalemen confused the sei whale with it; now iwashi-kujira (鰯鯨; "anchovy whale" イワシクジラ) only applies to the latter. Incidentally, anchovies are dominant prey for both species off Japan. They are now called nitari-kujira (似鯨; "look-alike whale"), for their resemblance to the sei whale.

== Taxonomy ==
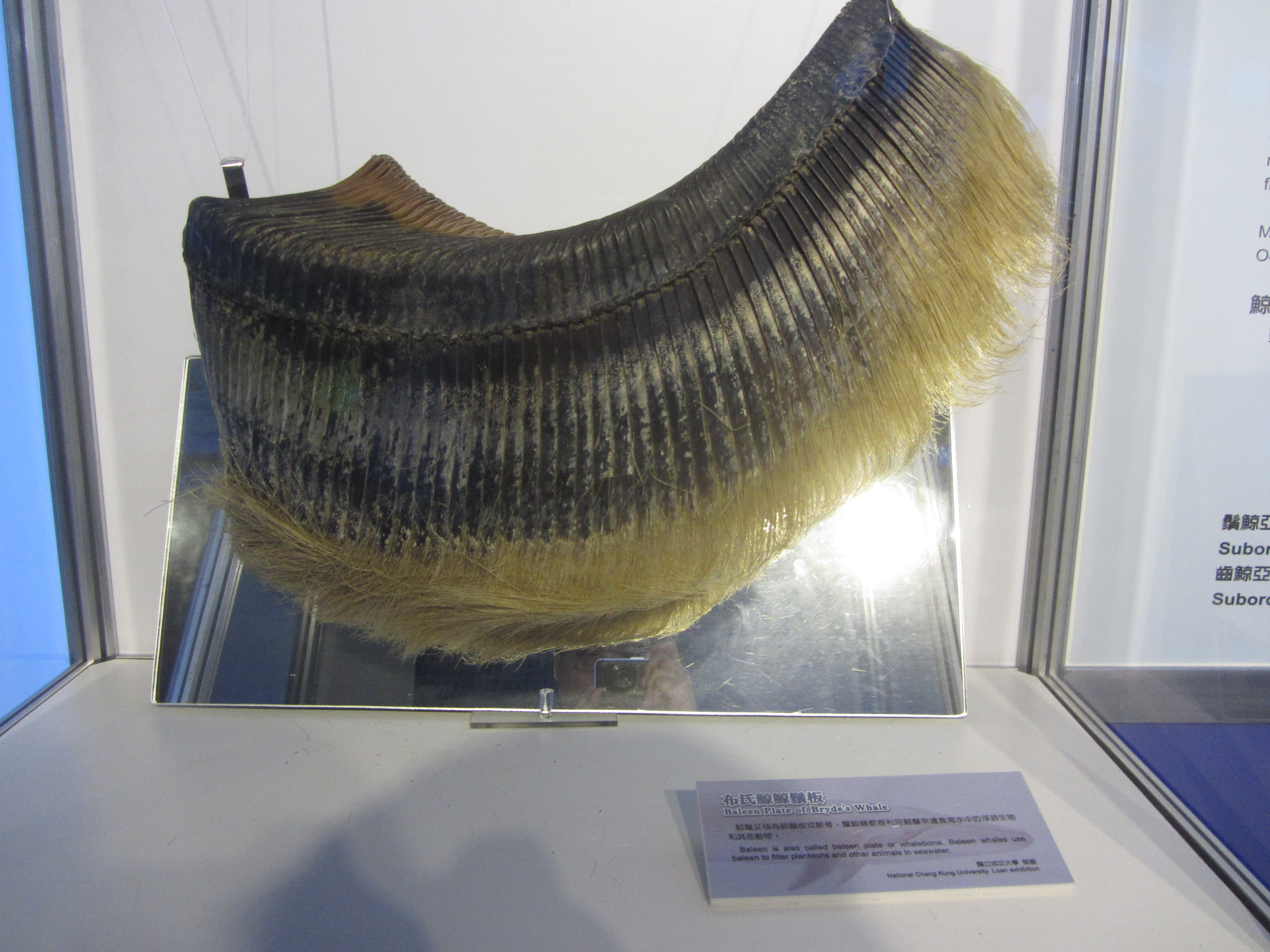
Baleen plate of Bryde's whale

The taxonomy is poorly characterised. The two genetically distinct, candidate species/subspecies/morphologies are Bryde's whale B. brydei and the Sittang or Eden's whale B. edeni, that differentiate by geographic distribution, inshore/offshore preferences, and size. For both putative species, the scientific name B. deni is commonly used or they are simply referred to B. cf brydei/edeni.

In 1878, the Scottish zoologist John Anderson, first curator of the Indian Museum in Calcutta, described Balaenoptera edeni, naming it after the former British High Commissioner in Burma, Sir Ashley Eden, who helped obtain the type specimen. Eden's Deputy Commissioner, Major A.G. Duff, sent a Mr Duke, one of his assistants, to Thaybyoo Creek, between the Sittang and Beeling Rivers, on the Gulf of Martaban, where he found a 11-metre (37 ft) whale, which had stranded there in June 1871 after swimming more than 32 kilometres (20 mi) up the creek—it was said to have "exhausted itself by its furious struggles" to get free and "roared like an elephant" before finally expiring. Despite terrible weather, he was able to secure almost the entire skull and nearly all its vertebrae, along with other bones. These were sent to Anderson, who described the specimen, which was physically mature, as a new species. In 1913, the Norwegian scientist Ørjan Olsen, based on the examination of a dozen "sei whales" brought to the whaling stations at Durban and Saldanha, in South Africa, described Balaenoptera brydei, naming it after the Norwegian consul to South Africa Johan Bryde. In 1950, the Dutch scientist G.C.A. Junge, after comparing specimens of B. edeni and B. brydei with a 12-metre (39 ft), physically mature specimen that had stranded on Pulau Sugi, an island between Singapore and Sumatra, in July 1936, synonymized the two species into B. edeni.

In the 1950s it was discovered that there were two types of "sei whale" off Japan, a northern form with longer, finer baleen and shorter ventral grooves and a southern form with shorter, coarser baleen and longer ventral grooves. They also differed in the shape of the palate. The former was caught off northeastern Honshu and eastern Hokkaido, while the latter was taken off western Kyushu and southern Honshu. Both were caught off the Bonin Islands, but at different seasons. It was realized that the northern form were indeed sei whales (B. borealis), but the southern form were Bryde's whale (B. brydei/edeni). A later study revealed that Bryde's caught off Japan exhibited lateral ridges on their rostrum, whereas sei whales lacked this feature.

In the 1960s it was discovered that some of the "sei whales" being caught off Brazil were also Bryde's whales based on the same characters that distinguished the two species off Japan (i.e. three ridges on the rostrum versus one, shape of the palate, texture of the baleen, length of the ventral grooves).

== Description ==
Several differences in anatomy are found between Bryde's and Eden's whales; morphological similarities have caused confusions regarding species identification.

=== Size ===
Size compared to an average human

Members of the Bryde's whale complex are moderately-sized rorquals, falling behind sei whales, but being larger than Omura's whale and the relatively small minke whales. The largest measured by Olsen (1913) was a 14.95 m (49.0 ft) female caught off Durban in November 1912, while the longest of each sex measured by Best (1977) at the Donkergat whaling station in Saldanha Bay, South Africa, were a 15.51 m (50.9 ft) female caught in October 1962 and a 14.56 m (47.8 ft) male caught in April 1963; both were the offshore form. At physical maturity, the coastal form off South Africa averages 13.1 m (43 ft) for males and 13.7 m (45 ft) for females, while the South Africa offshore form averages 13.7 and 14.4 m (45 and 47 ft). The coastal form near Japan is slightly smaller, with adult males averaging 12.9 m (42 ft) and adult females 13.3 m (44 ft). At sexual maturity, males average 11.9 m (39 ft) and females 12 m (39 ft) near Japan. Sexual maturity is reached at 8–11 years for both sexes in the offshore form off South Africa. At birth, they are 3.95–4.15 m (13.0–13.6 ft). The body mass of Bryde's whales can range 12–25 metric tons (13–28 short tons). The bryde's whale is estimated to have weighed up to 40 tonnes (44 short tons). The oldest living bryde's whale was 72 years old.

=== External appearance ===
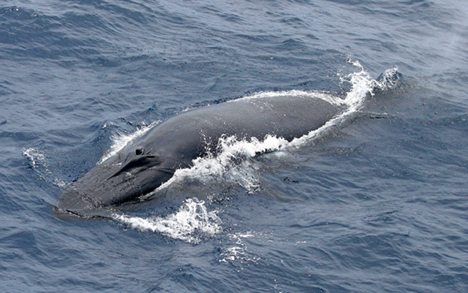
B. cf. brydei, showing faint lateral ridges

The Bryde's whale is a baleen whale, more specifically a rorqual belonging to the same group as blue whales and humpback whales. It has twin blowholes with a low splashguard to the front. Like other rorquals, it has no teeth, but has two rows of baleen plates.

Bryde's whales closely resemble their close relative the sei whale. They are remarkably elongated (even more so than fin whales), with the greatest height of the body being one seventh their total length—compared to 1/6.5 to 1/6.75 in fin whales and only 1/5.5 in sei whales. Bryde's are dark smoky grey dorsally and usually white ventrally, whereas sei whales are often a galvanized blue-grey dorsally and have a variably sized white patch on the throat, a posteriorly oriented white anchor-shaped marking between the pectoral fins, and are blue-grey beyond the anus—although Bryde's off South Africa can have a similar irregular white patch on the throat. Bryde's have a straight rostrum with three longitudinal ridges that extend from the blowholes, where the auxiliary ridges begin as depressions, to the tip of the rostrum. The sei whale, like other rorquals, has a single median ridge, as well as a slightly arched rostrum, which is accentuated at the tip. Bryde's usually have dark grey lower jaws, whereas sei whales are lighter grey. Bryde's have 250–370 pairs of short, slate grey baleen plates with long, coarse, lighter grey or white bristles that are 40 cm (16 in) long by 20 cm (7.9 in) wide, while sei whales have longer, black or dark grey baleen plates with short, curling, wool-like bristles.

The 40 to 70 ventral pleats extend to or past the umbilicus, occupying about 58% and 57% of the total length, respectively; sei whales, though, have ventral pleats that extend only halfway between the pectoral fins and umbilicus, occupying only 45–47% of the total body length, whereas their umbilicus is usually 52% of the total body length. Both species are often covered with white or pink oval scars caused by bites from cookie-cutter sharks.

Bryde's whales have an upright, falcate dorsal fin that is up to 46.25 cm (18.21 in) in height, average 34.4 cm (13.5 in), and is usually between 30 and 37.5 cm (11.8 and 14.8 in). It is often frayed or ragged along its rear margin and located about two-thirds of the way along the back. The broad, centrally notched tail flukes rarely break the surface. The flippers are small and slender.

== Behaviour ==
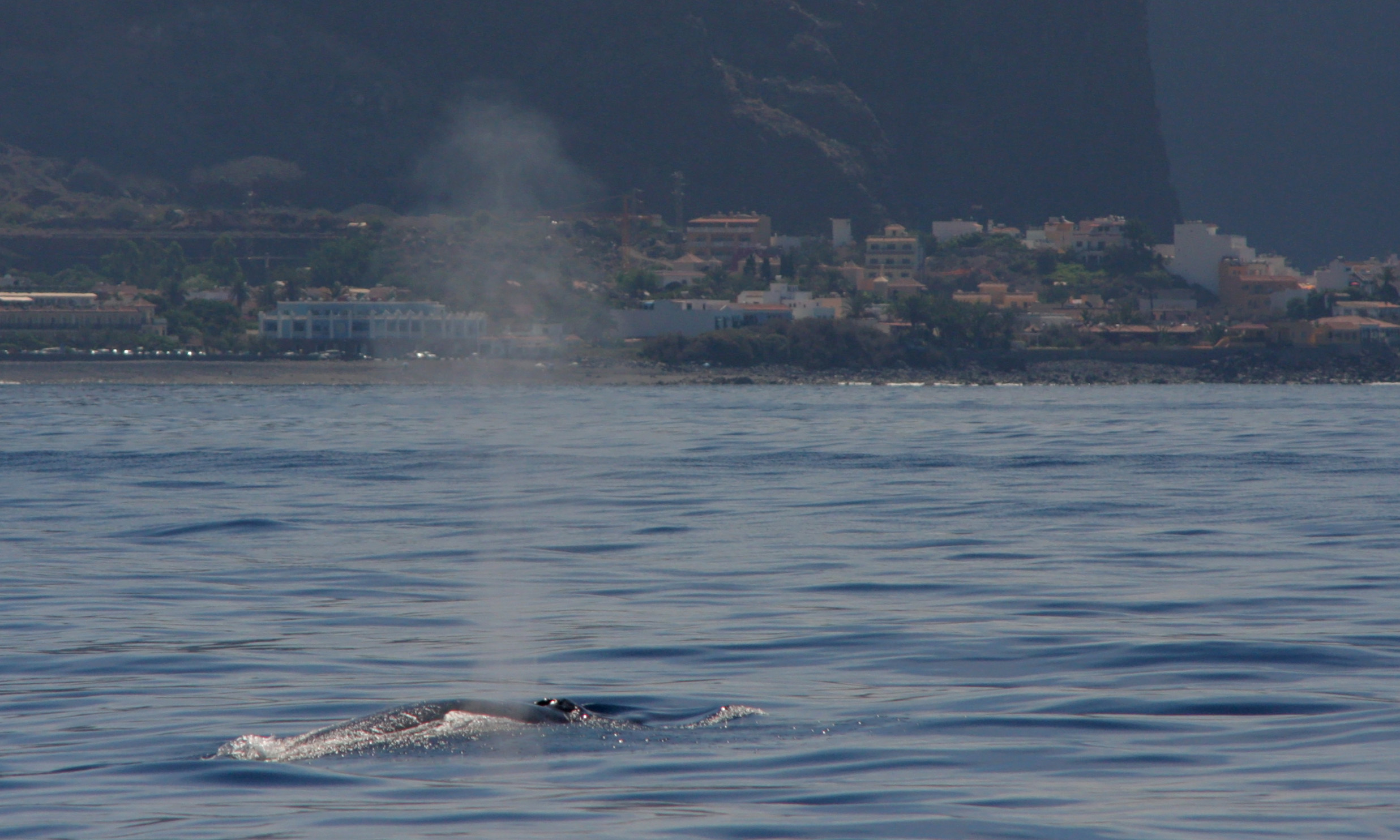
B. cf. brydei off La Gomera, showing its culumnar blow

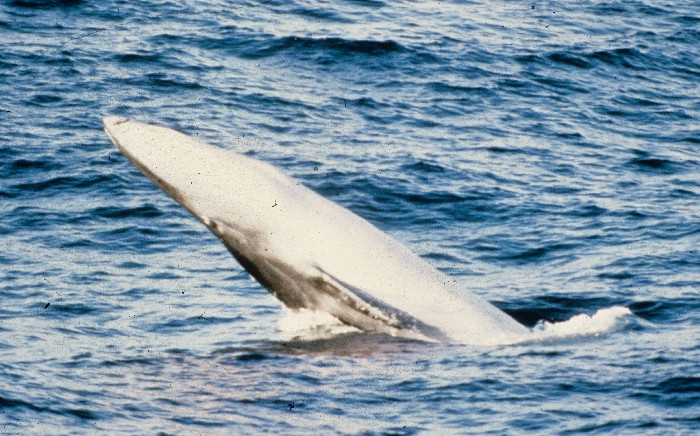
B. cf. brydei breaches, showing gray upper half of lower jaw

Their blow is columnar or bushy, about 3.0–4.0 m (10–13 ft) high. Sometimes, they blow or exhale while under water. Bryde's whales display seemingly erratic behaviour compared to other baleen whales, because they surface at irregular intervals and can change directions for unknown reasons.

They usually appear individually or in pairs, and occasionally in loose aggregations up to 20 animals around feeding areas. They are more active on the water surface than sei whales, especially in coastal waters.

=== Breathing ===
They regularly dive for about 5–15 minutes (maximum of 20 minutes) after four to seven blows. Bryde's whales are capable of reaching depths down to 292 metres (958 ft). When submerging, these whales do not display their flukes. Bryde's whales commonly swim at 1.6–6.4 km/h (1–4 mph), but can reach 19–25 km/h (12–16 mph). They sometimes generate short (0.4 seconds) powerful, low-frequency vocalizations that resemble a human moan.

=== Diet ===
Bryde's whales feed on a wide variety of fish, planktonic crustaceans, and cephalopods. In the western North Pacific, Bryde's whales caught by Japanese scientific whaling vessels (2000–2007) mainly fed on Japanese anchovy (Engraulis japonicus, 52%) and various species of euphausiid (36%, including Euphausia similis, E. gibboides, Thysanoessa gregaria, and Nematoscelis difficilis), as well as oceanic lightfish (Vinciguerria nimbaria, nearly 3%), and mackerels (Scomber spp., less than 2%). The prey differed by location and season. In coastal areas, euphausiids dominated the diet, comprising 89 and 75% of the diet in May and June, respectively. Further offshore, Japanese anchovy was the dominant species, accounting for nearly 100% of the diet in late summer. Based on the stomach contents of Bryde's whales caught by Japanese pelagic whaling expeditions in the North Pacific in the 1970s, the majority were found to feed on euphausiids (nearly 89%), whereas only about 11% fed on fish.

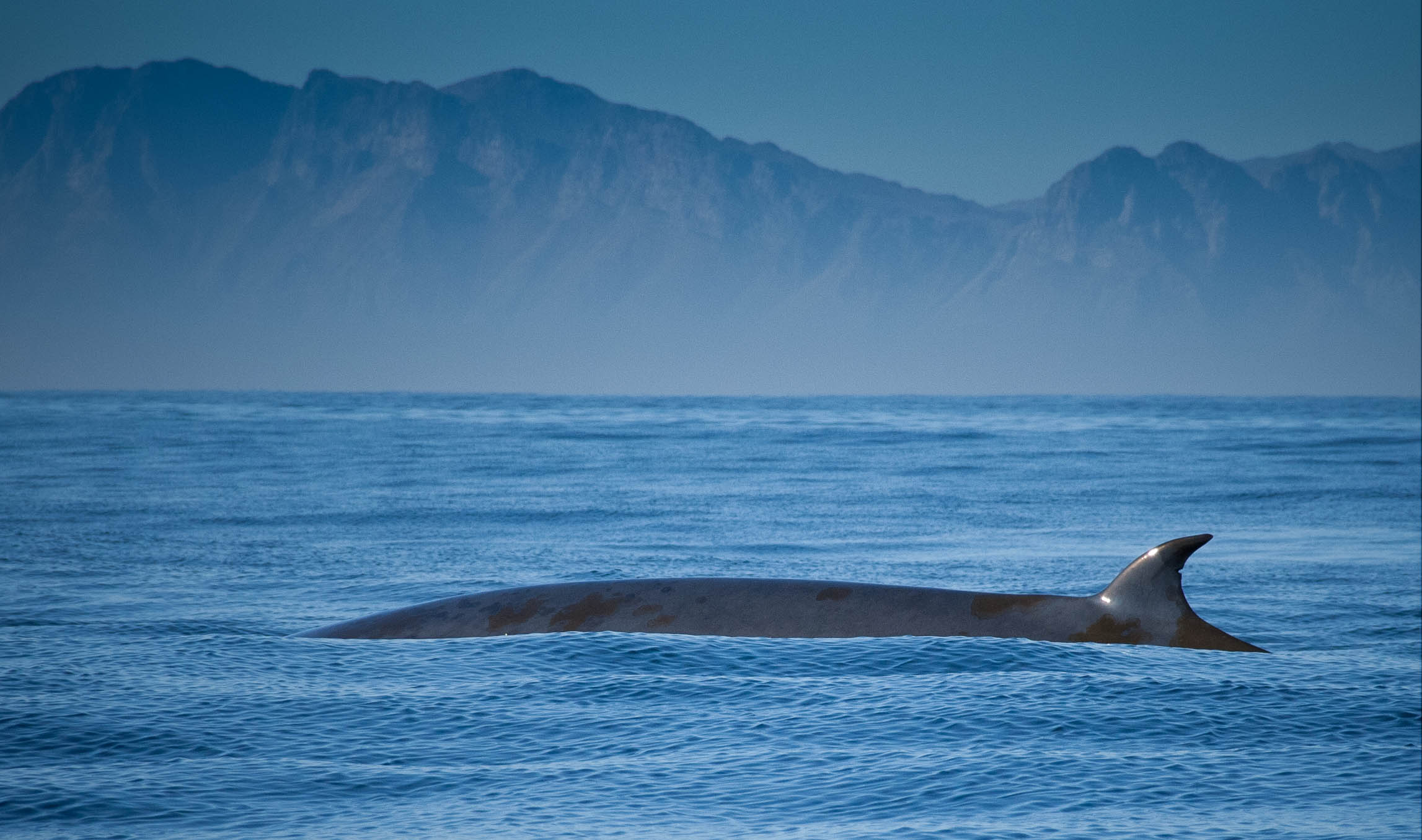
A B. brydei in False Bay, South Africa, showing upright dorsal fin, which is often nicked or frayed on its trailing edge (shown here)

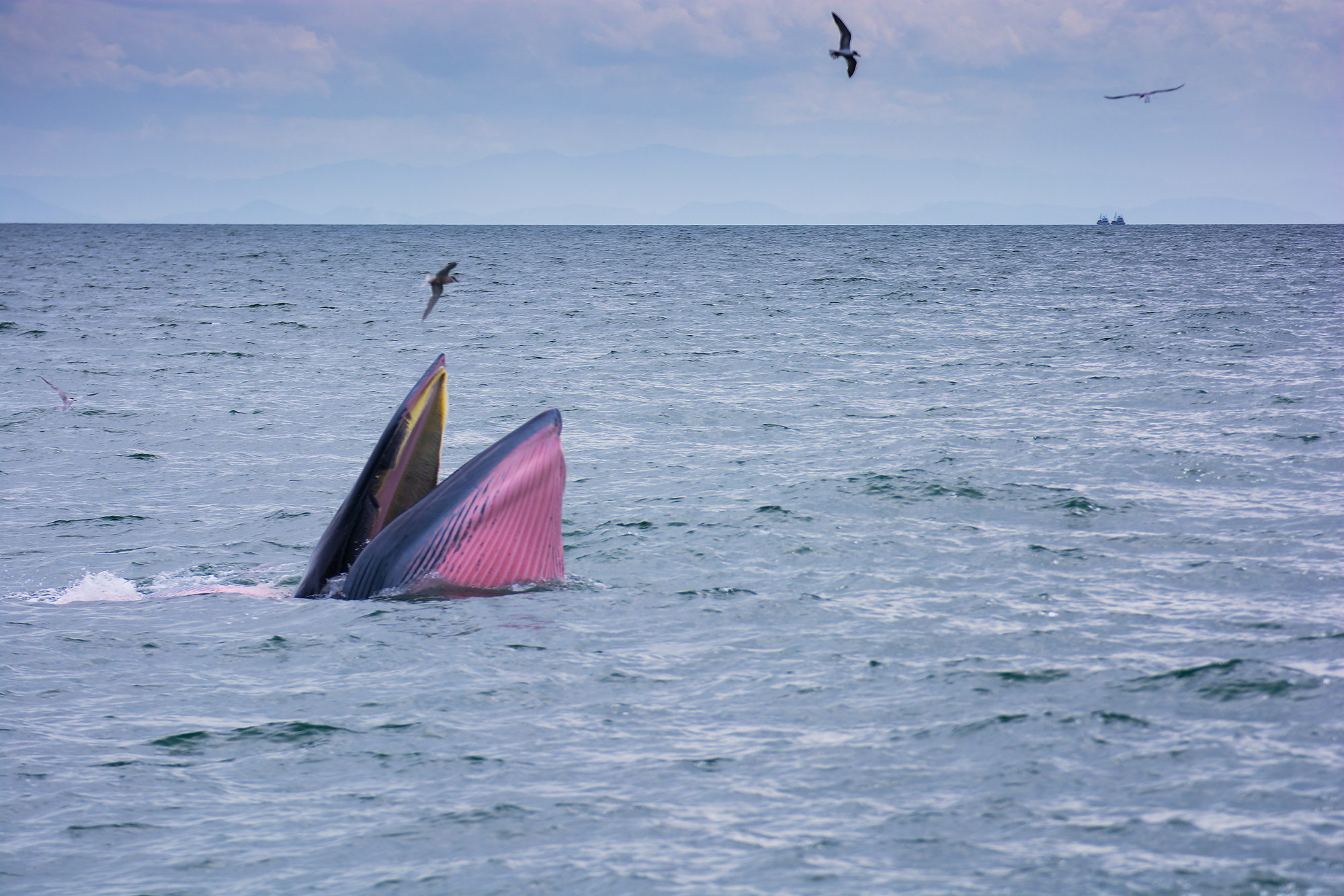
Eden's whale feeding in Gulf of Thailand

Off South Africa, prey preferences differed between the inshore and offshore forms. The former mainly feed on anchovies (Engraulis capensis, 83%), maasbankers (Trachurus trachurus, 36%), and pilchards (Sardinops ocellata, 33%), with only one (or 3%) being found with euphausiids (Nyctiphanes capensis). The latter, however, mainly feed on euphausiids (primarily Euphausia lucens, but also E. recurva, N. capensis, and Thysanoessa gregaria), as well as various deep-sea fish (including Mueller's pearlside, Maurolicus muelleri, and a species of Lestidium). One was even found "full of baby squid" (later identified as Lycoteuthis diadema).

In the Gulf of California, they mainly feed on Pacific sardine (Sardinops sagax) and Pacific thread herring (Opisthonema libertate) (about 88%), but also feed on euphausiids (mostly Nyctiphanes simplex, 11%). They have also been observed feeding on pelagic red crabs (Pleuroncodes planipes) off southern Baja California. In the Coral Sea, the South Pacific, and the Indian Ocean, they appear to mainly feed on euphausiids, while off Brazil, they have been observed feeding on sardines. Individuals caught off Western Australia were found with anchovies (E. australis) in their stomachs (though these individuals may refer to Omura's whale). Bryde's whales use several feeding methods, including skimming the surface, lunging, and bubble nets especially within Gulf of Tosa.

Along southeastern coasts of Brazil, whales add twisting movements to lunge feeding.

In the Pacific and northern Indian Ocean, Bryde's whales have been observed employing "tread-water feeding" or "trap feeding," a behaviour more commonly known from the northern Gulf of Thailand which is also performed by humpback whales in the northeastern Pacific.

=== Reproduction and nurturing ===
Bryde's whales breed in alternate years, apparently in any season, with an autumnal peak. Their gestation period is estimated at 12 months. Calves are about 3.4–4.0 m (11–13 ft) long at birth and weigh 1,000 kg (2,200 lb). They become sexually mature at 8–13 years of age, when females are 12 m (39 ft). The mother nurses for 6–12 months.

=== Vocalizations ===
In 2014, a mysterious sound, dubbed a biotwang, was discovered in underwater recordings from the Mariana Archipelago. It was assumed to be produced by a baleen whale of unknown species. In 2024 that sound was shown to come from Bryde's whales.

== Distribution ==
=== B. brydei ===
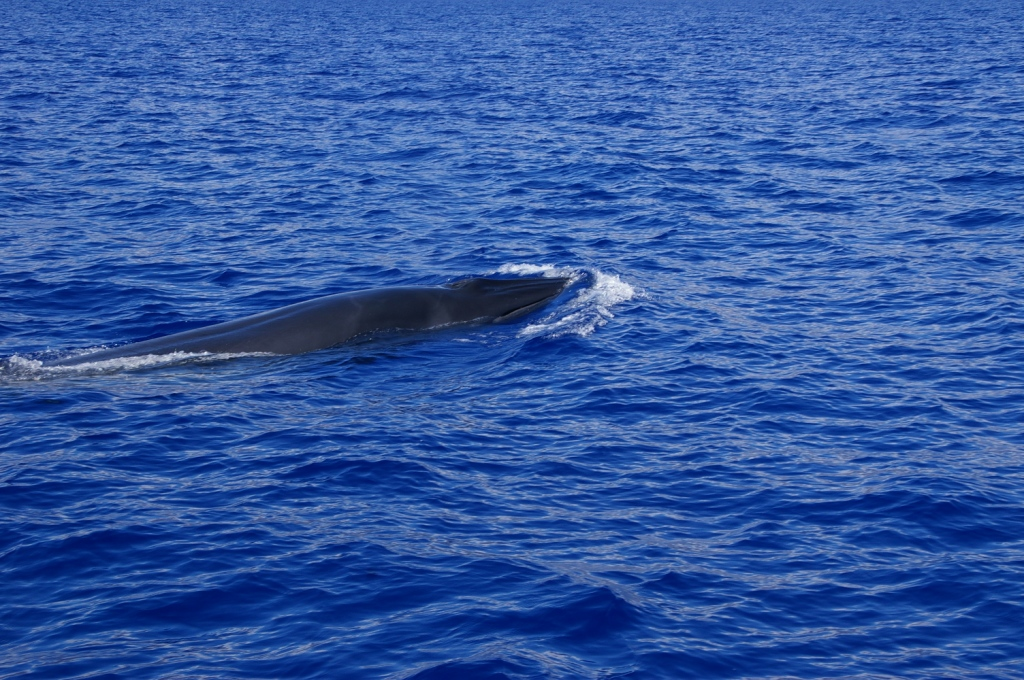
B. cf. brydei whale swimming off Madeira, Portugal

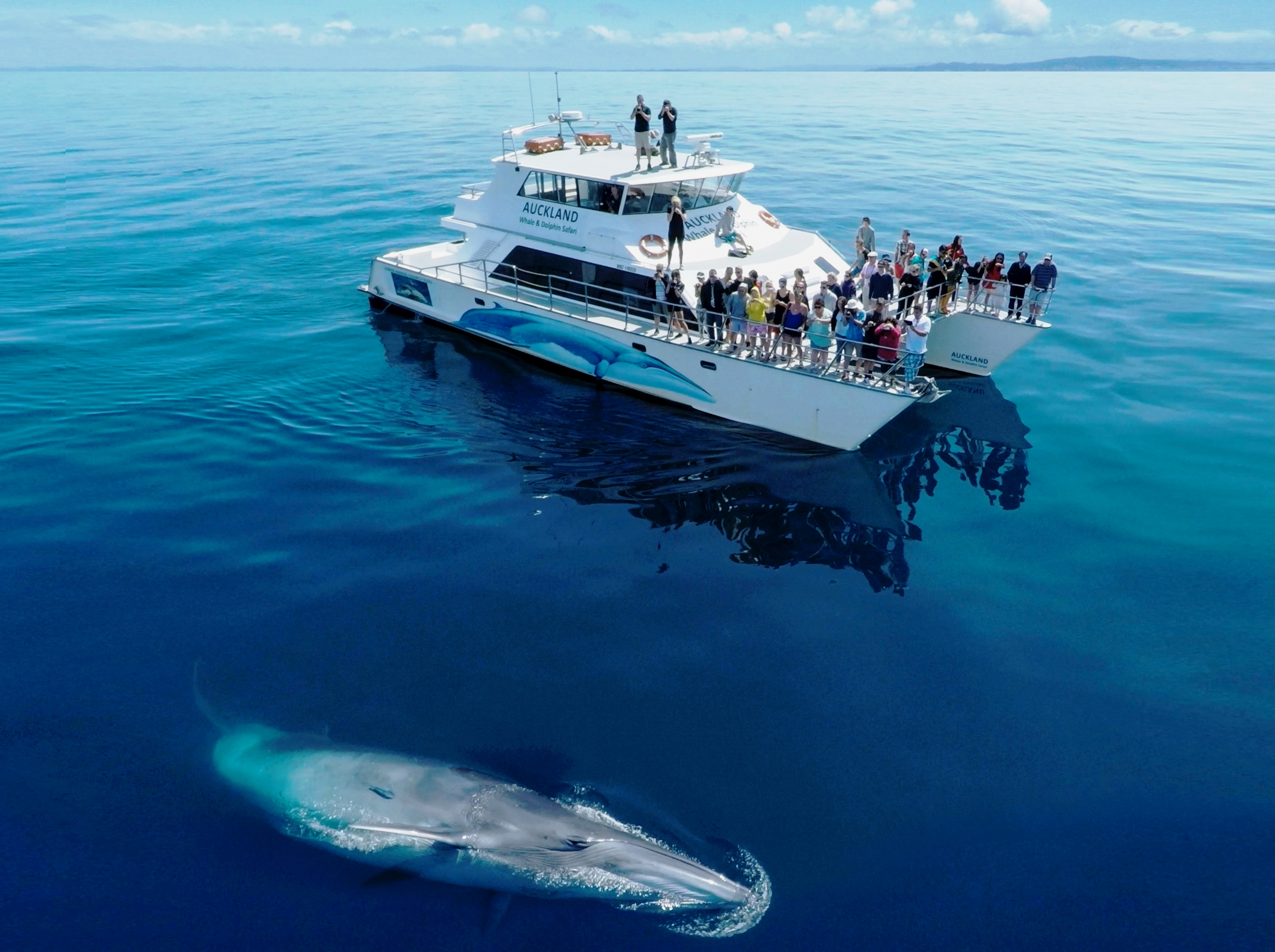
A Bryde's whale in the Hauraki Gulf Marine Park, New Zealand

B. brydei occurs in the Atlantic, Pacific, and Indian Oceans between the 40th parallels of latitude, preferring highly productive, tropical, subtropical, and warm, temperate waters of 16–22 °C (61–72 °F). In the North Pacific, they occur as far north as Honshu to the west and southern California in the east, with vagrants reported as far north as Washington in the United States. They occur throughout the eastern tropical Pacific, including Peru and Ecuador, where they are absent from July to September. They have also been reported in an upwelling area off Chile between 35° and 37°S. In the southwestern Pacific, they occur as far south as the North Island of New Zealand.

Based on osteological features, a specimen from Taiwan was referred to B. brydei, while several specimens from the Philippines and Indonesia differed slightly in skull morphology and were referred to the putative Indo-Pacific Bryde's whale. Mitochondrial DNA analysis showed that Bryde's whales caught in the pelagic western North Pacific and Bonin Islands (resident population), as well as biopsy samples taken from whales off Hawaii, the west coast of Baja California, and the southern Gulf of California, belonged to B. brydei. Resident or semi-resident groups also exist off Hawaiian and Northwestern Hawaiian Islands, and Northern Mariana Islands.

Bryde's whales do not occur within the central to northern Sea of Japan on a regular basis or at least in large numbers. One of the northernmost records in modern times was of a beached, 5-meter-long specimen at Nakhodka in 2011.

B. brydei occurs throughout the Indian Ocean north of about 35°S. Those of the southern Indian Ocean appear to correspond to B. brydei, as do the individuals illegally caught by the Soviets in the 1960s in the northwest Indian Ocean, as well as the Maldives. Individuals sighted in the Red Sea may or may not be B. brydei.

In the North Atlantic, they have been recorded as far north as Cape Hatteras. They occur throughout the wider Caribbean—two specimens from Aruba were found through mtDNA analysis to be firmly placed within B. brydei and to form a clade with a specimen from Madeira and individuals of the offshore form of South Africa. They were first recorded in the Azores in 2004 and showing mixed traits of offshore and inshore forms, but do not occur in the Mediterranean Sea (regarding the bones of a baleen whale found, Bryde's whale was listed as one of suggested species). They appear to occur off Brazil year-round, such as around Rio de Janeiro—Cape Frio, Armação dos Búzios, entrance to Guanabara Bay, Ilha Anchieta State Park, Ilha Grande, and so on. Individuals of the inshore form off South Africa are also resident year-round, occurring mainly between Cape Recife and Saldanha Bay, whereas the larger offshore form migrates to West African equatorial waters in the winter. Regular occurrences have been noted around Cape Verde as well.

=== B. edeni ===
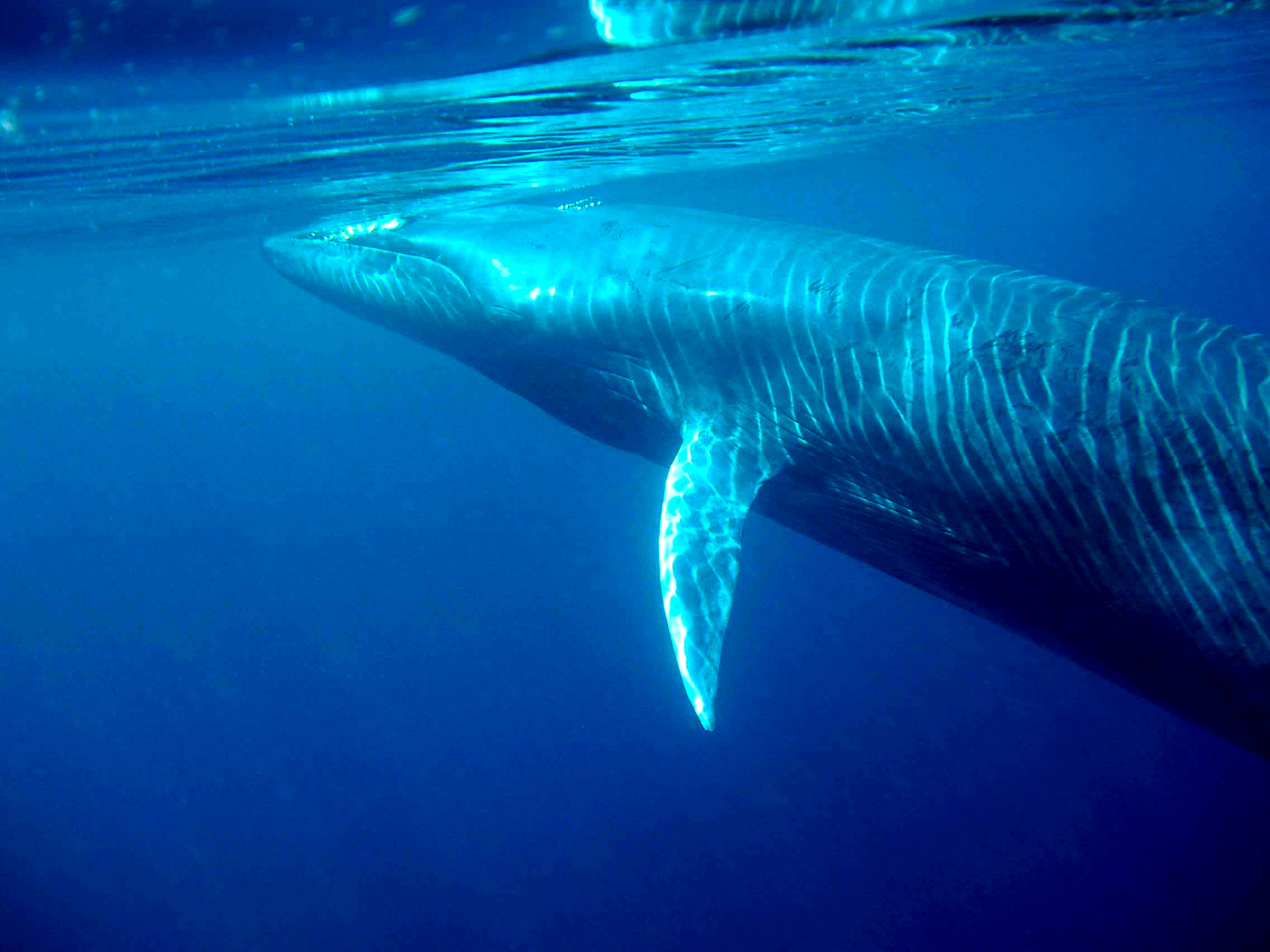
Underwater view of a B. brydei/edeni off Phi Phi Islands, Thailand

The type specimen is from the Gulf of Martaban coast of Myanmar, while other referred specimens were found on the Bay of Bengal coast of Myanmar, Bangladesh, India, Thailand to Vietnam, Taiwan and continental China. A population found off southern and southwestern Japan in the East China Sea has also been referred to B. edeni. A whale stranded in Hong Kong and another saved from a river in eastern Australia were found to be closely related to the Junge specimen and the East China Sea whales. Bryde's whale (most had auxiliary ridges) of small size—estimated at 10.1 to 11.6 m (33 to 38 ft) in length—sighted off the northeastern side of the Solomon Islands during a survey in late November and early December 1993 may be referable to B. edeni. Four of the whales, estimated at 11.3 to 11.6 m (37 to 38 ft) in length, were accompanied by calves that ranged from 6.0 to 6.7 m (19.7 to 22.0 ft) in length. It is unknown whether eight small individuals—reaching only 11.2 to 11.7 m (37 to 38 ft) at maturity—caught off western and eastern Australia between 1958 and 1963 are specimens of B. edeni or B. omurai. Along Chinese coasts, for example, whales were once thought to be abundant along southern coasts from Fujian and Guangdong Provinces to Hainan Island and the north-eastern tip of the Gulf of Tonkin such as off Tieshangang District and around Weizhou and Xieyang Islands.

== Population ==
The population may include up to 90,000–100,000 animals worldwide, with two-thirds inhabiting the Northern Hemisphere.

For management purposes, the U.S. population is divided into three groups: the Eastern Tropical Pacific stock (11,000–13,000 animals) and the Hawaiian stock (350–500) and an endangered stock of about 100 whales in the Gulf of Mexico. As of 2016, the Bryde's whale is considered to be critically endangered in New Zealand as there are approximately 200 left in the wild.

Prior to 2006, only two confirmed sightings of Bryde's whale had been reported in the eastern North Pacific north of Baja California—one in January 1963, only a kilometer off La Jolla (originally misidentified as a fin whale), and another in October 1991 west of Monterey Bay. Between August 2006 and September 2010, six sightings were made by scientists in the Southern California Bight. Five were west of San Clemente Island, and one between San Clemente Island and Santa Catalina Island. All but one involved single individuals. Another sighting was made off Dana Point, California, on 19 September 2009, which was originally misidentified as a fin whale. On 15 May 2025, a deceased Bryde's whale washed ashore in Port McNeill Bay on northern Vancouver Island, British Columbia, Canada.

In general, data are insufficient to determine population trends.

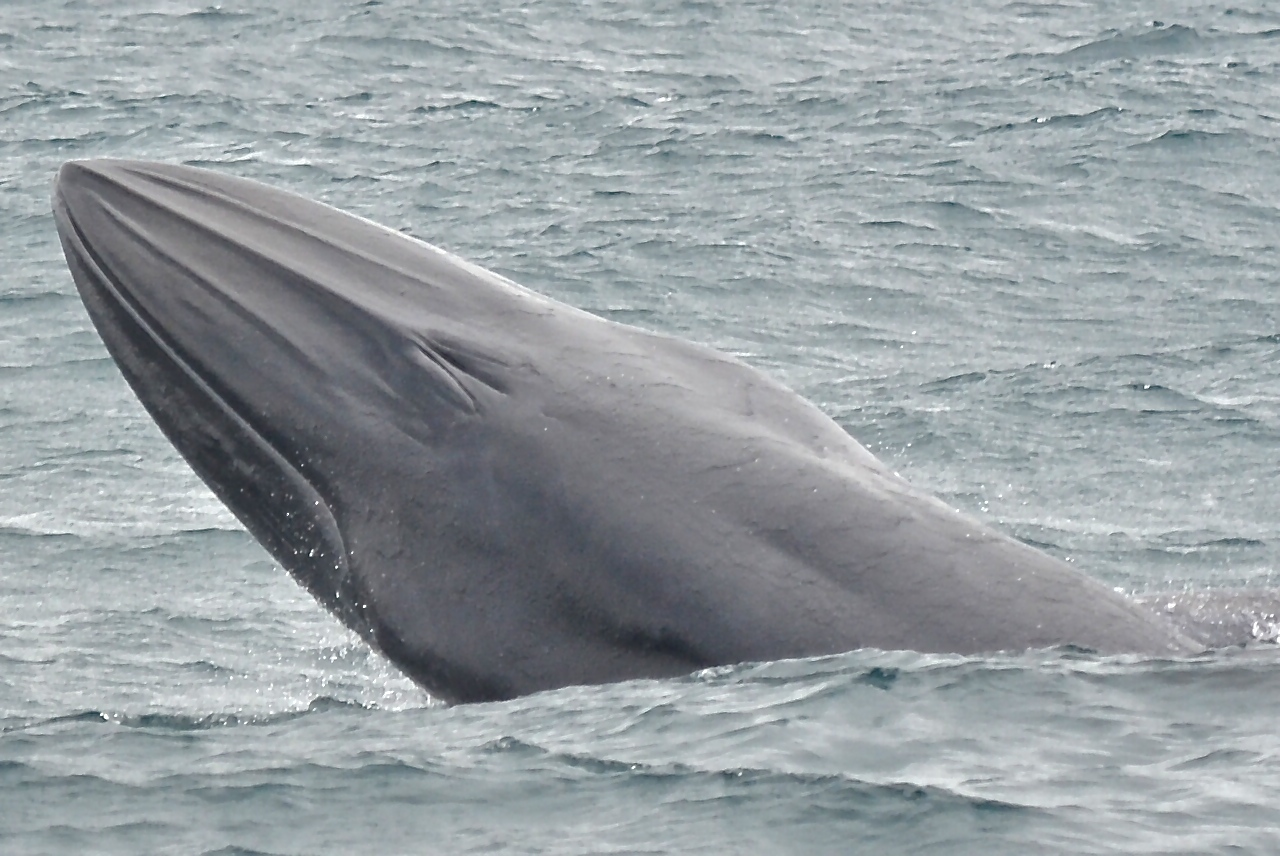
Bryde's whale breaching in Castelhanos Bay, Ilhabela in São Paulo

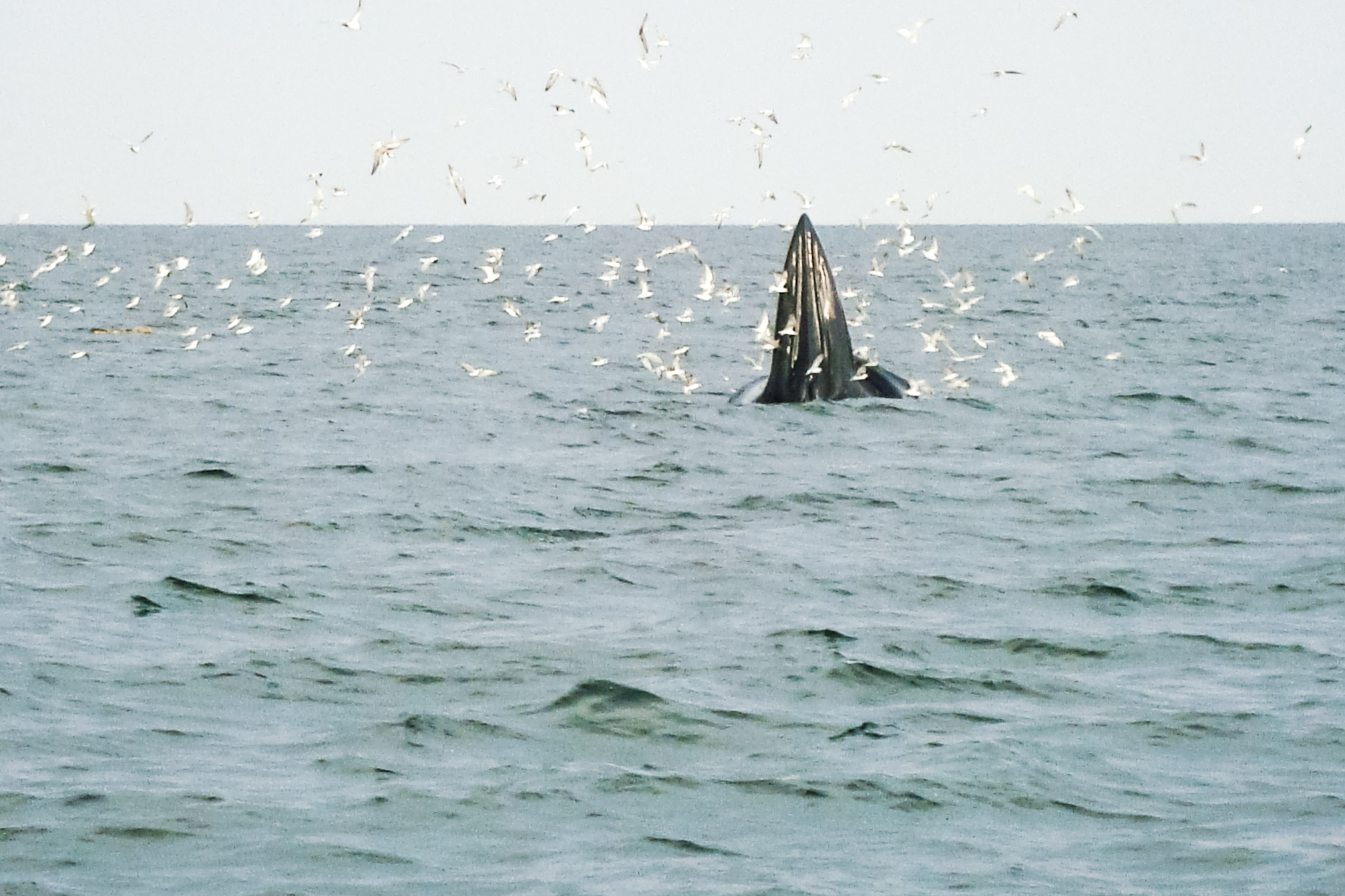
Bryde's whale in the Gulf of Thailand

== Conservation ==
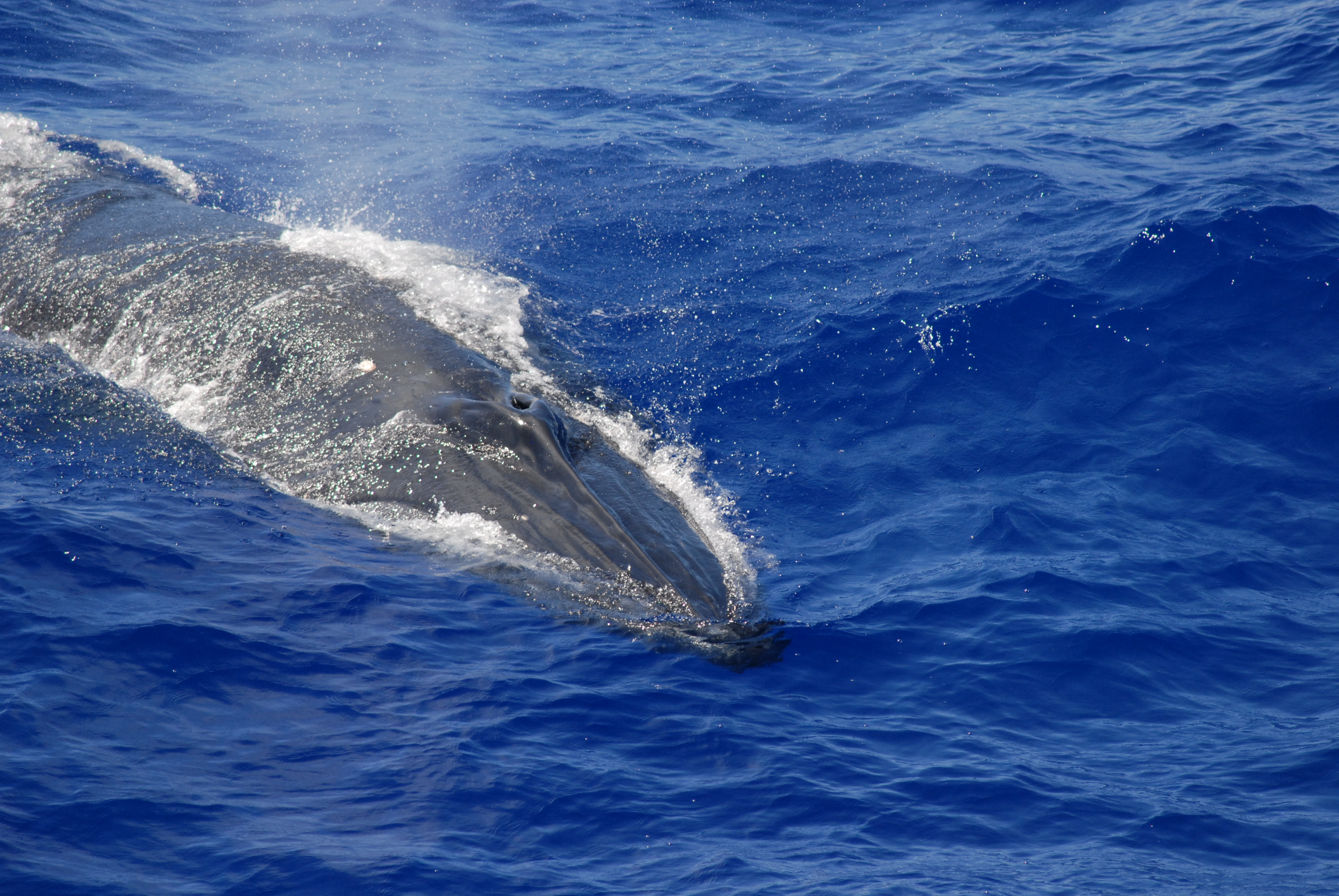
Bryde's whale surfaces off Northwestern Hawaiian Islands

Balaenoptera edeni is listed as least concern by the International Union for the Conservation of Nature and Natural Resources.

It is listed in Convention on International Trade in Endangered Species of Wild Fauna and Flora (CITES) Appendix I, which prohibits commercial international trade.

Balaenoptera brydei has yet to be evaluated.

Bryde's whale is listed on Appendix II of the Convention on the Conservation of Migratory Species of Wild Animals. It is listed on Appendix II as it has an unfavourable conservation status or would benefit significantly from international co-operation organised by tailored agreements.

In addition, Bryde's whale is covered by the Memorandum of Understanding for the Conservation of Cetaceans and Their Habitats in the Pacific Islands Region (Pacific Cetaceans MOU).

=== Whaling ===
Historically, this species was not significantly targeted by commercial whalers, but became more important in the 1970s as the industry depleted other targets. Artisanal whalers have taken them off the coasts of Indonesia and the Philippines.

Modern whaling for Bryde's whales is thought to have begun from coastal stations in Japan in 1906, where it continued uninterrupted until 1987—they were also caught offshore in the western North Pacific by both Japanese (1971–1979) and Soviet (1966–1979) fleets, as well as from Taiwan (1976–1980), the Bonin Islands (1946–1952 and 1981–1987), and the Philippines (1983–1985). In 1997, an estimated over 20,000 Bryde's whales had been caught in the western North Pacific between 1911 and 1987 (the Japanese were later found to have falsified their reported take from the Bonin Islands between 1981 and 1987, reporting a catch of only 2,659 instead of the true take of 4,162). A population assessment done in the mid-1990s stated that the population in the western North Pacific may have declined by as much as 49% during 1911–1996. Norwegian factory ships off Baja California took an additional 34 Bryde's whales between 1924 and 1929; two were also caught off central California in 1966.

An estimated 5,542 Bryde's whales were caught off Peru between 1968 and 1983, including a reported catch of 3,589 between 1973 and 1983. An unknown number were also caught off Chile from 1932 to 1979. Over 2,000 were caught off Cape Province, South Africa, from 1911 to 1967, most (1,300) during 1947–1967. The majority of the 2,536 sei whales caught by the pirate whaler Sierra in the South Atlantic between 1969 and 1976 are believed to have been Bryde's whales. At least some Bryde's whales were among the 5,000 sei whales recorded in the catch off Brazil from 1948 to 1977, but possibly only 8%.

Over 30,000 Bryde's whales were caught between 1911 and 1987, including over 1,400 taken by the Soviets in the Southern Hemisphere from 1948 to 1973 (only 19 were reported). The peak reported catches were reached in 1973–74 and 1974–75, when over 1,800 were taken each year.

=== Other threats and incidents ===
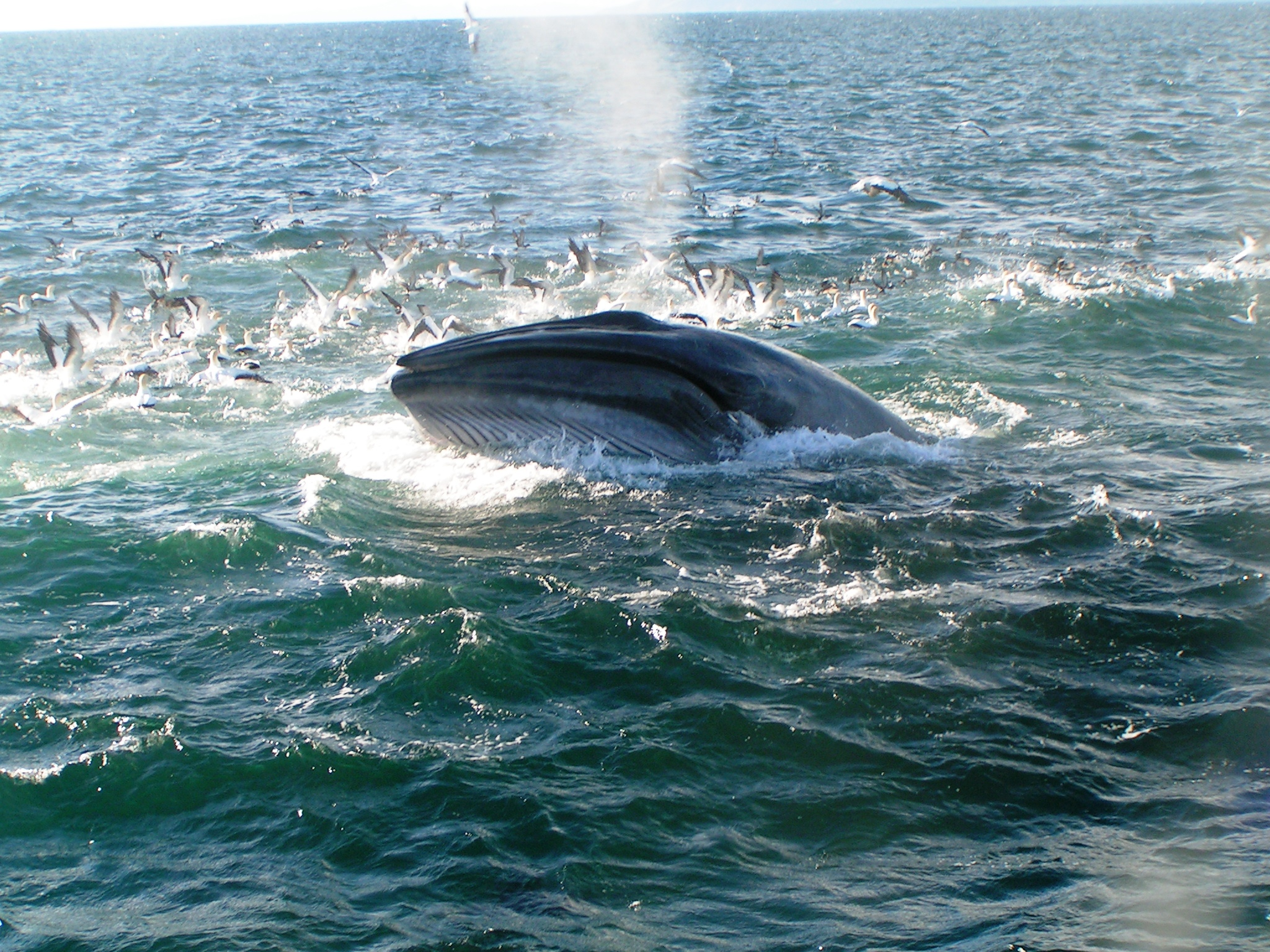
Bryde's whale is listed as National Critical in New Zealand.

Around 2011, a videographer named Michael Fishbach filmed a Bryde's whale weighing 18 t (18 long tons; 20 short tons) being hunted and killed by a pack of 20 orca in the Sea of Cortez.

Bryde's whales have not been reported as taken or injured in fishing operations. They are sometimes killed or injured by ship strikes. Anthropogenic noise is an increasing concern for all rorquals, which communicate by low-frequency sounds.

These whales are protected off the US by the Marine Mammal Protection Act of 1972.

In March 2019, a diver off the coast of South Africa was accidentally caught in the mouth of a feeding Bryde's whale. The diver and tour-operator, Rainer Schimpf, was photographing sharks circling a bait-ball of fish, when the whale suddenly appeared from below and opened its mouth near the surface in an attempt to swallow the fish. In doing so, it accidentally engulfed Schimpf as well; his entire upper body (down to his waist) went into the whale's mouth. The whale gripped him with its jaws for a few moments as Schimpf held his breath and feared the whale would deep dive. Soon after the whale submerged again, it quickly spat Schimpf (who was unharmed) back out and swam away.

Tourists on jet skis have harassed whales off the gulf coast of Phetchaburi Province, Thailand.

== See also ==
- List of cetaceans
- Marine biology

== Bibliography ==
- Baker, A. N.; Madon, B. (2007). "Bryde's Whales (Balaenoptera cf. brydei Olsen 1913) in the Hauraki Gulf and Northeastern New Zealand Waters" (PDF). Science for Conservation 272. Wellington, New Zealand: Science & Technical Publishing, Department of Conservation. Archived (PDF) from the original on 28 January 2019.
- Carwardine, Mark (2000) [1995]. Whales, Dolphins and Porpoises. Dorling Kindersley Handbooks. Illustrated by Martin Camm (Reprinted with corrections ed.). London: Dorling Kindersley. ISBN 978-0-7513-2781-6. OCLC 455614634.
- Perrin, William F.; Würsig, Bernd G.; Thewissen, J. G. M., eds. (2002). Encyclopedia of Marine Mammals. San Diego: Academic Press. ISBN 0-12-551340-2. OCLC 48969234.
- Reeves, Randall R.; Stewart, Brent S.; Clapham, Phil; Powell, James A. (2002). National Audubon Society Guide to Marine Mammals of the World. Illustrated by Pieter A. Folkens (First ed.). New York: Alfred A. Knopf; National Audubon Society. ISBN 0-375-41141-0. OCLC 47073007.
- [Star, The] (16 December 2006). "Named After a Norwegian Diplomat". The Star. Malaysia. Archived from the original on 20 February 2009.
- Würtz, Maurizio; Repetto, Nadia (1998). Whales and Dolphins: Guide to the Biology and Behaviour of Cetaceans. Translated by Studio Traduzioni Vecchia (English translated ed.). Shrewsbury, UK: Swan Hill Press. ISBN 1-84037-043-2. OCLC 41421392.
