= Baisha, Hepu County =

Baisha 白沙镇
- Town
- Location in Guangxi
- Coordinates: 21°42′15″N 109°41′5″E
- Country: People's Republic of China
- Autonomous Region: Guangxi
- Prefecture-level city: Beihai
- County: Hepu County
- Time zone: UTC+8 (China Standard)

Baisha (Chinese: 白沙) is a town of Hepu County, Guangxi, China. As of 2018, it has one residential community and 23 villages under its administration.
