= Lianzhou, Guangxi =

Lianzhou 廉州镇 Limchow
- Town
- Location in Guangxi
- Coordinates: 21°39′46″N 109°11′47″E
- Country: People's Republic of China
- Autonomous Region: Guangxi
- Prefecture-level city: Beihai
- County: Hepu County
- Time zone: UTC+8 (China Standard)

Lianzhou (Chinese: 廉州) town is the county seat of Hepu County, Guangxi, China. As of 2018, it has 15 residential communities, 16 villages and one industrial park community under its administration.
