= Weizhou, Guangxi =

Weizhou 涠洲镇
- Town
- Location in the South China Sea Weizhou (South China Sea) Weizhou (China)
- Coordinates: 21°01′17″N 109°07′17″E
- Country: People's Republic of China
- Autonomous region: Guangxi
- Prefecture-level city: Beihai
- District: Haicheng

Area
  - Total: 26.63 km^{2} (10.28 sq mi)

Population
  - Total: 14,800
  - Density: 556/km^{2} (1,440/sq mi)
- Time zone: UTC+8 (China Standard)
- Postal code: 536000
- Area code: 0779

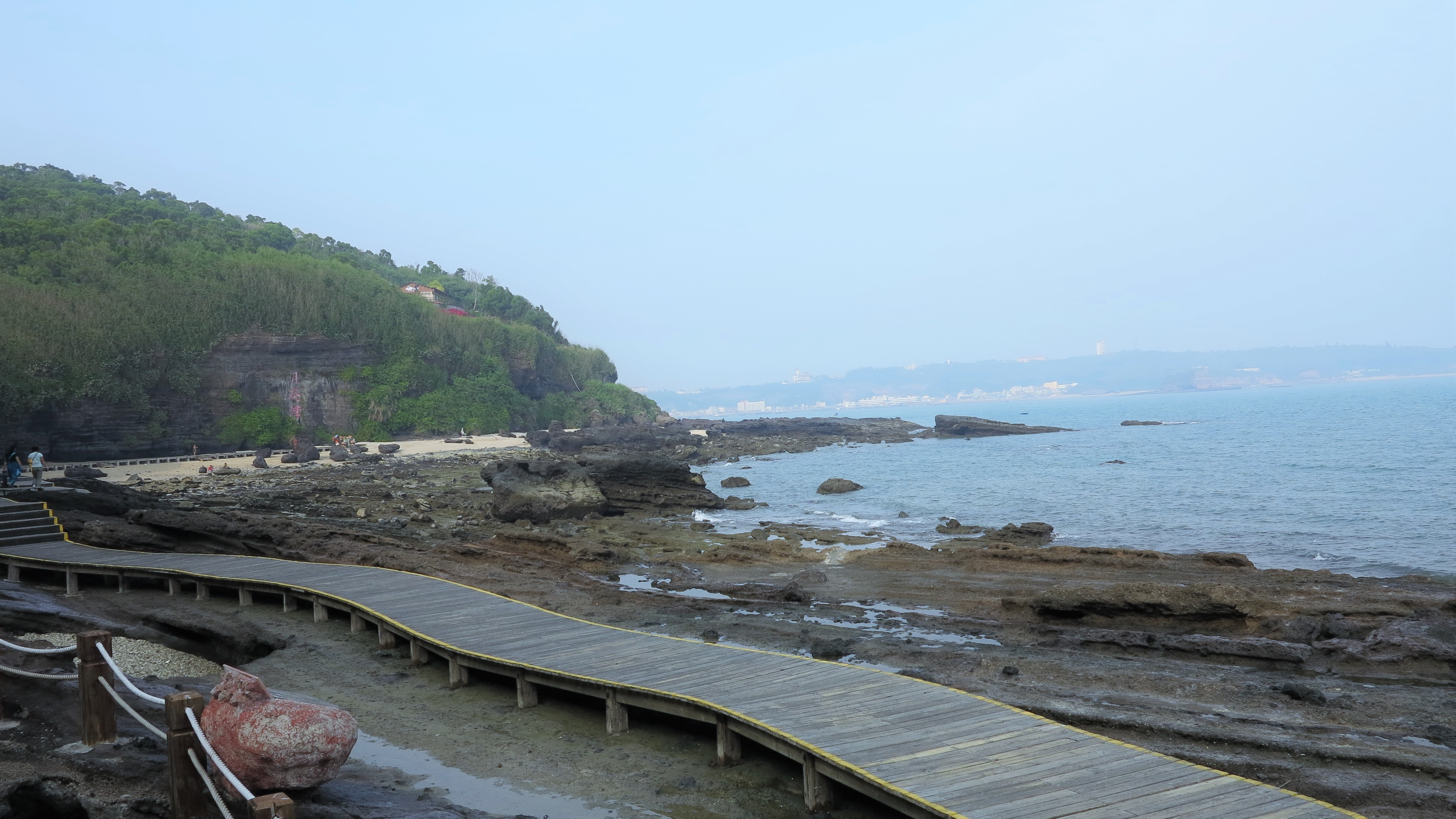
Beihai Weizhou Island Moon Bay

Weizhou (simplified Chinese: 涠洲镇; traditional Chinese: 潿洲鎮; pinyin: Wéizhōu Zhèn; Jyutping: Wai^{4}zau^{1} Zan^{3}) is a town of Haicheng District, Beihai, Guangxi, People's Republic of China. The town comprises two Gulf of Tonkin islands: Weizhou Island and a smaller 1.89 square kilometres (0.73 sq mi) Xieyang Island (斜阳岛), covering an area of 26.63 km^{2} (10.28 sq mi) and with a population of 15,900. It includes 2 neighborhood committees, 9 village committees. As of 2011, it has 2 residential communities (社区) and 9 villages under its administration.

== See also ==
- List of township-level divisions of Guangxi
