= Zhou Wei =

Zhou Wei may refer to:

- Zhou Wei (lawyer) (born 1956), Chinese constitutional law scholar and lawyer
- Zhou Wei (zoologist) (born 1957), Chinese zoologist
- Zhou Wei (athlete) (born 1976), Chinese track and field athlete
- Zhao Wei (born 1976), Chinese actress
