= Xieyang Island =

Island belonging to China

Coordinates: 20°54′29″N 109°12′52″E

Xieyang Island 斜阳岛
- Locator map of Xieyang including neighboring Weizhou

Geography
- Area: 1.89 km^{2} (0.73 sq mi)
- Length: 1.9 km (1.18 mi)
- Width: 1.4 km (0.87 mi)
- Highest elevation: 140.9 m (462.3 ft)
- Highest point: Yangwei Peak (羊尾岭)

Administration
- People's Republic of China
- Region: Guangxi
- Prefecture-level city: Beihai
- District: Haicheng
- Town: Weizhou

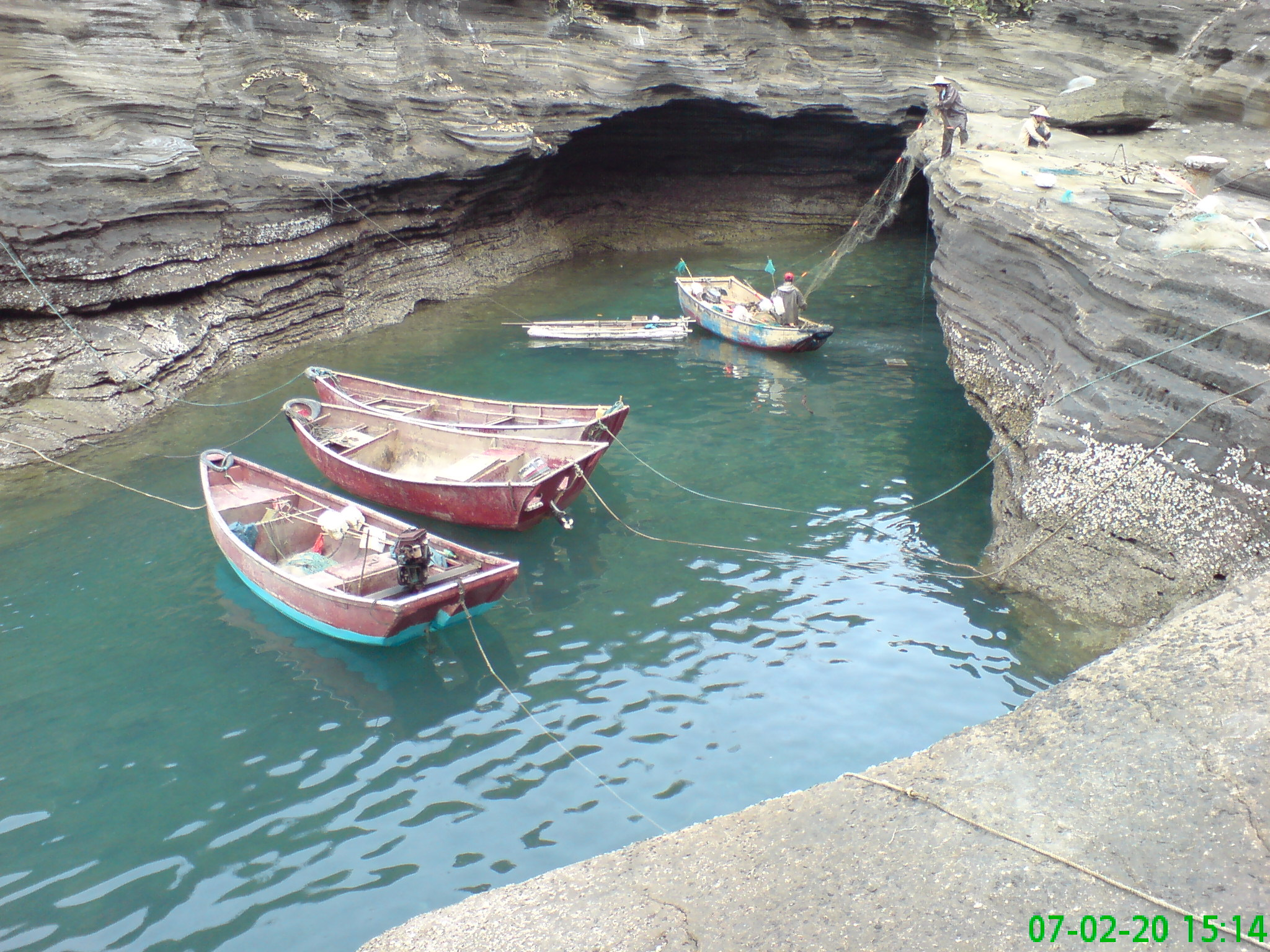
Photo by the hermit from Mount Fanma

Xieyang Island (simplified Chinese: 斜阳岛; traditional Chinese: 斜陽島; pinyin: Xiéyáng Dǎo; Jyutping: ce^{4}joeng^{4}; lit. 'setting sun') is a Chinese island in the Gulf of Tonkin, located 17 km (11 mi) south-east of Weizhou Island, the largest island of Guangxi. Administratively it, along with Weizhou Island, forms the town of Weizhou, in Haicheng District, Beihai, Guangxi. It is one of the tourist attractions of Beihai.

== Geography ==
Xieyang has an area of only 1.89 km^{2} (0.73 sq mi) and is of volcanic origin. The island may be described as appearing like a goat with its front legs crouched, and so in ancient times was called "斜羊島".

=== Environment ===
Along with Weizhou , waters around Xieyang were discovered in 2015 to be seasonally frequented by Bryde's whales, and the area has become the first acknowledged location among mainland coasts of China to have regular migrations of large cetaceans.

Xieyang, along with nearby Weizhou, has been designated an Important Bird Area (IBA) by BirdLife International because it supports significant populations of Chinese egrets and fairy pittas.
