= Haicheng District =

Haicheng 海城区 · Haijcwngz Gih
- District
- Location in Guangxi
- Coordinates: 21°28′30″N 109°07′05″E
- Country: China
- Autonomous region: Guangxi
- Prefecture-level city: Beihai
- Township-level divisions: 7 subdistricts 1 town
- District seat: Zhongjie Subdistrict

Area
  - Total: 140 km^{2} (54 sq mi)
- Elevation: 105 m (344 ft)

Population (2020 census)
  - Total: 527,895
  - Density: 3,800/km^{2} (9,800/sq mi)
- Time zone: UTC+8 (China Standard)
- Postal code: 536000
- Area code: 0779
- Website: www.bhhc.gov.cn

Haicheng (Chinese: 海城; pinyin: Hǎichéng; Jyutping: hoi^{2}sing^{4}; lit. 'sea city'; Zhuang: Haijcwngz) is the seat of the city of Beihai, Guangxi, China. It has an area of 140 square kilometres (54 sq mi) and a population of 240,000 as of 2004.

== Administrative divisions ==
Haicheng District is divided into 7 subdistricts and 1 town:

Subdistricts:

- Zhongjie Subdistrict (中街街道), Dongjie Subdistrict (东街街道), Xijie Subdistrict (西街街道), Haijiao Subdistrict (海角街道), Dijiao Subdistrict (地角街道), Gaode Subdistrict (高德街道), Yima Subdistrict (驿马街道)

The only town is Weizhou (涠洲镇).

== See also ==
- List of administrative divisions of Guangxi
- Weizhou Island
- Xieyang Island
