= Hepu County =

Hepu County 合浦县 Hoppo; Limchow
- County
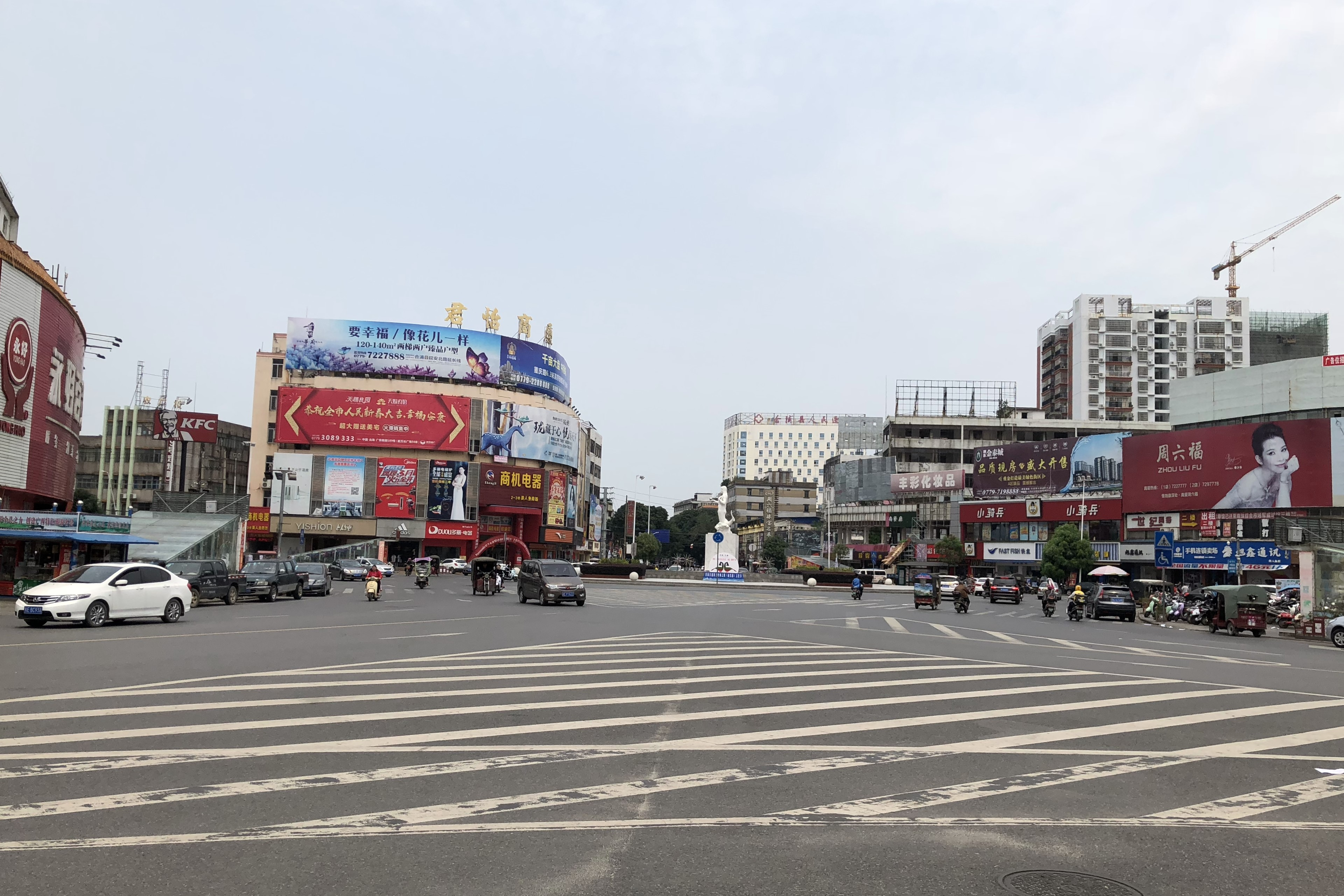

- Location of the seat in Guangxi
- Coordinates: 21°40′N 109°12′E
- Country: China
- Province: Guangxi
- Prefecture-level city: Beihai
- County seat: Lianzhou

Area
  - Total: 2,380 km^{2} (920 sq mi)
- Elevation: 12 m (39 ft)

Population (2003)
  - Total: 930,914
  - Density: 391/km^{2} (1,010/sq mi)
- Time zone: UTC+8 (China Standard)
- Postal code: 536100
- Area code: 0779

Hepu (Chinese: 合浦; pinyin: Hépǔ), alternately romanized as Hoppo, Hopu or Hop'u, is a county under the administration of Beihai City in southeastern Guangxi, China. It borders Lianjiang (Guangdong) to the southeast, Bobai County to the northeast, the Gulf of Tonkin to the south, Qinzhou to the west, and Pubei County to the north. Then-Premier Li Peng called this place "the Southern Pearl County" (南珠之乡) in November 1992. The county was once known as Lianzhou (Postal: Limchow). It has an area of 2,380 km^{2} (920 sq mi) and a population of 930,914 as of 2003.

About 300,000 of the inhabitants are of Hakka descent.

== History ==
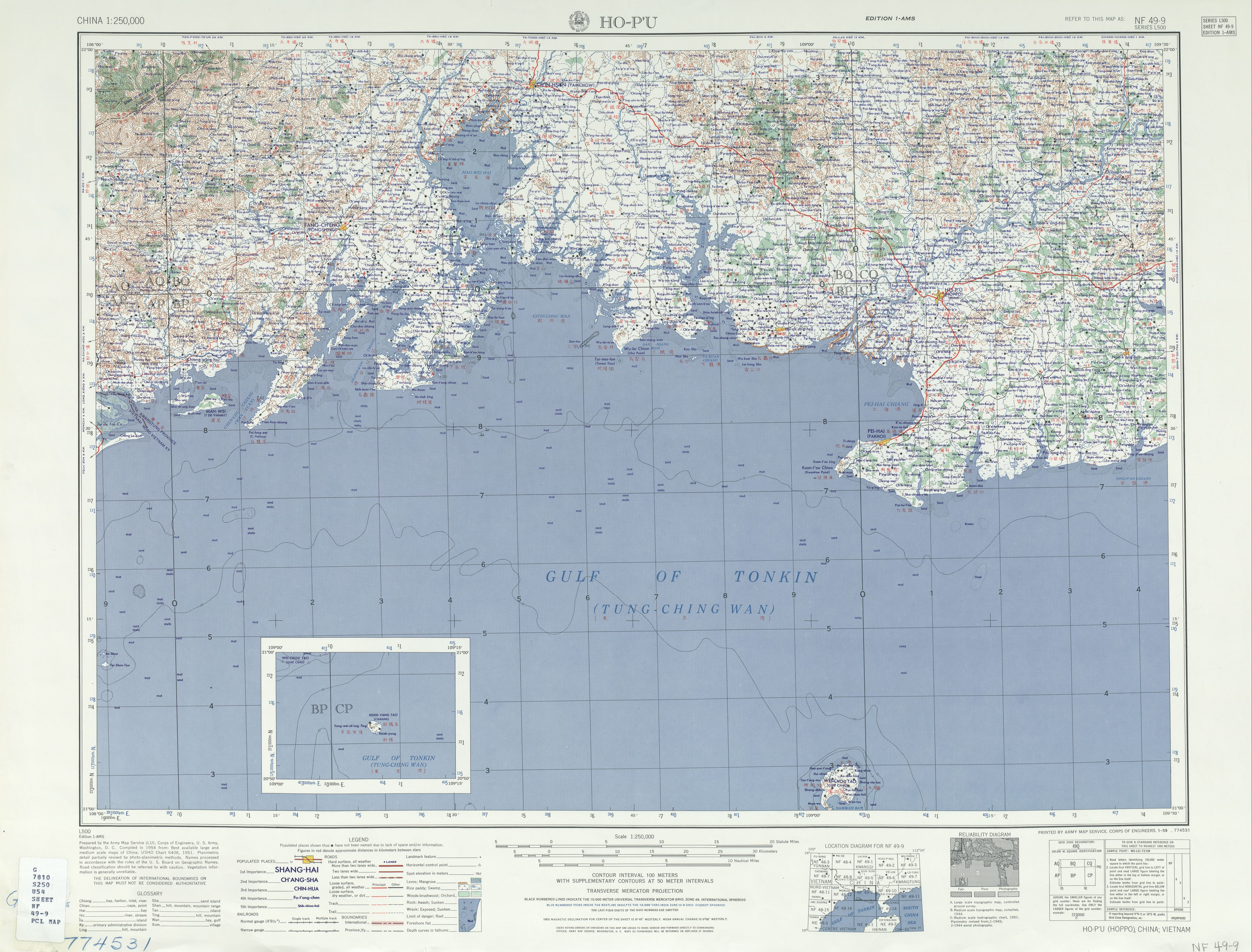
Hepu (labelled as HO-P'U (HOPPO) 合浦) (1954)

In antiquity, Hepu county was originally part of a larger county which encompassed part of Guangxi, Guangdong and even parts of Hainan. It was established in 111 BCE by Emperor Wu of the Han dynasty, during the first Chinese domination of Vietnam. During the brief interruption of the Han dynasty by Wang Mang, many of his opponents were exiled and banished to Hepu.

- 1949–1950: Hepu administered Beihai as a town
- June 1965: administered by Qinzhou Region of Guangxi, prior
- July 1, 1987: administered by Beihai City

== Administrative divisions ==
The county administers 14 towns and 1 township:

Towns: Lianzhou (廉州镇), Dangjiang (党江镇), Xichang (西场镇), Shagang (沙岗镇), Wujia (乌家镇), Zhakou (闸口镇), Gongguan (公馆镇), Baisha (白沙镇), Shankou (山口镇), Shatian (沙田镇), Shiwan (石湾镇), Shikang (石康镇), Changle (常乐镇), Xingdaohu (星岛湖镇)

Township: Quzhang Township (曲樟乡)

== Transportation ==
- China National Highway 209

== Famous people ==
- Lao Yi

== Climate ==
Climate data for Hepu, elevation 6 m (20 ft), (1991–2020 normals, extremes 1975–2010)
Month	Jan	Feb	Mar	Apr	May	Jun	Jul	Aug	Sep	Oct	Nov	Dec	Year
Record high °C (°F)	28.9 (84.0)	32.0 (89.6)	32.7 (90.9)	34.5 (94.1)	37.4 (99.3)	37.1 (98.8)	37.6 (99.7)	37.5 (99.5)	37.3 (99.1)	35.0 (95.0)	32.6 (90.7)	29.7 (85.5)	37.6 (99.7)
Mean daily maximum °C (°F)	19.1 (66.4)	20.8 (69.4)	23.5 (74.3)	27.8 (82.0)	31.3 (88.3)	32.3 (90.1)	32.5 (90.5)	32.5 (90.5)	32.0 (89.6)	29.9 (85.8)	26.1 (79.0)	21.4 (70.5)	27.4 (81.4)
Daily mean °C (°F)	14.9 (58.8)	16.7 (62.1)	19.6 (67.3)	24.0 (75.2)	27.4 (81.3)	28.9 (84.0)	29.0 (84.2)	28.7 (83.7)	27.7 (81.9)	25.2 (77.4)	21.2 (70.2)	16.8 (62.2)	23.3 (74.0)
Mean daily minimum °C (°F)	12.1 (53.8)	14.0 (57.2)	17.0 (62.6)	21.4 (70.5)	24.6 (76.3)	26.4 (79.5)	26.4 (79.5)	26.0 (78.8)	24.9 (76.8)	22.0 (71.6)	17.9 (64.2)	13.5 (56.3)	20.5 (68.9)
Record low °C (°F)	2.0 (35.6)	2.2 (36.0)	3.4 (38.1)	9.5 (49.1)	15.1 (59.2)	19.8 (67.6)	22.2 (72.0)	21.1 (70.0)	15.9 (60.6)	11.5 (52.7)	6.3 (43.3)	−0.8 (30.6)	−0.8 (30.6)
Average precipitation mm (inches)	42.3 (1.67)	38.1 (1.50)	54.9 (2.16)	80.7 (3.18)	142.8 (5.62)	304.5 (11.99)	432.2 (17.02)	403.1 (15.87)	197.3 (7.77)	85.5 (3.37)	55.7 (2.19)	29.1 (1.15)	1,866.2 (73.49)
Average precipitation days (≥ 0.1 mm)	8.3	9.1	12.1	11.0	11.8	15.7	17.3	18.7	12.8	6.9	5.9	6.0	135.6
Average relative humidity (%)	76	80	83	82	80	82	82	83	79	73	72	70	79
Mean monthly sunshine hours	97.2	83.3	85.0	129.5	207.1	198.9	220.5	211.5	210.2	215.0	175.6	138.3	1,972.1
Percentage possible sunshine	29	26	23	34	51	50	54	53	58	60	53	41	44
Source: China Meteorological Administrationall-time extreme low
