= Tieshangang District =

Tieshangang 铁山港区
- District
- Location within Guangxi
- Coordinates: 21°31′44″N 109°25′19″E
- Country: China
- Autonomous region: Guangxi
- Prefecture-level city: Beihai
- District seat: Nankang

Area
  - Total: 394 km^{2} (152 sq mi)

Population
  - Total: 160,000
  - Density: 410/km^{2} (1,100/sq mi)
- Time zone: UTC+8 (China Standard)

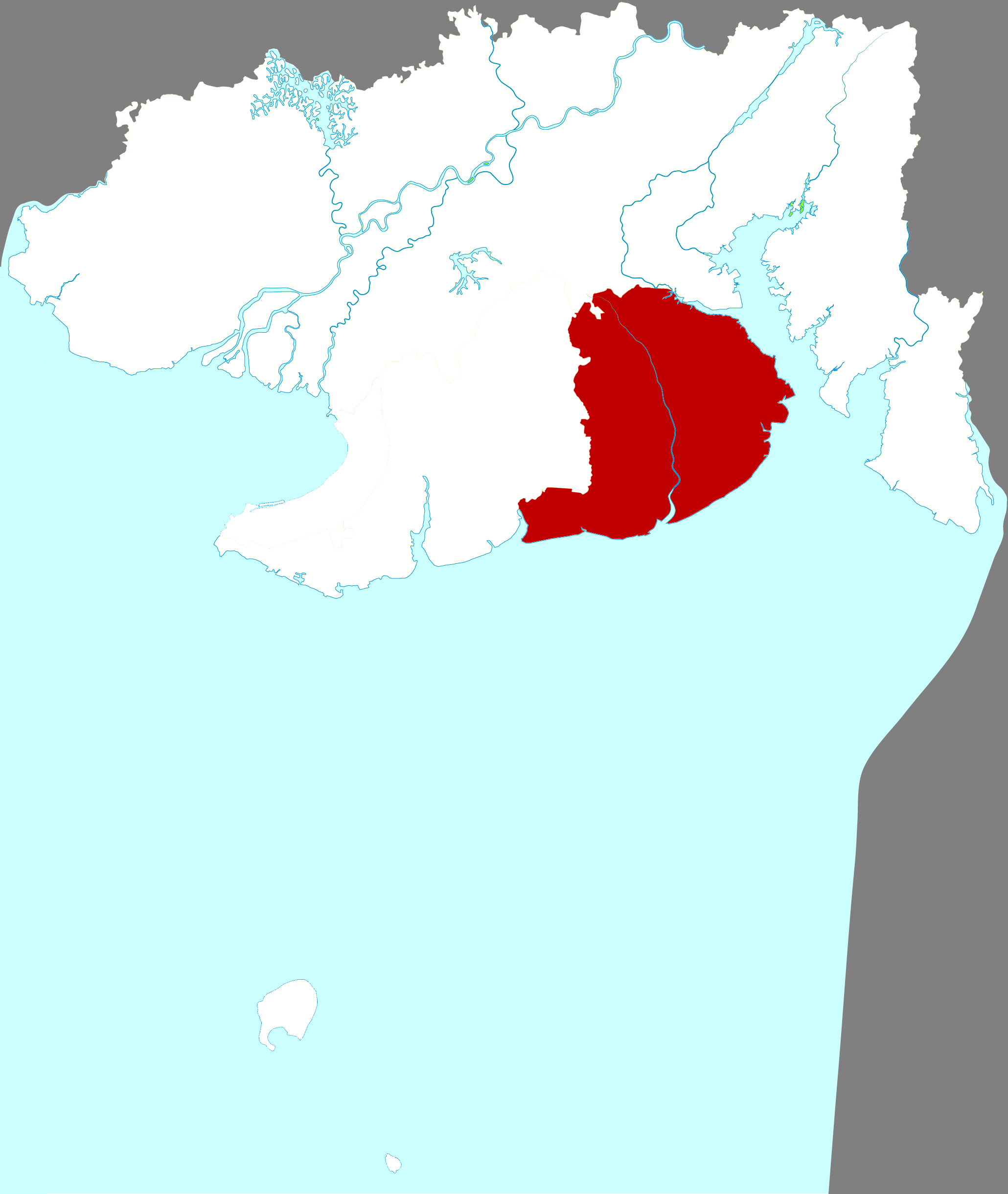
Map of Tieshangang district in Beihai City

Tieshangang District (simplified Chinese: 铁山港区; traditional Chinese: 鐵山港區; pinyin: Tiěshāngǎng Qū; lit. 'Tieshan Port District'), is a district of the city of Beihai, Guangxi, China. It has 3 neighborhood committees and 39 village committees.

== Administrative divisions ==
Tieshangang District is divided into 3 towns:

- Nankang (南康镇)
- Yingpan (营盘镇)
- Xinggang (兴港镇)

== Transportation ==
The Yulin–Tieshangang railway carries freight services to and from the coast.
