= Weizhou Island =

Island in Guangxi, China

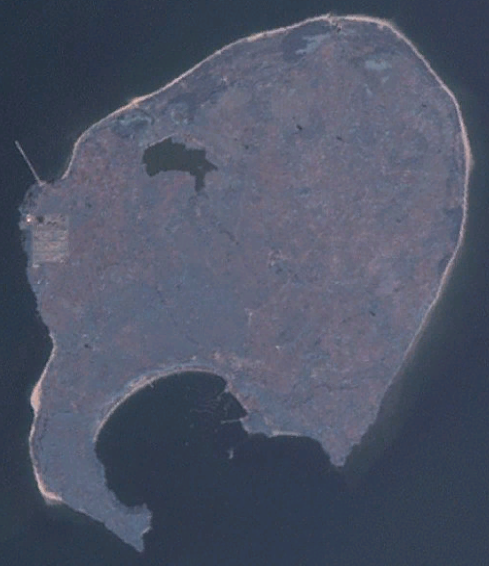

Geography
- Area: 24.74 km^{2} (9.55 sq mi)
- Length: 6.5 km (4.04 mi)
- Width: 6 km (3.7 mi)
- Coastline: 15.6 km (9.69 mi)

Administration
- China
- Autonomous region: Guangxi
- Prefecture-level city: Beihai

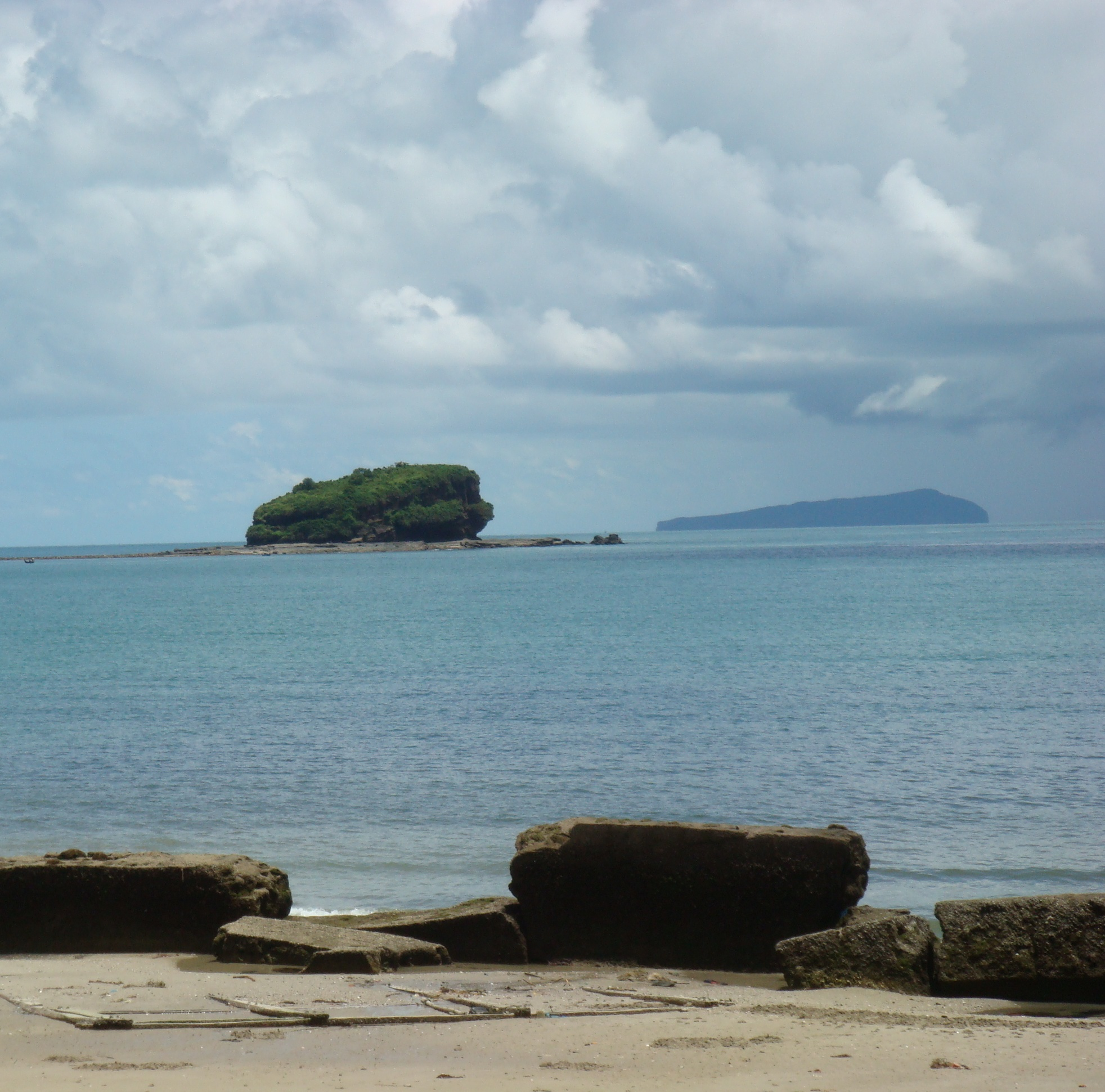
The Pig Rock and Xieyang Island from Weizhou Island

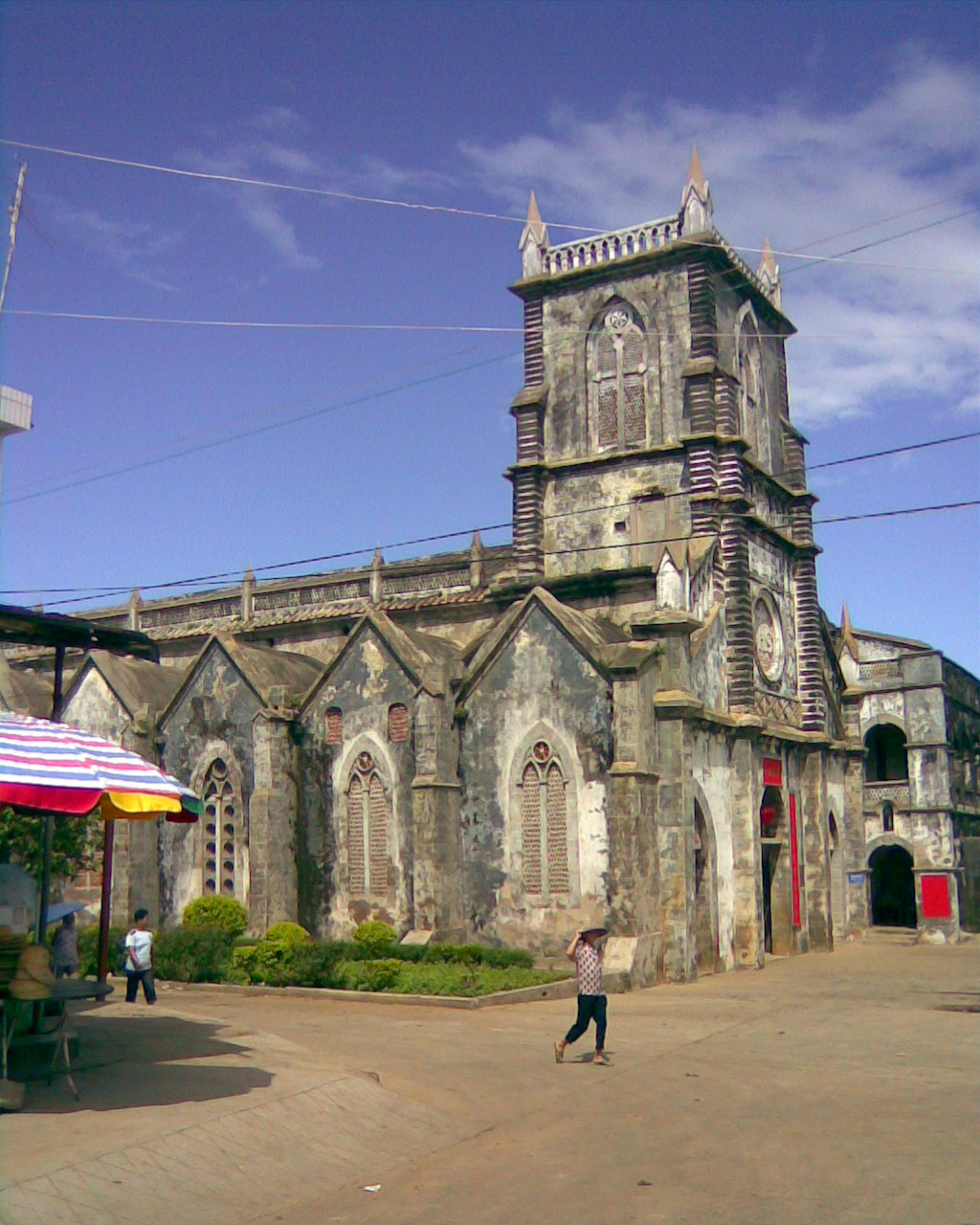
Church (涠洲天主教堂) in Shengtang Village

Weizhou Island (simplified Chinese: 涠洲岛; traditional Chinese: 潿洲島; pinyin: Wéizhōu Dǎo) is a Chinese island in Beibu Gulf in the Gulf of Tonkin. The largest island of Guangxi Zhuang Autonomous Region, Weizhou is west of Leizhou Peninsula, south of Beihai, and east of Vietnam. Administratively, it is part of Weizhou Town, Haicheng District of Beihai City. The name derives from Chinese 潿 wéi ("still water") and 洲 zhōu ("river islet").

== Geography ==
Its north–south length is 6.5 km (4.0 mi), east–west 6 km (3.7 mi). The coast is 15.6 km (9.7 mi), with 6–10 km (3.7–6.2 mi) of sandy beach. Weizhou rises in the south, where Nanwan Port (南灣港; pinyin: nánwān gǎng) is located. Coral reefs have been established around the island.

== Climate ==
Climate data for Weizhou Island, elevation 55 m (180 ft), (1991–2020 normals)
Month	Jan	Feb	Mar	Apr	May	Jun	Jul	Aug	Sep	Oct	Nov	Dec	Year
Mean daily maximum °C (°F)	18.8 (65.8)	20.2 (68.4)	22.9 (73.2)	26.8 (80.2)	30.0 (86.0)	31.4 (88.5)	31.6 (88.9)	31.2 (88.2)	30.5 (86.9)	28.4 (83.1)	25.1 (77.2)	20.8 (69.4)	26.5 (79.7)
Daily mean °C (°F)	15.7 (60.3)	16.8 (62.2)	19.5 (67.1)	23.5 (74.3)	26.9 (80.4)	28.9 (84.0)	29.1 (84.4)	28.7 (83.7)	27.8 (82.0)	25.5 (77.9)	22.0 (71.6)	17.6 (63.7)	23.5 (74.3)
Mean daily minimum °C (°F)	13.6 (56.5)	14.8 (58.6)	17.4 (63.3)	21.4 (70.5)	24.8 (76.6)	26.9 (80.4)	27.1 (80.8)	26.6 (79.9)	25.6 (78.1)	23.4 (74.1)	19.8 (67.6)	15.5 (59.9)	21.4 (70.5)
Average precipitation mm (inches)	27.7 (1.09)	25.8 (1.02)	48.2 (1.90)	50.0 (1.97)	97.3 (3.83)	201.7 (7.94)	259.4 (10.21)	341.0 (13.43)	216.4 (8.52)	103.4 (4.07)	42.1 (1.66)	31.5 (1.24)	1,444.5 (56.88)
Average precipitation days	7.3	7.8	9.6	8.7	8.1	10.5	12.5	14.5	11.6	6.7	5.7	5.5	108.5
Average relative humidity (%)	82	85	88	87	85	83	81	83	81	76	76	75	82
Mean monthly sunshine hours	118.8	104.7	118.5	161.0	237.9	232.5	248.5	226.3	218.4	226.7	187.4	148.0	2,228.7
Percentage possible sunshine	35	32	32	42	58	58	61	57	60	63	56	44	50
Source: China Meteorological Administration

== Geology ==
Weizhou Island is China's youngest volcanic island. Its origin is probably from a mantle plume that rose 50–32 million years ago, as a result from the collision of the Indian and Eurasian plates. When the plume reached the asthenosphere, it helped to create the South China Sea by the plume's lateral flow. An evidence that the plume still exists is that a lot of basalt has since the Pliocene erupted in the South China Sea and its adjacent areas, for example the Yandunling (烟墩岭) and Yantouling (烟头岭) volcanoes, Leiqiong (雷琼) volcano group, Weizhou Island and Xieyang Island.

The mantle below the Weizhou island has an average temperature of 1,661 °C, which is between the corresponding values of the Hawaii hotspot and the Iceland hotspot.

There have been four periods of volcanic activity on the site, the first one occurred in the early Pleistocene, when mainly ash began to erupt from the bottom of the sea. The second time, between 9–225 million years ago, started with basaltic magma eruptions, and ended with pyroclastic eruptions. This was the time with the heaviest eruptions on Weizhou and Xieyang. The third time began with large amounts of volcanic bombs and ended with basaltic magma, this was from 200,000 to 15,000 years ago. The fourth time, from 10,000 to 7,100 years ago, a few intermittent eruptions happened, first mainly with volcanic bombs, and in the end volcanic ash.

== History ==
From 1869 to 1879, the French built a Gothic-style 15 metre Catholic church (涠洲天主教堂) in Shengtang Village (盛塘村; pinyin: shèngtáng cūn), Weizhou. Weizhou Chengzai Church (城仔教堂) was built in 1880, also by French Catholics.

== Wildlife ==
Along with smaller Xieyang Island, Weizhou island is a nature reserve named Beihai Weizhoudao Volcano National Geopark to preserve its volcanic features, and protect rich local ecosystem engulfing 147 species of migratory and non-migratory birds, including threatened species such as black-faced spoonbills. An autonomous region-level bird nature reserve was established in 1982, and a bird ringing station for migratory birds was established in 1985. The protected area is located between 20°54′-21°05′N and 109°05′-109°13′E, including Weizhou Island and Xieyang Island, with a total area of 26.3 km^{2} (10.2 sq mi). Weizhou, along with nearby Xieyang, has been designated an Important Bird Area (IBA) by BirdLife International because it supports significant populations of Chinese egrets and fairy pittas.

Calm and shallow waters around the two islands have shown recoveries in recent years, resulting in sustaining varieties of marine life from coral reefs to megafaunas that are becoming increasingly common in the area. These include such as sea turtles, whale sharks, and several species of cetaceans including endangered Indo-Pacific finless porpoises, nationally protected Chinese white dolphins, and even a blue whale appeared in the waters in 2017. Hepu Dugong National Nature Reserve established in 1992 covers nearby areas and which is the only sanctuary for dugongs in China.

Since 2015, seasonal presences of Bryde's whales around Weizhou and Xieyang Islands have been recognized, making the discovery the first confirmed case of large cetaceans regularly inhabiting mainland coasts of China. To protect whales, the local government set a new regulation to prohibit fishery within 6 km of the island. Additionally, the fishery administration has begun patrolling to monitor the public not to engage in whale watching activities until the condition of whales have been thoroughly and scientifically assessed.
