= Zhou Wei (lawyer) =

Zhou Wei (Chinese: 周伟; pinyin: Zhōu Wěi; born April 1956) is a Chinese constitutional law scholar and lawyer, professor at Sichuan University Law School.

Zhou was born in Zhongjiang County, Sichuan in 1956. He received his Master of Laws degree from Southwest University of Political Science & Law in 1988, and Doctor of Laws from Wuhan University in 1998.

Zhou is known for his involvement in several high-profile legal cases, including an employment discrimination case in 2002, and a HBV carrier discrimination case in 2003.
