= Yinhai District =

Yinhai 银海区 · Yinzhaij Gih
- District
- Location in Guangxi
- Coordinates: 21°26′56″N 109°08′24″E
- Country: China
- Autonomous region: Guangxi
- Prefecture-level city: Beihai

Area
  - Total: 423 km^{2} (163 sq mi)

Population (2020)
  - Total: 315,196
  - Density: 745/km^{2} (1,930/sq mi)
- Time zone: UTC+8 (China Standard)

Yinhai District (simplified Chinese: 银海区; traditional Chinese: 銀海區; pinyin: Yínhǎi Qū; lit. 'Silver sea', Cantonese: Ngan Hoi; Zhuang: Yinzhaij Gih) is a district of the city of Beihai, Guangxi, China.

== Administrative divisions ==
Yinhai District is divided into 4 towns:

- Pingyang (平阳)
- Yintan (银滩)
- Qiaogang (侨港)
- Fucheng (福成)
