= List of bus routes in Guangzhou =

The following is a list of current bus routes in Guangzhou (including Nansha, Panyu, Huadu, Zengcheng and Conghua districts) and inter-city bus service between Guangzhou and Foshan or Dongguan.

== Operators ==
| Operator | Operator (in Chinese) | Operator | Operator (in Chinese) |
|---|---|---|---|
| Guangzhou No.1 Bus | 广州市一汽巴士有限公司 | Guangzhou Jinxin Bus | 广州锦信公交有限公司 |
| Guangzhou Public Transport 2nd Bus | 广州公交集团第二公共汽车有限公司 | Guangzhou Nansha Runxin Bus | 广州南沙润信公交有限公司 |
| Guangzhou No.2 Bus | 广州市第二巴士有限公司 | Guangzhou Chuangda Bus | 广州创大公交有限公司 |
| Guangzhou Xinfuli Bus Service | 广州市新福利巴士服务有限公司 | Guangzhou Shuntu Bus | 广州顺途公共汽车有限公司 |
| Guangzhou Yitong Bus | 广州市溢通巴士有限公司 | Guangzhou Huadu Bus | 广州市花都公共汽车有限公司 |
| Guangzhou Panguang Transport | 广州市番广客运有限公司 | Guangzhou Fudu Transport | 广州市富都客运有限公司 |
| Guangzhou Huadu Hengtong Transport | 广州花都恒通客运发展有限公司 | Guangzhou Baiyun International Airport Transport | 广州白云国际机场空港快线运输有限公司 |
| Guangzhou Conghua Bus | 广州市从化公共汽车有限公司 | Guangzhou Litong Bus | 广州市荔通公共汽车有限公司 |
| Guangzhou Public Transport 3rd Bus | 广州公交集团第三公共汽车有限公司 | Guangzhou Transport Zengcheng Branch | 广州市运输有限公司增城分公司 |
| Guangzhou Twin City Sightseeing Bus | 广州市双城观光巴士有限公司 | Guangzhou Yueyun Transport | 广州市粤运汽车运输有限公司 |
| Guangzhou Public Transport Trolleybus | 广州公交集团电车有限公司 | Guangzhou Transportation Group Nansha Bus | 广州交通集团南沙巴士有限公司 |
| Guangzhou Sunshine Bus | 广州新穗巴士有限公司 | Guangzhou Nansha Transport Development | 广州南沙交通发展有限公司 |
| Guangzhou Jumbo Bus | 广州珍宝巴士有限公司 | Guangzhou Nansha Economic Zone Puzhou Transport | 广州南沙经济技术开发区蒲洲汽车运输有限公司 |
| Guangzhou White Horse Bus | 广州市白马巴士有限公司 | (Other operators) | (其他公司) |
| Guangzhou J.C. Bus | 广州马会巴士有限公司 | (Multi operators) | (多于一间公司) |
| Guangzhou Panyu Bus | 广州市番禺区公共汽车有限公司 | | |

== Downtown routes ==
=== 1–100 ===
| Route | Terminal | | | Notes |
|---|---|---|---|---|
| 1 | Dongshan (Shuqian Lu) | ↔ | Fangcun Garden South Entrance | |
| 2 | Jincheng Garden (Dongfengdong) | ↔ | Pantang | |
| 3 | Dongshan (Guigang) | ↔ | Ruyifang | |
| 4 | Baiyun Lu | ↔ | R&F Peach Garden (Zengbu Village) | |
| 5 | Guangzhou Coach Terminal | ↔ | Haizhu Coach Terminal | |
| 6 | Huangsha | ↔ | Tianhebei | |
| 7 | Dashatou | ↔ | Shicha Lu (Jinbi Xincheng) | |
| 8 | Pleasant View Garden | ↔ | Pantang | |
| 9 | Haizhu Coach Terminal | ↔ | Xihua Lu End | |
| 10 | Changgang Lu | ↔ | Hengfu Lu | |
| 11 | Guangzhou East railway station | ↔ | The Memorial Museum of the Generalissimo Sun Yat-sen's Mansion | |
| Guangzhou 12 | (GZ) Ersha Island West | ↔ | (FS) Vanke Wonderland | |
| Guangzhou 12A | (FS) Vanke Wonderland | ↺ | (FS) Vanke Wonderland | One-way loop route. |
| 13 | Wende Lu | ↔ | Haizhu Coach Terminal | |
| 14 | Chisha (Guangdong University of Finance & Economics) | ↔ | Guangwei Lu | |
| 15 | Xihua Lu End | ↔ | Fenshui Residential Area | |
| 16 | Yuangang (Yuanyang Tianjiao) | ↔ | Fenghuanggang | |
| 17 | Dexing Lu (Shangxiajiu Pedestrian Street) | ↔ | Shijing (Guangdong College of Science and Trade) | |
| 17 Short Route | Dexing Lu (Shangxiajiu Pedestrian Street) | ↔ | Huanggang (Jindong Fashion Market) | |
| 18 | Chisha (Guangdong University of Finance & Economics) | ↔ | Tianhe Sports Center | |
| 19 | The V Valley in South China | ↔ | Qiaozhong | |
| 20 | Lingtang Huancun Lu | ↔ | Chigang Datang | |
| 21 | Jiefang Beilu (Yingyuan Lu Entrance) | ↔ | Pingsha Village (Pingsha Park) | |
| 24 | Yuntai Garden | ↔ | Dunhe Lu | |
| 25 | Changgang Lu | ↔ | Datansha (Guangzhou No.1 Middle School) | |
| 27 | Guangwei Lu | ↔ | Dongguanzhuang | |
| 28 | Tianpingjia | ↔ | Longdong (Longyi Villas) | |
| 29 | Guangzhou Paper Mill | ↔ | Zhannan Lu | |
| 30 | Longdong (Guangdong University of Finance) | ↔ | Guangzhou railway station (Caonuan Park) | |
| 31 | Jiefang Beilu (Yingyuan Lu Entrance) | ↔ | Nanshi West | |
| 32 | South China University of Technology | ↔ | Huangshi Lu | |
| 34 | Yunxiao Lu (Gate 5 Mall) | ↔ | Guocun | |
| 35 | Wende Lu | ↔ | HEMC (Guangdong Science Center) | |
| 36 | Huangshi Lu | ↔ | Zhujiang Swimming Pool | |
| 37 | Dongshankou | ↔ | Chisha (Guangdong University of Finance & Economics) | |
| 38 | Times Rose Garden | ↔ | Nanfang Building (Cultural Park) | |
| 39 | Tianhe Bus Terminal | ↔ | Longdong (Guangdong University of Finance) | |
| 40 | Dongshan (Shuqian Lu) | ↔ | Guangdan Garden | |
| 41 | Guangzhou East railway station | ↔ | Huijing Beilu | |
| Guangzhou 42 | (GZ) Wende Lu | ↔ | (FS) Baisha (Zhonghai Jinshawan) | |
| 43 | Guangzhou East railway station | ↔ | Huangpu Port | |
| 44 | Zhujiang Hospital | ↔ | Chebei | |
| 45 | Xiaozhou | ↔ | Guangzhou East railway station | |
| 46 | Luochongwei (Songnan Lu) | ↔ | Institute of Chemistry, CAS | |
| 51 | Tianpingjia | ↔ | Wanbo Center | |
| 51A | Tianpingjia | ↔ | Lijiao | |
| 52 | Guangzhou railway station (Caonuan Park) | ↔ | Dongsha Industrial Park | |
| 53 | Yangtao Park (Mayland Lake) | ↔ | Baogang Dadao | |
| 54 | Donghua Nanlu (End of Jiangwan Bridge) | ↔ | Institute of Chemistry, CAS | |
| 55 | Jinshazhou (Taole Jie) | ↔ | Qiaodong Residential Community | |
| 56 | Guangta Lu | ↔ | Baiyunshan Pharmaceutical Factory | |
| 57 | Ersha Island West | ↔ | Jiaokou Coach Terminal | |
| 58 | The 1st Affiliated Hospital of Guangzhou Medical University (Jinghai Lu) | ↔ | Times Rose Garden | |
| 58A | Jiefang Beilu (Yingyuan Lu Entrance) | ↔ | Tangge Village | |
| 59 | Baiyun Lu | ↔ | Lijiao | |
| 60 | Jichang Lu | ↔ | Olympic Sports Center | |
| 61 | Haiyin Bridge | ↔ | Jiaokou Coach Terminal | |
| 62 | Xingmin Lu (igc Mall) | ↔ | Shicha Lu (Jinbi Xincheng) | |
| 63 | Shicha Lu (Jinbi Xincheng) | ↔ | Jincheng Garden (Dongfengdong) | |
| 64 | Guangwei Lu | ↔ | Dongsha Industrial Park | |
| 65 | Leyiju Garden | ↔ | Baogang Dadao | |
| 66 | Pantang | ↔ | Dongping | |
| 66 Regular Route | Pantang | ↔ | Shihu Troop | |
| 69 | Fenshui Residential Area | ↔ | Chigang Datang | |
| 70 | Fangcun Garden | ↔ | Houjiao | |
| 71 | FangcunXilang | ↔ | Xiwan Lu (Tangning Garden) | |
| 72 | Tianjian Plaza | ↔ | Guangzhou Zoo | |
| 74 | Guangzhou Zoo | ↔ | Fangcun Garden | |
| 75 | Qiaocheng Garden | ↔ | Fangxin Lu (Guocun Residential Area) | |
| 76 | Jixianyuan Teachers' Village | ↔ | Dongshan | |
| 76A | Longgui Yongxingcun | ↔ | Peasant Movement Institute | |
| 78 | Dongshan Plaza | ↔ | Cencun | |
| 78A | Tianhebei | ↔ | Tianhe Intelligence City Core Area (Gaotang) | |
| 79 | Dexing Lu (Shangxiajiu Pedestrian Street) | ↔ | Luoxi Xincheng (H&H Fishermen's Wharf) | |
| 80 | Pleasant View Garden | ↔ | Tongdewei (Jindeyuan) | |
| Guangzhou 81 | (GZ) Cultural Park | ↔ | (FS) Peninsula Garden | |
| 82 | Haizhu Coach Terminal | ↔ | Fangcun Dadaoxi (Jiaokou Coach Terminal) | |
| 83 | Baiyunshan Pharmaceutical Factory | ↔ | Guangshan Lu (Wanlong Lu) | |
| 84 | Guangzhou Zoo | ↔ | Yushatan (Wanggang Village) | |
| 84A | Guangzhou Zoo | ↔ | Yushatan (Yuzhong Lu) | |
| 85 | Fangcun Dadaoxi (Jiaokou Coach Terminal) | ↔ | Tianpingjia | |
| 86 | Yidexi | ↔ | HEMC Guangzhou University of Chinese Medicine | |
| 87 | Jichang Lu | ↔ | Pleasant View Garden | |
| 88 | Xichang | ↔ | Lijiao Luxi | |
| 89 | Dashatou | ↔ | Tianhe Coach Terminal | |
| 90 | Wuyang New Town | ↔ | Shaxi Dadao East | |
| 91 | Zhuguang Lu | ↔ | Fangcun Tea Market | |
| 93 | Jingtaikeng | ↔ | Chigang | |

=== 100–199 ===
| Route | Terminal | | | Notes |
|---|---|---|---|---|
| 101 Trolleybus | Jichang Lu | ↔ | Haiyin Bridge | |
| 102 Trolleybus | Cultural Park | ↔ | Dongshan | |
| 103 Trolleybus | Jichang Lu | ↔ | Jichang Lu | |
| 104 Trolleybus | Zhongshan Balu | ↔ | Haiyin Bridge | |
| 105 Trolleybus | Tang'an Lu | ↔ | Huangsha | |
| 106 Trolleybus | Chajiao Lu | ↔ | Jincheng Garden (Dongfengdong) | |
| 107 Trolleybus | Zhongshan Balu | ↔ | Huacheng Lu (G.T. Land Plaza) | |
| 108 Trolleybus | Nanyue Huayuan | ↔ | Dongshan | |
| 109 Trolleybus | Cultural Park | ↔ | Tianpingjia | |
| 110 Trolleybus | Cultural Park | ↔ | Tianpingjia | |
| 111 Trolleybus | Huangshi Lu | ↺ | Huangshi Lu | One-way loop route. |
| 112 Trolleybus | Tianpingjia | ↔ | Nantian Lu | |
| 113 Trolleybus | Tang'an Lu | ↔ | Nantian Lu | |
| 114 Trolleybus | Luochongwei (Songnan Lu) | ↔ | Nantian Lu | |
| 121 | Xilang Community | ↔ | Regal Riviera | |
| 121A | Fanghe Garden | ↔ | Regal Riviera | |
| 122 | Guangzhou East railway station | ↔ | Riverside Garden | |
| Guangzhou 123 | (GZ) Gexin Lu (Everbright Garden) | ↔ | (FS) Peninsula Garden | |
| 124 | Jiaokou Coach Terminal | ↔ | Yunyuan Xincun | |
| 125 | Garden Hotel | ↔ | Riverside Garden | |
| 126 | Huanggang | ↔ | Tianhe Coach Terminal | |
| 127 | Guangzhou Zoo | ↔ | Junhe Industrial Zone (Qinghu Village) | |
| 128 | Haiyin Bridge | ↔ | Zhudao Garden | |
| 129 | Jincheng Garden (Dongfengdong) | ↔ | Nanguo Olympic Garden | |
| 130 | Chigang Datang | ↔ | Huajing New Town | |
| 131A/131B | Chigang | ↺ | Chigang | Loop route. |
| Guangzhou 132 | (FS) White Swan Garden | ↺ | (FS) White Swan Garden | |
| 133 | Longkouxi (Suiyuan Residential Area) | ↔ | Ruyifang | |
| 134 | Zede Garden (Guangzhou Hospital of TCM Tongdewei Branch) | ↔ | Yidexi | |
| 136 | Tianhe Bus Terminal | ↔ | Yunjing Garden West Entrance | |
| 137 | Guangzhou Zoo South Entrance | ↔ | Xinzhou | |
| 138 | Wuyang New Town | ↔ | Dongguanzhuang | |
| 140 | Yuancun | ↔ | Yuangang (Yuanyang Tianjiao) | |
| 175 | Tongdewei (Sunshine Garden) | ↔ | Guangzhou East railway station | |
| 176 | Huangsha | ↔ | Tongdewei (Sunshine Garden) | |
| 179 | Baiyunshan Pharmaceutical Factory | ↔ | Shangbu | |
| 180 | Jiefang Beilu (Yingyuan Lu Entrance) | ↔ | Lijiao (Zhujiang Yujingwan) | |
| 181 | Keziling (Hetian Lu) | ↔ | Fangcun Coach Terminal | |
| 182 | Pleasant View Garden | ↔ | Yunyuan Xincun | |
| 183 | Guangzhou East railway station | ↔ | Fenshui Residential Area | |
| 184 | Hengzhigang (Cancer Center of Guangzhou Medical University) | ↔ | Datang | |
| 185 | Guangzhou East railway station | ↔ | Zede Garden (Guangzhou Hospital of TCM Tongdewei Branch) | |
| 186 | Guangyuan Xincun | ↔ | Zhujiang Hospital | |
| 188 | Dajitou (Puppet Arts Theater) | ↔ | Lijiao (Zhenxing Dajie) | |
| 189 | Yaotai (Beauty Exchange Center) | ↔ | Shiliugang (Haizhu Government Service Center) | |
| 190 | Hetianxi | ↔ | Datang | |
| 191 | Huajing New Town | ↔ | Red Cross Hospital North Entrance | |
| 192 | Shuiyin Lu | ↔ | Zhujiang Hospital | |
| 193 | Guangwei Lu | ↔ | Fenshui Residential Area | |
| 194 | Huajing New Town | ↔ | Haizhu Square (Qiaoguangxi) | |
| 195 | Lijiao (Zhujiang Yujingwan) | ↔ | Guangzhou East railway station | |
| 196 | Pantang | ↔ | Tongdewei (Hengjiao Village) | |
| 197 | Changgang Lu | ↔ | Huijing Beilu | |
| 198A/198B | Tancun | ↺ | Tancun | Loop route. |
| 199 | Shuiyin Lu | ↔ | Qifu Lu | |

=== 200–299 ===
| Route | Terminal | | | Notes |
|---|---|---|---|---|
| 201 | Guangzhou railway station (Caonuan Park) | ↔ | Xiniujiao Village | |
| 204 | Tanwei (Baiyuewan) | ↔ | Regal Riviera | |
| Guangzhou 205 | (GZ) Kangwang Lu (Shangxiajiu) | ↔ | (FS) Baisha (Zhonghai Jinshawan) | |
| 206 | Jiaokou Coach Terminal | ↔ | Xinjiao Donglu (Chisha Market) | |
| 207 | Hengbao Plaza | ↔ | Guangzhou Flower Expo (Eastern & Western China Poverty Alleviation Collaborative Trading Market) | |
| 208 | Fangcun Dadaoxi (Jiaokou Coach Terminal) | ↔ | Datang West | |
| 209 | Tanwei (Baiyuewan) | ↔ | Guangzhou East railway station | |
| 210 | Guangzhou railway station (Caonuan Park) | ↔ | Nangang (Guangzhou International Toy Center) | |
| 211 | Guangzhou railway station (Caonuan Park) | ↔ | Nanpu Island (Fairview Peninsula) | |
| 212 | Xicun (Water Plant) | ↔ | Yagang | |
| 214 | Guangzhou East railway station | ↔ | Xintang | |
| 215 | Tongdewei (Teachers' Village) | ↔ | Dongshan (Guigang) | |
| 215 Long Route | Tongdewei (Likangju) | ↔ | Dongshan (Guigang) | |
| 217 | Guangwei Lu | ↔ | Fangcun Xilang | |
| 218 | Yangtao Park (Mayland Lake) | ↔ | Institute of Chemistry, CAS | |
| 219 | Baiyunshan Pharmaceutical Factory | ↔ | Huangsha | |
| 220 | Guangzhou Zoo | ↔ | Nanji Lu | |
| 221 | Guangzhou Zoo South Entrance | ↔ | Lijiao | |
| 222 | Fangcun Fengnian Lu (Wong Tai Sin Temple) | ↔ | Wuyang New Town | |
| 223 | Baiyun Garden | ↔ | Baiyun Lu | |
| 225 | Locomotive Depot | ↔ | Binjiang Donglu | |
| 226 | Hengbao Plaza | ↔ | Datang (Jianzhen Garden) | |
| 228 | Guangzhou Coach Terminal | ↔ | Shijing Qingfeng | |
| 229 | Luochongwei (Songnan Lu) | ↔ | Pazhou Shijicun (Huangpu Ancient Port) | |
| 230 | Zhichang Hengmalu | ↔ | South China University of Technology | |
| Guangzhou 231 | Guangzhou Coach Terminal | ↔ | (FS) Heshun Coach Terminal | |
| 233 | Guangzhou East railway station | ↔ | Jiaokou Coach Terminal | |
| 236 | Jiaokou Coach Terminal | ↔ | Tianhe Coach Terminal | |
| 238 | Nanfang Building (Cultural Park) | ↔ | Shijing Tancun | |
| 239 | Nanzhou Beilu | ↔ | Huajing New Town (Hanjing Lu) | |
| 241 | Tongdewei (Likangju) | ↔ | Jinhuyayuan | |
| 243 | Gexin Lu (Everbright Garden) | ↔ | Yuancun (Mayland Garden) | |
| 244 | Huangshidong (Baiyun Shangcheng) | ↔ | Jiangnan Dadaonan | |
| 244A | Huiqiao Xincheng | ↔ | Jiangnan Dadaonan | |
| 245 | Huangshidong (Baiyun Shangcheng) | ↔ | Yuancun Yihenglu | |
| 246 | Guangzhou Zoo | ↔ | Taihe (Fengtai Henglu) | |
| 247 | Hengfu Lu | ↔ | Nanzhou Beilu | |
| 250 | Pantang | ↔ | Shiliugang | |
| 251 | Huangsha | ↔ | Qixinggang (Guangdong Bureau of Coal Geology) | |
| 252 | Tianhe Coach Terminal | ↔ | Waihuan Xilu (Beiting Plaza) | |
| 253 | Luochongwei (Songnan Lu) | ↔ | Ruibaoxiang | |
| 254 | Guangzhou railway station (Caonuan Park) | ↔ | Shijing Hongxing Village | |
| 256 | Guangzhou East railway station | ↔ | Zhudao Garden | |
| 257 | Guangzhou railway station (Caonuan Park) | ↔ | Tianhe Coach Terminal | |
| 259 | Jiahe Changban | ↔ | Luochongwei (Songnan Lu) | |
| Guangzhou 260 | (GZ) Zhannan Lu | ↔ | (FS) Suiyan Lu (Majestic Garden) | |
| Guangzhou 260A | (GZ) Jiaokou Coach Terminal | ↺ | (GZ) Jiaokou Coach Terminal | One-way loop route. Via Nanhai District, Foshan. |
| 261 | Hesha | ↔ | Yuzhu | |
| 262 | Regal Riviera | ↔ | Xinzhou Wharf | |
| 263 | Guangzhou East railway station | ↔ | Yingfeng Lu | |
| 264 | Luntou | ↔ | Guangren Lu | |
| 264A | Luntou | ↔ | Zhujiang Film Studio | |
| 265 | Guangwei Lu | ↔ | Huanjiao Village | |
| 266 | Zhujiang Swimming Pool | ↔ | Huijing Beilu | |
| 268 | Chen Clan Academy (Zhongshan Qilu) | ↔ | Baiyun Garden | |
| 270 | Tuhua | ↔ | Pantang | |
| 271 | Guangzhou Children's Park | ↔ | Jiaoxin Village | |
| 273 | Keziling (Hetian Lu) | ↔ | Xiaogangwan | |
| 274 | R&F Peach Garden (Zengbu Village) | ↔ | Qide Lu (Guangdong Work Injury Rehabilitation Hospital) | |
| Guangzhou 275 | (GZ) Jiefang Beilu (Yingyuan Lu Entrance) | ↔ | (FS) Pingzhou (Fufeng Junyu) | |
| Guangzhou 275A | (GZ) Jiefang Beilu (Yingyuan Lu Entrance) | ↔ | (FS) Poly Seattle | |
| Guangzhou 276 | (GZ) Nanzhou Beilu (Hotsun Plaza) | ↔ | (FS) Vanke Wonderland | |
| Guangzhou 277 | (GZ) Xilang Community | ↔ | (FS) Shamian Xincheng | |
| 278 | Xingmin Lu (igc Mall) | ↔ | Huiqiao Xincheng | |
| 280 | Guangzhou East railway station | ↔ | Huanggang (Jindong Fashion Market) | |
| Guangzhou 281 | (GZ) Guangwei Lu | ↔ | (FS) Greenland Xiangshuhuacheng | |
| Guangzhou 283 | (GZ) Guangzhou East railway station | ↔ | (FS) Vanke Wonderland | |
| Guangzhou 283 Regular Route | (GZ) Xiancun | ↔ | (FS) Baisha (Zhonghai Jinshawan) | |
| 284 | Yuancun (Juanmachang) | ↔ | Guangyuan Xincun | |
| 285 | Huadi Dadaonan (Egongcun) | ↔ | Yuntai Garden | |
| Guangzhou 286 | (GZ) Guangwei Lu | ↔ | (FS) Huangqi Diyicheng | |
| 287 | Guangzhou Zoo South Entrance | ↔ | Haizhu Coach Terminal | |
| 288 | Clifford Estates | ↔ | Xihua Lu End | |
| 288A | Guangzhou South Railway Station | ↔ | Xihua Lu End | |
| 290 | Jinshazhou (Taole Jie) | ↔ | Tianhe Coach Terminal | |
| 293 | Guangwei Lu | ↔ | Huajing Xincheng | |
| 297 | Huangsha | ↔ | Leyiju Garden | |
| 298 | Xiamao Coach Terminal | ↔ | Huajing Xincheng (Hanjing Lu) | |
| 299 | Yuancun (Juanmachang) | ↔ | Changgang Lu | |

=== 300–399 ===
| Route | Terminal | | | Notes |
|---|---|---|---|---|
| 301 | Haizhu Coach Terminal | ↔ | Bangyan Lu Bus Terminal | |
| 301A | Zhanqian Lu (Xijiao Building) | ↔ | Guangzhou South Railway Station | |
| 302 | Guangzhou East railway station | ↔ | Shiqiao Coach Terminal | |
| 302A | Guangzhou East railway station | ↔ | Agile Cambridgeshire | |
| 303 | Taigucang Lu | ↔ | Shiqiao Coach Terminal | |
| 303A | Tianhe Coach Terminal | ↔ | Guangzhou South Railway Station | |
| 304 | Tangxia Residential Area | ↔ | Chimelong Tourist Resort | |
| 305 | Luochongwei (Songnan Lu) | ↔ | Guangzhou Country Garden | |
| 305 Branch Route | Nanpu Island (Fairview Peninsula) | AM→ | Luochongwei (Songnan Lu) | |
| 309 | Jiaokou Coach Terminal | ↔ | Dashi Metro Station | |
| Guangzhou 309A | (GZ) Jiaokou Coach Terminal | ↔ | Guangzhou South Railway Station | Via Nanhai District, Foshan. |
| 311 | Nanpu Island (Fairview Peninsula) | ↔ | Tianhe Bus Terminal | |
| 312 | Jiaokou Coach Terminal | ↔ | Clifford Estates | |
| 320 | Tianhe Intelligence City Core Area (Gaotang) | ↔ | Dashadong (Guangzhou Maritime University) | |
| 321 | Nangang Bus Terminal | ↔ | Guangzhou Science City (Tiantai Erlu) | |
| 322 | Kaifa Dadao Interchange East | ↔ | Cangtou Village | |
| 323 | Baoli Aitecheng | ↔ | Huangpu Sports Center | |
| 324 | Liahe (Huilian Lu) | ↔ | Huangpu Sports Center | |
| 325 | Guangshan Lu (Wanlong Lu) | ↔ | Olympic Sports Center | |
| 326 | Huangpu Port | ↔ | Guangzhou Science City (Tiantai Erlu) | |
| 327 | Lingtou | ↔ | Luogang Xiangxue (Plum Blossom World) | |
| 327A | Lingtou | ↔ | Kecheng Villa | |
| 328 | Fengle Nanlu | ↔ | Dashadong (Guangzhou Maritime University) | |
| 329 | Fengle Nanlu | ↔ | Yuzhu Metro Station | |
| 330 | Shuixi Lu | ↔ | Vanke Lixiangjia | |
| 331 | Shuinancun (Culture & Sports Center) | ↔ | Canglian | |
| 332 | Changjiang Lu (Guangdong No.2 Workers' Hospital) | ↔ | HEMC Coach Center | |
| 333 | Luogang Xiangxue (Plum Blossom World) | ↔ | Daguan Lubei (Daguan Wetland Park) | |
| 333A | Lianhe (Huilian Lu) | ↔ | Tianlu Lake Nursing Centers for the Elderly | |
| 334 | Luogang Wanda Plaza | ↔ | Nangang (International Toys and Gifts Center) | |
| 335 | Guangzhou Science City Caipin Lu | ↔ | Yunpu Yilu (Zhongyi Pharmaceutical Factory) | |
| 336 | Daguan Lubei (Daguan Wetland Park) | ↔ | Glory City | |
| 337 | Luogang Xiangxue (Plum Blossom World) | ↔ | Bicun (Dongqu Primary School) | |
| 338 | Glory City | ↔ | Huangpu Port | |
| 339 | Luogang Xiangxue (Plum Blossom World) | ↔ | Yuzhu Metro Station | |
| 340 | Bicun (Dongqu Primary School) | ↔ | Yunpu Yilu (Zhongyi Pharmaceutical Factory) | |
| 341 | Chunfen Lu | ↔ | Huafeng Temple | |
| 342 | Jiulong Town Government | ↔ | Liantang Village | |
| 343 | Tangshang Lu | ↔ | Fengwei Village (Shishe) | |
| 343A | Changgeng Village | ↺ | Changgeng Village | One-way loop route. |
| 344 | Yushu Xincun | ↔ | Fengle Nanlu | |
| 345 | Jiulong Town Government | ↔ | Tianhe Coach Terminal | |
| 345A | Yongshun Dadao (Guangzhou Cadre Sanatorium) | ↔ | Tianhe Coach Terminal | |
| 346 | Suifeng Village | ↔ | Changfu Lu (Tianhe Coach Terminal) | |
| 347 | Olympic Sports Center | ↔ | Yunpu Yilu (Zhongyi Pharmaceutical Factory) | |
| 348 | Olympic Sports Center | ↔ | Fengle Nanlu | |
| 349 | Guangshan Lu (Wanlong Lu) | ↔ | Baoli Aitecheng | |
| 350 | Jiulong Town Government | ↔ | Hulong Village | |
| 351 | Jiulong Town Government | ↺ | Jiulong Town Government | One-way loop route. |
| 352 | Jiulong Town Government | ↔ | Jingxia Village (Gaotianchang) | |
| 352A | Sino-Singapore Guangzhou Knowledge City South (Hetangxia Metro Station) | ↔ | Yangjing Village (Cultural & Entertainment Square) | |
| 353 | Guanzhou Metro Station | ↺ | Guanzhou Metro Station | One-way loop route. |
| 354 | Changping Metro Station | ↔ | Suifengcun (Tianhe College of Guangdong Polytechnic Normal University) | |
| 355 | Tianhe Intelligence City Core Area (Gaotang) | ↔ | Huangpu Sports Center | |
| 356 | Huangpu Sports Center | ↔ | Huicai Lu | |
| 357 | Hulin Ludong | ↔ | Huangpu Sports Center | |
| 358 | International Fields on Hills Garden | ↔ | Luogang Center | |
| 359 | Luogang Wanda Plaza | ↺ | Luogang Wanda Plaza | One-way loop route. |
| 360 | Wenchong Metro Station | ↔ | Bigang Xincun | |
| 361 | Tuhua | ↔ | Huangchuan Cultural Center | |
| 361A | HEMC Guangdong Provincial Hospital of TCM | ↔ | Siting Lu (Huangpu Shipyard) | Weekdays only. |
| 362 | Jiulong Town Government | ↔ | Shangluo Village | |
| 363 | Bonded Area (Liquor Expo) | ↺ | Bonded Area (Liquor Expo) | One-way loop route. |
| 364 | Daguan Lubei (Daguan Wetland Park) | ↔ | Huangpu Sports Center | |
| 365 | Jiulong Town Government | ↔ | Luogang Center | |
| 365A | Xiangxue Metro Station | ↔ | Zhenlong Metro Station | |
| 366 | Shuixi Lu | ↔ | Yuzhu Wharf | |
| 367 | Huocun East | ↔ | Glory City | |
| Guangzhou 368 | (GZ) Xiayuan | ↔ | Xinhua College of Sun Yat-sen University (Dongguan Campus) | |
| Guangzhou 369 | (GZ) Dashadi Metro Station | ↔ | Xinhua College of Sun Yat-sen University (Dongguan Campus) | |
| 370 | Jiulong Town Government | ↔ | Zhucun Coach Terminal | |
| 371 | Guangzhou Science City Caipin Lu | ↔ | KWG Summit Bus Terminal | |
| 371A | Guangzhou Science City Caipin Lu | ↔ | GZ Lakes | |
| 372 | Xintang Shengshimingmen | ↔ | Xiayuan | |
| 373 | Luogang Jie | ↔ | Yonghe (Chonghe Garden)) | |
| 374 | Huangpu Sports Center | ↔ | Hushan Guoji | |
| 375 | Guangzhou Science City (Tiantai Erlu) | ↔ | Phoenix City Fengxinyuan | |
| 380A/380B | HEMC (Guangzhou University of Chinese Medicine) | ↺ | HEMC (Guangzhou University of Chinese Medicine) | One-way loop route. |
| 383 | HEMC Guangdong Science Center | ↔ | Changzhou Wharf | |
| 384 | HEMC Nanting Village | ↔ | Lingnan Impression | |
| 387 | HEMC Nanting Village | ↔ | HEMC (Suishi Village) | |
| 388 | Guangzhou Science City South Bus Terminal | ↔ | Nangang (International Toys and Gifts Center) | |
| 389 | Huangpu Sports Center | ↔ | Nangang Bus Terminal | |
| 390 | Huakeng Ecological Village | ↔ | Guangzhou Science City South Bus Terminal | |
| 391 | Lianhe (Huilian Lu) | ↔ | Glory City | |
| 392 | Luogang Xiangxue (Plum Blossom World) | ↔ | Huangdeng Village | |
| 393 | Luogang Center | ↔ | Nangang (International Toys and Gifts Center) | |
| 394 | Yonghe Xianjiang | ↺ | Yonghe Xianjiang | One-way loop route. |
| 395 | Luogang Xiangxue (Plum Blossom World) | ↔ | Guangzhou Science City South Bus Terminal | |
| 396 | Lingtou | ↔ | Guangzhou Science City Caipin Lu | |
| 396A | Yongshun Dadao (Guangzhou Cadre Sanatorium) | ↺ | Yongshun Dadao (Guangzhou Cadre Sanatorium) | Weekdays only. One-way loop route. |
| 397 | Luogang Xiangxue (Plum Blossom World) | ↔ | Danshuikeng Scenic Area | |

=== 400–499 ===
| Route | Terminal | | | Notes |
|---|---|---|---|---|
| 400 | Leyiju Garden | ↔ | Dongguanzhuang | |
| 401 | Yuancun Tongle Garden | ↺ | Yuancun Tongle Garden | One-way loop route. |
| 402 | Dongpu Damalu | ↔ | Sanxi Metro Station | |
| 403 | Dalingang | ↔ | Olympic Sports Center | |
| 404 | Huangcun North | ↔ | Dongpu Metro Station | |
| 405 | Loteam Creative Park | ↺ | Loteam Creative Park | One-way loop route. |
| 406 | Suiyuan Residential Area | ↺ | Suiyuan Residential Area | One-way loop route. |
| 407 | Zhujiang New Town | ↺ | Zhujiang New Town | One-way loop route. |
| 408 | Guangdan Garden | ↺ | Guangdan Garden | One-way loop route. |
| 408A | Guangdan Garden | ↺ | Guangdan Garden | One-way loop route. |
| 410 | Hedong | ↺ | Hedong | One-way loop route. |
| 411 | Fangxin Lu (Guocun Residential Area) | ↔ | Fanghe Garden | |
| Guangzhou 412 | (GZ) Carnation Garden | ↔ | (FS) Shazaiwei (Zhonghai Jincheng) | |
| 413 | Zhongshan Balu | ↔ | Chen Clan Academy (Zhongshan Qilu) | |
| 414 | Fangcun Kuipeng | ↔ | Fangcun Hexingyuan | |
| 415 | Getang Street | ↺ | Getang Street | One-way loop route. |
| 416 | Tanwei | ↺ | Tanwei | One-way loop route. |
| 417 | Shaluo Village | ↔ | Jinyu Garden | |
| Guangzhou 419 | (GZ) Jiaokou Coach Terminal | ↔ | (GZ) Fangcun Coach Terminal | Via Nanhai District, Foshan. |
| 420 | Qifu Lu | ↺ | Qifu Lu | One-way loop route. |
| 421 | Nanhang Xincun | ↔ | Baiyun Culture Square | |
| 422 | Xinshixu | ↔ | Nanhang Xincun | |
| 423 | Junhe Dadaodong | ↺ | Junhe Dadaodong | One-way loop route. |
| Guangzhou 424 | (GZ) Yongtai Xincun | ↔ | (FS) Baisha (Zhonghai Jinshawan) | |
| 425 | Jixianyuan | ↔ | Shijing (Institute of Railway Technology) | |
| 426 | Huiqiao Nanlu | ↔ | Xiaoping Village Committee | |
| 427 | Longgui (Yuanxia Village) | ↔ | Longguicheng (Longgui Metro Station) | |
| Guangzhou 429 | Jinshazhou (Taole Jie) | ↺ | Jinshazhou (Taole Jie) | One-way loop route. |
| 430 | Huangpu Military Academy | ↔ | Shenjing Wharf | |
| 431 | Yuzhu Wharf | ↔ | Hulin Ludong | |
| 432 | Huangpu Sports Center | ↺ | Huangpu Sports Center | One-way loop route. |
| 433 | Huangpu Sports Center | ↔ | Jitang Commercial Street | |
| 434 | Huakeng Ecological Village | ↺ | Huakeng Ecological Village | One-way loop route. |
| 435 | Lubu Coast Guard Base | ↔ | Xiayuan | |
| 436 | Nangang Bus Terminal | ↺ | Nangang Bus Terminal | One-way loop route. |
| 437 | International Fields on Hills Garden | ↔ | Nangang Bus Terminal | |
| 438 | Lixiang Lu | ↔ | Bishan Village | |
| 439 | Nangang Bus Terminal | ↔ | Yunpu Yilu (Zhongyi Pharmaceutical Factory) | |
| 440 | Xiji | ↔ | Jinbi Lu | |
| 441 | Zhenlong | ↺ | Zhenlong | One-way loop route. |
| 442 | Zhenlong | ↔ | Shilongtou | |
| 443 | Zhenlong | ↔ | Fushan Village Committee | |
| 444 | Zhenlong | ↔ | Longjiang Village | |
| 446 | Changping Village | ↔ | Yonghe (Chonghe Garden) | |
| 447 | Xiqu Bus Terminal | ↔ | Bicun | |
| 448 | Olympic Sports Center | ↔ | Kelin Lu | |
| 449 | Badou Village (Public Service Station of Tianluhu Community) | ↔ | Huangbei Community | |
| 449 Regular Route | Lianhe (Huilian Lu) | ↔ | Lingtou | |
| 450 | Nangang Bus Terminal | ↔ | Xiaolang | |
| 451 | Yuanbei Village | ↔ | Luogang Xiangxue (Plum Blossom World) | |
| 452 | Lianhe | ↔ | Guangzhou Science City Caipin Lu | |
| 453 | Xiqu Bus Terminal | ↺ | Xiqu Bus Terminal | One-way loop route. |
| 453A | Yanhe Lu (Yijia Apartment) | ↺ | Yanhe Lu (Yijia Apartment) | One-way loop route. |
| 454 | Bicun | ↺ | Bicun | One-way loop route. |
| 455 | Yonghe Xianjiang | ↺ | Yonghe Xianjiang | One-way loop route. |
| 456 | Jiulong Town Government | ↔ | Changgeng Village | |
| 457 | Jiulong Town Government | ↔ | Xiezhuang Village | |
| 458 | Zhenlong | ↔ | Jingtou 9th Community | |
| 459 | Huocun East | ↔ | Dashadi Metro Station | |
| 460 | The Memorial Museum of the Generalissimo Sun Yat-sen's Mansion | ↺ | The Memorial Museum of the Generalissimo Sun Yat-sen's Mansion | One-way loop route. |
| 460A | The Memorial Museum of the Generalissimo Sun Yat-sen's Mansion | ↺ | The Memorial Museum of the Generalissimo Sun Yat-sen's Mansion | One-way loop route. |
| 461 | Pazhou | ↔ | Beishan | |
| 461 Regular Route | Pazhou | ↔ | Luntou Village | |
| 462 | Qiaocheng Garden | ↔ | Yijing Xilu (Zhujiang Light Textile City) | |
| 463 | Dunhe Lu | ↺ | Dunhe Lu | One-way loop route. |
| 464 | Chigang Datang | ↔ | Dunhe Lu | |
| 466 | Houjiao Dajie | ↔ | Dongxiaonan Metro Station | |
| 467 | Chisha (Guangdong University of Finance & Economics) | ↔ | Nanfenghui (Xingangdong Metro Station) | |
| 468 | Haiqinwan (Xiadu Lu) | ↔ | Tuhua | |
| 469 | Guangzhou Paper Mill | ↔ | Jiangtai Lu Metro Station | |
| 470 | Jichang Interchange (The 1st Affiliated Hospital of Guangzhou University of Chinese Medicine) | ↺ | Jichang Interchange (The 1st Affiliated Hospital of Guangzhou University of Chinese Medicine) | One-way loop route. |
| 471 | Zhendong Lu | ↔ | Caozhuang Village | |
| 472 | Shenshan | ↔ | Daling Village | |
| 473 | Wuxi Village | ↔ | Liaocai (Shiwaitaoyuan) | |
| 474 | Jianggao (Xiahe Lu) | ↔ | Changgangcun | |
| 475 | Gangbei Lu | ↔ | Sanyuanli Metro Station (Exit C2) | |
| 476 | Jiaoxin Village | ↔ | Huanggang | |
| 477 | Xizhou Beilu End | ↺ | Xizhou Beilu End | One-way loop route. |
| Guangzhou 478 | (GZ) R&F West Garden (Xicun) | ↔ | (FS) Baisha | |
| 479 | Jingtai Zhijie | ↔ | Feixiang Park Metro Station | |
| 480 | Guangzhou North Railway Station | ↺ | Guangzhou North Railway Station | One-way loop route. |
| 481 | Guangzhou University (Guihuagang Campus) | ↺ | Guangzhou University (Guihuagang Campus) | One-way loop route. |
| 482 | Guangzhou Zoo | ↺ | Guangzhou Zoo | One-way loop route. |
| 483 | Taojin Beilu | ↺ | Taojin Beilu | One-way loop route. |
| Guangzhou 485 | (GZ) Hedong | ↔ | (FS) Sanshan CITC | |
| 486 | Locomotive Depot | ↔ | Xicun | |
| 487 | Dongjiao Teachers' Village | ↔ | Fenghuanggang | |
| 488 | Yijing Xilu (Zhujiang Light Textile City) | ↺ | Yijing Xilu (Zhujiang Light Textile City) | One-way loop route. |
| 489 | Taigucang Lu | ↔ | Jiangnan Xilu | |
| 490 | Olympic Sports Center | ↺ | Olympic Sports Center | One-way loop route. |
| 491 | Yushatan (Yuzhong Lu) | ↔ | Tianhe Intelligence City Core Area (Gaotang) | |
| 492 | Longdong Metro Station (Forestry Vocational and Technical School of Guangdong) | ↔ | Yushatan (Zhongshan Village) | |
| 492A | Longdong Metro Station (Forestry Vocational and Technical School of Guangdong) | → | Yushatan (Zhongshan Village) | |
| 492 Regular Route | Longdong Torii | ↔ | Yinglong Lu (Longyi Villas) | |
| 493 | Longdong Torii | ↺ | Longdong Torii | One-way loop route. |
| 494 | Tianhe Coach Terminal | ↔ | Guangzhou Science City (Tiantai Erlu) | |
| 494A | Tianhe Coach Terminal | ↔ | Guangzhou Science City South Bus Terminal | |
| 495 | Yushu Xincun | ↔ | Chebeinan Metro Station | |
| 496 | Guangzhou Science City (Tiantai Erlu) | ↔ | Keyun Lu | |
| 497 | Huangcun | ↔ | Yushatan (Yudong Lu) | |
| 498 | Huijing Beilu | ↔ | Meiyuan Lu | |
| 499 | Huacheng Lu (G.T. Land Plaza) | ↺ | Huacheng Lu (G.T. Land Plaza) | One-way loop route. |

=== 500–599 ===
| Route | Terminal | | | Notes |
|---|---|---|---|---|
| 502 | Baiyun Lu | ↔ | Nanhu (Big Hippo Water World) | |
| 502 Regular Route | Baiyun Lu | ↔ | Shatian Village | |
| 503 | Yangtao Park (Mayland Lake) | ↔ | Tianhe Coach Terminal | |
| 504 | Yuancun Yihenglu | ↔ | Taihe (Shatinggang Village) | |
| 506 | Tianhe Bus Terminal | ↔ | Yonghe (Vanke Lixiangjia) | |
| 508 | Guangzhou East railway station | ↔ | Luogang Center | |
| 509 | Yongtai Coach Terminal | ↔ | Jianggao Nangang Village | |
| 510 | Jichang Lu | ↔ | Renhe | |
| 511 | Jichang Lu | ↔ | Shenshan | |
| 511 Regular Route | Jichang Lu | ↔ | Shenshan Dadaoxi | |
| 516 | Bonded Area (Liquor Expo) | ↔ | Yonghe (Vanke Lixiangjia) | |
| 517 | Guangren Lu | ↔ | Huangpu Coach Terminal | |
| 518 | Zhanqian Lu (Xijiao Building) | ↔ | Tangxia Residential Area | |
| 519 | Baiyun Lu | ↔ | Shijing Hongxing Village | |
| 521 | Huanggang | ↔ | Shixi | |
| 521 Regular Route | Huanggang (Jindong Fashion Market) | → | Shixi | |
| 522 | Baiyun Culture Square | ↔ | Jianggao (Baiyun Campus of Guangdong Polytechnic Normal University) | |
| 523 | Guangzhou Coach Terminal | ↔ | Jianggao Xiaotang | |
| 523 Express | Guangzhou Coach Terminal | ↔ | Jianggao Xiaotang | Via Guangqing Expressway and Airport Expressway. |
| 523A | Guangzhou Coach Terminal | ↔ | Dalang | |
| 524 | Changhong Village | ↔ | Guangzhou Coach Terminal | |
| 525 | Haizhong Village | ↔ | Fangcun Pengkui (Rongdu Garden) | |
| 527 | Shixi | ↔ | Xiwan Lu (Tangning Garden) | |
| 527 Regular Route | Shixi | ↔ | Guangzhou Electronic Technician College | |
| 528 | Changhong Village | ↔ | Guangwei Lu | |
| 529 | Guangzhou railway station (Caonuan Park) | ↔ | Taihe | |
| 530 | Shachong South | ↔ | Shigang Lu (Greenland Binjianghui) | |
| 534 | Tianpingjia | ↔ | Luogang | |
| 535 | Baiyun Lu | ↔ | Lianhe (Huilian Lu) | |
| 538 | Huiqiao New Town | ↔ | Nanfang Building (Cultural Park) | |
| 539 | Yongtai Coach Terminal | ↔ | Tongdewei (Jindeyuan) | |
| 540 | Yuancun Yihenglu | ↔ | Huangshi Lu | |
| 541 | Huijing New Town East | ↔ | Hengbao Plaza | |
| 542 | Yuancun Yihenglu | ↔ | Ruibaoxiang | |
| 543 | Shijing (Qingfeng Textile and Garment City) | ↔ | Yuexiu Park | |
| 544 | Guangzhou Gymnasium | ↔ | Guangzhou Paper Mill | |
| 545 | Zede Garden (Guangzhou Hospital of TCM Tongdewei Branch) | ↔ | Zhujiang New Town | |
| 546 | Keziling (Hetian Lu) | ↔ | Nanzhou Garden | |
| 547 | Aoti Nanlu (UTOPA) | ↔ | Guangzhou Gymnasium | |
| 548 | Zhujiang Swimming Pool | ↔ | Daguan Lubei (Daguan Wet Land Park) | |
| 550 | Guangzhou railway station (Caonuan Park) | ↔ | Dongpu Zhucun | |
| 551 | Haizhu Coach Terminal | ↔ | Guangzhou East railway station | |
| 552 | Zhannan Lu | ↔ | Fangcun Coach Terminal | |
| 555 | Datansha (Guangzhou No.1 Middls School) | ↔ | Baiyun Culture Square | |
| 556 | Shijing (Qingfeng Textile and Garment City) | ↔ | Fangcun Coach Terminal | |
| 560 | Huajing New Town (Hanjing Lu) | ↔ | Guangzhou Dadaobei (Nanhu Villa) | |
| 562 | Tangxia Residential Area | ↔ | Xiangjiang Safari Park | |
| 563 | Luochongwei | ↔ | Taihe (Private Technology Park) | |
| 564 | Tianhe Coach Terminal | ↔ | Huangpu Village | |
| 564A | Olympic Sports Center | ↔ | Lianhexu | |
| Guangzhou 565 | (GZ) HEMC (Guangdong University of Technology) | ↔ | (FS) Suiyan Lu (Majestic Garden) | |
| 566A | Xiayuan | ↔ | Yonghe (Chonghe Garden) | |
| 567 | Xiqu Bus Terminal | ↔ | Bicun | |
| 569 | Luogang Xiangxue (Plum Blossom World) | ↔ | Yanhe Lu (Yijia Apartment) | |
| 569 Branch Route | Luogang Xiangxue (Plum Blossom World) | ↔ | Eshanshe | |
| 569 Branch Short Route | Luogang Xiangxue (Plum Blossom World) | ↔ | Huangma Community Committee | |
| 571 | Xintang Coach Terminal | ↔ | Huangpu Port | |
| 571A | Xintang (Siwanggang Park) | ↔ | Xiangxue Metro Station | |
| 571B | Xintang (Siwanggang Park) | ↔ | Guangzhou Development Zone (Xingang Port) | |
| 572 | Xiji | ↺ | Xiji | One-way loop route. |
| 573 | Nangang | ↔ | Guangzhou Science City Caipin Lu | |
| 573 Express | Kaichuang Dadao (Vanke City) | ↔ | Xiqu Bus Terminal | |
| 574 | Kaichuang Dadao (Vanke City) | ↔ | Chebei | |
| 575 | Luogang Wanda Plaza | ↔ | Xiqu Bus Terminal | |
| 575A | Luogang Xiangxue (Plum Blossom World) | ↔ | Zhenlong | |
| 578 | Tianhe Intelligence City Core Area (Gaotang) | ↔ | Luogang Xiangxue (Plum Blossom World) | |
| 579 | Yunpu Erlu | ↔ | Kangnan Lubei | |
| 581 | Changfu Lu (Tianhe Coach Terminal) | ↔ | Huangpu Coach Terminal | |
| 582 | Haizhu Coach Terminal | ↔ | Lingtang Village | |
| 582 Regular Route | Haizhu Coach Terminal | ↔ | Qiyun Lu | |
| 583 | Yuancun Yihenglu | ↔ | Fangcun Xilang | |

=== 600–699 ===
| Route | Terminal | | | Notes |
|---|---|---|---|---|
| 650 | Daluo Village (Guangdong Women's Prison) | ↔ | Jiufo | |
| 651 | Yuncheng Nan'erlu | ↺ | Yuncheng Nan'erlu | One-way loop route. |
| 652 | Nanling Village | ↔ | Jianggao (Guangdong Polytechnic Normal University) | |
| 653 | One-way route: Shabei Metro Station | ↺ | Shabei Metro Station | One-way loop route. |
| 654 | Datian Village (Beidi Ancient Temple) | ↔ | Jianggao Xinlou Village | |
| 655 | Guangdong Youth Vocational College | ↔ | Baisha Village (South China Business College of Guangdong University of Foreign Studies) | |
| 656 | Jiahewanggang Metro Station (Guangzhou No.8 People's Hospital) | ↔ | Longguicheng (Xialiang Metro Station) | |
| Guangzhou 657 | (GZ) Jinshazhou Wharf | ↔ | (FS) Xihua Village (Xihua Temple) | |
| 658A/658B | Jinshazhou (Taole Jie) | ↺ | Jinshazhou (Taole Jie) | Loop route. |
| 659 | Longguicheng (Xialiang Metro Station) | ↔ | Daluo Village (Guangdong Women's Prison) | |
| 660 | Guangdong University of Foreign Studies | ↔ | Open College of Guangdong University of Foreign Studies | |
| 661 | Feixiang Park Metro Station | ↺ | Feixiang Park Metro Station | One-way loop route. |
| 662 | Feixiang Park Metro Station | ↔ | Tangle Lu | |
| 663 | Jiahe Changban Jie | ↺ | Jiahe Changban Jie | One-way loop route. |
| 664 | Baiyun Culture Square | ↔ | Shima | |
| 665 | Jixianyuan | ↔ | Huangshi Lu | |
| 666 | Huangbian Beilu | ↺ | Huangbian Beilu | One-way loop route. |
| 667 | Jiangxia Metro Station | ↺ | Jiangxia Metro Station | One-way loop route. |
| 668 | Huacheng Square West | ↺ | Huancheng Square West | One-way loop route. |
| 669 | Jinsui Lu (Machang Lu Entrance) | ↺ | Jinsui Lu (Machang Lu Entrance) | One-way loop route. |

=== 700–799 ===
| Route | Terminal | | | Notes |
|---|---|---|---|---|
| 701 | Taiying Lu Entrance | ↔ | Huadu Agile Huitong Square | |
| 702 | Jichang Lu | ↔ | Huadu Coach Terminal | |
| 703 | Jichang Lu | ↔ | Huadu Vanke Tianjing Garden | |
| 704 | Shima | ↔ | Lianglong Coach Terminal | |
| 705 | Fangcun Ave. West (Jiaokou Coach Terminal) | ↔ | Zhanqian Lu Bus Terminal | |
| 706 | Guangzhou Zoo | ↔ | Huadu Lake (Baihua Plaza) | |
| 707 | Shenshan | ↔ | Renhe Commercial Center | |
| 708 | Renhexu (Wanjiafu Plaza) | ↔ | R&F Golden Harbor City | Via Baiyun Airport Terminal 1. |
| 709 | Huadu Beixing Coach Terminal | ↔ | Taihe Culture Square | |
| 710 | Huadu Tuiguang Coach Terminal | ↔ | Taihe Culture Square | |
| 711 | Huadu Tuiguang Coach Terminal | ↔ | Jiahewanggang Metro Station | |
| 712 | Huadu Guangzhou College of South China University of Technology | ↔ | Renhe Commercial Center | |
| 713 | Huadu Peizheng College | ↔ | Jianggao (Xiahe Lu) | |
| 714 | Huadu Beixing Coach Terminal | ↔ | Zhongluotan | |
| 715 | Renhe Commercial Center | ↔ | Huadu Shiling Longtou Market | |
| 716 | Zhongluotan Metro Station | ↔ | R&F Jingangcheng | |
| 722 | Jianggao (Dasonggang) | ↔ | Shenshan | |
| 723 | Jianggao (Dasonggang) | ↔ | Xiashi Village | |
| 724 | Baishacun (South China Business College of Guangdong University of Foreign Studies) | ↔ | Renhexu | |
| 725 | Zhongluotan Bus Terminal | ↔ | Xinhe Metro Station | |
| 726 | Zhongluotan Culture Square | ↔ | Shatian Village | |
| 727 | Zhongluotan Bus Terminal | ↔ | Zhuliao Metro Station | |
| 728 | Liangtian Village Committee | ↔ | Longgui Metro Station | |
| 729B | Xicun Metro Station | ↺ | Xicun Metro Station | One-way loop route. |
| 732 | Shatian Ningmeng Changlang | ↔ | Zhongluotan Culture Square | |
| 733 | Hutang Village Committee | ↔ | Migang Village | |
| 734 | Guangzhou South China Business Trade College | ↔ | Liaocai Village Committee | |
| 735 | Longgui Metro Station | ↔ | Tianxin Village | |
| 736 | Longgui Metro Station | ↔ | Shihu | |
| 737 | Renhe (Donghua Village) | ↔ | Gaozeng Metro Station | |
| 738 | Madong Village | ↺ | Madong Village | One-way loop route. |
| 739 | Qinghu Village (Suyuanzhuang) | ↔ | Jiahewanggang Metro Station | |
| 740 | Mingquan Jie | ↺ | Mingquan Jie | One-way loop route. |
| 741 | Feixiang Park Metro Station | ↺ | Feixiang Park Metro Station | One-way loop route. |
| 742 | Shijing Yagang | ↔ | Feixiang Park Metro Station | |
| 743 | Yongtai Xincun | ↔ | Huiqiao Nanlu | |
| 745 | Jinshazhou (Taole Jie) | ↺ | Jinshazhou (Taole Jie) | One-way loop route. |
| Guangzhou 746 | (GZ) Jinshazhou Wharf | ↔ | (FS) Baisha (Zhonghai Jinshawan) | |
| 747A/747B | Shatai Freight Station | ↺ | Shatai Freight Station | Loop route. |
| 750 | Renhexu (Wanjiafu Plaza) | ↔ | Luoxi | |
| 751 | Taihe | ↔ | Baitang Industrial Zone | |
| 752 | Shangbu | ↔ | Feixiang Park Metro Station | |
| 753 | Renhe (Huangbangling) | ↔ | Jiahewanggang Metro Station | |
| 754 | Xiniujiao Village | ↺ | Xiniujiao Village | One-way loop route. |
| 755 | Yuantanling Lu (Institute of Geological Survey) | ↺ | Yuantanling Lu (Institute of Geological Survey) | One-way loop route. |
| 756 | Huaying Lu (Jiahewanggang Metro Station) | ↔ | Tangge Village | |
| 757 | Magang (Guangda Fashion Market) | ↔ | Jinxin Lu (Yunshan Jinxiujiayuan) | |
| 758 | Taihe Metro Station | ↔ | Maofeng Mountain Gaowu Village | |
| 759 | Nanyue Garden | ↺ | Nanyue Garden | One-way loop route. |
| 761 | Chisha (Guangdong University of Finance & Economics) | ↔ | Qiaocheng Garden | |
| 762 | Huangpu Ancient Village | ↔ | Haizhu Coach Terminal | |
| 763 | Chigang Datang | ↔ | Chebei | |
| 764 | Yingzhou Ecological Park | ↔ | Guangdan Garden | |
| 765 | Lijiao Dabutou | ↔ | Zhujiang Beer Factory | |
| 766 | Lijiao Luxi | ↺ | Lijiao Luxi | One-way loop route. |
| 767 | Dajiangyuan | ↔ | Yijing Xilu (Zhujiang Light Textile City) | |
| 768 | Wanshou Lu | ↺ | Wanshou Lu | One-way loop route. |
| 769 Express | Fangcun Coach Terminal | ↔ | Nanpu Metro Station | |
| 770 | Nanjiao Village | ↔ | Fangcun Xilang | |
| 771 | Dongfang Yilu | ↔ | Chebei | |
| 772 | Changfu Lu (Tianhe Coach Terminal) | ↔ | Chebei | |
| 772A | Changfu Lu (Tianhe Coach Terminal) | ↔ | Chebei | |
| 773 | Cencun | ↔ | Chebeinan Metro Station | |
| 774 | Chebeinan Metro Station | ↔ | Tianhe Intelligence City Core Area (Gaotang) | |
| 775 | Longdong (Longyi Villas) | ↔ | South China University of Technology | |
| 776 | Guangzhou East Station Coach Terminal | ↔ | Guangzhou Science City Entrance | |
| 777 | TeeMall | ↔ | Zhujiang New Town | |
| 778 | Wuyang New Town | ↔ | Guangzhou East Station Coach Terminal | |
| 779 | Nanzhou Beilu | ↔ | Zhujiang Beer Factory | |
| 780 | Fangcun Pengkui (Rongdu Garden) | ↔ | Nanzhou Beilu | |
| 781 | Wuyang New Town | ↺ | Wuyang New Town | One-way loop route. |
| 782 | Jiangbei Lu | ↔ | Fangcun Wharf (Xinyi Lu) | |
| 783 | Chajiao Lu | ↺ | Chajiao Lu | One-way loop route. |
| 784 | Meihuayuan Metro Station | ↺ | Meihuayuan Metro Station | One-way loop route. |
| 785 | Tianpingjia | ↺ | Tianpingjia | One-way loop route. |
| 786 | Jiangxiao Lu Entrance | ↔ | Dunhe (Datang West) | |
| 787 | Guanggang New Town | ↺ | Guanggang New Town | One-way loop route. |
| 788 | Wanbo Zhongxin | ↔ | Haizhu Coach Terminal | |
| Guangzhou 789 | (GZ) Shabei Metro Station | ↺ | (GZ) Shabei Metro Station | One-way loop route. |
| Guangzhou 790 | (GZ) Xinghui Jinsha Phase 2 | ↔ | (FS) Houhai Village | |
| 791 | Zhongcheng Lu | ↺ | Zhongcheng Lu | One-way loop route. |
| 792 | Nanhu Peninsula | ↺ | Nanhu Peninsula | One-way loop route. |
| 792A | Shatai Freight Station | ↺ | Shatai Freight Station | One-way loop route. |
| 794 | Jiangxia Metro Station | ↺ | Jiangxia Metro Station | One-way loop route. |
| 795 | Feixiang Park Metro Station | ↺ | Feixiang Park Metro Station | One-way loop route. |
| 796 | Shima | ↔ | Jiahewanggang Metro Station | |
| 797 | Taihe (Private Technology Park) | ↔ | Daluo Village | |
| 798 | Times Rose Garden | ↺ | Times Rose Garden | One-way loop route. |
| 799 | Shihu | ↔ | Jiahewanggang Metro Station (Guangzhou No.8 People's Hospital) | |

=== 800–899 ===
| Route | Terminal | | | Notes |
|---|---|---|---|---|
| 801 | HEMC Guangdong Science Center | ↔ | Tianhe Sports Center | |
| 803 | Guangzhou railway station (Caonuan Park) | ↔ | Dongping | |
| 804 | Guangzhou East railway station | ↔ | Jiahe (Changhong Shuanghe Industrial Zone) | |
| 807 | Guangzhou railway station (Caonuan Park) | ↔ | Jiahe (Changhong Shuanghe Industrial Zone) | |
| 807A | Guangzhou railway station (Caonuan Park) | ↔ | Nanhang Xincun | |
| 808 | Guangzhou East railway station | ↔ | Zhongluotan Cultural Square | |
| 810 | Guangzhou East railway station | ↔ | Baiyun Golf Garden | |
| 811 | Xingmin Lu (igc Mall) | ↔ | Fangcun Xilang | |
| 812 | Jiangnan Dadaonan | ↔ | Dongjiao Teachers' Village | |
| 813 | Gexin Lu (Everbright Garden) | ↔ | Tangxia Residential Area (West Area) | |
| 823 | Tangxi Bus Depot (Yuexi Beilu) | ↔ | Pleasant View Garden | |
| 825 | Jianggao (Dasonggang) | ↔ | Guangzhou Zuohang Huadu Yayao Hengtong Coach Terminal | |
| 826 | Chendong Village | ↔ | Xinhe Metro Station | |
| 827 | Taihe (Shatinggang Village) | ↔ | Jiufo | |
| 828 | Taihe | ↔ | Baishantang | |
| 829 | Nanpu Village | ↔ | Jianggao (Jiangcunxu) | |
| 830 | Jinshazhou Wharf | ↔ | Xiamao (Datong Decoration Expo) | |
| 831 | Baiyun Garden | ↔ | Shijing (Guangzhou No.114 Middle School) | |
| 832 | Hesha | ↔ | Nanfang Hospital | |
| 833 | Guangwei Lu | ↔ | Taihe | |
| 834 | Shijing (Qingfeng Textile and Garment City) | ↔ | Xiamao Coach Terminal | |
| 836 | Haizhu Coach Terminal | ↔ | Baiyunshan Pharmaceutical Factory | |
| 837 | Taihe | ↔ | Jianggao Xiaotang | |
| 838 | Longxi Village Committee | ↔ | Nanfang Tea Market | |
| 839 | Jiaokou Coach Terminal | ↔ | Jiaoxin Dawei Industrial Zone | |
| 840 | Guangzhou railway station (Caonuan Park) | ↔ | Renhe (Everest Energy Charging Station) | |
| 841 | Guangzhou East railway station | ↔ | Shijing (Jiaoxin Village) | |
| 842 | Renhexu (Wanjiafu Plaza) | ↔ | Liangtian Village Committee | |
| 843 | Jianggao (Guangdong Polytechnic Normal University) | ↔ | Gaozeng Metro Station | |
| 862B | Guangzhou railway station (Caonuan Park) | ↔ | Shatai Lubei | |
| 864 | Hailian Lu | ↔ | Baiyunshan Pharmaceutical Factory | |
| 882 | Xiaogangwan | ↔ | Yuancun | |
| 882 Express | Guangzhou Dadaobei (Nanhu Villa) | ↔ | Pleasant View Garden | |
| 884 | Guangzhou East railway station | ↔ | Tianjian ID City | |
| Guangzhou 885 | (GZ) Fangcun Ave. West (Jiaokou Coach Terminal) | ↔ | (FS) Baisha (Zhonghai Jinshawan) | |
| 886 | Nanyue Garden | ↔ | Xingmin Lu (igc Mall) | |

=== 900–999 ===
| Route | Terminal | | | Notes |
|---|---|---|---|---|
| 901 | Lianhe (Huilian Lu) | ↔ | Cencun | |
| 901A | Tianhe Intelligence City Core Area (Gaotang) | ↔ | Huacheng Lu (G.T. Land Plaza) | |
| 902 | Cencun | ↔ | Dongpu | |
| 903 | Tianhe Intelligence City Core Area (Gaotang) | ↔ | Sanxi Metro Station | |
| 920A/B | Huaying Lu (Jiahewanggang Metro Station) | ↺ | Huaying Lu (Jiahewanggang Metro Station) | Loop route. |
| 921 | Jingtai Zhijie | ↔ | Jinxin Lu (Yunshan Jinxiu Garden) | |
| 922 | Yongtai Xincun Entrance | ↔ | Xiling Village | |
| 923 | Cuizhuyuan | ↺ | Cuizhuyuan | One-way loop route. |
| 924 | Huaying Lu (Jiahewanggang Metro Station) | ↔ | Yongxingzhuang | |
| 925 | Xinshixu | ↔ | Xianggang | |
| 926 | Huaying Lu (Jiahewanggang Metro Station) | ↔ | Yongxingzhuang | |
| 929 | Baiyun Culture Square | ↔ | Longhu Industrial Zone | |
| 940 | Kangnan Lubei | ↔ | Xiaolang | |
| 941 | Yunpu Yilu (Zhongyi Pharmaceutical Factory) | ↺ | Yunpu Yilu (Zhongyi Pharmaceutical Factory) | One-way loop route. |
| 942 | Xiangxue Metro Station | ↺ | Xiangxue Metro Station | One-way loop route. |
| 943 | Huangpu Coach Terminal | ↔ | Luogang Xiangxue (Plum Blossom World) | |
| 944 | Luogang Center | ↔ | Olympic Sports Center | |
| 944A | Luogang Center | ↔ | Olympic Sports Center | |
| 945 | Dashadi Metro Station | ↔ | Kaichuang Dadao (Vanke City) | |
| 946 | Guangshan Lu (Wanlong Lu) | ↔ | Nangang (International Toys and Gifts Center) | |
| 948 | Luogang Center | ↔ | Huafeng Temple | |
| 960 | Nanzhou Garden | ↺ | Nanzhou Garden | One-way loop route. |
| 961 | Nanzhou Garden | ↺ | Nanzhou Garden | One-way loop route. |
| 962 | Longxi Dadao (The 3rd Affiliated Hospital of Guangzhou University of Chinese Medicine) | ↺ | Longxi Dadao (The 3rd Affiliated Hospital of Guangzhou University of Chinese Medicine) | One-way loop route. |
| 963 | Gexin Lu (Everbright Garden) | ↔ | Nanji Lu | |
| 964 | Lijiao Dabutou | ↺ | Lijiao Dabutou | One-way loop route. |
| 965 | Fangcun Wharf (Xinyi Lu) | ↺ | Fangcun Wharf (Xinyi Lu) | One-way loop route. |
| 966 | Juanlongwan | ↺ | Juanlongwan | One-way loop route. |
| 967 | Hailian Lu | ↺ | Hailian Lu | One-way loop route. |
| 968 | Hailian Lu | ↺ | Hailian Lu | One-way loop route. |
| Guangzhou 969 | (GZ) Wuyanqiao (Chongweifang) | ↔ | (FS) Zhongnan Garden | |
| 970 | Jiahewanggang Metro Station | ↔ | Dalang Xiabian | |
| 971 | Herui Lu | ↔ | Liaocai (Xanadu Resort) | |
| 972 | Longgui Metro Station | ↔ | Taihe | |
| 973 | Taihe (Fengtai Residential Area) | ↔ | Xingfeng Village | |
| Guangzhou 974 | (GZ) Jinshazhou Wharf | ↔ | (FS) Xihua Village (Xihua Temple) | |
| Guangzhou 974 Regular Route | (GZ) Chengxi Garden | ↔ | (FS) Dongxiu Lu | |
| 975 | Xiwan Lu (Tangning Garden) | ↔ | Yuncheng Nan'erlu | |
| 976 | Zhuliao | ↔ | Taihe | |
| 977 | Shijing (Jiaoxin Village) | ↔ | Jianggao | |
| 978 | Jiahewanggang Metro Station | ↔ | Pingsha (Farm Product Market) | |
| 979 | Gaozeng Metro Station | ↔ | Madong Village | |
| 980 | Huiqiao Xincheng | ↺ | Huiqiao Xincheng | One-way loop route. |
| 981 | Qifu Lu | ↔ | Feixiang Park Metro Station | |
| 982 | Xiamao (Baiyun Lake Park) | ↔ | Feixiang Park Metro Station | |
| 983 | Xiamao (Baiyun Lake Park) | ↔ | Jiahewanggang Metro Station | |
| 984 | Xiamao (Baiyun Lake Park) | ↔ | Dongping (Laowu) | |
| 985 | Taihe | ↔ | Renhe (Lingcai Technical School) | |
| 986 | Nanling Village | ↔ | Jiahewanggang Metro Station | |
| 987 | Tian'an Technology Park | ↔ | Haizhu Coach Terminal | |
| 988 | Pazhou Baoli | ↺ | Pazhou Baoli | One-way loop route. |
| 989 | Taigucang Lu | ↺ | Taigucang Lu | One-way loop route. |
| 990 | Jiangbei Lu | ↔ | Wuyanqiao (Chongweifang) | |
| 991 | Lijiao Dabutou | ↺ | Lijiao Dabutou | One-way loop route. |
| 992 | Jiangtai Lu Metro Station | ↺ | Jiangtai Lu Metro Station | One-way loop route. |
| 993 | Guangzhou Flower Expo (Eastern & Western China Poverty Alleviation Collaborative Trading Market) | ↺ | Guangzhou Flower Expo (Eastern & Western China Poverty Alleviation Collaborative Trading Market) | One-way loop route. |
| 994 | Qiaozhong | ↺ | Qiaozhong | One-way loop route. |
| 995 | Taigucang Lu | ↺ | Taigucang Lu | One-way loop route. |
| 996 | Shuixiu Lu (Juanlongwan) | ↔ | Jiangbei Lu | |
| 997 | Lijiao Dabutou | ↺ | Lijiao Dabutou | One-way loop route. |
| 998 | Yongcui Lu | ↔ | Wanshengwei | |

=== BRT routes ===
| Route | Terminal | | | Notes |
|---|---|---|---|---|
| B1 | Tianhe Sports Center | ↔ | Xiayuan | |
| B1 Express | Tianhe Sports Center | ↔ | Xiayuan | |
| B2 | Guangzhou railway station (Caonuan Park) | ↔ | Dongpu | |
| B2A | Guangzhou railway station (Caonuan Park) | ↔ | Huicai Lu | |
| B3 | Luochongwei | ↔ | Dongpu Coach Terminal | |
| B4 | Guangren Lu | ↔ | Tianhe Intelligence City Core Area (Gaotang) | |
| B4A | Guangren Lu | ↔ | Guangzhou Science City (Tiantai Erlu) | |
| B4B | Tianhe Sports Center | ↔ | Mubo Village | |
| B4 Express | Tianhe Intelligence City Core Area (Gaotang) | AM→ | Guangren Lu | |
| B5 | Huangpu Port | ↔ | Baogang Dadao | |
| B5 Express | Huangpu Port | AM→ | Baogang Dadao | |
| B6 | Tonghe Lu (Lanshan Garden) | ↔ | Huicai Lu | |
| B6 Express | Tonghe Lu (Lanshan Garden) | ↔ | Huicai Lu | Peak hours only. |
| B7 | Dongpu Coach Terminal | ↔ | Haizhu Coach Terminal | |
| B7 Express | Dongpu Coach Terminal | ↔ | Haizhu Coach Terminal | |
| B8 | Baogang Dadao | ↔ | Tangxia Residential Area | |
| B9 | Huajing New Town | ↔ | Zhujiang Nanjingyuan | |
| B10 | Guangzhou railway station (Caonuan Park) | ↔ | Huaguan Lu (Cencun Huolushan Forest Park) | |
| B11 | Lingtang Huangcun Lu | ↔ | Yuancun (Mayland Garden) | |
| B12 | Tianyuan Lu (South China Botanical Garden) | ↔ | Chebei | |
| B13 | Tangxia Village | AM→ | Tianhe Sports Center | Weekdays only. |
| B14 | Tangxia Residential Area | AM→ | Tianhe Sports Center | Weekdays only. |
| B15 | Tianhe Children's Park North Gate | ↔ | Jincheng Garden (Dongfengdong) | |
| B16 | Yuntai Garden | ↔ | Huangpu Sports Center | |
| B17 | Guangzhou East railway station | ↔ | Shihua Lu | |
| B18 | Yongtai Coach Terminal | ↔ | Huicai Lu | |
| B18 Express | Yongtai Lu Entrance | ↔ | Huicai Lu | Peak hours only. |
| B19 | Guangzhou East railway station | ↔ | Yangtao Park (Mayland Garden) | |
| B20 | Guangzhou East railway station | ↔ | Tianhe Children's Park North Gate | |
| B21 | Gexin Lu | ↔ | Tangxia Residential Area | |
| B22 | Wuyang New Town | ↔ | Guangzhou Science City (Chang'an Village) | |
| B23 | Dongpu (Huangcun Xilu) | AM→ | Tianhebei | Weekdays only. |
| B24 | Chebei | ↔ | Luogang Central Area | |
| B25 | Tianhe Sports Center | ↔ | HEMC (Central Hub) | |
| B26 | Lingtang Village | ↔ | Nangang Bus Terminal | |
| B27 | Tianhe Sports Center | ↔ | Huanpu Coach Terminal | |
| B28 | Bonded Area (Liquor Expo) | ↔ | Yuzhu Metro Station | |
| B29 | Olympic Sports Center | ↔ | Xiji | |
| B30 | Maogang Xincun | ↔ | Kangnan Lu North | |
| B31 | Development Zone (Zhujiang Jiayuan) | ↔ | Yuzhu Metro Station | |

=== Peak Expresses ===
Notes: "AM" for morning peak hours only, "PM" for evening peak hours only.

| Route | Terminal | | | Notes |
|---|---|---|---|---|
| Peak Express 2 | Zede Garden (Guangzhou Hospital of TCM Tongdewei Branch) | AM→ ←PM | Tianhe Sports Center | |
| Peak Express 3 | Huanggang (Jindong Fashion Market) | AM→ ←PM | Hualin Temple | |
| Peak Express 4 | Xinshixu | AM→ | Tianhe Sports Center | |
| Peak Express 4 | Xinshixu | ←PM | Victoria Plaza | |
| Peak Express 6 | Chisha (Guangdong University of Finance & Economics) | AM→ | Zhujiang Film Studio (Kecun Metro Station) | |
| Peak Express 7 | Shicha Lu (Jinbi Xincheng) | AM→ ←PM | Zhongshan Wulu | |
| Peak Express 8 | Fangcun Garden | AM→ ←PM | Guangzhou Zoo | |
| Peak Express 9 | Chengxi Garden | AM→ ←PM | Zhongshan Wulu | |
| Peak Express 10 | Tianhe Coach Terminal | PM↔ | Longdong (Guangdong University of Finance) | |
| Peak Express 11 | Wuyang New Town | AM/PM ↔ | Chebei | |
| Peak Express 14 | Luochongwei (Songnan Lu) | AM→ | Luoxi New Town | |
| Peak Express 15 | Baiyun Farm Product Wholesale Market | AM→ ←PM | Victoria Plaza | |
| Peak Express 16 | Luochongwei (Songnan Lu) | AM/PM ↔ | Shixi | |
| Peak Express 17 | Baiyun Cableway | PM→ | Tongdewei (Likangju) | |
| Peak Express 20 | Guihuagang | AM↔ PM→ | Xinke Xiaxincun | |
| Peak Express 21 | Guangzhou railway station (Caonuan Park) | AM/PM ↔ | Tianhe Coach Terminal | |
| Peak Express 22 | Fangcun Dadaoxi | AM→ ←PM | Chigang | |
| Peak Express 23 | Nanan Lu | PM→ | Yuancun Sihenglu Entrance | |
| Peak Express 24 | Gangwanyicun | AM→ ←PM | Guangzhou East railway station | |
| Peak Express 25 | Jinshazhou (Taole Jie) | AM→ ←PM | Zhannan Lu | Also known as "290 Short Express". |
| Peak Express 27 | Tongdewei (Zede Garden) | AM→ | Daxin Lu Entrance | |
| Peak Express 28 | Guangzhou East railway station | ↔ | Bonded Area (Liquor Expo) | Also operates during off-peak hours as "Express 28". |
| Peak Express 29 | Tonghe | AM/PM ↔ | Shangbu | |
| Guangzhou Peak Express 30 | (GZ) Tianhe Sports Center | ↔ | (FS) Vanke Wonderland | Also operates during off-peak hours. |
| Peak Express 31 | Nanyue Garden | AM→ | Tianhe Interchange | |
| Peak Express 31 | Nanyue Garden | ←PM | Guangzhou Zoo South Entrance | |
| Peak Express 32 | Tiyu Xilu | ↔ | Guangdong National Defense Education Base | Also operates during off-peak hours (except noon). |
| Peak Express 34 | Zhongluotan Cultural Square | AM→ ←PM | Guangzhou East railway station | |
| Peak Express 35 | Tianpingjia | AM↔ PM→ | Shangchong | |
| Peak Express 36 | Times Rose Garden | AM→ | Nanfang Building (Cultural Park) | |
| Peak Express 37 | Longkouxi (Suiyuan Residential Area) | AM→ | Zhongshan Balu | |
| Peak Express 38 | Yuancun (Juanmachang) | AM→ ←PM | Guangyuan Xincun | |
| Peak Express 40 | Pleasant View Garden | AM→ ←PM | Jichang Lu | |
| Peak Express 42 | Tianhe Bus Terminal | AM/PM ↔ | Guangzhou Agile Garden | |
| Peak Express 43 | Shijing Hongxing Village | AM→ | Guangzhou railway station (Caonuan Park) | |
| Peak Express 44 | Shijing (Qingfeng Textile and Garment City) | AM→ | Renmin Nanlu | |
| Peak Express 45 | Fangcun Coach Terminal | PM→ | Xiaoping | |
| Peak Express 47 | Longdong (Guangdong University of Finance) | AM→ | Guangdong TV Station | |
| Peak Express 47 | Longdong (Guangdong University of Finance) | ←PM | Garden Hotel | |
| Peak Express 48 | Huanggang | AM/PM ↔ | Tianhe Coach Terminal | |
| Peak Express 49 | Guangzhou East railway station | AM/PM ↔ | Shijing (Jiaoxincun) | |
| Guangzhou Peak Express 50 | (GZ) Cultural Park | AM/PM → | (FS) Peninsula Garden | |
| Peak Express 52 | Jiaokou Coach Terminal | AM→ | Tianhe Sports Center | |
| Peak Express 53 | Fangcun Garden South Entrance | AM→ | Peasant Movement Institute | |
| Peak Express 54 | Tianpingjia | AM↔ PM→ | Guangshan Lu (Wanlong Lu) | |
| Peak Express 55 | Longtan Village | AM→ ←PM | Dajitou (Puppet Arts Theater) | |
| Peak Express 56 | Longxi Village Committee | AM→ ←PM | Kengkou Metro Station | |
| Peak Express 57 | Baisha (Zhonghai Jinshawan) | AM→ | Kangwang Lu (Shangxiajiu) | |
| Peak Express 61 | Baiyun Garden | AM→ ←PM | Chen Clan Academy (Zhongshan Qilu) | |
| Peak Express 63 | Olympic Sports Center | AM→ ←PM | Xiangshan Lu | |
| Peak Express 64 | Luogang | AM→ ←PM | Tianpingjia | |
| Peak Express 65 | Kaichuang Dadao (Vanke City) | AM/PM ↔ | Dashadi Metro Station | |
| Peak Express 66 | Tongdewei (Jindeyuan) | AM→ | Haiyin Bridge South | |
| Peak Express 68 | Fangcun Xilang | AM→ | Xiancun | |
| Peak Express 69 | Datansha (Guangzhou No.1 Middle School) | AM→ | Baiyun Culture Square | |
| Peak Express 70 | Baiyun Lu | AM→ | Shijing (Hongxing Village) | |
| Peak Express 72 | Huadu Beixing Coach Terminal | ↔ | Xinhe Metro Station | Also operates during off-peak hours. |
| Peak Express 73 | Huadu Dongjing (Free Man Garden) | AM/PM ↔ | Xinhe Metro Station | |
| Peak Express 74 | Armed Police Hospital | AM/PM ↔ | Xinjiao Zhonglu (Longtan) | |
| Peak Express 76 | Datang West | AM→ | Aiqun Building | |
| Peak Express 77 | Xinzhou Wharf | AM→ | Chigang Beilu (Yizhou Lu Entrance) | |
| Guangzhou Peak Express 78 | (GZ) Jinghai Lu Entrance | AM→ | (FS) Lishui Dadao (Octopus Merchandise Center) | |
| Peak Express 79 | Pingsha Village (Pingsha Park) | AM→ | Guangzhou Zoo | |
| Peak Express 80 | Institute of Chemistry, CAS | AM→ | Luochongwei (Songnan Lu) | |
| Peak Express 81 | Fangcun Xilang | AM→ | Xingmin Lu (igc Mall) | |
| Peak Express 82 | Cencun Primary School | AM→ ←PM | Wushan Lu Entrance | |

=== Night routes ===
| Route | Terminal | | | Notes |
|---|---|---|---|---|
| Night 1 | Dongshan (Shuqian Lu) | ↔ | Fangcun Garden South Entrance | |
| Night 2 | Chen Clan Ancestral Hall (Zhongshan Qilu) | ↔ | Shitan Xilu Entrance | |
| Night 3 | Shixi | ↔ | Huanggang | |
| Night 4 | Haizhu Coach Terminal | ↔ | Hengfu Lu | |
| Night 5 | Huangsha | ↔ | Tianpingjia | |
| Night 6 | Xihua Lu End | ↔ | Xinjiao Donglu (Longtan Village) | |
| Night 7 | Guangzhou railway station (Caonuan Park) | ↔ | Zhichang Hengmalu | |
| Night 8 | Guangzhou railway station (Caonuan Park) | ↔ | Chisha (Guangdong University of Finance & Economics) | |
| Night 9 | Huangshi Lu | ↔ | Chebei | |
| Night 10 | Dongshankou | ↔ | Longdong (Guangdong University of Finance) | |
| Night 11 | Guangzhou railway station (Caonuan Park) | ↔ | Fangcun Xilang | |
| Night 12 | Guangdong Rongjun Hospital (Rongxiao) | ↔ | Huangshi Lu | |
| Night 13 | Meidong Lu | ↔ | Tianhe Children's Park North Entrance | |
| Night 14 | Dongguanzhuang | ↔ | Guangzhou railway station (Caonuan Park) | |
| Night 15 | Tongdewei (Hengjiao Village) | ↔ | Guangzhou East railway station | |
| Night 16 | Menkougang | ↔ | Chengxi Garden | |
| Night 17 | Guangzhou East railway station | ↔ | Zhucun | |
| Night 18 | Guangzhou railway station (Caonuan Park) | ↔ | Yuancun | |
| Night 19 | Luochongwei (Zengcha Lu) | ↔ | Dongpu Coach Terminal | |
| Night 20 | Chebei | ↔ | Guangzhou South Railway Station | |
| Night 21 | Dongshan (Guigang) | ↔ | Shijing Tancun | |
| Night 22 | Jiangnan Dadaonan | ↔ | Shijing Tancun | |
| Night 23 | Baogang Dadao | ↔ | Huijing Beilu | |
| Night 24 | Zhichang Hengmalu | ↔ | Baiyunshan Pharmaceutical Factory | |
| Night 25 | Guangzhou railway station (Caonuan Park) | ↔ | Dongpu | |
| Night 26 | Yuhai Lu | ↔ | Shijing (Qingfeng Textile and Garment City) | |
| Night 27 | Jiaokou Coach Terminal | ↔ | Chebei | |
| Night 28 | Guangzhou East railway station | ↔ | Lijiang Garden | |
| Night 29 | Jiaokou Coach Terminal | ↔ | Jianghai Dadaozhong | |
| Night 30 | Luochongwei (Songnan Lu) | ↔ | Lijiao Luxi | |
| Night 31 | Haiyin Bridge | ↔ | Zhudao Garden | |
| Night 32 | Keziling (Hetian Lu) | ↔ | Hedong | |
| Night 33 | Fangcun Ave. West (Jiaokou Coach Terminal) | ↔ | Shiliugang | |
| Night 34 | Huangcun Training Base | ↔ | Lijiao (Zhujiang Yujingwan) | |
| Night 35 | Huanghe Lu (Guangzhou Disabled Sports Center) | ↔ | Yuancun Yihenglu | |
| Night 36 | Fangcun Xilang | ↔ | Tangxia Residential Area | |
| Night 37 | Pantang | ↔ | Jianghai Dadaozhong | |
| Night 38 | Guangwei Lu | ↔ | Tianhe Intelligence City Core Area (Gaotang) | |
| Night 39 | Hengbao Plaza | ↔ | Keyun Lu | |
| Night 40 | Guangyuan Xincun | ↔ | Pazhou Bridge North (Mayland Garden East Entrance) | |
| Night 41 | Guangzhou railway station (Caonuan Park) | ↔ | Bonded Area (Liquor Expo) | |
| Night 42 | Regal Riviera | ↔ | Jinyu Garden | |
| Night 43 | Guangdan Garden | ↔ | Ruibaoxiang | |
| Night 44 | Qiaozhong | ↔ | Haizhu Coach Terminal | |
| Night 45 | Chengxi Garden | ↔ | Datang (Jianzhen Garden) | |
| Night 46 | Guangzhou Zoo | ↔ | Shihua Lu | |
| Night 47 | Mubei Lu (Glazed Tiles Factory) | ↔ | Tonghe | |
| Night 48 | Tianhe Sports Center | ↔ | HEMC Sports Center | |
| Night 49 | Xiqu Bus Terminal | ↔ | Yonghe Development Zone | |
| Night 50 | Guangzhou National Archives South | ↺ | Guangzhou National Archives South | One-way loop route. |
| Night 51 | Guangzhou East railway station | ↔ | Luogang Xiangxue (Plum Blossom World) | |
| Night 52 | Xiangxue Metro Station | → | Yonghe Xianjiang | |
| Night 53 | Tianhe Sports Center | ↔ | Cencun | |
| Guangzhou Night 54 | (FS) Baisha (Zhonghai Jinshawan) | ↺ | (FS) Baisha (Zhonghai Jinshawan) | One-way loop route. |
| Night 55 | Guangzhou railway station (Caonuan Park) | ↔ | Xiaozhou | |
| Night 56 | Guangwei Lu | ↔ | Chisha (Guangdong University of Finance & Economics) | |
| Night 57 | Huocun East | ↔ | Xiayuan | |
| Guangzhou Night 58 | (FS) Shamian Xincheng | ↺ | (FS) Shamian Xincheng | |
| Night 59 | Locomotive Depot | ↺ | Locomotive Depot | |
| Night 60 | Vanke Lixiangjia | ↔ | Lianhe (Huilian Lu) | |
| Night 61 | Guangzhou South Railway Station | ↔ | Tianhe Sports Center | |
| Night 62 | Huaying Lu (Jiahewanggang Metro Station) | ↔ | Yongxingzhuang | |
| Night 63 | Jiahewanggang Metro Station | ↔ | Pingsha (Farm Product Market) | |
| Night 64 | Dongpu Metro Station | ↺ | Dongpu Metro Station | One-way loop route. |
| Night 65 | HEMC North Shopping Center | ↔ | Changzhou Wharf | |
| Night 66 | Regal Riviera | ↔ | Xinzhou Wharf | |
| Guangzhou Night 67 | (GZ) Guangwei Lu | ↔ | (FS) Huangqi Sub-district Office | |
| Night 68 | Tianhe Bus Terminal | ↔ | Guangshan Lu (Wanlong Lu) | |
| Night 69 | Tianhe Coach Terminal | ↔ | Jiaokou Coach Terminal | |
| Night 70 | Tianhe Coach Terminal | ↔ | Beishan Village (Xinjiao Donglu) | |
| Night 71 | Guangzhou Zoo South Entrance | ↔ | Yushatan (Yuzhong Lu) | |
| Night 72 | Guangwei Lu | ↔ | Fangcun Xilang | |
| Night 73 | Wenchong Metro Station | ↔ | Punan Lu (Emerald Oasis) | |
| Night 74 | Guangzhou East railway station | ↔ | Taihe (Shatinggang Village) | |
| Night 75 | Huiqiao New Town | ↺ | Huiqiao New Town | One-way loop route. |
| Night 76 | Taihe (Private Technology Park) | ↔ | Luochongwei | |
| Night 77 | Guangzhou East railway station | ↔ | Shijing Tancun | |
| Night 78 Trolleybus | Guangzhou East railway station | ↔ | Zhongshan Balu | |
| Night 79 | Guangzhou railway station (Caonuan Park) | ↔ | Guangzhou South Railway Station | |
| Night 80 | Shima Bus Terminal | ↔ | Xicun Metro Station | |
| Night 81 | Chebei | ↔ | Guangshan Lu (Wanlong Lu) | |
| Night 82 | Jingtai Zhijie | ↔ | Feixiang Park Metro Station | |
| Night 83 | Renhexu (Wanjiafu Plaza) | ↔ | Zhuliao Metro Station | |
| Night 84 | Qinghu Village (Suyuanzhuang) | ↔ | Jiahewanggang Metro Station | |
| Night 85 | Dalang Xiabian | ↔ | Jiahewanggang Metro Station | |
| Night 86 | Longgui Metro Station | ↔ | Taihe | |
| Night 87 | Jichang Lu | ↔ | Guangzhou North Railway Station | |
| Night 88 | Guangzhou railway station (Caonuan Park) | ↔ | Beicheng Bus Terminal | |
| Night 89 | Baogang Dadao | ↔ | Huajing New Town | |
| Night 90 | Tianhe Coach Terminal | ↔ | Huanggang | |
| Guangzhou Night 91 | (GZ) Jinshazhou Wharf | ↔ | (FS) Xihua Village (Xihua Temple) | |
| Night 92 | Huadu Shiling Longtou Market | ↔ | Renhexu | |
| Night 93 | Baogang Dadao | ↔ | Daguan Lubei (Daguan Wet Land Park) | |
| Night 94 | Guangzhou railway station (Caonuan Park) | ↔ | Renhe (Everest Energy Charging Station) | |
| Night 95 | Hesha | ↔ | Nanfang Hospital | |
| Night 96 | Guangzhou railway station (Caonuan Park) | ↔ | Jinshazhou (Taole Jie) | |
| Night 97 | Chebei | ↔ | Luogang | |
| Night 98 | Xiangxue Metro Station | → | Yunpu Yilu (Zhongyi Pharmaceutical Factory) | |
| Night 99 | Kangwang Lu (Shangxiajiu) | ↔ | Datansha (Guangzhou No.1 Middle School) | |
| Night 100 | Tianhe Coach Terminal | ↔ | Huangpu Village | |
| Night 101 | Lijiao | ↔ | Mubei Village | |
| Night 102 | Guangzhou South Railway Station | ↔ | Dongshan | |
| Guangzhou Night 103 | (GZ) HEMC (Guangdong University of Technology) | ↔ | (FS) Suiyan Lu (Majestic Garden) | |
| Night 104 | Huangpu Coach Terminal | ↔ | Luogang Xiangxue (Plum Blossom World) | |
| Night 105 | Nanyue Garden | ↔ | Xingming Lu (igc Mall) | |
| Night 106 | Renhexu | ↔ | Fuli Jingangcheng | Via Baiyun Airport Terminal 1. |
| Night 107 | Baiyun Lu | ↔ | Shijing Hongxing Village | |
| Night 108 | Chenyue Lu | ↔ | Wuyang New Town | |
| Night 109 | Wanbo Center | ↔ | Wuyang New Town | |

=== Science City routes ===
Science City routes are operated in Guangzhou Science City.

| Route | Terminal | | | Notes |
|---|---|---|---|---|
| Science City 2 | Kaichuang Dadao (Vanke City) | ↺ | Kaichuang Dadao (Vanke City) | One-way route. Also known as "K2". |
| Science City 3 | Luogang Center | ↔ | Guangdong National Defense Education Base | Also known as "K3". |

=== Business routes ===
| Route | Terminal | | | Notes |
|---|---|---|---|---|
| Business 1 | Xikeng (Yimin Cloths Market) | ↔ | Shisanhang (Xinglong Beilu) | |
| Business 2 | Shisanhang (Xinglong Beilu) | ↔ | Huanggang (Jindong Cloths Market) | |
| Business 3 | Zhanqian Lu (Xijiao Building) | ↔ | Shachong South | |
| Guangzhou Business 4 | (GZ) Xichang | ↔ | (FS) Pingzhou Jade Street | |
| Business 5 | Datang (Jianzhen Garden) | ↔ | Shahe Hengmalu | |
| Business 6 | Yijing Xilu (Pearl River International Textile City) | ↔ | Shahe Dajie | |

=== Travel and sightseeing routes ===
| Route | Terminal | | | Notes |
|---|---|---|---|---|
| Travel 1 | Yuntai Garden | ↔ | Jiaokou Coach Terminal | |
| Travel 2 | Regal Riviera | ↔ | Fangcun Dadaoxi (Jiaokou Coach Terminal) | |
| Travel 3 | Zhongcheng Lu | ↔ | Pazhou Shiji Village (Huangpu Ancient Port) | |
| Travel & Sightseeing 1 | Zhujiang Swimming Pool | ↔ | Huangpu Ancient Village | Double-decker bus route. |
| Sightseeing 2 | Zhujiang New Town (Haifeng Lu) | ↺ | Zhujiang New Town (Haifeng Lu) | One-way loop & Double-decker bus route. |
| New Central Axis Route | Canton Tower | ↺ | Canton Tower | One-way loop & Double-decker sightseeing bus route. |
| Thousand-year Ancient City Route | Dashatou Wharf | ↺ | Dashatou Wharf | One-way loop & Double-decker sightseeing bus route. |
| Xiguan Flavour Route | Beijing Lu Pedestrian Street | ↺ | Beijing Lu Pedestrian Street | One-way loop & Double-decker sightseeing bus route. |

=== Holiday routes ===
| Route | Terminal | | | Notes |
|---|---|---|---|---|
| Holiday 2 | Guangzhou Railway Station (Caonuan Park) | ↔ | Dafushan Park | |
| Holiday 5 | Guangzhou Zoo South Entrance | ↔ | Changzhou Island (Memorial Museum of 1911 Revolution) | |
| Holiday 7 | Suifeng Village | ↔ | Guangzhou Zoo South Entrance | |
| Holiday 9 | Daguan Lu North (Daguan Wetland Park) | ↔ | Yonghe (Vanke Lixiangjia) | |
| Holiday 10 | Tianhe Coach Terminal | ↔ | Tangcun Metro Station (Guangzhou College of Commerce) | |
| Holiday 11 | Guangzhou East railway station | ↔ | Guangzhou Medical University (Panyu Campus) | |
| Holiday 12 | Changzhou Island (Memorial Museum of 1911 Revolution) | ↺ | Changzhou Island (Memorial Museum of 1911 Revolution) | One-way loop route. |
| Holiday 14 | Yuntai Garden | ↔ | Lijiang Garden | |

=== Expressway routes ===
| Route | Terminal | | | Notes |
|---|---|---|---|---|
| Expressway 2 | Jichang Lu | ↔ | Gaozeng Metro Station | Via Airport Expressway. |

=== Airport Expresses ===
| Route | Terminal | | | Notes |
|---|---|---|---|---|
| Airport Express 1 | Baiyun Airport | ↔ | Air Ticket Office (Guangzhou railway station) | |
| Airport Express 2 | Baiyun Airport | ↔ | Huashi Hotel | |
| Airport Express 3 | Baiyun Airport | ↔ | Xingdu Hotel | |
| Airport Express 4 | Baiyun Airport | ↔ | Vanke Shangcheng Yufu | |
| Airport Express 5 | Baiyun Airport | ↔ | Gangrun Hotel | |
| Airport Express 7A | Baiyun Airport | ↔ | Panyu Hotel | |
| Airport Express 7B | Baiyun Airport | ↔ | Clifford Estates | |
| Airport Express 7C | Baiyun Airport | ↔ | Nansha Free Trade Zone | |
| Airport Express 8A | Baiyun Airport | ↔ | Landmark International Hotel | |
| Airport Express 8B | Baiyun Airport | ↔ | Xintang Yuechao Supreme Hotel | |
| Airport Express 8C | Baiyun Airport | ↔ | Weldon Hotel | |
| Airport Express 10 | Baiyun Airport | ↔ | Guangzhou Textile Trading Park | |
| Airport Express Zengcheng Line | Baiyun Airport | ↔ | Zengcheng Terminal | |
| Airport Express Conghua Line | Baiyun Airport | ↔ | Conghua Terminal | |

=== Airport Bus ===
| Route | Terminal | | | Notes |
|---|---|---|---|---|
| Airport 1 | Terminal 1 (Gate 28) | ↺ | Terminal 1 (Gate 32) | Loop route for Airport Economic Zone. |
| Airport T1-T2 Shuttle Bus | Terminal 2 (Gate 42) | ↔ | Terminal 1 (Gate 10) | |
| Airport Shuttle Bus 1 | P1 Car Park | ↺ | P1 Car Park | |
| Airport Shuttle Bus 2 | Gate A9 | ↔ | P2/P3 Car Park | |
| Airport Shuttle Bus 3 | Gate B5 | ↔ | P2/P3 Car Park | |

== Panyu routes ==
=== Panyu 1–30 ===
| Route | Terminal | | | Notes |
|---|---|---|---|---|
| Panyu 1 | Clifford Estates | ↔ | Bangyan Lu Temporary Bus Terminal | |
| Panyu 2 | Caibian Village | ↔ | Xinli | |
| Panyu 2B | Beicheng Bus Terminal | ↔ | Zhangbian Village | |
| Panyu 3 | Aoyuan Plaza | ↔ | Shiqi | |
| Panyu 4 | Trust-Mart | ↔ | Kangyubeiyuan | |
| Panyu 4B | Trust-Mart | ↔ | Nanshuangyu Village | |
| Panyu 5 | New Shiqiao Coach Terminal | ↔ | Taishi Industrial Zone | |
| Panyu 5 Long Route | New Shiqiao Coach Terminal | ↔ | Taishi Village Committee | |
| Panyu 6 | Bangyan Lu Temporary Bus Terminal | ↔ | Shawan | |
| Panyu 7/7B | Caisan Village (Startoon City) | ↔ | Shawan | |
| Panyu 8 | Trust-Mart | ↔ | Xiaoping Industrial Zone | |
| Panyu 9 | Agile (Chengnanyuanzhu) | ↔ | Dafushan Forest Park | |
| Panyu 9 Long Route | Agile (Chengnanyuanzhu) | ↔ | East Country Garden | |
| Panyu 10 | Panyu Bus Company | ↔ | Nancun Coach Terminal | |
| Panyu 11 | New Shiqiao Coach Terminal | ↔ | Qingsheng Railway Station | |
| Panyu 11 Short Route | New Shiqiao Coach Terminal | ↔ | Dongchong Mingyuan | |
| Panyu 12 | Panyu Children's Park | ↔ | Baomo Garden | |
| Panyu 13 | Trust-Mart | ↔ | Luoxi Nanpu | |
| Panyu 15 | Shawan Jewelry Industrial Park | ↔ | Xiongfeng Shopping Mall | |
| Panyu 16 | Bangyan Lu Temporary Bus Terminal | ↔ | Dafushan Forest Park | |
| Panyu 17 | Luoxi Nanpu | ↔ | Nancun Coach Terminal | |
| Panyu 18 | Aoyuan Plaza | ↔ | Lantang Village | |
| Panyu 19 | Bangyan Lu Temporary Bus Terminal | ↔ | Agile (Chengnanyuanzhu) | |
| Panyu 19 Short Route | Junhua Xiangbaihuafu | ↔ | Zhushan Village | |
| Panyu 20 | Panyu Central Hospital | ↔ | Caibian Village | |
| Panyu 20B | Panyu Central Hospital | ↔ | Lantang Village | |
| Panyu 21 | Panyu Central Hospital | ↔ | Caisan Village (Startoon City) | |
| Panyu 21B | Panyu Central Hospital | ↔ | Jinshan'gu Garden | |
| Panyu 22 | Beihai Village | ↔ | Chadong Village | |
| Panyu 22B | Beihai Village | ↔ | Jiushuikeng Village | |
| Panyu 23 | Kangyubeiyuan | ↔ | Shiqi | |
| Panyu 23B | Jinshan Industrial Park | ↔ | Jiushuikeng Village | |
| Panyu 25 | Xiongfeng Shopping Mall | ↔ | Luoxi Nanpu | |
| Panyu 25 Long Route | Xiongfeng Shopping Mall | ↔ | Xiyi Village Committee | |
| Panyu 26 | Bangyan Lu Temporary Bus Terminal | ↔ | Dafushan Forest Park | |
| Panyu 27 | Panyu Central Hospital | ↔ | Jiushuikeng Village | |
| Panyu 28 | Beicheng Bus Terminal | ↔ | Guanlong Island | |
| Panyu 29 | Dishuiyan Forest Park | ↔ | Panyu District Bus Company | |
| Panyu 30 | Aoyuan Plaza | ↔ | Yuyin Shanfang | |

=== Panyu 51–88 ===
| Route | Terminal | | | Notes |
|---|---|---|---|---|
| Panyu 51 | Panyu Central Hospital | ↔ | Hualong Coach Terminal | |
| Panyu 51B | Bangyan Lu Temporary Bus Terminal | ↔ | Hualong Coach Terminal | |
| Panyu 52 | Guangzhou South Railway Station | ↔ | Shiqi Cultural Plaza | |
| Panyu 52 Long Route | Guangzhou CSR Base | ↔ | Shiqi Cultural Plaza | |
| Panyu 53 | Nanpu Metro Station | ↔ | Hualong Coach Terminal | |
| Panyu 55 | Regal Villas | ↔ | Trust-Mart | |
| Panyu 56 | Guangzhou Agile Garden | ↔ | Xiajiao Metro Station | |
| Panyu 57 | Nanpu Island (Fairview Peninsula) | ↔ | Xiajiao Metro Station | |
| Panyu 58 | Huanan New City | ↔ | Xiajiao Metro Station | |
| Panyu 59 | Hualong Coach Terminal | ↔ | Nancun Coach Terminal | |
| Panyu 60 | Hualong Driver's Examination Zone | ↔ | Xinzao Metro Station | |
| Panyu 61 | Xinzao Metro Station | ↔ | GAC Trumpchi East 5th Entrance | |
| Panyu 62 | Hualong Coach Terminal | ↔ | Shiqi | |
| Panyu 63 | Hualong Coach Terminal | ↺ | Hualong Coach Terminal | One-way loop route. |
| Panyu 66 | Xinzao Metro Station | ↔ | Huachuang Animation & Cartoon Park | |
| Panyu 67 | Shiqiao Coach Terminal | ↔ | Baomo Garden | Panyu tourism line. |
| Panyu 68 | Bangyan Lu Temporary Bus Terminal | ↔ | Gudong Village | |
| Panyu 69 | Nancun Coach Terminal | ↔ | Zhangbian Village | |
| Panyu 70 | Nancun Coach Terminal | ↔ | Wanda Plaza | |
| Panyu 71 | Xinji Village | ↔ | Xinzao Metro Station | |
| Panyu 72 | Agile Beiyuan Bus Station | ↔ | Shiqi | |
| Panyu 73 | Shiqiao Coach Terminal | ↔ | Huachuang Animation & Cartoon Park | |
| Panyu 75 | Guangzhou South Railway Station | ↔ | GAC Parking Lot | |
| Panyu 75B | Guangzhou South Railway Station | ↔ | Wanda Plaza | |
| Panyu 76 | Hualong Coach Terminal | ↔ | Shenglong Community | |
| Panyu 77 | Xinzao Metro Station | ↔ | Jinhe Erlu | |
| Panyu 78 | Shiqi Cultural Plaza | ↔ | Lingbian | |
| Panyu 79 | Shiqi Cultural Plaza | ↔ | Wenbian | |
| Panyu 80 | Shiqi Cultural Plaza | ↔ | Dichong | |
| Panyu 81 | Shiqi Cultural Plaza | ↔ | Jinshan Village Committee | |
| Panyu 82 | Shiqi Cultural Plaza | ↔ | Qianfeng | |
| Panyu 83 | Shiqi Cultural Plaza | ↔ | Changtan | |
| Panyu 85 | Xinzao Metro Station | ↔ | Guangzhou Medical University (Panyu Campus) | |
| Panyu 86 | Jinshan'gu Garden | ↔ | Huanan New Town Temporary Bus Terminal | |
| Panyu 87 | SCUT International Campus Temporary Bus Terminal | ↔ | Xinzao Metro Station | |
| Panyu 88 | SCUT International Campus Temporary Bus Terminal | ↔ | Aoyuan City Plaza | |

=== Panyu 90–165 ===
| Route | Terminal | | | Notes |
|---|---|---|---|---|
| Panyu 91 | Luoxi New Town | ↔ | Panyu District Central Hospital | |
| Panyu 92 | Shiqiao Coach Terminal | ↔ | Asian Games Culture Village | Panyu tourism route. |
| Panyu 92B | Shiqiao Coach Terminal | ↔ | Shiqi Metro Station | |
| Panyu 93 | Panyu Central Hospital | ↔ | Asian Games Culture Village | |
| Panyu 93 Short Route | Shiqi Metro Station | ↔ | Shahuan | |
| Panyu 96 | Shiqiao Coach Terminal | ↔ | Dashi Middle School | |
| Panyu 97 | (GZ) Yanzhou Village | ↔ | (FS) Beijiao Park | |
| Panyu 97 Short Route | Yanzhou Village | ↔ | Du'na Village | |
| Panyu 99 | Jinlongcheng | ↔ | Guangzhou South Railway Station | |
| Panyu 100 | Yanzhou Village | ↔ | Guangzhou South Railway Station | |
| Panyu 101 | Shibi Primary School | ↔ | Duna Village | |
| Panyu 103 | Jinlongcheng | ↔ | Lanhe Bus Terminal | |
| Panyu 108 | Guangzhou South Railway Station | ↔ | Dagang Bus Terminal | Via Shunde District, Foshan |
| Panyu 108B | Guangzhou South Railway Station | ↔ | Panyu Sports School | |
| Panyu 109 | Aoyuan City Plaza | ↔ | Pingyi | |
| Panyu 109B | Aoyuan City Plaza | ↔ | Jinxiu Cultural Center | |
| Panyu 110 | Shiqiao Coach Terminal | ↔ | Guangzhou South Railway Station | |
| Panyu 111 | Panyu Government East Gate (Aeon Mall) | ↔ | Haibang Metro Station | |
| Panyu 125 | (GZ) Aoyuan City Plaza | ↔ | (FS) Huanglong Village Committee | |
| Panyu 125 Short Route | Aoyuan City Plaza | ↔ | East Country Garden | |
| Panyu 126 | Panyu Central Hospital | ↔ | TUS Park Guangzhou Innovation Center | |
| Panyu 128 | Lianhuashan Coach Terminal | ↔ | Hualong Coach Terminal | |
| Panyu 129 | Guangzhou South Railway Station | ↔ | Panyu District Central Hospital | |
| Panyu 130 | Panyu Central Hospital | ↔ | Lanhe Bus Terminal | |
| Panyu 131 | Shiqi Metro Station | ↔ | Shanhailiancheng | |
| Panyu 132 | Shiqi Metro Station | ↔ | Daling Village | |
| Panyu 140 | Jinlongcheng | ↔ | Jiangnan Lu | |
| Panyu 141 | Shiqiao Coach Terminal | ↔ | Jiangnan Lu | |
| Panyu 142 | Shiqiao Coach Terminal | ↔ | Xinken | |
| Panyu 143 | Tian'an Hi-Tech Ecological Park | ↔ | Humen Ferry | |
| Panyu 145 | Shiqiao Coach Terminal | ↔ | Guangzhou South Railway Station | |
| Panyu 146 | Panyu Central Hospital | ↔ | Luoxi New Town | |
| Panyu 147 | Shiqiao Coach Terminal | ↔ | Panyu Central Hospital | |
| Panyu 148 | Shiqiao Coach Terminal | ↔ | Shanan Village | |
| Panyu 148B | Haibang Metro Station | ↔ | Guangzhou Salvage Bureau | |
| Panyu 148B Short Route | Haibang Metro Station | ↔ | Yayuncheng Shanhaiwan | |
| Panyu 149 | Shiqiao Coach Terminal | ↔ | Qingliu Village | |
| Panyu 150/150B | New Shiqiao Coach Terminal | ↔ | Yuwotou Coach Terminal | |
| Panyu 152 | Panyu Central Hospital | ↔ | Dongchong Liye Lu | |
| Panyu 153 | Jinlongcheng | ↔ | Wanqingsha Bus Terminal | |
| Panyu 160 | Panyu Children's Park | ↔ | Lianhuashan Port | |
| Panyu 161 | Qingsheng Railway Station | ↔ | Panyu Government East Gate (Aeon Mall) | |
| Panyu 162 | Asian Games Town | ↔ | Panyu Government East Gate (Aeon Mall) | |
| Panyu 162B | Guangzhou Quality Testing Institute | ↔ | The 2nd Affiliated Hospital of Guangzhou Medical College (Panyu Branch) South Entrance | |
| Panyu 162 Express | Asian Games Town | ↔ | Panyu Government East Gate (Aeon Mall) | |
| Panyu 163 | Aoyuan City Plaza | ↺ | Aoyuan City Plaza | One-way loop route. |
| Panyu 165 | Aoyuan Plaza | ↔ | Tian'an Hi-Tech Ecological Park | |

=== Panyu 180–199 ===
| Route | Terminal | | | Notes |
|---|---|---|---|---|
| Panyu 181 | Xiajiao Metro Station | ↔ | Xiancun | |
| Panyu 182 | Shaxi Dadaodong | ↔ | Huijiang Metro Station | |
| Panyu 183 | Xiajiao Metro Station | ↔ | Xisan Village | |
| Panyu 185 | Shibi Yicun | ↔ | Shaxi Dadaodong | |
| Panyu 186 | Nancun Coach Terminal | ↔ | Nanpu Metro Station | |
| Panyu 187 | Dashi Metro Station | ↔ | Huijiang Metro Station | |
| Panyu 188 | Huanan New Town Temporary Bus Terminal | ↺ | Huanan New Town Temporary Bus Terminal | One-way loop route. |
| Panyu 189/189B | Nanpu Metro Station | ↺ | Nanpu Metro Station | Loop route. |
| Panyu 190 | Dashi Metro Station | ↺ | Dashi Metro Station | One-way loop route. |
| Panyu 191 | Xiajiao Metro Station | ↔ | Shaxi Dadaodong | |

=== Panyu 201–202 ===
| Route | Terminal | | | Notes |
|---|---|---|---|---|
| Panyu 201 | HEMC (Suishi Village) | ↔ | HEMC Sports Center | |
| Panyu 202 | HEMC (Guangdong Science Center) | ↔ | HEMC Sports Center | Panyu tourism line. |

=== Metro feeder routes ===
| Route | Terminal | | | Notes |
|---|---|---|---|---|
| Metro Feeder 4 | Hailongwan | ↔ | Shaxi Dadaodong | |
| Metro Feeder 5 | Hailongwan | ↔ | Xiajiao Metro Station | |
| Metro Feeder 7 | Dashi Metro Station | ↺ | Dashi Metro Station | One-way loop route. |
| Metro Feeder 8 | Dashi Metro Station | ↔ | Kengtou Village | |
| Metro Feeder 9 | Agile Beiyuan | ↔ | Aoyuan City Plaza | |
| Metro Feeder 10A | Clifford Estates | ↔ | Aoyuan City Plaza | |
| Metro Feeder 10A Short Route | Aoyuan Plaza | ↔ | Jinxiu Ecological Garden | |
| Metro Feeder 10B | Jinxiu Ecological Garden | ↔ | Clifford Estates | |

=== Minibus routes ===
| Route | Terminal | | | Notes |
|---|---|---|---|---|
| Panyu Minibus 1 | Xiajiao Metro Station | ↔ | Jixiang Beidao (Luoxi Metro Station) | |
| Panyu Minibus 2 | Shibi Lu Entrance | ↔ | Shibi'ercun Meadow | |
| Panyu Minibus 3 | Panyu Conference Center | ↔ | Donghuzhou Garden | |
| Panyu Minibus 4 | Danshan Xincun | ↔ | Baiyue Plaza East Entrance (Shiqiao Metro Station) | |
| Panyu Minibus 5 | Panyu Conference Center | ↔ | Panyu Government Affairs Service Center | |
| Panyu Minibus 6A | Guangzhou South Railway Station | ↺ | Guangzhou South Railway Station | One-way loop route. |
| Panyu Minibus 7 | HEMC Guangdong Provincial Hospital of TCM | ↺ | HEMC Guangdong Provincial Hospital of TCM | One-way loop route. |

=== Peak Expresses ===
| Route | Terminal | | | Notes |
|---|---|---|---|---|
| Panyu Peak Express 1 | Baiyue Plaza East Entrance (Shiqiao Metro Station) | AM→ | Helenbergh Creative Industry Park | |
| Panyu Peak Express 1 | Baiyue Plaza East Entrance (Shiqiao Metro Station) | ←PM | Helenbergh Creative Industry Park | |

=== Holiday routes ===
| Route | Terminal | | | Notes |
|---|---|---|---|---|
| Panyu Holiday 2 | Guangzhou Agile | ↔ | Children's Park | |

=== Commercial and scenic area routes ===
| Route | Terminal | | | Notes |
|---|---|---|---|---|
| Panyu IKEA Free Shuttle Bus | IKEA Store | ↔ | Hanxi Changlong Metro Station | |
| Travel Sightseeing Bus | Guangzhou South Railway Station | ↔ | Baomo Garden | Panyu tourism line. |

=== South Railway Station night routes ===
These routes are night services for passengers arriving at Guangzhou South Railway Station. They are one-way route and passengers cannot get on the bus at the stops along the way.

| Route | Terminal | | | Notes |
|---|---|---|---|---|
| South Railway Station Night 1 | Guangzhou South Railway Station | → | Luoxi New Town | One-way route. |
| South Railway Station Night 2 | Guangzhou South Railway Station | → | Nancun | One-way route. |
| South Railway Station Night 3 | Guangzhou South Railway Station | → | Panyu Government East Gate (Aeon Mall) | One-way route. |
| South Railway Station Night 4 | Guangzhou South Railway Station | → | Aoyuan Plaza | One-way route. |

=== Higher Education Mega Center routes ===
Notes: "HEMC" for Guangzhou Higher Education Mega Center. HEMC Regular Routes (Chinese: 大学城班线) are not included.

| Route | Terminal | | | Notes |
|---|---|---|---|---|
| HEMC 1 | University of Foreign Studies | ↔ | HEMC (Guangzhou University) | |
| HEMC 2 | South China University of Technology | ↔ | HEMC (Guangzhou University of Chinese Medicine) | |
| HEMC 3 | Guangdong Pharmaceutical University | ↔ | HEMC (Central Hub) | |
| HEMC 4 | Tianpingjia | ↔ | HEMC (Guangzhou University) | |
| HEMC Loop 1 | Guangzhou National Archives South (HEMC) | ↺ | Guangzhou National Archives South (HEMC) | One-way loop route. |
| HEMC Loop 2 | Waihuan Xilu (Beiting Plaza) | ↺ | Waihuan Xilu (Beiting Plaza) | One-way loop route. |

== Nansha routes ==
=== Express routes ===
Express routes (Chinese: 快线; pinyin: Kuàixìan) are prefixed with "K".

| Route | Terminal | | | Notes |
|---|---|---|---|---|
| Nansha K1 | Jiaomen Bus Terminal | ↔ | Tianhe Bus Terminal | |
| Nansha K2 | Wanqingsha (Zhujiang Sub-district) | ↔ | Haizhu Coach Terminal | |
| Nansha K4 | Jiaomen Bus Terminal | ↔ | Guangzhou South Railway Station | |
| Nansha K5 | Jiaomen Bus Terminal | ↔ | Shiqiao Coach Terminal | |
| Nansha K6 | (GZ) Jiaomen Bus Terminal | ↔ | (DG) Humen Central Coach Terminal | |
| Nansha K7 | Dagang Bus Terminal | ↔ | Guangzhou South Railway Station | |

=== Main routes ===
Main routes (Chinese: 干线; pinyin: Gànxìan) are prefixed with "G".

| Route | Terminal | | | Notes |
|---|---|---|---|---|
| Nansha G1 | Jiaomen Bus Terminal | ↔ | Shijiuchong | |
| Nansha G2 | Wanqingsha Bus Terminal | ↔ | Qingsheng Railway Station | |
| Nansha G3 | Jiaomen Bus Terminal | ↔ | Lanhe Bus Terminal | |
| Nansha G4 | Humen Wharf | ↔ | Xinxing Village | |

=== Normal routes ===
Normal routes (Chinese: 普线) have no prefixes.

| Route | Terminal | | | Notes |
|---|---|---|---|---|
| Nansha 1 | Jiaomen Bus Terminal | ↔ | Guangzhou Dockyard | |
| Nansha 1B | Haili Garden | AM→ | Guangzhou Dockyard | |
| Nansha 1B | Haili Garden | ←PM | Guangzhou Dockyard | |
| Nansha 2 | Jiaomen Bus Terminal | ↔ | Sunflower Garden | |
| Nansha 3 | Huangge Bus Terminal | ↔ | Nansha Bay | |
| Nansha 4 | Jiaomen Bus Terminal | ↔ | Tianhou Temple East Entrance | |
| Nansha 5 | Huayu Sunshine Garden | ↔ | Nansha Bay | |
| Nansha 6 | Jinke Jimeiyufeng | ↺ | Jinke Jimeiyufeng | One-way loop route. |
| Nansha 7 | Jinke Jimeiyufeng | ↔ | Shazai Wharf | |
| Nansha 8 | Pearl River Power Plant | ↔ | Guangdong New China Shipyard | |
| Nansha 9 | Wanqingsha Bus Terminal | ↔ | Tuanjiewei | |
| Nansha 10 | Wanqingsha Bus Terminal | ↔ | Hengli Middle School | |
| Nansha 11 | Yongle Farm | ↔ | Shijiuchong | |
| Nansha 12 | Xinxing Village | ↔ | Pearl River Power Plant | |
| Nansha 13 | Humen Ferry | ↔ | Shuiniutou Ferry | |
| Nansha 14 | Qianfeng Community | ↔ | Longzhuxincun | |
| Nansha 15 | Xinhai Village | ↔ | Jinke Jimeiyufeng | |
| Nansha 16 | Xinken | ↔ | Tuanjiewei | Weekdays only. |
| Nansha 17 | Xinxing Village | ↔ | Hengli Farm Ferry | |
| Nansha 18 | Nansha Bay | ↺ | Nansha Bay | One-way loop route. |
| Nansha 19 | Nansha Bay | ↺ | Nansha Bay | One-way loop route. |
| Nansha 20 | Guangzhou Foreign Language School | ↔ | Shangwan Residential Area | |
| Nansha 21 | Xinken | ↔ | Guangzhou Dockyard | |
| Nansha 22 | Fusheng Community | ↔ | Lilong Neighborhood Committee | |
| Nansha 25 | Wanqingsha Bus Terminal | ↔ | Shijiuchong | |
| Nansha 27 | Jiaomen Bus Terminal | ↔ | Logistics Base Phase 3 | |
| Nansha 28 | Fengmayicun | ↔ | Wanqingsha Ferry | |
| Nansha 29 | Outpost | ↔ | Qianshaodui | |
| Nansha 30 | Wanqingsha Ferry | ↔ | Honggang Village | |
| Nansha 31A/31B | Jiaomen Bus Terminal | ↺ | Jiaomen Bus Terminal | One-way loop route. |
| Nansha 32 | Jiaomen Bus Terminal | ↔ | Dagang Bus Terminal | |
| Nansha 33 | Jiaomen Bus Terminal | ↔ | Lanhe Bus Terminal | |
| Nansha 34 | Dongchong Lake | ↔ | Pearl River Power Plant | |
| Nansha 35 | Dongchong Metro Station | ↔ | Dawencun Water Greenway | |
| Nansha 36 | Dongchong Lake | ↔ | Xiqiao Kindergarten | |
| Nansha 37 | Dongfeng Farm | ↔ | Dongdao Village Committee | |
| Nansha 38 | Dongchong Lake | ↔ | Pearl River Power Plant | |
| Nansha 39 | Dagang Bus Terminal | ↔ | Wanqingsha Bus Terminal | |
| Nansha 40 | Dagang Bus Terminal | ↔ | Xinxing Village | |
| Nansha 41 | Lanhe Bus Terminal | ↔ | Gan'gang Village Committee | |
| Nansha 42 | Dagang Bus Terminal | ↔ | Nanshun'ercun End | |
| Nansha 43 | Lanhe Bus Terminal | ↔ | Zhangsong Village | |
| Nansha 44 | Lanhe Bus Terminal | ↔ | Jiubi Village | |
| Nansha 45 | Dagang Bus Terminal | ↔ | Lanhe Bus Terminal | |
| Nansha 46 | Dagang Bus Terminal | ↔ | Xinlianercun | |
| Nansha 46 Short Route | Dagang Bus Terminal | ↔ | Maqian Village (Yuexin Ocean Engineering Company) | |
| Nansha 47 | Dagang Bus Terminal | ↔ | Xinweicun No.8 Team | |
| Nansha 48 | Qingsheng Railway Station | ↔ | Tanzhou Bus Terminal | |
| Nansha 49 | Qinghai'an | ↔ | Tanzhou Bus Terminal | |
| Nansha 50 | Jinxing Dyeing Factory (Old Factory) | ↔ | Yuwotou No.2 Middle School | |
| Nansha 51 | Make No.11 Team | ↔ | Wanzhou Water Gate | |
| Nansha 52 | Dongchong Metro Station | ↔ | Yuwotou No.2 Middle School | |
| Nansha 53 | Nansha Bay | ↔ | Nansha Children's Park | |
| Nansha 54 | New Shiqiao Coach Terminal | ↔ | Tianhou Temple East Entrance | |
| Nansha 55 | Xinxing Village Committee | ↔ | Qingsheng Railway Station | |
| Nansha 56 | Dachong Donglu | ↔ | Qingsheng Railway Station | |
| Nansha 57 | Make Village Committee | ↔ | Qingsheng Railway Station | |
| Nansha 58A/58B | Emerald Blue Bay Community | ↺ | Emerald Blue Bay Community | One-way loop route. |
| Nansha 59 | Tanshan Middle School | ↔ | Yuexin Ship Factory | |
| Nansha 60 | Lanhe Bus Terminal | ↔ | Beidou Ferry (Lanhe) | |
| Nansha 61 | Huangshanlu Forest Park West Entrance | ↔ | Poly City | |
| Nansha 62 | Pearl River Power Plant | ↔ | Guangzhou Dockyard | |
| Nansha 63 | One-way route: Nansha Children's Park | ↺ | Nansha Children's Park | Loop route. |
| Nansha 64 | Jiaomen Bus Terminal | ↔ | Guangzhou South Railway Station | |
| Nansha 65 | Tanzhou Bus Terminal | ↔ | Shiqiao Bus Terminal | |
| Nansha 65 Express | Dagang Bus Terminal | ↔ | Shiqiao Bus Terminal | |
| Nansha 66 | Dagang Bus Terminal | ↔ | New Shiqiao Bus Terminal | |
| Nansha 67 | Dagang Bus Terminal | ↔ | Panyu Central Hospital | |
| Nansha 68 | Lanhe Bus Terminal | ↔ | Shiqiao Bus Terminal | |
| Nansha 68 Express | Lanhe Bus Terminal | ↔ | Shiqiao Bus Terminal | |
| Nansha 69 (Zhongshan 980) | (GZ) Huangge Bus Terminal | ↔ | (ZS) Sanjiao Guoyuhaoting | |
| Nansha 70 | Jiaomen Bus Terminal | ↔ | Shiqiao Bus Terminal | |

=== Minibus routes ===
Minibus routes (Chinese: 微线; pinyin: Wēixìan) are prefixed with "W".

| Route | Terminal | | | Notes |
|---|---|---|---|---|
| Nansha W1A/W1B | Jiaomen Bus Terminal | ↺ | Jiaomen Bus Terminal | Loop route. |
| Nansha W2 | Nansha IT Park | ↺ | Nansha IT Park | One-way loop route. |

== Huadu routes ==
| Route | Terminal | | | Notes |
|---|---|---|---|---|
| Huadu 1 | Zhanqian Lu Bus Terminal | ↔ | Renhe Metro Station | |
| Huadu 2 | Ma'anshan Park West Entrance | ↔ | Civil Aviation College (Chini) | |
| Huadu 2B | Yishan Village | ↔ | Fei'eling Metro Station | |
| Huadu 4 | Huadu Coach Terminal | ↔ | Dongfang Village | |
| Huadu 5 | Zhanqian Lu Bus Terminal | ↔ | Tanbu | |
| Huadu 5B | Fei'eling Metro Station | ↔ | Mingang | |
| Huadu 6 | Huadu Coach Terminal | ↔ | Rongchuang Bus Terminal | |
| Huadu 7 | Huadu Coach Terminal | ↔ | Guangzhou College of South China University of Technology | |
| Huadu 8 | Dongjing Village | ↔ | Sandong Village | |
| Huadu 9 | Zhanqian Lu Bus Terminal | ↔ | Just Industrial Park | |
| Huadu 10 | Chengdong Parking Lot | ↔ | Guangzhou College of South China University of Technology | |
| Huadu 11 | Huzhong Children's Hospital | ↔ | Tuanjie Village | |
| Huadu 15 | Tanbu | ↔ | Chini Xiliantang Village Committee | |
| Huadu 16 | Huzhong Children's Hospital | ↔ | R&F Golden Harbor City | |
| Huadu 16 Yangsheng Regular Route | Huzhong Children's Hospital | ↔ | Yangsheng Village | |
| Huadu 17 | Zhanqian Lu Bus Terminal | ↔ | Timian Lianmin Village | |
| Huadu 17 Wangzishan Regular Route | Zhanqian Lu Bus Terminal | ↔ | Wangzishan Forest Park | |
| Huadu 17 Wulian Regular Route | Zhanqian Lu Bus Terminal | ↔ | Wulian Village | |
| Huadu 18 | Daling Xincun | ↔ | Xinhe Village | |
| Huadu 19 | Rongchuang Bus Terminal | ↔ | Maxi | |
| Huadu 19 Yonggao Regular Route | Food & Beverage Street | ↔ | Yonggao | |
| Huadu 19 Express | Rongchuang Bus Terminal | ↔ | Ma'anshan Metro Station | |
| Huadu 21 | Dongguan Village | ↔ | Hong Xiuquan's Former Residence | |
| Huadu 21 Night Short Route | Dongguancun | ↔ | Hexing Pedestrian Street | |
| Huadu 22 | Jinghu Industrial Zone | ↔ | Huadu Auto Town | |
| Huadu 23 | Huadu Coach Terminal | ↔ | Shiling Lihe Lu | |
| Huadu 23 Knite Company Regular Route | Huadu Coach Terminal | ↔ | Shiling Lihe Lu | |
| Huadu 24 | Huanshan Village | ↔ | Dongfeng Bridge | |
| Huadu 25 | Huadu Lake (Chengdong Parking Lot) | ↔ | Panguwang Park | |
| Huadu 25B | Huadu Lake (Chengdong Parking Lot) | ↔ | Shanqingshuixiu Garden | |
| Huadu 26 | Tanbu Industrial Park | ↔ | Ma'anshan Park West Entrance | |
| Huadu 27 | Maxi | ↔ | People's Park West Entrance | |
| Huadu 29 | Donghu Village | ↔ | Dongjing Village | |
| Huadu 30 | Guangzhou College of South China University of Technology | ↔ | Dongguan Village | |
| Huadu 31 | Tianmahe Mansion | ↔ | Dongguan Village | |
| Huadu 31B | Tianmahe Mansion | ↔ | Guangzhou North Railway Station | |
| Huadu 32 | Huzhong Children's Hospital | ↔ | Huadong Middle School | |
| Huadu 36 | Yayao Xincun | ↔ | Xiuquan Middle School | |
| Huadu 37 | Huafeng School of Technology | ↔ | Huadu Children's Park | |
| Huadu 38 | Yongjun Lu Entrance | ↔ | Ma'anshan Park West Entrance | |
| Huadu 39 | (GZ) Zhanqian Lu Bus Terminal | ↔ | (QY) Vanke City | |
| Huadu 62 | Huadu Coach Terminal | ↔ | Shiling Coach Terminal | |
| Huadu 63 | Huadu Coach Terminal | ↔ | Furong Resort | |
| Huadu 63 Night Short Route | Huadu Coach Terminal | ↔ | Qiling | |
| Huadu 63 Regular Route | Huadu Coach Terminal | ↔ | Rulin Village | |
| Huadu 68 | Zhanqian Lu Bus Terminal | ↔ | Xingren Coach Terminal | |
| Huadu 68 Baini Regular Route | Zhanqian Lu Bus Terminal | ↔ | Xingren Coach Terminal | |
| Huadu 70 | Qingtang Metro Station | ↔ | Vanke Tianjing Garden | |
| Huadu 70A | Guangzhou North Railway Station | ↔ | Zizheng Doctor Temple | |
| Huadu 71 | Huadu Tuiguang Coach Terminal | ↔ | Renhe Market | |
| Huadu 73 | Zhanqian Lu Bus Terminal | ↔ | Shenshan | |
| Huadu 75 | Huadu Lake (East Entrance) | ↔ | Jewellery Market | |
| Huadu 75A | Yayao Bus Terminal | ↔ | Huadu School Affiliated to South China Normal University | |
| Huadu 76 | Huadu Lake (East Entrance) | ↔ | Guangzhou College of South China University of Technology | |
| Huadu 76A | Huadu Lake (East Entrance) | ↔ | Rongchuang Bus Terminal | |
| Huadu Night 76 | Huadu Lake (East Entrance) | ↔ | Rongchuang Bus Terminal | |
| Huadu 80 | Guangzhou North Railway Station | ↔ | Shiling Yishan Village Committee | |
| Huadu 81 | Huadu Coach Terminal | ↔ | Shanhu | |
| Huadu 83 | Huadu Lianglong Coach Terminal | ↔ | Huadu Shiling Longtou Market | |
| Huadu 83B | Huadu Lianglong Coach Terminal | ↔ | Qiling Market | |
| Huadu 84 | Guangzhou North Railway Station | ↔ | Taiping Metro Station | |
| Huadu 85 | Guangzhou North Railway Station | ↔ | Beixing Sky Ville | |
| Huadu 86 | Yayao Xincun | ↔ | Jinbi Royal Water Villa | |
| Huadu 88 | Qiling Huayan Temple | ↔ | Chini Hospital | |
| Huadu 89 | Qianjincun | ↔ | Jinbi Royal Water Villa | |
| Huadu 92 | Zhanqian Lu Bus Terminal | ↔ | Huanggang Middle School | |
| Huadu 93 | (GZ) Zhanqian Lu Bus Terminal | ↔ | (QY) Vanke City | |
| Guangzhou - Huadu Express | Guangzhou Coach Terminal | ↔ | Huadu Coach Terminal | |
| Guangzhou - Tanbu Express | Guangzhou Coach Terminal | ↔ | Tanbu Coach Terminal | |
| Shijiao Express | Guangzhou Coach Terminal | ↔ | Shijiao Coach Terminal | |
| Huadu - Conghua | Conghua Coach Terminal | ↔ | Huadu Coach Terminal | |
| Shiling - Guangyuan | Shiling Coach Terminal | ↔ | Guangyuan Coach Terminal | |
| Xinhua - Guihuagang | Yabao New Town | ↔ | Guihuagang | |

== Conghua routes ==
=== Normal routes ===
| Route | Terminal | | | Notes |
|---|---|---|---|---|
| Conghua 1 | The 5th Affiliated Hospital of Southern Medical University | ↔ | Fenghuang Village Committee | |
| Conghua 2 | Conghua Coach Terminal | ↔ | Guangzhou Institute of Technology | |
| Conghua 3 | Galaxy Oasis | ↔ | Mingzhu Industrial Zone | |
| Conghua 4 | Conghua Coach Terminal | ↔ | Wenquan Mingyue Shanxi | |
| Conghua 5 | New Library | ↔ | Taiping Bus Terminal | |
| Conghua 6 | Conghua Coach Terminal | ↔ | Chengkang | |
| Conghua 7 | Technical College of Water Resources and Electric Engineering | ↔ | The 5th Affiliated Hospital of Southern Medical University | |
| Conghua 8 | City Construction College | ↔ | Dongfeng Metro Station | |
| Conghua 9 | Conghua Coach Terminal | ↔ | Aotou Coach Terminal | |
| Conghua 10 | Conghua Coach Terminal | ↔ | Gaoping | |
| Conghua 11 | Conghua Coach Terminal | ↔ | Liangkou Market | |
| Conghua 12 | Conghua Coach Terminal | ↔ | Lyutian Coach Terminal | |
| Conghua 13 | Conghua Coach Terminal | ↔ | Baishuizhai | |
| Conghua 14 | Conghua Coach Terminal | ↔ | Taolian | Via Xuanxing. |
| Conghua 15 | Conghua Coach Terminal | ↔ | Wutu | |
| Conghua 16 | Conghua Coach Terminal | ↔ | Macun | |
| Conghua 17 | Conghua Coach Terminal | ↔ | Dongfeng Metro Station | |
| Conghua 18 | Conghua Coach Terminal | ↔ | Minle | |
| Conghua 19 | Conghua Coach Terminal | ↔ | Taolian | Via Guancun Lu. |
| Conghua 20 | Conghua Coach Terminal | ↔ | Wutu | |
| Conghua 21 | Conghua Coach Terminal | ↔ | Dongfeng Metro Station | |

=== Express routes ===
| Route | Terminal | | | Notes |
|---|---|---|---|---|
| Conghua 4 Express | Conghua Coach Terminal | ↔ | Wenquan Mingyue Shanxi | |

=== Minibus routes ===
| Route | Terminal | | | Notes |
|---|---|---|---|---|
| Conghua 301 | Conghua Coach Terminal | ↔ | Waipojia | |
| Conghua 302 | Conghua Coach Terminal | ↔ | Shangluo Village Committee | |
| Conghua 401 | Hualin Lake | ↔ | Hualin Lake | |
| Conghua 402 | Minzhu Management Committee | ↔ | Huaxia College | |
| Conghua 403 | Aotou Coach Terminal | ↔ | Shanxin | |
| Conghua 404 | Aotou Coach Terminal | ↔ | Huangmao Village | |
| Conghua 405 | Aotou Coach Terminal | ↔ | Minle Village Committee | |
| Conghua 406 | Aotou Coach Terminal | ↔ | Dingkeng Village Committee | |
| Conghua 407 | Aotou Coach Terminal | ↔ | Shanhu Village Committee | |
| Conghua 501 | Lyutian Coach Terminal | ↔ | Sancun | |
| Conghua 502 | Lyutian Coach Terminal | ↔ | Lianma | |
| Conghua 503 | Lyutian Coach Terminal | ↔ | Xiaoshan | |
| Conghua 504 | Lyutian Coach Terminal | ↔ | Dongmingxu | |
| Conghua 505 | Lyutian Coach Terminal | ↔ | Shixiang | |
| Conghua 506 | Lyutian Coach Terminal | ↔ | Qianguang | |
| Conghua 601 | Liangkou Coach Terminal | ↔ | Dongmingxu | |
| Conghua 602 | Liangkou Coach Terminal | ↔ | Jincun Village Committee | |
| Conghua 603 | Liangkou Coach Terminal | ↺ | Hequn Village Committee | One-way loop route. |
| Conghua 604 | Liangkou Coach Terminal | ↺ | Hequn Village Committee | One-way loop route. |
| Conghua 605 | Liangkou Coach Terminal | ↔ | Bishui Xincun | |
| Conghua 606 | Liangkou Coach Terminal | ↔ | Yingcun Village | |
| Conghua 607 | Liangkou Coach Terminal | ↔ | Panxi Village Committee | |
| Conghua 608 | Liangkou Coach Terminal | ↔ | Yexinwei | |
| Conghua 701 | Wenquan Hotel (Bilangqiao) | ↔ | Nanping Village Committee | |
| Conghua 702 | Wushi Village | ↔ | Nanfang College of Sun Yat-sen University (Main Entrance) | |
| Conghua 801 | Taiping Metro Station | ↺ | Taiping Metro Station | One-way loop route. |
| Conghua 802 | Taiping Bus Terminal | ↔ | Shengangxu | |
| Conghua 803 | Yuliangtou | ↔ | Shenqi Entrance | |
| Conghua 804 | Taiping Metro Station | ↔ | Cheliao | |
| Conghua 805 | Taiping Metro Station | ↔ | Fenshui Village Committee | |
| Conghua 806 | Getang Village Committee | ↔ | Niuxinling | |

=== Night routes ===
| Route | Terminal | | | Notes |
|---|---|---|---|---|
| Conghua Night 1 | New Library | ↔ | Taiping Bus Terminal | |
| Conghua Night 2 | Conghua Coach Terminal | ↔ | Dongfeng Metro Station | |
| Conghua Night 3 | Conghua Coach Terminal | ↔ | Dongfeng Metro Station | |

=== Remote routes ===
| Route | Terminal | | | Notes |
|---|---|---|---|---|
| GZ-CH 1 Express | Guangzhou Coach Terminal | ↔ | Conghua Coach Terminal | |
| GZ-CH 4 Express | Tianhe Coach Terminal | ↔ | Conghua Coach Terminal | |
| GZ-CH 6 | Dongpu Coach Terminal | ↔ | Conghua Coach Terminal | |
| Conghua - Shiqiao | Conghua Coach Terminal | ↔ | Shiqiao Coach Terminal | |
| Conghua - Guangzhou South | Conghua Coach Terminal | ↔ | Guangzhou South Coach Terminal | |
| Conghua - Zengcheng | Conghua Coach Terminal | ↔ | 2nd Bus Zengcheng Terminal | |
| Conghua - Xintang | Conghua Coach Terminal | ↔ | Xintang Coach Terminal | |

== Zengcheng routes ==
=== Normal routes ===
| Route | Terminal | | | Notes |
|---|---|---|---|---|
| Zengcheng 1 | Wanda Plaza West | ↔ | Dapuwei | |
| Zengcheng 2 | Bus Company | ↔ | Yangang Bridge | |
| Zengcheng 3 | Vocational Education Park | ↔ | Baihua Villas | |
| Zengcheng 4 | Henglang Village Committee | ↔ | Kangjian Company | |
| Zengcheng 5 | Sunshine Home | ↔ | Qianhejie (Haoyuan) | |
| Zengcheng 6A | Liantang Service Station | ↔ | Administration Center | |
| Zengcheng 6B | Liantang Service Station | ↔ | Guangdong Encironmental Protection School | |
| Zengcheng 7 | Gualyu Square East | ↔ | Huali College | |
| Zengcheng 8 | Shanjiao Village | ↔ | Chuxi Water Hub | |
| Zengcheng 9 | Bus Company | ↔ | Qunxin Garden | |
| Zengcheng 9 Express | Guangming Coach Terminal | ↔ | Xintang Government | |
| Zengcheng 10 | Vocational Education Park | ↔ | Shitan Coach Terminal | |
| Zengcheng 11 | Erqi Zengcheng Coach Terminal | ↔ | Fuhe Coach Terminal | |
| Zengcheng 11A | Erqi Zengcheng Coach Terminal | ↔ | Guantang Village | |
| Zengcheng 12 | Erqi Zengcheng Coach Terminal | ↔ | 214 Station | |
| Zengcheng 13 | Guangyun Zengcheng Coach Terminal | ↔ | Xiancun Bus Terminal | |
| Zengcheng 14 | Erqi Zengcheng Coach Terminal | ↔ | Shenchong Village | |
| Zengcheng 15 | Guangyun Zengcheng Coach Terminal | ↔ | Paitan Coach Terminal | |
| Zengcheng 16 | Guangming Coach Terminal | ↔ | Baishuizhai | |
| Zengcheng 17 | Guangming Coach Terminal | ↔ | Zhengguo Coach Terminal | |
| Zengcheng 18 | Guangyun Zengcheng Coach Terminal | ↔ | Jianglong Bridge | |
| Zengcheng 19 | Guangming Coach Terminal | ↔ | Erlongshan Ecological Park Scenic Area | |
| Zengcheng 20 | Xintang Park | ↔ | Xinsha Metro Station | |
| Zengcheng 21 | Zhangbei Village | ↔ | Dongjiang Shoufu | |
| Zengcheng 22 | Huangshatou Village | ↔ | Xiapu Village | |
| Zengcheng 23 | Xintang Coach Terminal | ↔ | Yonghe Middle School | |
| Zengcheng 24 | Golden Lake City | ↔ | Shacun Metro Station | |
| Zengcheng 25 | Emerald Oasis | ↔ | Xinsha Metro Station | |
| Zengcheng 26 | Phoenix City Bus Terminal | ↔ | Dadun Market | |
| Zengcheng 26A | Fengxinyuan | ↔ | Dadun Market | |
| Zengcheng 27 | Xintang Coach Terminal | ↔ | Tianxin Village | |
| Zengcheng 28 | Xintang Coach Terminal | ↔ | Emerald Oasis | |
| Zengcheng 29 | Shapu Square | ↔ | Xindun Dadao | |
| Zengcheng 30 | Xinsha Metro Station | ↔ | Xiajiang Xincun | |
| Zengcheng 31 | RT-Mart | ↺ | RT-Mart | One-way loop route. |
| Zengcheng 32 | Xintang Coach Terminal | ↺ | Xintang Coach Terminal | One-way loop route. |
| Zengcheng 33 | Xintang Coach Terminal | ↺ | Xintang Coach Terminal | One-way loop route. |
| Zengcheng 34 | 214 Station | ↔ | Sanjiang Coach Terminal | |
| Zengcheng 35 | Xiajiang Xincun | ↔ | Zhongxin Coach Terminal | |
| Zengcheng 36 | Fuhe Coach Terminal | ↔ | Baijiang Metro Station | |
| Zengcheng 37 | Xingda Agricultural Market | ↔ | Xiancun Coach Terminal | |
| Zengcheng 38 | Nizi Market | ↔ | Hailun Chuntian | |
| Zengcheng 39 | Xiancun Bus Terminal | ↔ | Shangdong Yangguang | |
| Zengcheng 40 | Gengliao Village | ↔ | Dongjiang Shoufu | |
| Zengcheng 41 | Paitan Coach Terminal | ↔ | Fuhe Market | |
| Zengcheng 42 | Lake Island Scenic Area | ↔ | Baishuizhai | |
| Zengcheng 43 | Xintang Wanda Plaza | ↔ | Zengcheng Yingyuan School | |
| Zengcheng 44 | Xintang Wanda Plaza | ↔ | Xiancun Coach Terminal | |
| Zengcheng 45 | Xintang Dadao | ↔ | Jiuru Village | |
| Zengcheng 46 | Xintang Coach Terminal | ↺ | Xintang Coach Terminal | One-way loop route. |
| Zengcheng 47 | Zengcheng Square Metro Station | ↺ | Zengcheng Square Metro Station | One-way loop route. |
| Zengcheng 48 | Zengcheng Square Metro Station | ↺ | Zengcheng Square Metro Station | One-way loop route. |
| Zengcheng 49 | Shantian Metro Station | ↔ | Zhucun Coach Terminal | |
| Zengcheng 50 | Zengcheng Square Metro Station | ↔ | Xiagang Village Committee | |
| Zengcheng 51 | Zhongxin Coach Terminal | ↔ | Yuanfen Village | |
| Zengcheng 52 | Fuhe Coach Terminal | ↔ | Zhongxin Coach Terminal | |
| Zengcheng 53 | Yongxing Village | ↔ | Xihe Village | |
| Zengcheng 54 | Zhongxin Coach Terminal | ↔ | Jiantang Village | |
| Zengcheng 55 | Old Xifu Bridge | ↔ | Shitan Hospital | |
| Zengcheng 56 | Shitan Coach Terminal | ↔ | Yuepu Village | |
| Zengcheng 57 | Shitan Coach Terminal | ↔ | Jiapu Village | |
| Zengcheng 58 | Guangyun Zengcheng Coach Terminal | ↔ | Zhukeng Village | |
| Zengcheng 59 | Paitan Coach Terminal | ↔ | Yuzhen Village | |
| Zengcheng 60 | Paitan Coach Terminal | ↔ | Zhangdongkeng Village | |
| Zengcheng 61 | Paitan Coach Terminal | ↔ | Beiyin Village | |
| Zengcheng 62 | Paitan Coach Terminal | ↔ | Lingshanxu | |
| Zengcheng 63 | Mai Village Committee | ↔ | Huangtang Village | |
| Zengcheng 66 | Guangming Coach Terminal | ↔ | Lake Island Scenic Area | |
| Zengcheng 67 | Guangming Coach Terminal | ↔ | She People Village | |
| Zengcheng 67A | Guangming Coach Terminal | ↔ | Shuimei Village | |
| Zengcheng 68 | Zhengguo Coach Terminal | ↔ | Longtanpu | |
| Zengcheng 69 | Hedong Village | ↔ | Dengshan Village | |
| Zengcheng 70 | Guangming Coach Terminal | ↔ | Fuhe Coach Terminal | |
| Zengcheng 71 | Zhucun Bus Terminal | ↔ | Fuhe Coach Terminal | |
| Zengcheng 72A | Zhengguo Coach Terminal | ↔ | Baimianshi Village | |
| Zengcheng 72B | Zhengguo Coach Terminal | ↔ | Yinchang Village | |
| Zengcheng 73 | Erqi Zengcheng Coach Terminal | ↔ | Yuanfen Village | |
| Zengcheng 74 | Huali College | ↔ | 1978 Cultural Creative Town | |
| Zengcheng 75 | (GZ) Baijiang Metro Station | ↔ | (DG) Xindiancheng | |
| Zengcheng 76 | (GZ) Shitan Coach Terminal | ↔ | (DG) Shijie Tianyating | |

=== Remote routes ===
| Route | Terminal | | | Notes |
|---|---|---|---|---|
| GZ-ZC 1 | Guangzhou Coach Station | ↔ | Erqi Zengcheng Coach Station | |
| GZ-ZC 1 Express | Guangzhou Coach Station | ↔ | Erqi Zengcheng Coach Station | |
| GZ-ZC 2 | Guangzhou Coach Station | ↔ | Yonghe Coach Station | |
| GZ-ZC 3 | Guangzhou Coach Station | ↔ | Xintang Coach Station | |
| GZ-ZC 5 | Guangzhou Coach Station | ↔ | Shitan Coach Station | |
| GZ-ZC 6 | Jiaokou Coach Station | ↔ | Erqi Zengcheng Coach Station | |
| GZ-ZC 9 | Tianhe Coach Station | ↔ | Zengcheng Guangming Coach Station | |
| Guangzhou East - Zengcheng | Guangzhou East Coach Terminal | ↔ | Erqi Zengcheng Coach Station | |
| Guangzhou South - Zengcheng | Guangzhou South Coach Terminal | ↔ | Erqi Zengcheng Coach Station | |
| Baishuizhai Travel Line | Guangzhou Coach Terminal | ↔ | Baishuizhai | |

== Guangzhou-Foshan routes ==
Notes: "FS" for "Foshan", "GZ" for "Guangzhou".

| Route | Terminal | | | Notes |
|---|---|---|---|---|
| Foshan 200 | (FS) Foshan West Railway Station | ↔ | (GZ) Jiaokou Coach Terminal | |
| Foshan 211 | (FS) Dali Coach Terminal | ↔ | (GZ) Guangzhou South Railway Station | |
| Foshan 232 | (FS) Qiandeng Lake | ↔ | (GZ) Fangcun Coach Terminal | |
| Foshan 232B | (FS) Songfeng Lu Hub | ↔ | (GZ) Fangcun Coach Terminal | |
| Foshan 236 | (FS) Jiujiang Coach Terminal | ↔ | (GZ) Jiaokou Coach Terminal | |
| Foshan 244 | (FS) Guanyao Coach Terminal | ↔ | (GZ) Fangcun Coach Terminal | |
| Foshan 250 | (FS) Danzao Coach Terminal | ↔ | (GZ) Jiaokou Coach Terminal | |
| Foshan 251 | (FS) Urban Xiqiao (Guanshan 2nd Bridge) | ↔ | (GZ) Jiaokou Coach Terminal | |
| Foshan 252 | (FS) Guanyao Coach Terminal | ↔ | (GZ) Xunfenggang Metro Station | |
| Foshan 263 | (FS) Xiaotang Coach Terminal | ↔ | (GZ) Jiaokou Coach Terminal | |
| Foshan 263 Short Route | (FS) Dali Coach Terminal | ↔ | (GZ) Jiaokou Coach Terminal | |
| Foshan 275 | (FS) Shishan Higher Education Mega Center | ↔ | (GZ) Fangcun Coach Terminal | |
| Foshan 276 | (FS) Dongfang Plaza North Entrance | ↔ | (GZ) Luochongwei | |
| Foshan 277 | (FS) Luocun Wuzhuang | ↔ | (GZ) Jiaokou Coach Terminal | |
| Foshan 278 | (FS) Tanglian (Dalan) | ↔ | (GZ) Fangcun Coach Terminal | |
| Foshan 279 | (FS) Guicheng Metro Station | ↔ | (GZ) Datansha (GZ No.1 High School) | |
| Foshan 307 | (FS) Shunde Coach Terminal | ↔ | (GZ) Lanhe | |
| Foshan 308 | (FS) Ronggui Coach Terminal | ↔ | (GZ) New Dagang Coach Terminal | |
| Foshan 312 | (FS) Shunde Coach Terminal | ↔ | (GZ) New Dagang Coach Terminal | |
| Foshan 314 | (FS) Shunde Coach Terminal | ↔ | (GZ) Baomo Garden | |
| Foshan 349 | (FS) Beijiao Park | ↔ | (GZ) Baomo Garden | |
| Foshan Lishui 07 | (FS) Lishui Coach Terminal | ↔ | (FS) Jinshazhou (Sanjun Market) | Via Baiyun District, Guangzhou |
| Foshan Lishui 07B | (FS) Hegui Industrial Park Zone A | ↔ | (FS) Jinshazhou (Sanjun Market) | Via Baiyun District, Guangzhou |
| Foshan Dali 12 | (FS) Lishui Coach Terminal | ↔ | (GZ) Fangcun Dadao Xi | |
| Foshan Dali 12B | (FS) Jiulongchong | ↔ | (GZ) Fangcun Dadao Xi | |
| Foshan Dali 17B | (FS) Longyaohuafu | ↔ | (GZ) Fangcun Coach Terminal | |
| Foshan Dali 18 | (FS) Shahai Village | ↔ | (FS) COB Jinshawan | Via Baiyun District, Guangzhou |
| Foshan Dali 20 | (FS) Dali Coach Terminal | ↔ | (GZ) Xunfenggang Metro Station | |
| Foshan Ronggui 12 | (FS) Linyue Market | ↔ | (GZ) Fangcun Coach Terminal | |
| Foshan K6 | (FS) Lingnantiandi | ↔ | (GZ) Guangzhou South Railway Station | |
| Foshan K6 Express | (FS) Lingnan Dadao Hub (Chancheng District People's Government) | ↔ | (GZ) Guangzhou South Railway Station | |
| Foshan K330 | (FS) Longjiang Sub-bureau of Environment, Transportation & Urban Management | ↔ | (GZ) Guangzhou South Railway Station | |
| Foshan K334 | (FS) Ronggui Coach Terminal | ↔ | (GZ) Guangzhou South Railway Station | |
| Foshan K349 | (FS) Lecong Hub | ↔ | (GZ) Shiqiao Coach Terminal | |
| Foshan K990 | (FS) Jun'an Hub | ↔ | (GZ) Guangzhou South Railway Station | |
| Foshan Nanhai Express 03 | (FS) Nanhai Coach Terminal | ↔ | (GZ) Guangzhou South Railway Station | |
| GZ-FS Line 8 | (FS) Sanshui Coach Terminal | ↔ | (GZ) Jiaokou Coach Terminal | |
| GZ-FS Line 12 | (FS) Danzao Coach Terminal | ↔ | (GZ) Fangcun Coach Terminal | |
| GZ-FS Line 17 | (FS) Gaoming Coach Terminal | ↔ | (GZ) Datang Coach Terminal | |
| GZ-FS Line 18 | (FS) Gaoming Coach Terminal | ↔ | (GZ) Jiaokou Coach Terminal | |
| GZ-FS Line 001 | (FS) Guanyao Coach Terminal | ↔ | (GZ) Guangzhou Coach Terminal | |
| GZ-FS Line 002 | (FS) Xiqiao Coach Terminal | ↔ | (GZ) Guangzhou Coach Terminal | |

== Guangzhou-Dongguan routes ==
Notes: "DG" for "Dongguan", "GZ" for "Guangzhou".

| Route | Terminal | | | Notes |
|---|---|---|---|---|
| Dongguan 75 | (DG) Hengling Village | ↔ | (GZ) Baijiang Metro Station | |
| Dongguan 76 | (DG) Tanghong Terminal Station | ↔ | (GZ) Shitan Coach Terminal | |
| Dongguan 609 | (DG) Jiaoli Yong'an Zhichang | ↔ | (GZ) Xinsha Metro Station | |
| Dongguan 615 | (DG) Wangniudun Cultural Plaza | ↔ | (GZ) Baijiang Metro Station | |
| Dongguan 616 | (DG) Fumin Lu | ↔ | (GZ) Chuangye Lu | |
| Dongguan 617 | (DG) Zhongtang Terminal Station | ↔ | (GZ) Chuangye Lu | |
| Dongguan 618 | (DG) Zhangpeng Village | ↔ | (GZ) Development District Hospital | |
| Dongguan 619 | (DG) Xinji Featured Ancient Villages | ↔ | (GZ) Chuangye Lu | |

== See also ==
- Lines of Guangzhou Water Bus
- Lines of Guangzhou Metro
