= Guangqing Expressway =

Road in Guangdong, China

Guangqing Expressway (广清高速) connects the cities Guangzhou and Qingyuan in the Chinese province of Guangdong.
