= Danzao =

Town in Nanhai District, Guangdong, China

Coordinates: 23.04273°N 112.91454°E

Danzao Town (Chinese: 丹灶镇) is a town in Nanhai District, Foshan, Guangdong, China.
