= Dongchong, Guangzhou =

Town of Nansha District, Guangzhou

Coordinates: 22°53′05″N 113°27′18″E

Dongchong 东涌镇
- Town
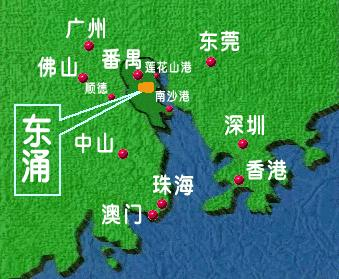

- Location of Dongchong in Guangdong
- Country: People's Republic of China
- Province: Guangdong
- District: Nansha District

Dongchong (simplified Chinese: 东涌镇; traditional Chinese: 東涌鎮; pinyin: Dōngchōng Zhèn) is a town of Nansha District, Guangzhou, Guangdong Province, People's Republic of China.

== Geography ==
Dongchong is located in the center of the Pearl River Delta. It is 18 kilometers from the centre of Nansha.

== Communities and villages ==
Within Dongchong there are several communities and villages, including:

- Dawen Village
- Dongchong community
- Shiji
- Nanchong
- Dongdao
- Guantan
- Shipai
- Qingsheng
- Sansha
- Shagongbao
- Taishi
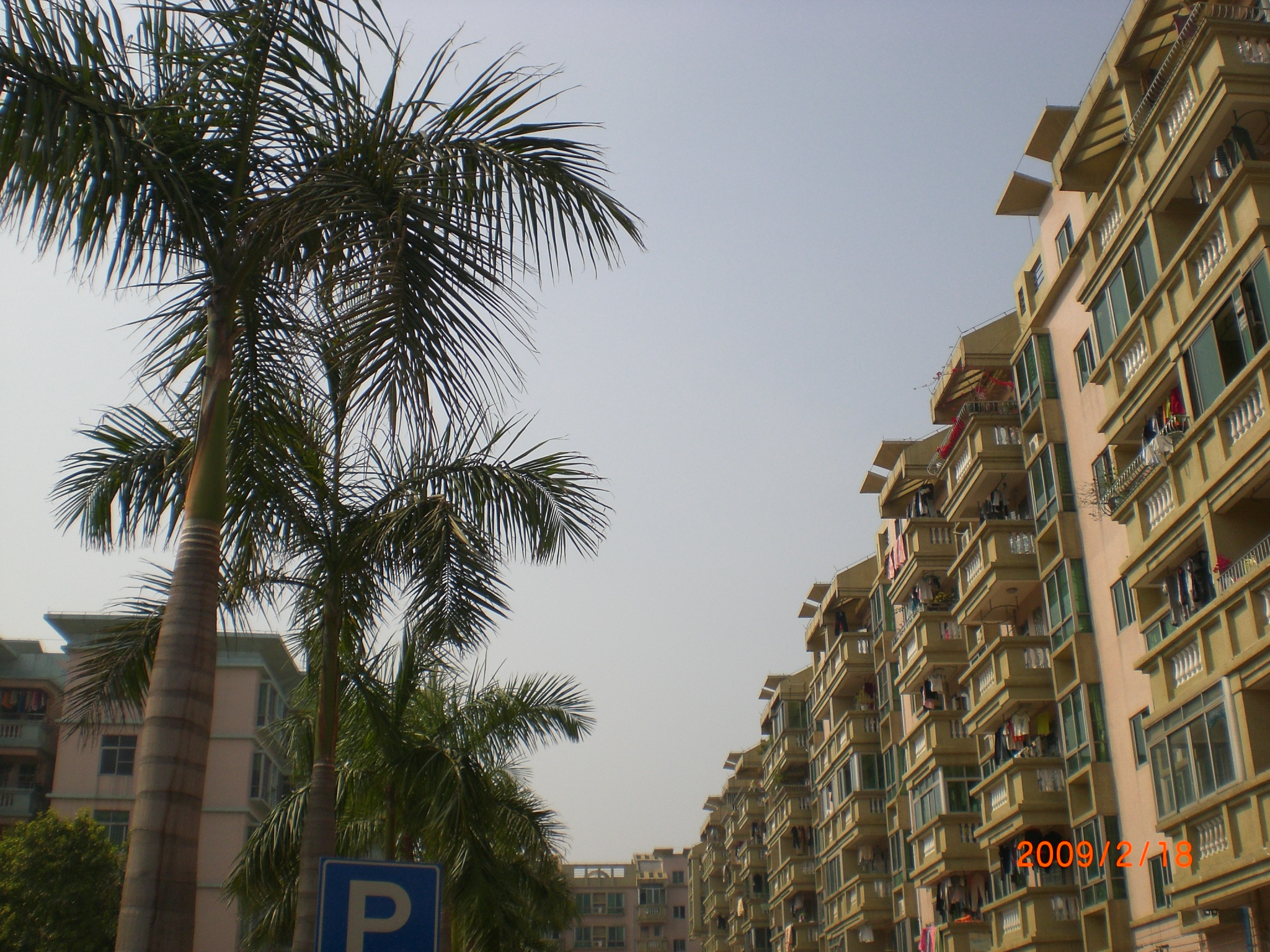
A housing complex

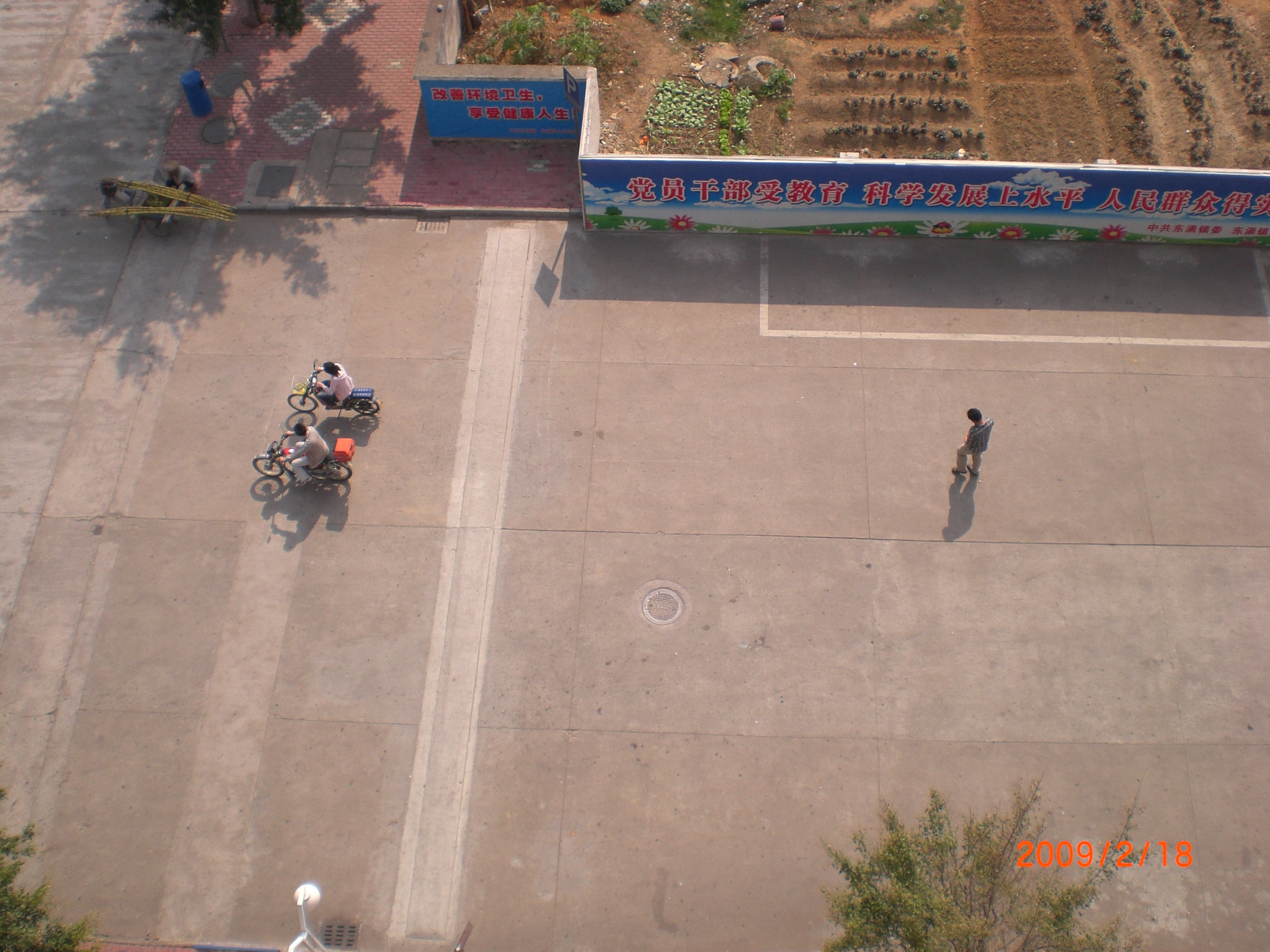
A street in the center of Dongchong Town

== Economy ==
The economy of Dongchong is rapidly changing from agricultural based to industrial. Located in the Pearl River Delta and close to Hong Kong, the area has attracted manufacturers from Hong Kong and abroad.

== Transportation ==
Residents of Dongchong usually commute by motorcycle or public transit. Guangzhou Metro's Dongchong Station serves the area and connects it with the rest of Guangzhou. Panyu Public Transport operates public buses that run through major roads in Dongchong using an RFID card system or cash.

Private bus operators and taxis are used by visitors and non-local residents from Nansha Ferry Terminal.

Dongchong is conveniently linked to other parts of Guangzhou and Pearl River Delta through Nansha Port Expressway, G4W Guangzhou–Macau Expressway and Guangzhou South Second Ring Expressway. Humen Second Bridge which linked Dongchong to Dongguang is under construction and is expected to complete by 2018.

The Guangzhou–Shenzhen–Hong Kong express rail link is under construction, passing through Dongchong; the high-speed Shiziyang tunnel links Dongchong to Shenzhen on the other side of the Pearl River. The Qingsheng station opened on 26 December 2011. From there it travels south to Dongguan and Shenzhen North Station and travels north to Guangzhou South Railway Station.

== Tourism ==
A list of attractions in Dongchong:

- Dongchong Greenway
- Dawen Greenway-upon-Water
- Dongchong Fortress
- Jixiangwei Museum
- Dongchong Cultural Centre

== Education ==
Schools include the Dongchong Middle School and Dongchong First Primary School. The Dongchong Middle School is one of the two dedicated sites in Nansha for running the National Entrance Examination. The Dongchong Central Kindergarten is one of the around 150 provincial-level public kindergartens in Guangdong.

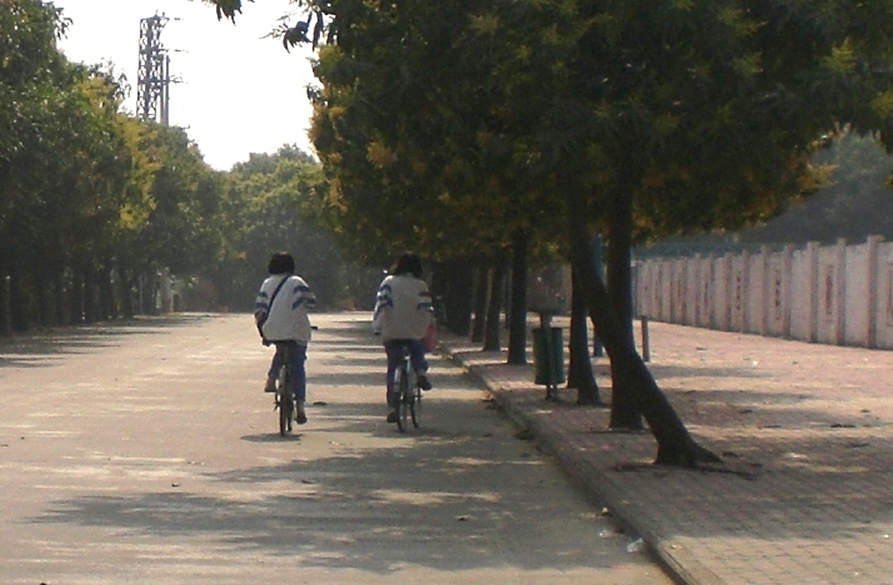
Two students riding bicycles on their way to school.

== Real Estate ==
- Wanxing Garden
- Jinxiu New Town
- Dongfa Second Avenue
- Austin Villa: Austin Villa (名苑別墅) is a residential development in Dongchong (东涌) in Panyu District, Guangzhou. The development consists of a mix of flats and houses built in the mid 1990s to 2001. Situated within Austin Villa are more than 1,000 homes (villas), most of them are owned by Hongkongers or overseas Chinese. There are 2 major clubhouses with basic facilities and a restaurant. Also located towards the front of the development is a small shopping arcade for residents to buy their necessities here. A shuttle runs in the development to transport residents around the development and to the main gate. Panyu Public Transport route 11 bus also stops at Austin Villa.
