= Taishi, Guangzhou =

Taishi 太石村
- Village
- Location in Guangdong
- Coordinates (Taishi Elementary School): 22°53′06″N 113°24′12″E
- Country: People's Republic of China
- Province: Guangdong
- Sub-provincial city: Guangzhou
- District: Nansha
- Town: Dongchong

Taishi Village (Chinese: 太石村; pinyin: Tàishí Cūn) is a small hamlet (population about 2,000), in the town of Dongchong, Nansha District, Guangzhou, Guangdong, formerly in the now-disbanded Yuwotou Town (鱼窝头镇) of Panyu District, Guangzhou. It is best known for being the flashpoint for democratic election reform in the region during 2005. In July that year, authorities grudgingly allowed the launch of a petition to dismiss the director of the villagers' committee, Chen Jingshen, who was accused of corruption involving a large land deal. Later, they arrested dozens of villagers and their legal advisors, and closed down a web forum on the continuing confrontation between petitioners with regional officials and police who opposed the removal of Chen. Authorities seized a village accounts book that was intended to serve as evidence for embezzlement. The conflict drew nationwide attention, and led Western observers to doubt whether the Chinese Communist Party would be willing to allow a higher level of democracy.
