= Ping'an Bridge station =

Metro station in Hangzhou, China

Ping'an Bridge 平安桥
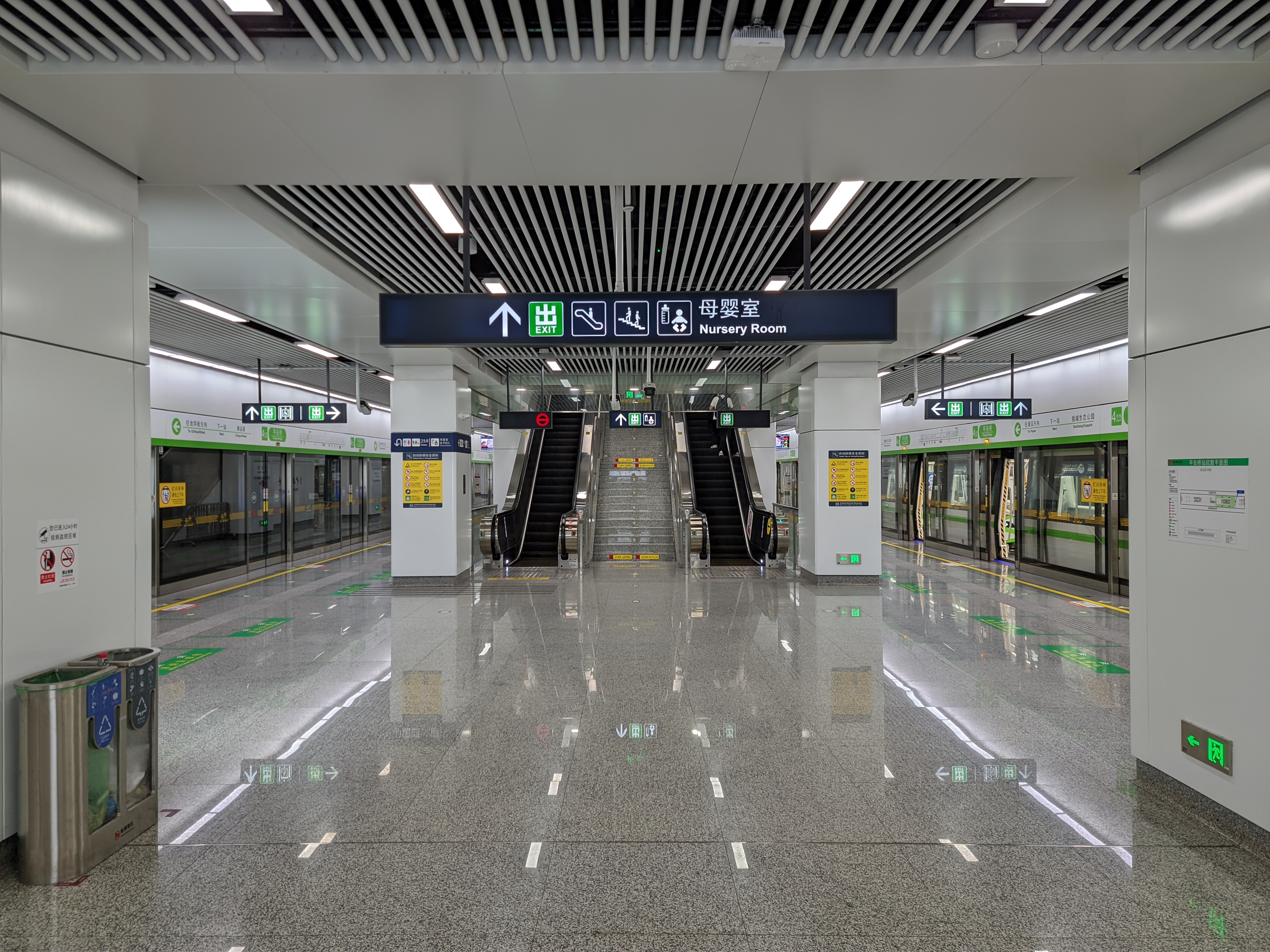
- Platforms

General information
- Location: Pinglian Road × Gongkang Road; Gongshu District, Hangzhou, Zhejiang; China
- Coordinates: 30°21′34″N 120°08′20″E
- System: Hangzhou Metro
- Operated by: Hangzhou Metro Corporation
- Line: Line 4
- Platforms: 2 (1 island platform)

Construction
- Structure type: Underground
- Accessible: Yes

History
- Opened: 21 February 2022

Services
Preceding station	Hangzhou Metro	Following station
Ducheng Ecopark towards Puyan	Line 4	Chuyun Road towards Chihua Street
Xiecun towards Yatai Road	Line 15 Under Construction	Kangqiao towards Chongxian
Location

Ping'an Bridge (simplified Chinese: 平安桥; traditional Chinese: 平安橋) is a metro station of Line 4 of the Hangzhou Metro in China. It is located in Gongshu District of Hangzhou. The station was opened on 21 February 2022. It will be a transfer station of Line 4 and Line 15.

== Station layout ==
Ping'an Bridge has two levels: a concourse, and an island platform with two tracks for line 4.

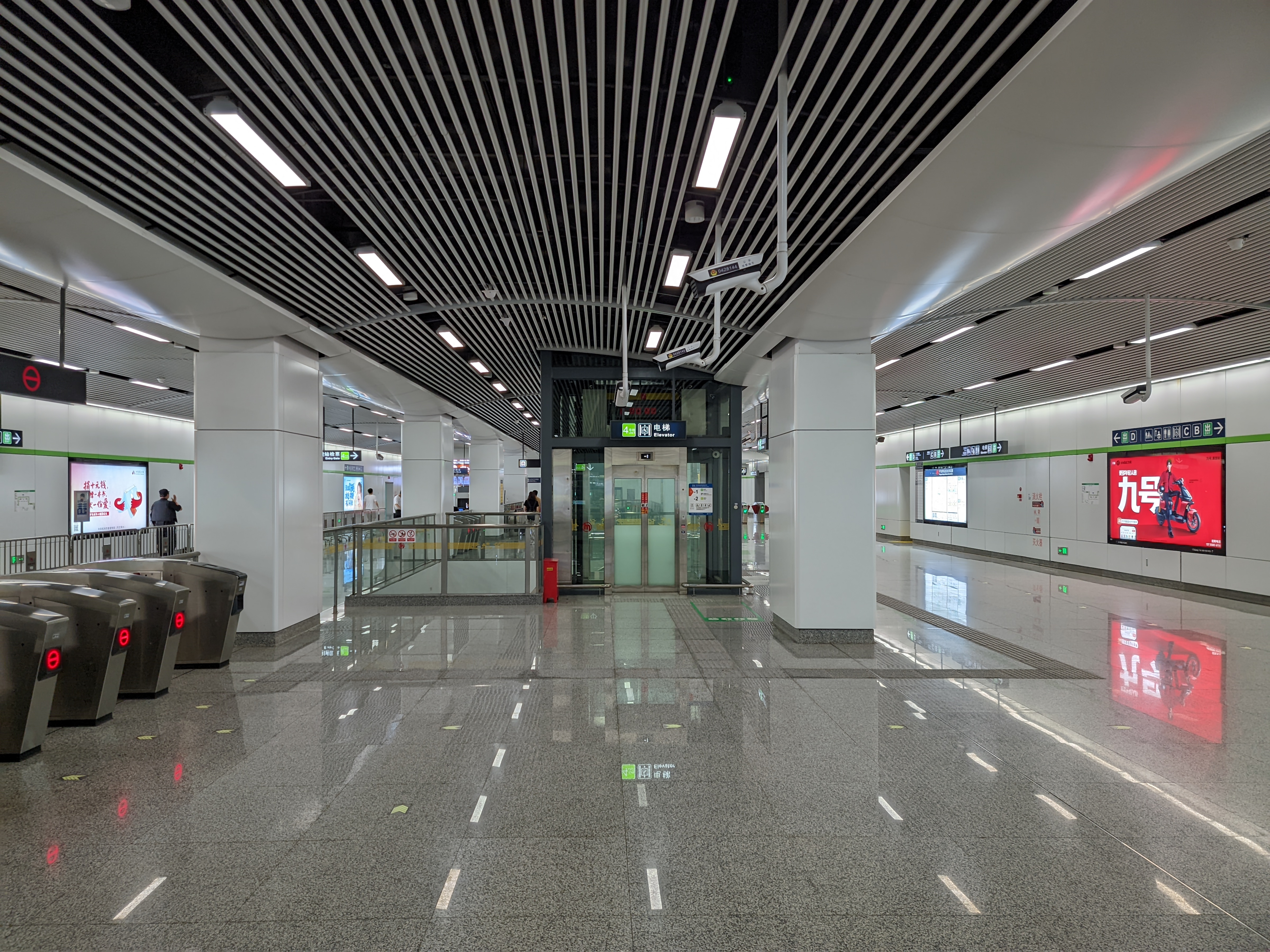
Concourse

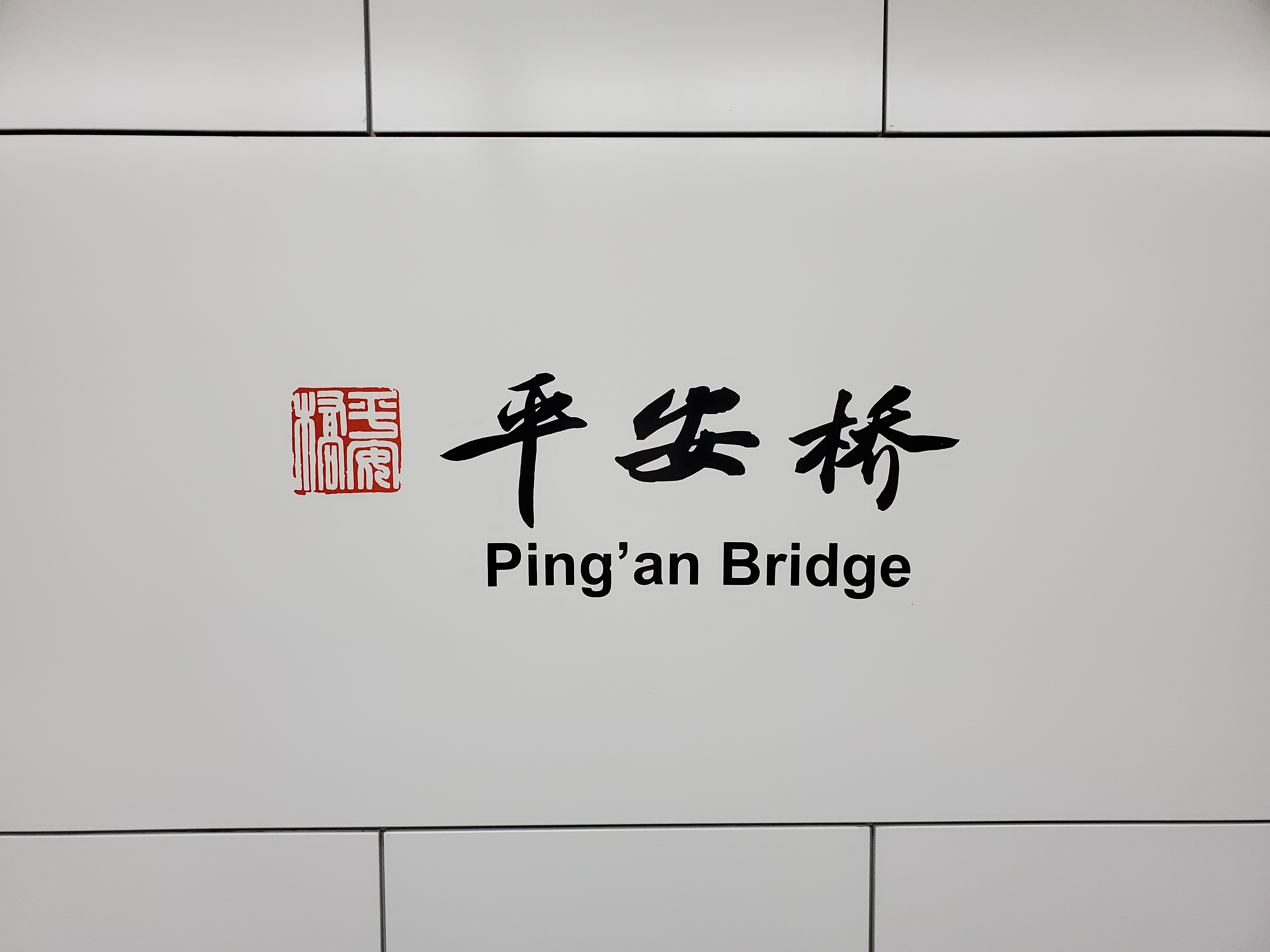
Station name in Chinese calligraphy

== Entrances/exits ==
There are 4 exits.

- B1 & B2: north side of Pinglian Road, Guyang Road
- C: south side of Pinglian Road, Guyang Road
- D: south side of Pinglian Road, Gongkang Road
