= Guangdong Zhongyuan High School =

High school in Guangzhou, China

Coordinates: 22.9333°N 113.3606°E

- 广东仲元中学

Location
- 2 Xichong Street, Shiqiao, Panyu District; Guangzhou; China

Information
- Type: Public
- Motto: Virtuousness, perseverance, erudition, vigorousness
- Established: 1934
- Principal: Tan Xiaohua(谭小华)
- Staff: 200+
- Enrollment: 3500+
- Colors: Red, Blue, White
- Website: http://www.gdzyzx.cn/

Guangdong Zhongyuan High School
- Simplified Chinese: 广东仲元中学
- Traditional Chinese: 廣東仲元中學
Transcriptions
Standard Mandarin
- Hanyu Pinyin: Gǔangdōng Zhòngyúan Zhōngxué
Yue: Cantonese
- Jyutping: gwong2 dung1 zung6 jyun4 zung1 hok6

Guangdong Zhongyuan High School (Chinese: 广东仲元中学; pinyin: Gǔangdōng Zhòngyúan Zhōngxué), commonly abbreviated as Zhongyuan (Chinese: 仲元), located in Shiqiao, Panyu, Guangzhou, is a public school established in 1934, in memorial of Deng Zhongyuan (Chinese: 邓仲元), an important assistant of Dr. Sun Yat-sen. The school has been regarded as one of the prestigious high schools in Guangdong Province and the country.
