= Panyu, Guangzhou =

Panyu 番禺区 Punyu
- District
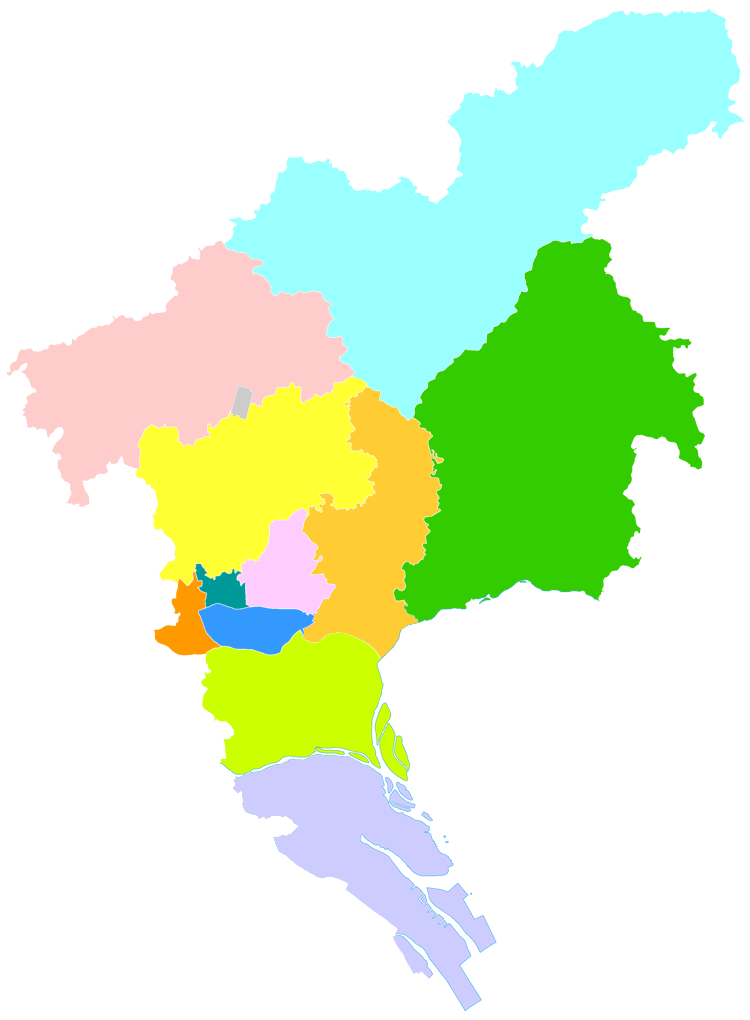
- Panyu in Guangzhou
- Coordinates: 22°56′11″N 113°23′03″E
- Country: People's Republic of China
- Province: Guangdong
- Sub-provincial city: Guangzhou

Area
  - Total: 530 km^{2} (200 sq mi)

Population (2020 census)
  - Total: 2,658,397
  - Density: 5,000/km^{2} (13,000/sq mi)
- Time zone: UTC+8 (China Standard)
- Postal code: 511400
- Area code: 020
- Website: www.panyu.gov.cn

Panyu, Guangzhou
- Chinese: 番禺
- Guangdong Romanization: Pun1-yu4
- Hanyu Pinyin: Pānyú (Note: Often mispronounced as Fānyú.)
- Postal: Punyu
Transcriptions
Standard Mandarin
- Hanyu Pinyin: Pānyú (Note: Often mispronounced as Fānyú.)
Yue: Cantonese
- Yale Romanization: Pūnyùh
- Jyutping: Pun1-jyu4
- Canton Romanization: Pun1-yu4

Panyu, formerly romanized as Punyü, (Note: Panyu was also alternately romanized as Pwan-yu.) is one of 11 urban districts of the prefecture-level city of Guangzhou, the capital of Guangdong Province, China. Since January 1975, Panyu County has been under Guangzhou's administration. In 1992, Panyu County was renamed to Panyu county-level city, still under Guangzhou's administration. It was subsequently renamed to Panyu District on 10 July 2000. The present district covers an area of about 530 km^{2} (200 sq mi).

== Geography ==
Panyu lies at the heart of the Pearl River Delta. It extends from latitudes 22.26' to 23.05', and from longitudes 113.14' to 113.42'. Facing the Lion Sea in the east and the estuary of the Pearl River in the south, its eastern border is separated from Dongguan by a strip of water, and the western border of Panyu is adjacent to the cities of Nanhai, Shunde and Zhongshan, while it abuts Haizhu District in the north. The site of the People's government of Panyu is Shiqiao which is 17 km (11 mi) from downtown Guangzhou and 38 and 42 nautical miles (70 and 78 km) from the cities of Hong Kong and Macau, respectively. Shiqiao may have once been called "Stone Bridge town", but because of war, the characters changed, so Shiqiao was rewritten using the characters for "city" and "bridge".

== History ==
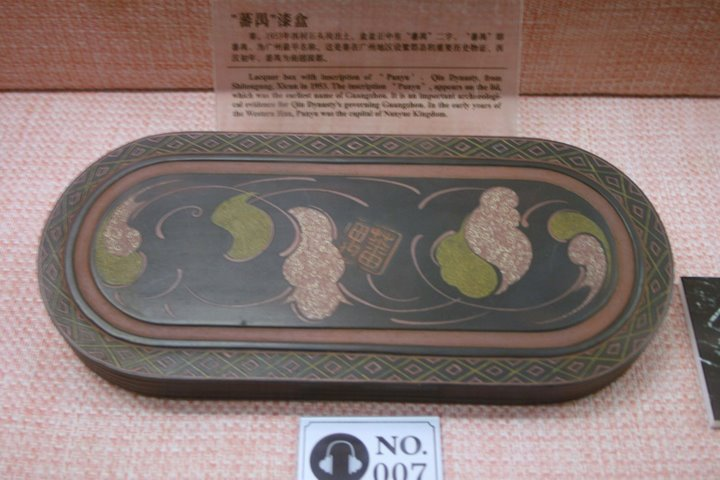
A Chinese lacquerware box with the "Panyu" name on its surface, dating from the Qin dynasty.

The Chinese settlement at Panyu was established by the Qin armies under Zhao Tuo during their first failed invasion of the Baiyue in Guangdong in 214 BC. There are at least 11 separate theories on the etymology of the name. Upon the fall of the Qin, Zhao Tuo established Panyu as the capital of his kingdom of Nanyue in 204 BC. Archaeological evidence shows that it was a burgeoning commercial center: among the present material object remnants, there are those of Southeast Asian, Indian, and even African origin.

The Panyu County originally included the eastern half of Guangzhou's urban area until 1921, when Guangzhou City was established and separated from the Panyu and Nanhai counties. Yuexiu District, most of Baiyun and Huangpu districts, parts of Liwan, and all of Haizhu and Tianhe were originally part of Panyu County but were merged with Guangzhou as it expanded. In January 1975, Panyu County was transferred to Guangzhou's jurisdiction. In 1992, Panyu County became the Panyu county-level city and remained under Guangzhou's administration. It became a district of Guangzhou on 10 July 2000. On 28 April 2005, the southern part of Panyu was split off as the new Nansha District. On 30 September 2012, three southern towns of Panyu—Dongchong, Dagang, and Lanhe — were moved to Nansha's jurisdiction.

== Administrative divisions ==
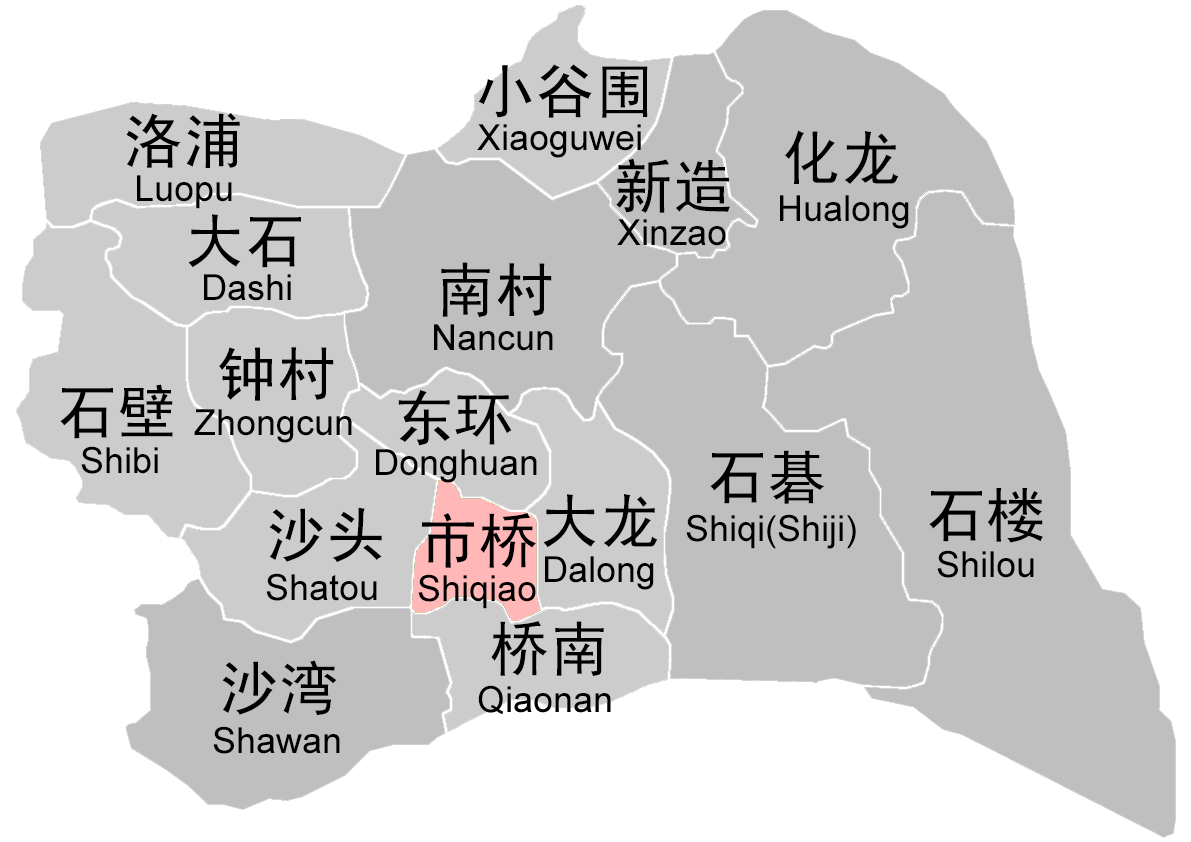
Administrative divisions of Panyu

Panyu district administers ten subdistricts (街道) and six towns (镇). The district's executive and legislative headquarters, and its judiciary are based in the Shiqiao, together with the CPC and PSB branches. On 1 December 2012 three towns (Dongchong, Dagang, & Lanhe) were transferred to Nansha District.

Name	Chinese (S)	Hanyu Pinyin	Canton Romanization	Population (2010)	Area (km^{2})
Shiqiao Subdistrict	市桥街道	Shìqiáo Jiēdào	xi5 kiu4 gai1 dou6	168,701	20.15
Zhongcun Subdistrict	钟村街道	Zhōngcūn Jiēdào	zung1 qun1 gai1 dou6	104,598	23.41
Shibi Subdistrict	石壁街道	Shíbì Jiēdào	ség6 big1 gai1 dou6	32,989	27.01
Dashi Subdistrict	大石街道	Dàshí Jiēdào	dai6 ség6 gai1 dou6	116,107	19.34
Luopu Subdistrict	洛浦街道	Luòpǔ Jiēdào	log6 pou2 gai1 dou6	89,294	25.38
Dalong Subdistrict	大龙街道	Dàlóng Jiēdào	dai6 lung4 gai1 dou6	129,515	24.80
Donghuan Subdistrict	东环街道	Dōnghuán Jiēdào	dung1 wan4 gai1 dou6	52,965	11.00
Qiaonan Subdistrict	桥南街道	Qiáonán Jiēdào	kiu4 nam4 gai1 dou6	72,695	17.85
Shatou Subdistrict	沙头街道	Shātóu Jiēdào	sa1 teo4 gai1 dou6	35,201	18.10
Xiaoguwei Subdistrict	小谷围街道	Xiǎogǔwéi Jiēdào	xiu2 gug1 wei4 gai1 dou6	131,470	20.15
Nancun town	南村镇	Náncūn Zhèn	nam4 qun1 zan3	129,076	47.00
Xinzao town	新造镇	Xīnzào Zhèn	sen1 lung4 zou6 zan3	27,248	14.12
Hualong town	化龙镇	Huàlóng Zhèn	fa3 lung4 zan3	53,142	55.70
Shilou town	石楼镇	Shílóu Zhèn	ség6 leo4 zan3	90,381	126.50
Shiqi town	石碁镇	Shíqí Zhèn	ség6 gei1 zen3	97,434	71.26
Shawan town	沙湾镇	Shāwān Zhèn	saa1 waan1 zan3	88,695	37.45

=== Transfer Towns ===
The following towns have been abolished, some by absorption into the Development zone of the Nansha District.

- Lianhuashan (莲花山镇), named after Lianhuashan Hill
- Xinken (新垦镇)
- Tanzhou (潭洲镇)
- Yuwotou (鱼窝头镇)
- Huangge (黄阁镇)
- Hengli (横沥镇)
- Wanqingsha (万顷沙镇)
- Dongchong (东涌镇)
- Dagang (大岗镇)
- Lanhe (榄核镇)

=== Villages ===
Under its various Subdistricts and Towns (and in the one Development zone), Panyu has 305 administration villages (行政村) - i.e. 305 village governments.

There are other 'natural villages' (自然村) which administratively count as being in one or another of the administration villages.

== Climate ==
Climate data for Panyu, elevation 67 m (220 ft), (1991–2020 normals, extremes 1959–2020)
Month	Jan	Feb	Mar	Apr	May	Jun	Jul	Aug	Sep	Oct	Nov	Dec	Year
Record high °C (°F)	28.8 (83.8)	30.3 (86.5)	32.2 (90.0)	35.6 (96.1)	37.2 (99.0)	38.3 (100.9)	39.2 (102.6)	39.7 (103.5)	37.5 (99.5)	36.0 (96.8)	32.7 (90.9)	30.4 (86.7)	39.7 (103.5)
Mean daily maximum °C (°F)	19.0 (66.2)	20.3 (68.5)	22.7 (72.9)	26.8 (80.2)	30.4 (86.7)	32.3 (90.1)	33.5 (92.3)	33.4 (92.1)	32.3 (90.1)	29.6 (85.3)	25.6 (78.1)	21.0 (69.8)	27.2 (81.0)
Daily mean °C (°F)	14.6 (58.3)	16.1 (61.0)	18.9 (66.0)	23.0 (73.4)	26.4 (79.5)	28.4 (83.1)	29.3 (84.7)	29.2 (84.6)	28.1 (82.6)	25.3 (77.5)	21.0 (69.8)	16.3 (61.3)	23.1 (73.5)
Mean daily minimum °C (°F)	11.5 (52.7)	13.3 (55.9)	16.2 (61.2)	20.3 (68.5)	23.6 (74.5)	25.6 (78.1)	26.3 (79.3)	26.2 (79.2)	25.1 (77.2)	22.0 (71.6)	17.7 (63.9)	12.9 (55.2)	20.1 (68.1)
Record low °C (°F)	−0.4 (31.3)	2.7 (36.9)	3.0 (37.4)	9.1 (48.4)	15.2 (59.4)	17.8 (64.0)	21.6 (70.9)	22.1 (71.8)	16.5 (61.7)	10.2 (50.4)	5.2 (41.4)	1.1 (34.0)	−0.4 (31.3)
Average precipitation mm (inches)	49.7 (1.96)	49.3 (1.94)	89.8 (3.54)	182.9 (7.20)	275.2 (10.83)	310.9 (12.24)	221.4 (8.72)	251.1 (9.89)	178.6 (7.03)	68.1 (2.68)	40.5 (1.59)	34.6 (1.36)	1,752.1 (68.98)
Average precipitation days (≥ 0.1 mm)	7.1	9.5	14.2	15.1	17.7	18.8	16.7	17.0	12.4	5.7	5.8	5.6	145.6
Average relative humidity (%)	71	76	80	81	81	82	79	79	75	68	68	66	76
Mean monthly sunshine hours	107.4	80.2	63.3	80.2	119.1	139.7	182.1	166.1	157.6	174.6	152.1	137.1	1,559.5
Percentage possible sunshine	32	25	17	21	29	35	44	42	43	49	46	41	35
Source: China Meteorological Administrationall-time extreme low

== Economy ==
Statistics shows that in the year 1998, the GDP in the district was 33.25 billion yuan, an increase of 13% over the previous year, and the GDP per capita was 35.5 thousand Yuan, an increase of 11% compared with the previous year.

The amusement park operator Chimelong has its headquarters on the grounds of Chimelong Paradise in the district.

== Transportation ==
Guangzhou Metro Lines 2 and 3 serve parts of Panyu District. Line 2 was extended into the district in September 2010. Guangzhou South railway station, the main high-speed railway station serving Guangzhou, is situated within the boundaries of Panyu District.

Panyu Public Transport operates buses in the district.

=== Metro ===
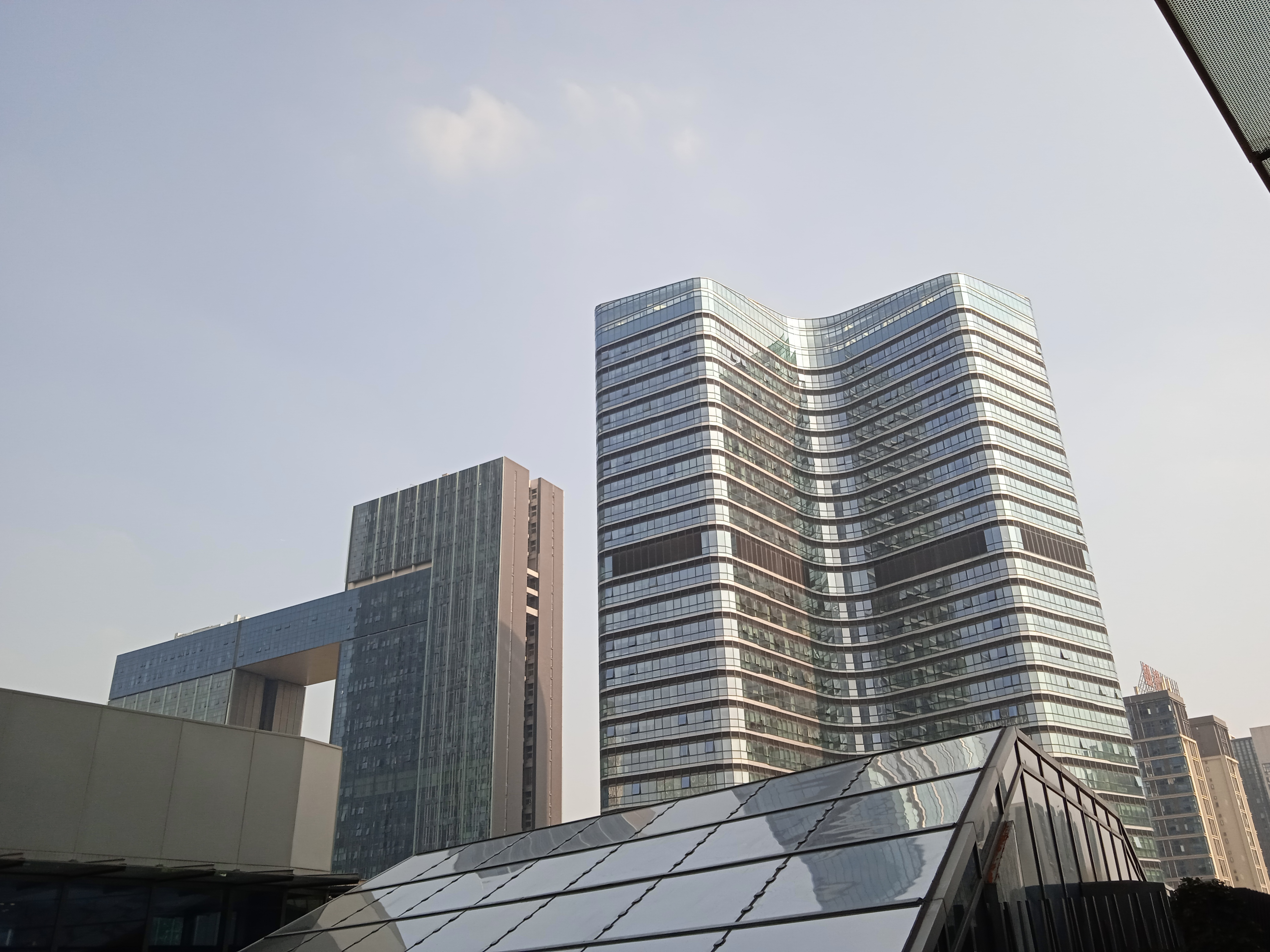
Nancun Wanbo Business Area

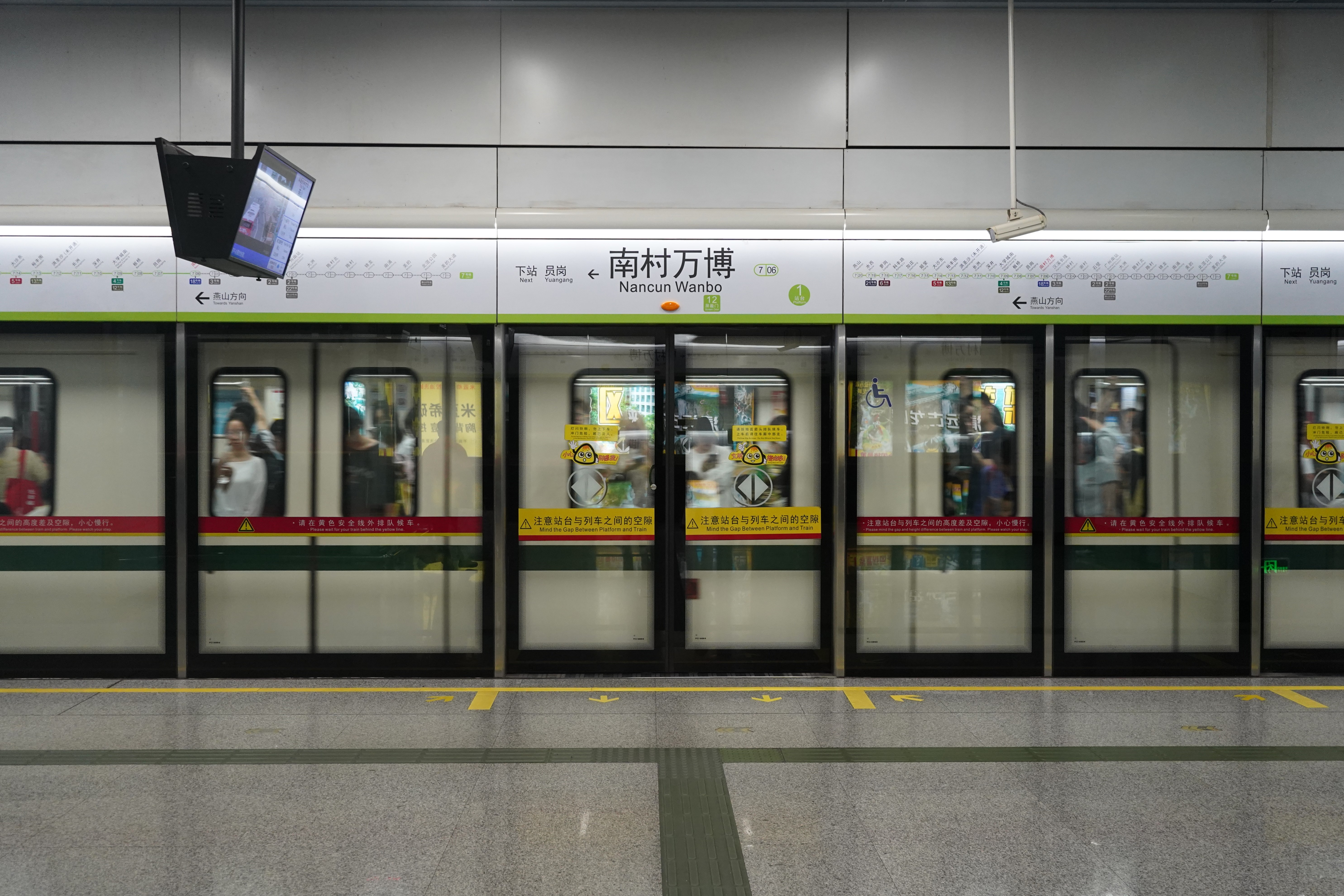
Nancun Wanbo metro station, Line 7

Panyu is currently serviced by seven metro lines operated by Guangzhou Metro:

- Line 2 - Luoxi, Nanpu, Huijiang, Shibi ( 7 ), Guangzhou South Station ( 7 22 ) ( 2 )
- Line 3 - Xiajiao, Dashi, Hanxi Changlong ( 7 ), Shiqiao, Panyu Square, Bangjiang, Shiqinan, Haichong Lu, Haibang ( 4 )
- Line 4 - Higher Education Mega Center North ( 12 ), Higher Education Mega Center South ( 7 , 12 ), Xinzao, Guanqiao (not open), Shiqi, Haibang ( 3 ), Dichong
- Line 7 - Guangzhou South Station ( 2 ), Shibi ( 2 ), Xiecun, Zhongcun, Hanxi Changlong ( 3 ), Nancun Wanbo ( 18 ), Yuangang, Banqiao, Higher Education Mega Center South ( 4 , 12 )
- Line 12 - Higher Education Mega Center North ( 4 ), Higher Education Mega Center South ( 4 , 7 )
- Line 18 - Shaxi, Nancun Wanbo ( 7 ), Panyu Square ( 3 22 )
- Line 22 - Panyu Square ( 3 18 ), Shiguanglu, Guangzhou South Railway Station ( 2 7 ) ( 2 ), Chentougang, Nanpu West

== Tourist attractions ==
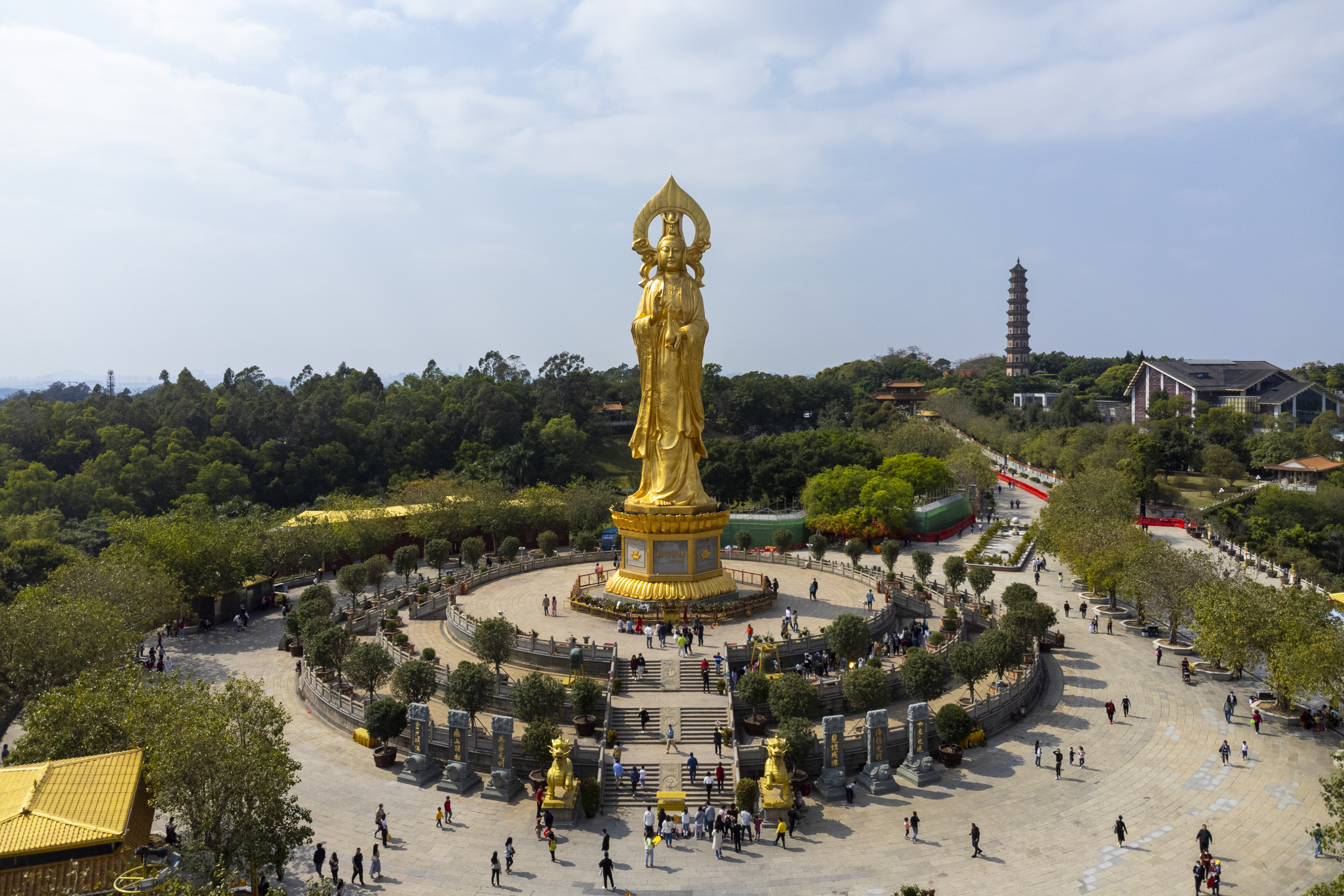
Lotus Hill

- Yuyin Mount Garden: One of the four famous gardens in Guangdong Province in the Qing dynasty.
- Baomo Garden
- Lotus Hill
- Changlong Night Zoo
- Xiangjiang Wildlife World
- Chime-Long Paradise
- Shawan Ancient Town

== Major educational institutions ==
The Guangzhou Higher Education Mega Center includes more than ten higher education institutions.

Schools for Chinese students:

- Guangdong Zhongyuan High School
- Nord Anglia School Guangzhou Panyu

International schools:

- Canadian International School of Guangzhou
- Guangzhou Korea School
- Clifford International School

== Notable individuals ==
People born in or with family links to the Panyu District:

- Xian Xinghai
- Deng Shichang
- Wang Jingwei
- Guan Liang
- Henry Fok
- Wong Jim
- Patrick Tse
- Nicholas Tse
- Francis Ng
- Sandra Ng
- Lawrence Ng
- Nick Cheung Ka Fai
- Edmund Ho
- Frankie Lam
- Hu Hanmin
- Selina Chow
- Michael Hui
- Samuel Hui
- Ricky Hui
- Shih Kien
- Chen Zhizhao
- Charles Sew Hoy

== International Relations ==
Panyu has a cooperational agreement with:

- Aveiro, Portugal
- Prague 5, Czech Republic

== See also ==
- Hung Shing
