= Nanpu station =

Guangzhou Metro station

Coordinates: 23.03359°N 113.29352°E

Nanpu 南浦
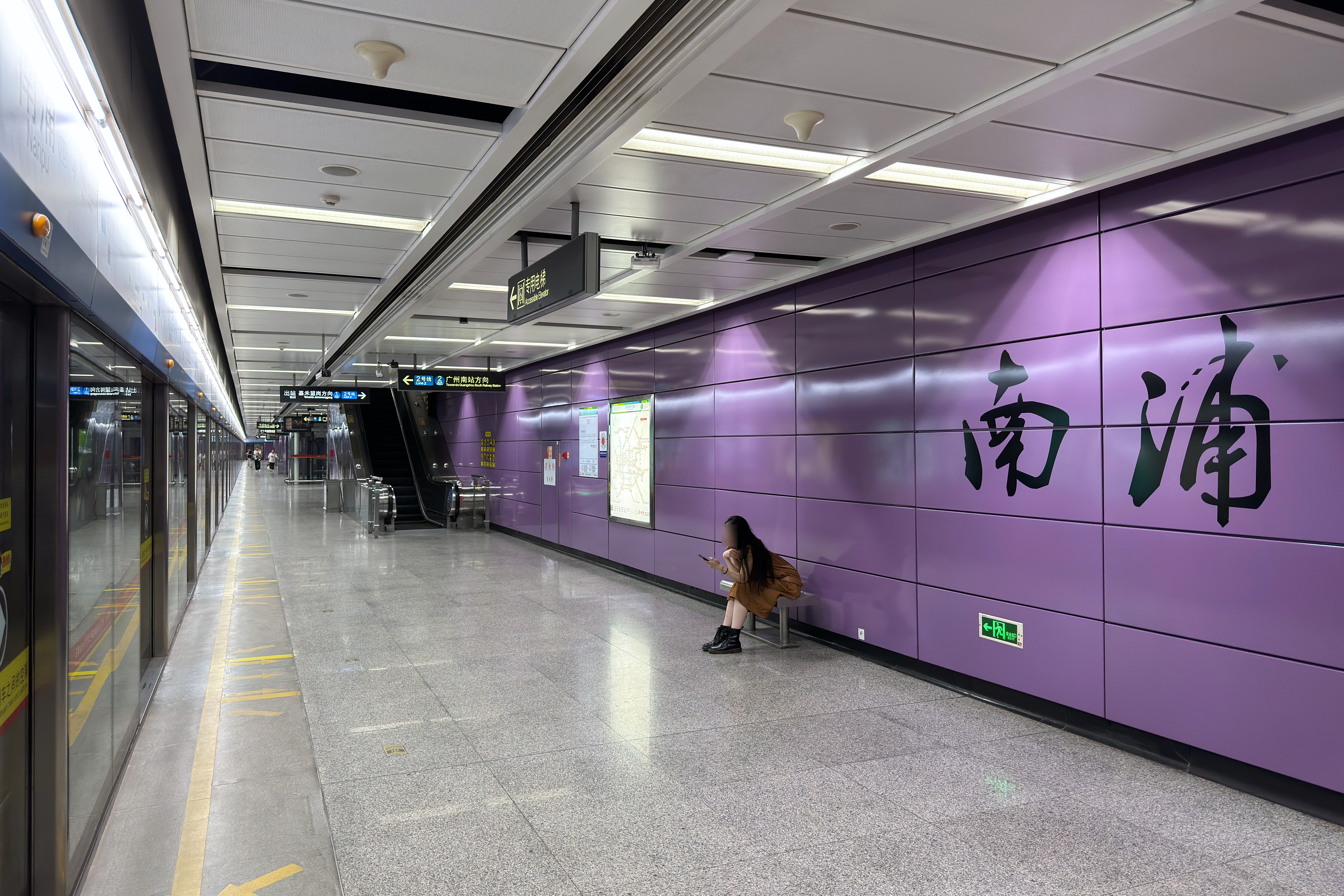

Chinese name
- Chinese: 南浦站
Transcriptions
Standard Mandarin
- Hanyu Pinyin: Nánpǔ Zhàn
Yue: Cantonese
- Yale Romanization: Nàahmpóu Jaahm
- Jyutping: Naam4pou2 Zaam6
- Hong Kong Romanization: Nam Po station

General information
- Location: Nanpu Island, Panyu District, Guangzhou, Guangdong; China
- Operated by: Guangzhou Metro Co. Ltd.
- Line: Line 2
- Platforms: 3 (1 island platform 1 side platform)

Construction
- Structure type: Underground

Other information
- Station code: 204

History
- Opened: 25 September 2010; 15 years ago

Services
Preceding station	Guangzhou Metro	Following station
Huijiang towards Guangzhou South Railway Station	Line 2	Luoxi towards Jiahewanggang
Location

Nanpu Station (Chinese: 南浦站; Jyutping: naam4 pou2 zaam6; Cantonese Yale: Nàahmpóu Jaahm) is a metro station on Line 2 of the Guangzhou Metro. The underground station is located in Bigui Avenue (碧桂大道), Nanpu Island in the Panyu District of Guangzhou near the Guangzhou Country Garden.

== Station layout ==
G	Street level	Exits (4)
L1; Concourse	lobby	Customer Service, Shops, Vending machines, ATMs
L2; Platforms	Platform 1	2 towards Jiahewanggang (Luoxi)
L2; Platforms	Island platform, doors will open on the left
L2; Platforms	Platform	No regular service
L2; Platforms	Platform 2	2 towards Guangzhou South Railway Station (Huijiang)
L2; Platforms	Side platform, doors will open on the right

== Neighboring Buildings ==
- Guangzhou Country Garden
- Guangzhou Bailong Bay
