= Canadian International School of Guangzhou =

School in Guangzhou, China

- 广州市加拿大外籍人员子女学校

- Main entrance to the school

Location
- 122 Dongyi Road, Panyu District; Guangzhou, Guangdong, 511400; China; 22.97844°N 113.33951°E

Information
- Type: Private international school
- Established: 2012
- Principal: Joanna Yi
- Head of school: Dean Croy
- Grades: Early childhood–Grade 12
- Language: English
- Accreditation: Alberta Education; International Baccalaureate
- Affiliation: Canadian International Educational Organization
- Website: cisgz.com

Canadian International School of Guangzhou
- Simplified Chinese: 广州市加拿大外籍人员子女学校
- Traditional Chinese: 廣州市加拿大外籍人員子女學校
Transcriptions
Standard Mandarin
- Hanyu Pinyin: Guǎngzhōushì Jiānádà Wàijí Rényuán Zǐnǚ Xuéxiào
Yue: Cantonese
- Jyutping: gwong2 zau1 si5 gaa1 naa4 daai6 ngoi6 zik6 jan4 jyun4 zi2 neoi5 hok6 haau6

Canadian International School of Guangzhou (CIS-GZ; Chinese: 广州市加拿大外籍人员子女学校) is a Canadian international school (for children of foreign workers) in Panyu District, Guangzhou, Guangdong, China. Its serves students from kindergarten through grade 12. CIS-GZ the curriculum of Alberta, Canada.

Its current campus has 150 dormitories, and can accommodate up to 1,000 students. Alberta, Canada, accredited the school, which is administered under the shared supervision of the governments of China and Canada.

== Student body ==
The school admits students with foreign, Hong Kong, Macau, and Republic of China (Taiwan) passports. The following neighborhoods frequently send students to CIS-GZ: Agile, Cambridge Shire, Clifford, Global Villas, Merchant Hill, South China Country Garden, and Star River Phase.

In 2019, the school had over 500 students and teachers who come from more than 40 countries.

== Gallery ==
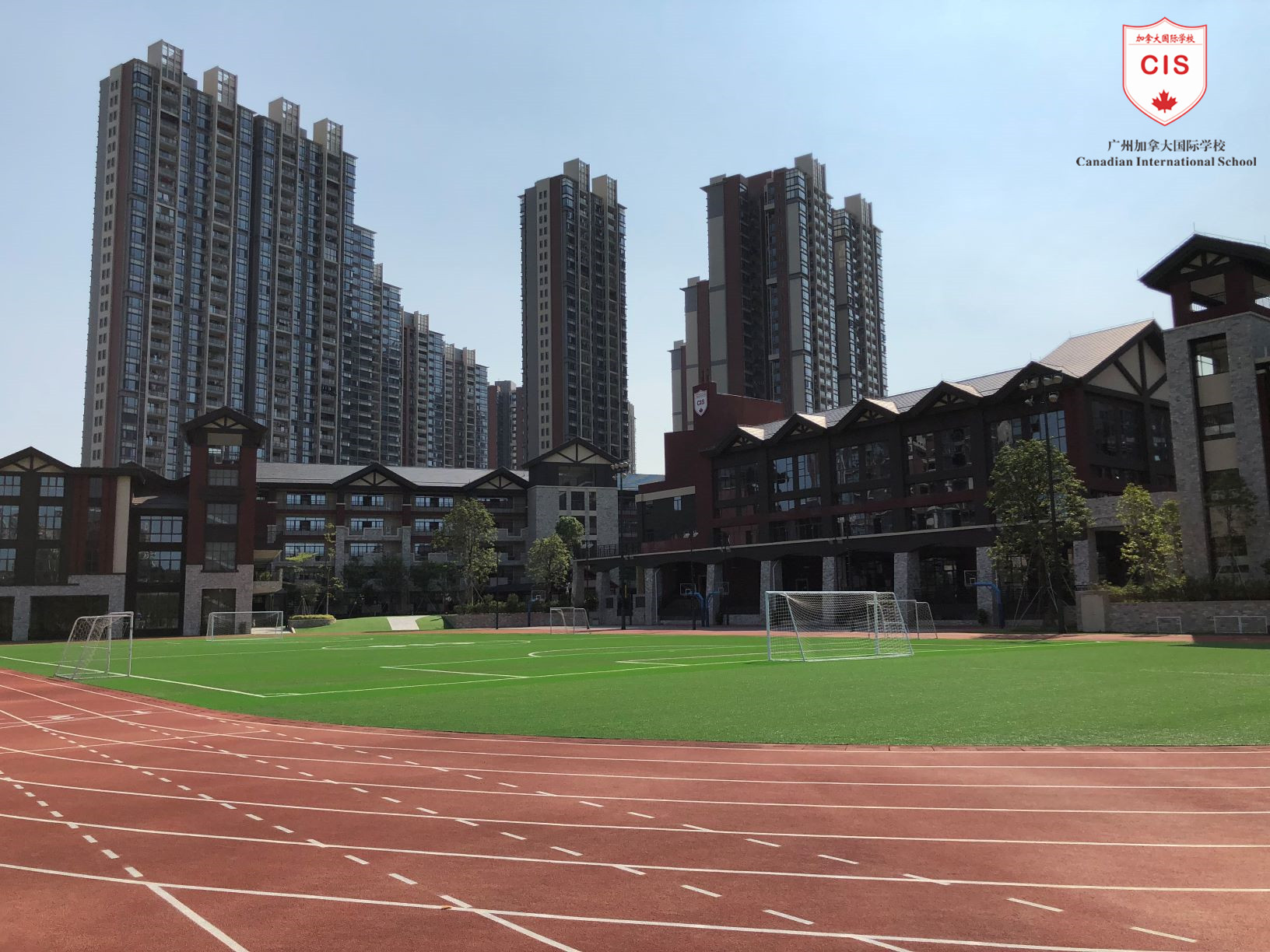
Interior view

Football field

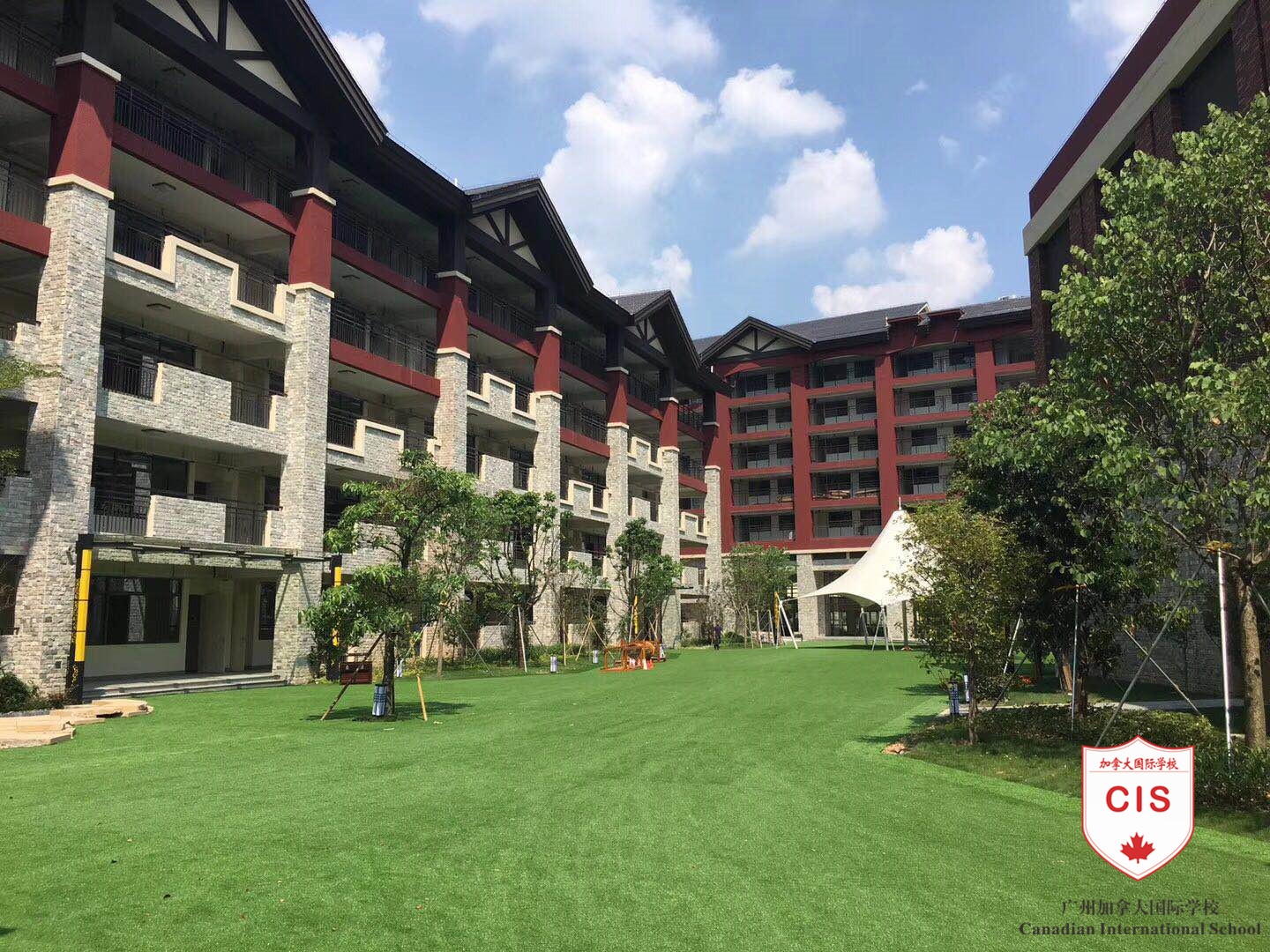
Teaching building

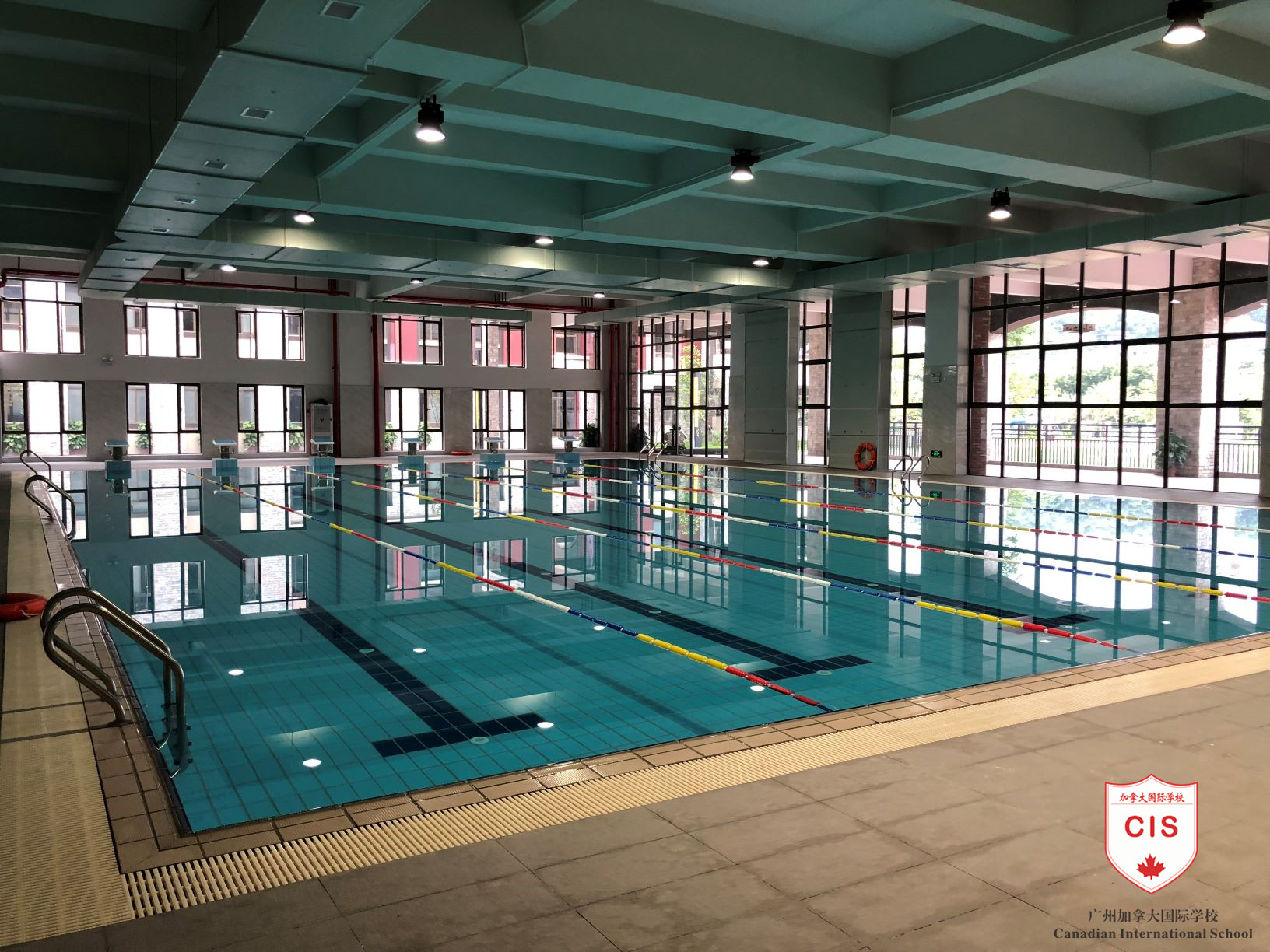
Indoor swimming pool

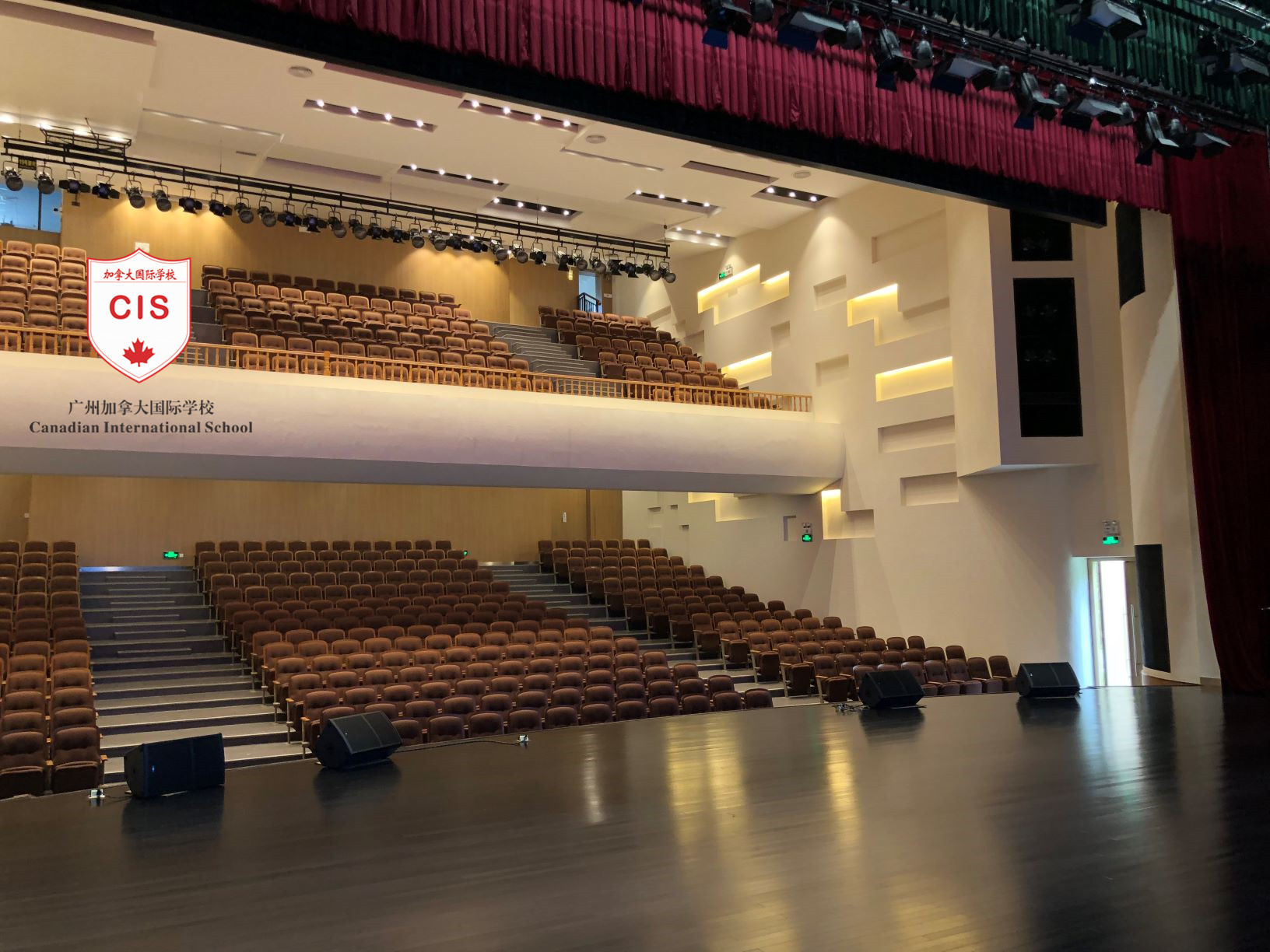
Auditorium
