= Clifford International School =

Coordinates: 22.96383°N 113.33082°E

- 广州番禺祈福英语实验学校
- Clifford Estates, Panyu, Guangzhou, Guangdong; China

Information
- Type: International
- Motto: Face the World, Face the Future
- Established: 2002
- Faculty: 50+
- Grades: K-12
- Enrollment: 500+
- Mascot: Cougars
- Curriculum: Canadian
- Website: www.cliffordschool.org

Clifford International School (CIS; Chinese: 广州番禺祈福英语实验学校) is an international school located in Guangzhou, China. The school follows the Canadian curriculum, or, more precisely, the Manitoba study programs. CIS students are taught in English, and they also have Mandarin lessons once a day.

The student body is made up of approximately 550 students from over 22 countries and regions. CIS's teaching staff consists of 45 Canadian certified teachers, eight Chinese teachers, and qualified teaching assistants.

== History ==
Clifford School was founded in 1996, with the Clifford International School following in 2002. Clifford School began as a fully Chinese local private school with Mandarin Chinese as the medium of instruction; however, western staff was present to teach English language classes as well.

An international program was established in 2002 to provide full English as the language medium for courses, with the goal of attracting expatriate families and foreign students living in Guangzhou, China. Clifford School's international program gradually separated from the rest of the school. Clifford International School now has its own principals, governing body, and student council that are completely separate from Clifford School.

== Academic accreditation ==
CIS was first accredited by the Commission on International and Trans-Regional Accreditation (CITA) in 2001 and again in 2006. The school is also registered with the Chinese government as a School for Foreign Students.

Clifford International School is also accredited by the Chinese Educational Authority and received accreditation from the United States authorities with NCA. This accreditation acknowledges that Clifford International School meets the common measure of an appropriate learning environment with proven academic standards.

Students graduating from the school also receive a Manitoba High School Diploma.

== Curriculum ==
=== High school ===
CIS follows the Manitoba Department of Education's curriculum. English, chemistry, physics, biology, arithmetic, history, world issues, French or Mandarin, physical education, and electives are among the subjects taught at CIS in preparation for university admission. An academic year has 190 teaching days, 320 teaching minutes per day, and a full credit class receives 120 hours of instruction. All students are required to take two Manitoba external examinations: mathematics (pre-calculus or applied mathematics) and English.

Clifford School also has a program for Advanced Placement (AP). AP Calculus AB, AP Psychology, AP Economics, AP Chinese Language and Culture, and AP Statistics are among the courses available. Students can take the AP exam at school in May. Clifford School is also an official SAT Writing Center. Clifford School has special permission to administer the SAT exams on campus to students who are registered there.

== Alumni network ==
Clifford Alumni (CA) is the alumni association for Clifford. It has been managed by the Clifford Alumni Secretariat (CAS) since its inception in October 2016. The following people are currently members of the CAS: C. A. Nie, A. Fang, D. Tang, M. Huang, and J. Zhang Qiu.

== Current administration ==
Members of staff as of 3 March 2026

- Principals: Mr. Matthew Brown, Mr. Yvan Zebroff
- Dean Of Curriculum: Ms. Amanda-Lee Friesen
- Dean Of Students: Dr. Terry Kurtz
