= Luoxi station =

Guangzhou Metro station

Coordinates: 23.04321°N 113.29872°E

Luoxi 洛溪
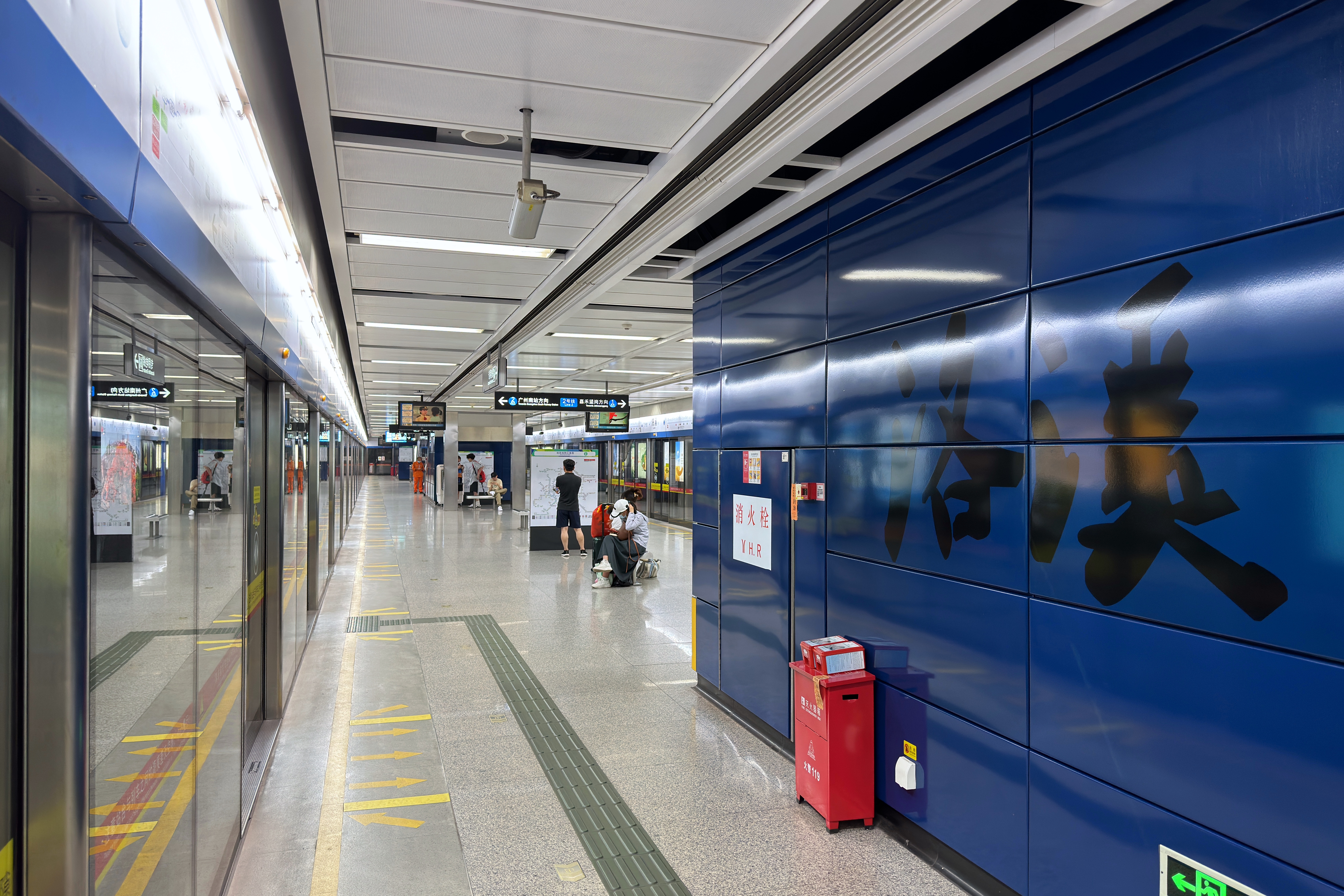

Chinese name
- Chinese: 洛溪站
Transcriptions
Standard Mandarin
- Hanyu Pinyin: Luòxī Zhàn
Yue: Cantonese
- Yale Romanization: Lohkkāi Jaahm
- Jyutping: Lok6kai1 Zaam6
- Hong Kong Romanization: Lok Kai station

General information
- Location: Luoxi Island, Panyu District, Guangzhou, Guangdong; China
- Operated by: Guangzhou Metro Co. Ltd.
- Line: Line 2
- Platforms: 2 (1 island platform)

Construction
- Structure type: Underground

Other information
- Station code: 205

History
- Opened: 25 September 2010; 15 years ago

Services
Preceding station	Guangzhou Metro	Following station
Nanpu towards Guangzhou South Railway Station	Line 2	Nanzhou towards Jiahewanggang
Location

Luoxi Station (Chinese: 洛溪站; Jyutping: lok6 kai1 zaam6; Cantonese Yale: Lohkkāi Jaahm) is a metro station on Line 2 of the Guangzhou Metro. The underground station is located in Xinpu Road (新浦路), Luoxi Island in the Panyu District of Guangzhou.

== Neighboring Building ==
- Luoxi New Town
