= Guangzhou Korean School =

South Korean school in Guangzhou, China

Guangzhou Korean School 광저우한국학교 广州韩国学校

Location
- No.6, Xinghai Road, Shilou Town, Panyu District, Guangzhou, Guangdong, China 511447 广东省广州市番禺区石楼镇兴海路6号; China
- Coordinates: 22.990095°N 113.34263099999998°E

Information
- Website: gks.or.kr

Guangzhou Korean School

Chinese name
- Simplified Chinese: 广州韩国学校
- Traditional Chinese: 廣州韓國學校
Transcriptions
Standard Mandarin
- Hanyu Pinyin: Guǎngzhōu Hánguó Xuéxiào
Yue: Cantonese
- Jyutping: gwong2 zau1 hon4 gwok3 hok6 haau6

Korean name
- Hangul: 광저우한국학교

Guangzhou Korean School (Chinese: 广州韩国学校, Korean: 광저우한국학교) is a South Korean international school in Shilou Town, Panyu District, Guangzhou.

Kim Jang-hwan, South Korea's consul general in Guangzhou, announced the opening of a Korean international school in Guangzhou in 2011. Because Panyu District was densely populated with Koreans, the school was planned to be located there. The Chinese Ministry of Education approved the school as a school for teaching foreigners on July 24, 2013.

== Location ==
It is in Shilou Town, Panyu District, Guangzhou.

It was formerly located within the Jinxiuxiangjiang Primary School (Note: simplified Chinese: 锦绣香江小学; traditional Chinese: 錦繡香江小學; pinyin: Jǐnxiùxiāngjiāng Xiǎoxué; Jyutping: gam2 sau3 hoeng1 gong1 siu2 hok6) in Jinxiuxiangjiang Apartment (Note: 锦绣香江小区; 錦繡香江小區; Jǐnxiùxiāngjiāng Xiǎoqū; gam2 sau3 hoeng1 gong1 siu2 keoi1) in Nancun Town (Note: 南村镇; 南村鎮; Náncūn zhèn; naam4 cyun1 zan3), Panyu District. At a later time it was located in Asian Games City (亚运城), Shilou Town.

== See also ==
- Koreans in China
