= Huijiang station =

Guangzhou Metro station

Coordinates: 23.0131°N 113.2863°E

Huijiang 会江
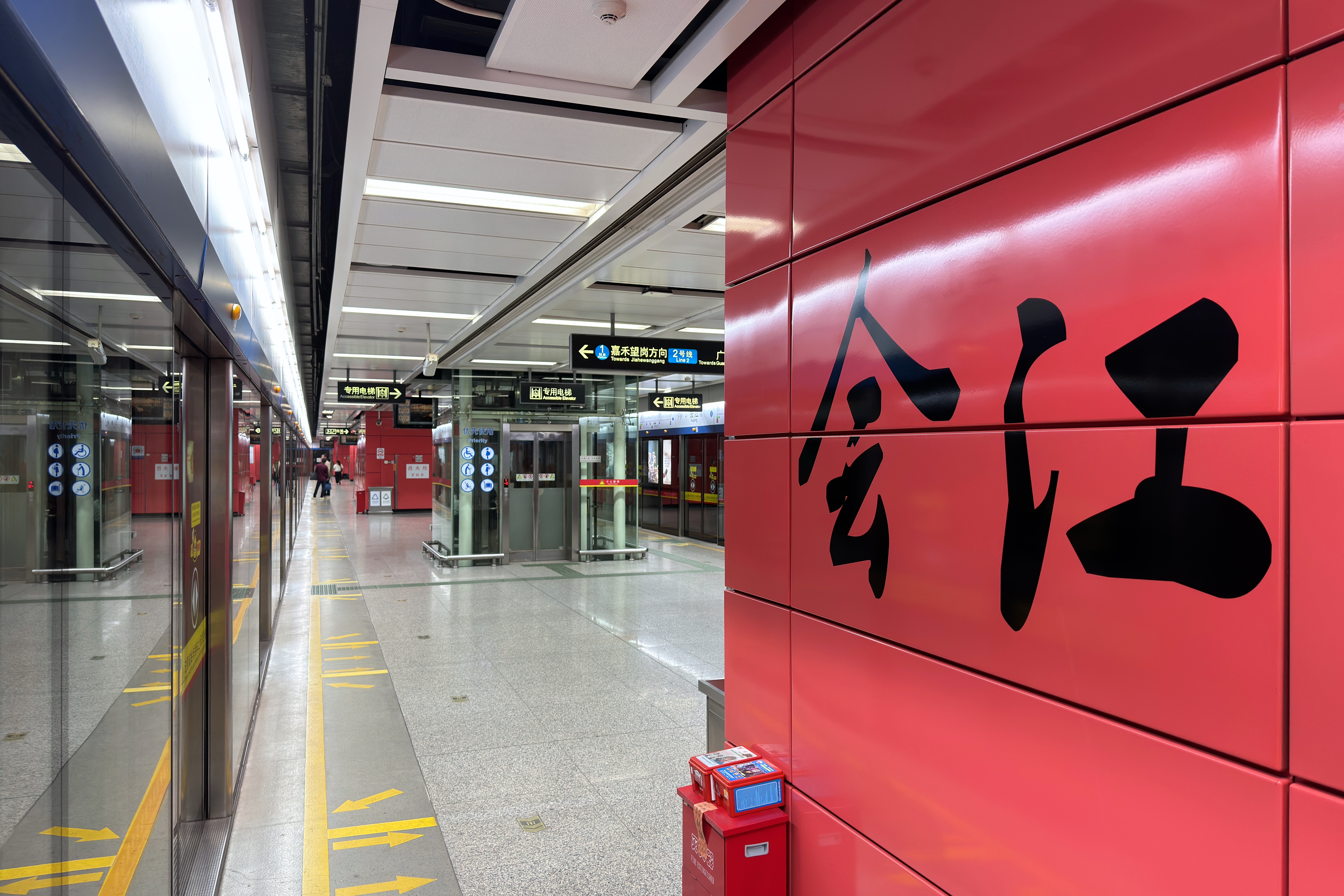

Chinese name
- Simplified Chinese: 会江站
- Traditional Chinese: 會江站
Transcriptions
Standard Mandarin
- Hanyu Pinyin: Huìjiāng Zhàn
Yue: Cantonese
- Jyutping: wui^{2}gong^{1} zaam^{6}
- Hong Kong Romanization: Wui Kong station

General information
- Location: Panyu District, Guangzhou, Guangdong; China
- Operator: Guangzhou Metro Co. Ltd.
- Line: Line 2
- Platforms: 2 (1 island platform)

Construction
- Structure type: Underground

Other information
- Station code: 203

History
- Opened: 25 September 2010; 16 years ago

Services
Preceding station	Guangzhou Metro	Following station
Shibi towards Guangzhou South Railway Station	Line 2	Nanpu towards Jiahewanggang
Location

Huijiang Station (simplified Chinese: 会江站; traditional Chinese: 會江站; Jyutping: wui6 gong1 zaam6; Cantonese Yale: Wuihgōng Jaahm) is a metro station on Line 2 of the Guangzhou Metro located under the junction of Shibei Avenue (石北大道) and Shizhong Second Road (石中二路) in the Panyu District of Guangzhou.

== Neighboring building ==
- Huijiang Industrial Zone
