= Lotus Hill =

Hill in Guangzhou, China

Coordinates: 22.9789°N 113.5045°E

Lianhua Hill (Lotus Hill)
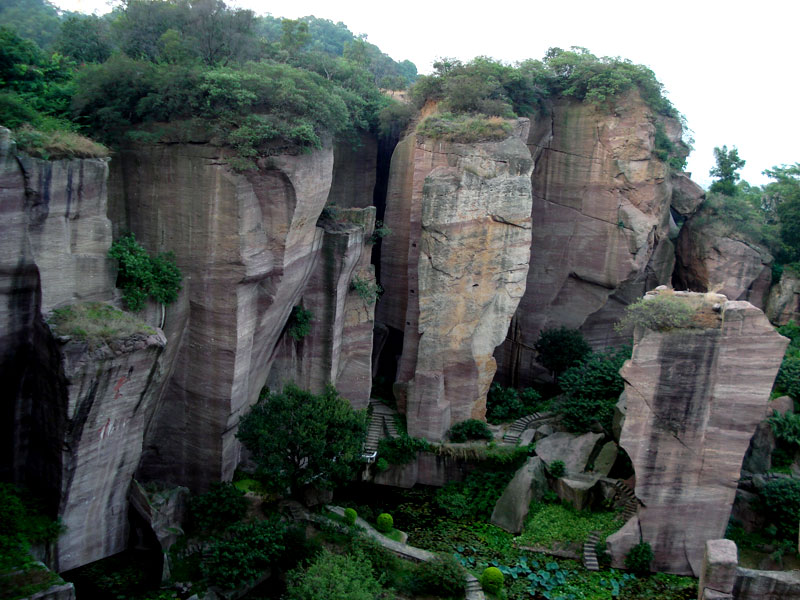
- The Western Han dynasty quarries in Lotus Hill
- Simplified Chinese: 莲花山
- Traditional Chinese: 蓮花山
- Postal: Linfa Hill
Transcriptions
Standard Mandarin
- Hanyu Pinyin: Liánhuā Shān
- Wade–Giles: Lien^{2}-hua^{1} Shan^{1}
Yue: Cantonese
- Jyutping: lin4 faa1 saan1

Lotus Hill or Lianhuashan (Chinese: 莲花山; pinyin: Liánhuā Shān) is a hill in Panyu, Guangzhou, Guangdong, China, with Shizi Lake to the west. It covers an area of 2.33 square kilometres (0.90 sq mi) and has a peak 108 metres (354 ft) above sea level. It is 30 km (19 mi) from the city of Guangzhou proper and 60 nautical miles from Hong Kong. It is now a 4A-level national park.

The hill's name comes from the legend of a vicious dragon in the South Sea who raised winds and waves in the Pearl River estuary flooding lands and capsizing boats, causing the local people to suffer. Mother Buddha came by and was furious at the dragon's behavior. She threw her lotus on which she sat into the water, thus the evil dragon was brought under control and the lotus turned into a mountain many years later. Hence its name — Lotus Hill.

Lotus Hill is noted for its Western Han dynasty quarry which formed steep cliffs, alcoves, and other fantastic scenes.

There are two major activities in this area. One is the Lotus Festival which is celebrated annually from June to August. It is a grand gathering of lotus when more than 100 species are exhibited. The other is Peach Blossom Festival which is observed during the spring when the whole mountain is swathed in a blossom of pink flowers.
