= Shibi station =

Guangzhou Metro interchange station

Coordinates: 22.994136°N 113.277964°E

Shibi 石壁
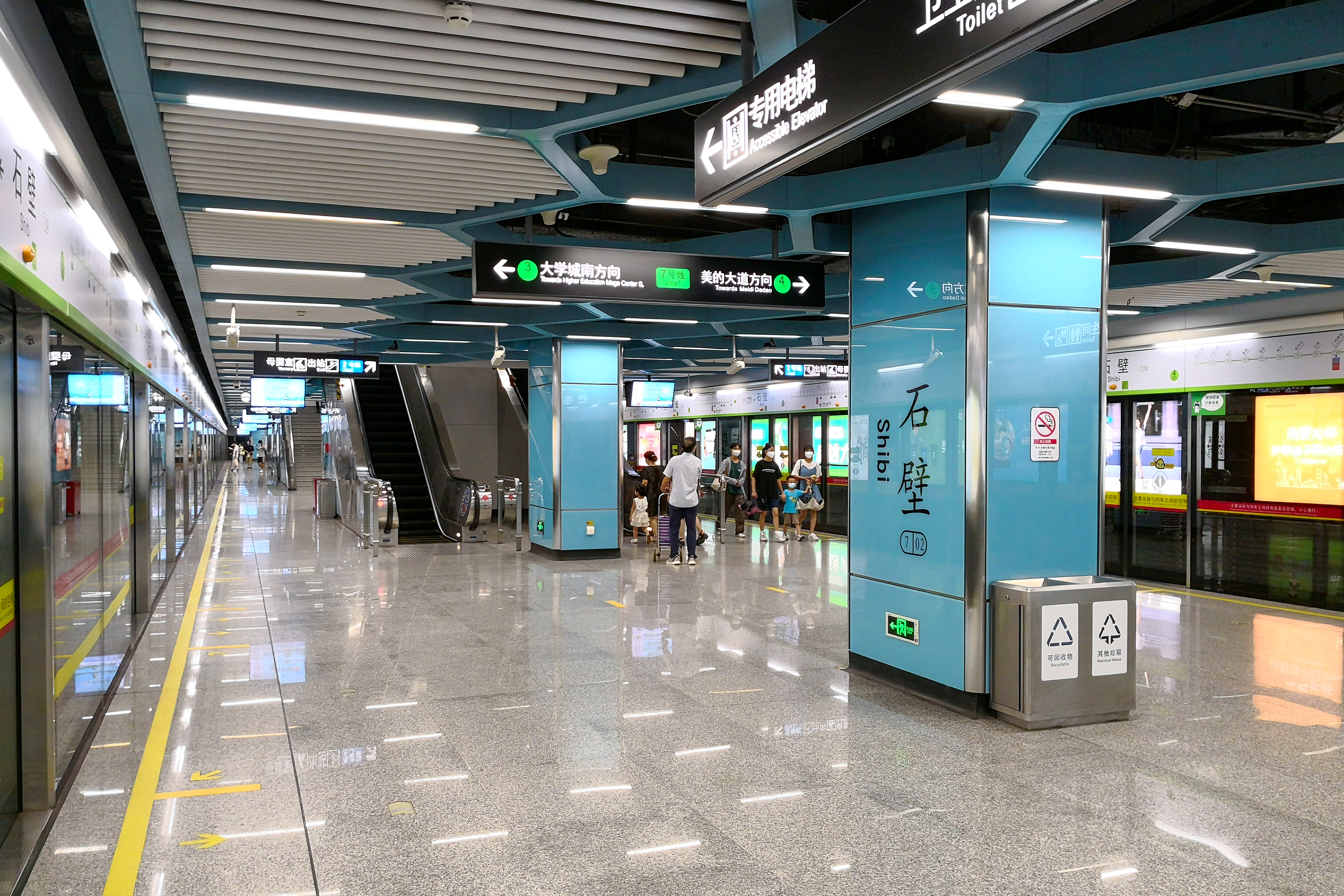
- Line 7 platform

Chinese name
- Chinese: 石壁站
Transcriptions
Standard Mandarin
- Hanyu Pinyin: Shíbì Zhàn
Yue: Cantonese
- Jyutping: sek^{6}bik^{1} zaam^{6}
- Hong Kong Romanization: Shek Pik station

General information
- Location: Panyu District, Guangzhou, Guangdong; China
- Operator: Guangzhou Metro Co. Ltd.
- Lines: Line 2 Line 7
- Platforms: 4 (2 island platforms)
- Tracks: 4

Construction
- Structure type: Underground
- Accessible: Yes

Other information
- Station code: 202 702

History
- Opened: Line 2: 25 September 2010; 16 years ago Line 7: 28 December 2016; 9 years ago

Services
Preceding station	Guangzhou Metro	Following station
Guangzhou South Railway Station Terminus	Line 2	Huijiang towards Jiahewanggang
Guangzhou South Railway Station towards Meidi Dadao	Line 7	Xiecun towards Yanshan
Location

Shibi Station (Chinese: 石壁站; Jyutping: sek^{6}bik^{1} zaam^{6}; Cantonese Yale: Sehkbīk Jaahm) is an interchange station between Line 2 and Line 7 of the Guangzhou Metro. The underground station is under Shibi Village (石壁村), Xiebian Highway (谢边公路), Panyu District, Guangzhou. It started operation on 25 September 2010.

== Station layout ==
G	Street level	Exits A-D
L1; Concourse	Line 2 Lobby	Ticket Machines, Customer Service, Shops, Police Station, Safety Facilities
L1; Concourse	Transfer passageway	Transfer passageway between Lines 2 & 7
L1; Concourse	Line 7 Lobby	Ticket Machines, Customer Service, Shops, Police Station, Safety Facilities
L2; Platforms	Platform 2	2 towards Guangzhou South Railway Station (Terminus)
L2; Platforms	Island platform, doors will open on the left
L2; Platforms	Platform 1	2 towards Jiahewanggang (Huijiang)
L2; Platforms	Platform 4	7 towards Meidi Dadao (Guangzhou South Railway Station)
L2; Platforms	Island platform, doors will open on the left
L2; Platforms	Platform 3	7 towards Yanshan (Xiecun)

== Exits ==
There are 4 exits, lettered A, B, C and D.

== Gallery ==
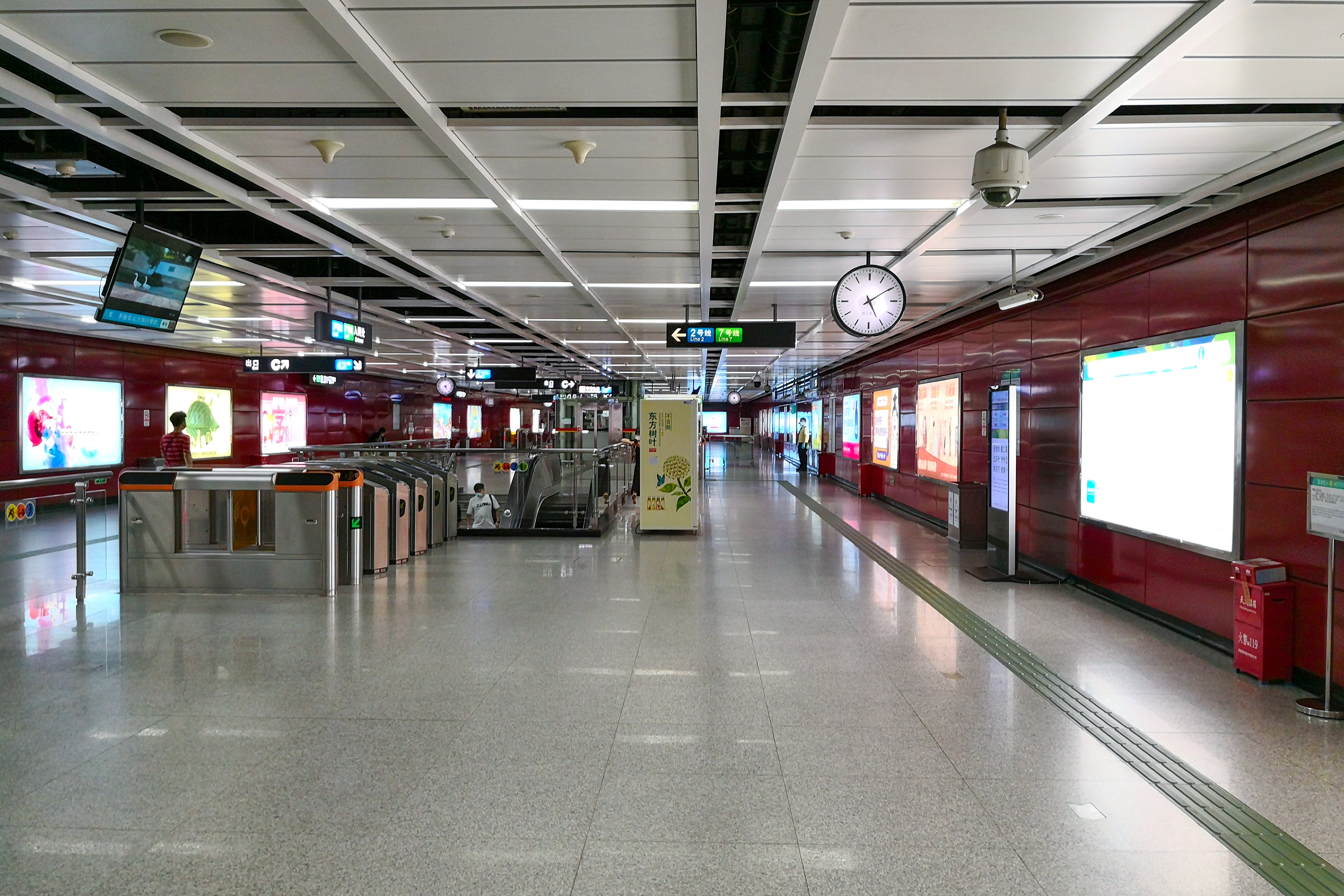
Line 2 concourse

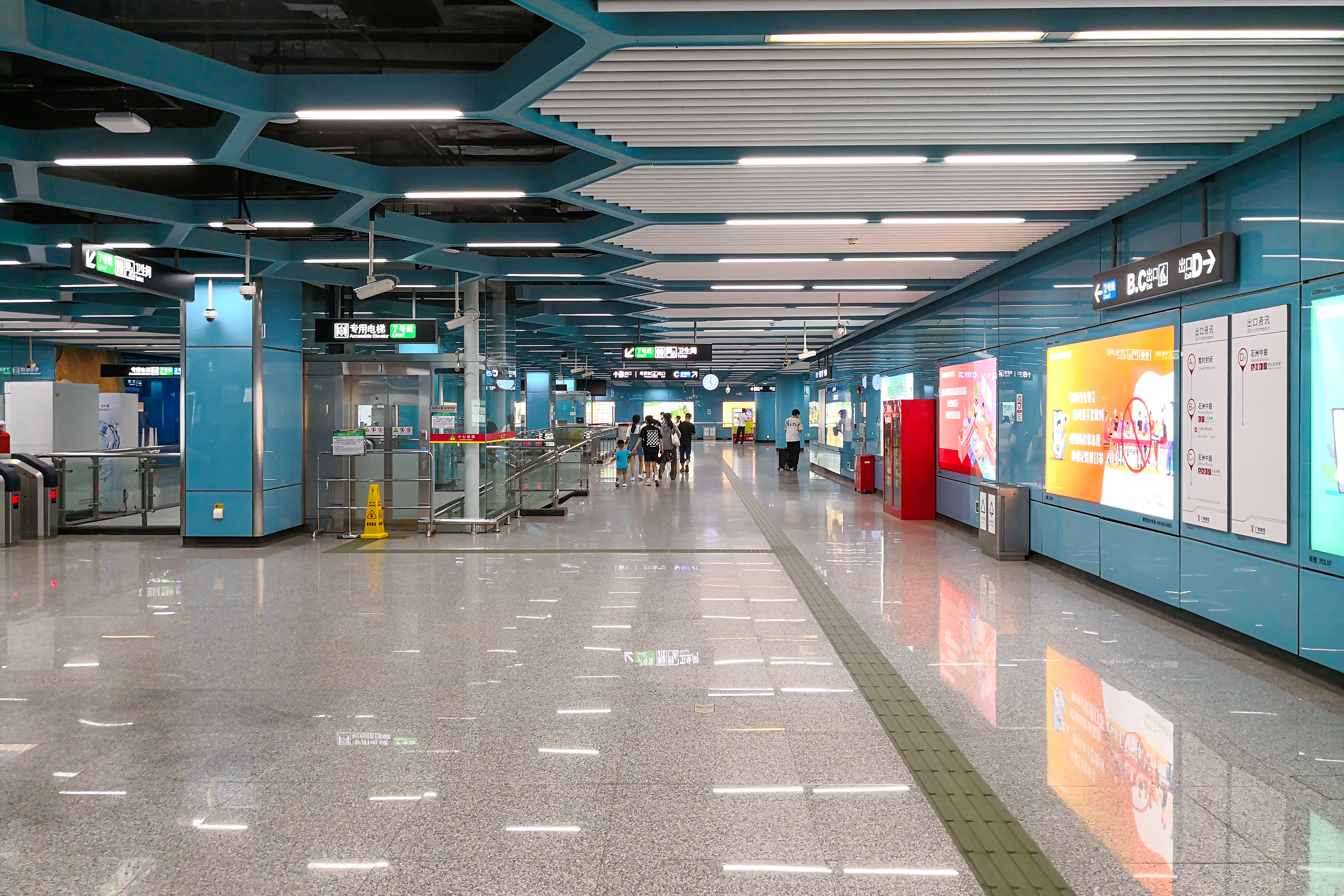
Line 7 concourse

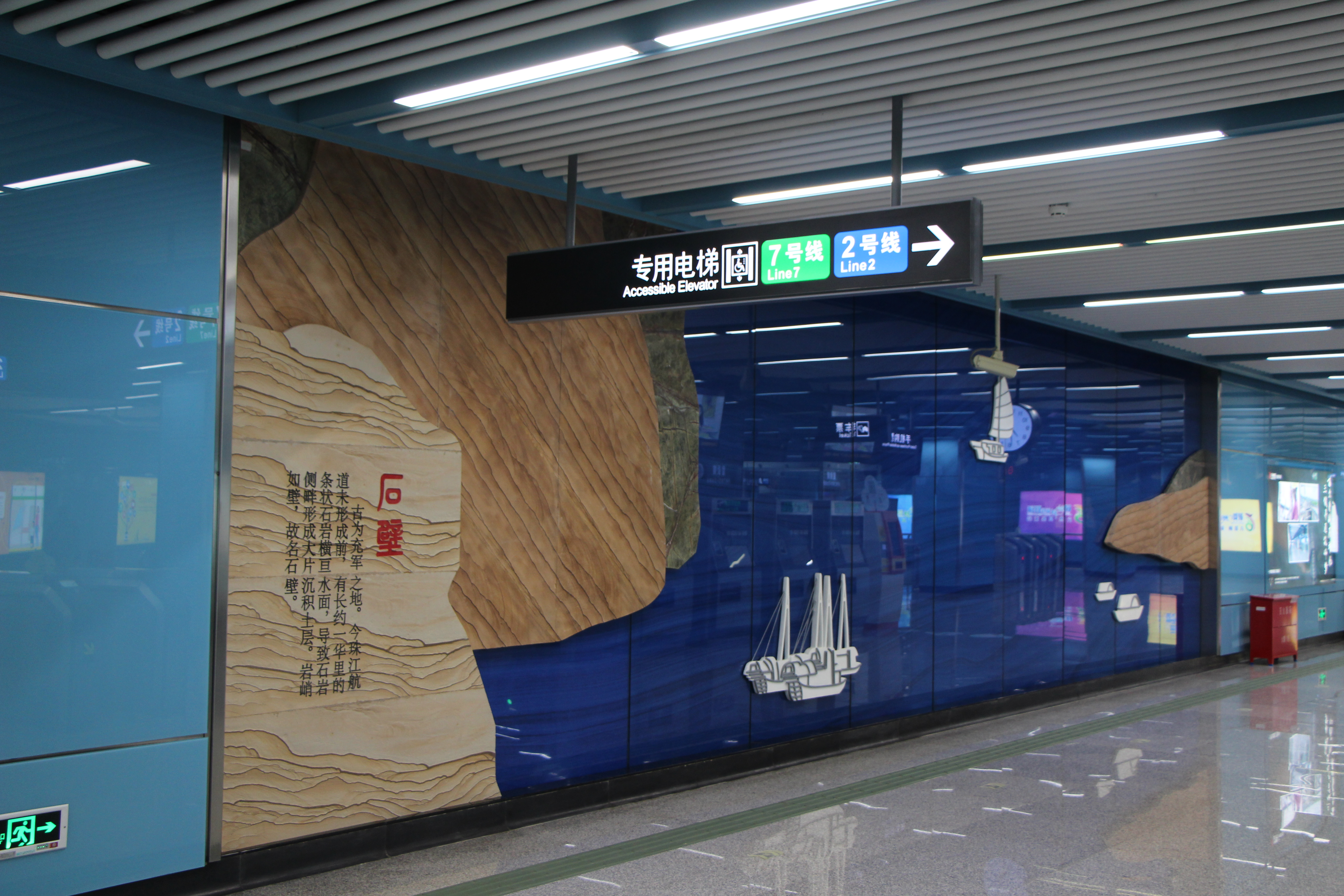
Line 7 concourse cultural wall

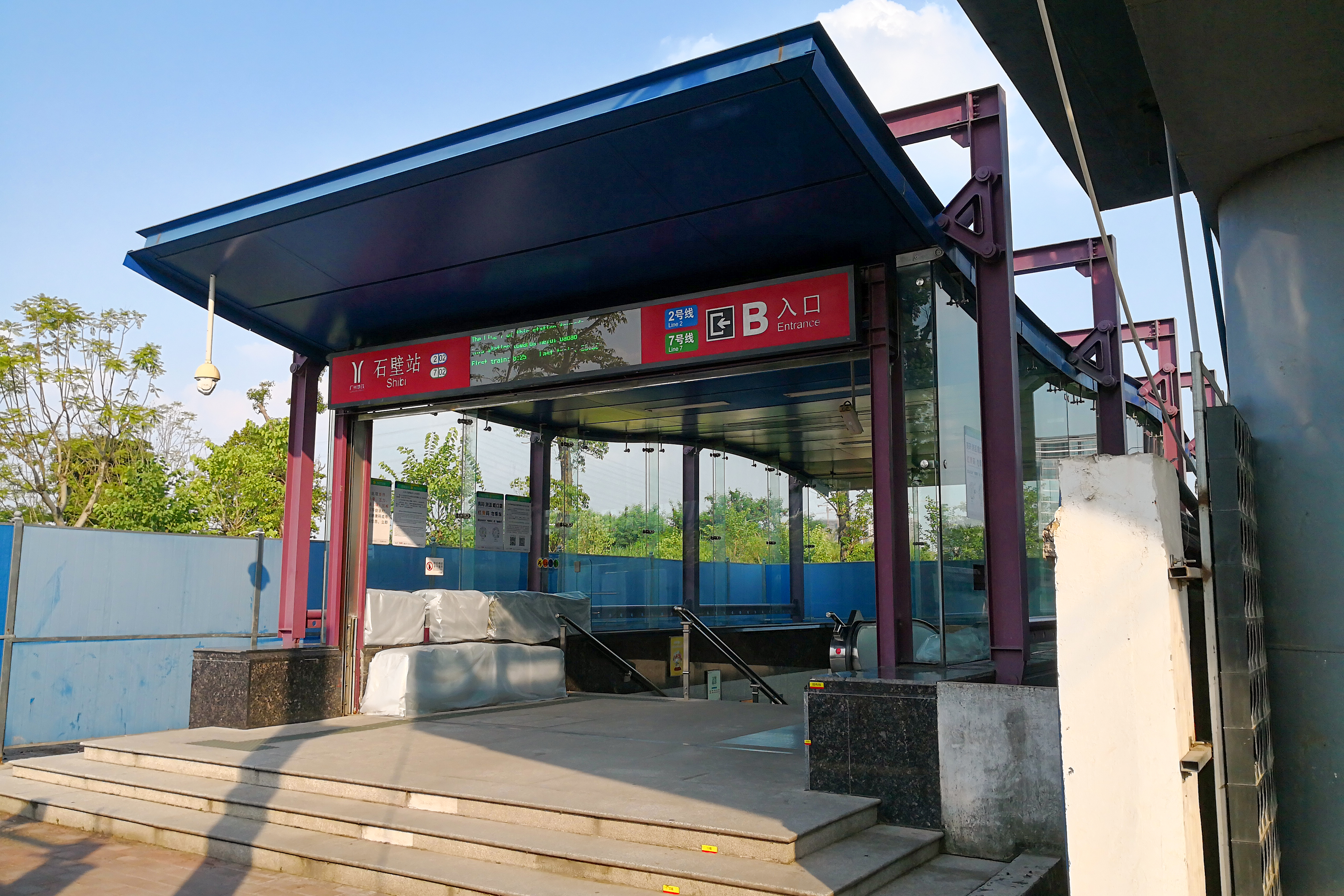
Exit B
