= Shiqiao Subdistrict, Guangzhou =

Subdistrict of Guangzhou, China

Coordinates: 22.9503°N 113.3612°E

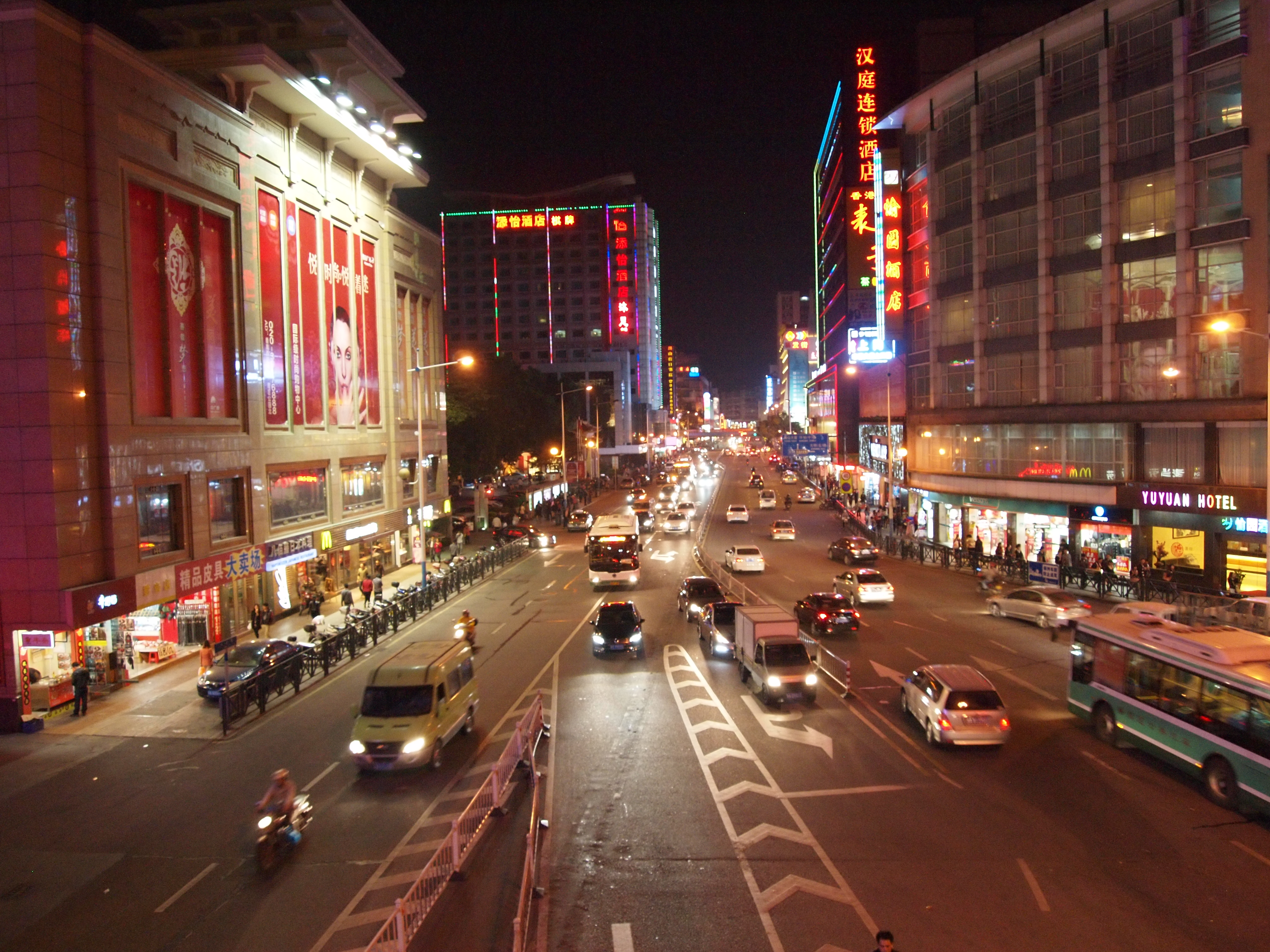
Commercial center of Shiqiao Subdistrict at night

Shiqiao (Chinese: 市桥; pinyin: Shìqíao), formerly romanized as Shi Kiu using Postal Romanization, is a Subdistrict of Panyu District, Guangzhou, Guangdong Province. It lies at the heart of Panyu, covers an area of 11.35 square km, and has a population of more than 280,000. Shiqiao is the political, economic, cultural and commercial centre of Panyu District, and has direct jurisdiction over 28 communities and 8 villages.
