= Panyu Public Transport =

Bus operator in Guangdong, China

Guangzhou Panyu Bus Co., Ltd.
- Simplified Chinese: 广州市番禺区公共汽车有限公司
- Traditional Chinese: 廣州市番禺區公共汽車有限公司
- Literal meaning: Guangzhou City Panyu District Bus Co, Ltd.
Transcriptions
Standard Mandarin
- Hanyu Pinyin: Guǎngzhōushì Pānyúqū Gōnggòngqìchē Yǒuxiàngōngsī
Yue: Cantonese
- Jyutping: gwong2 zau1 si5 pun1 jyu4 keoi1 gung1 gung6 hei3 ce1 jau5 haan6 gung1 si1

Panyu District Public Transport is a local bus operator in the Panyu District, Guangzhou, Guangdong province, China.

== Routes ==
There are 22 bus routes service nearby factories and residential complexes.

Popular routes include:

- Route 11
- Route 12
- Route 13

Routes will likely make connections with the Panyu Square station of the Guangzhou Metro Line 3, Line 18 and Line 22.

== Fleet ==
The operator uses aqua coloured Chinese built buses on the routes within Panyu District.

Panyu Public Transport operates a fleet of 180 buses. The buses consist of hard stainless steel seats with no air-conditioning or heating.

== Fares ==
Buses accepts cash (RMB) ranging from 1.5 to 3 yuan and a smart card system (2-3 yuan) similar to the Octopus Card used in Hong Kong.
