= Lanhe, Guangzhou =

Town in Guangdong, China

Lanhe 榄核镇
- Town
- Location in Guangdong
- Coordinates: 22°50′29″N 113°20′17″E
- Country: People's Republic of China
- Province: Guangdong
- Prefecture-level city: Guangzhou
- District: Nansha
- Time zone: UTC+8 (China Standard)

Lanhe (榄核镇) is a town in Nansha District, in the municipal region of Guangzhou, Guangdong, China.
