= Xiecun station =

Guangzhou Metro station

Coordinates: 22.990579°N 113.295832°E

Xiecun 谢村
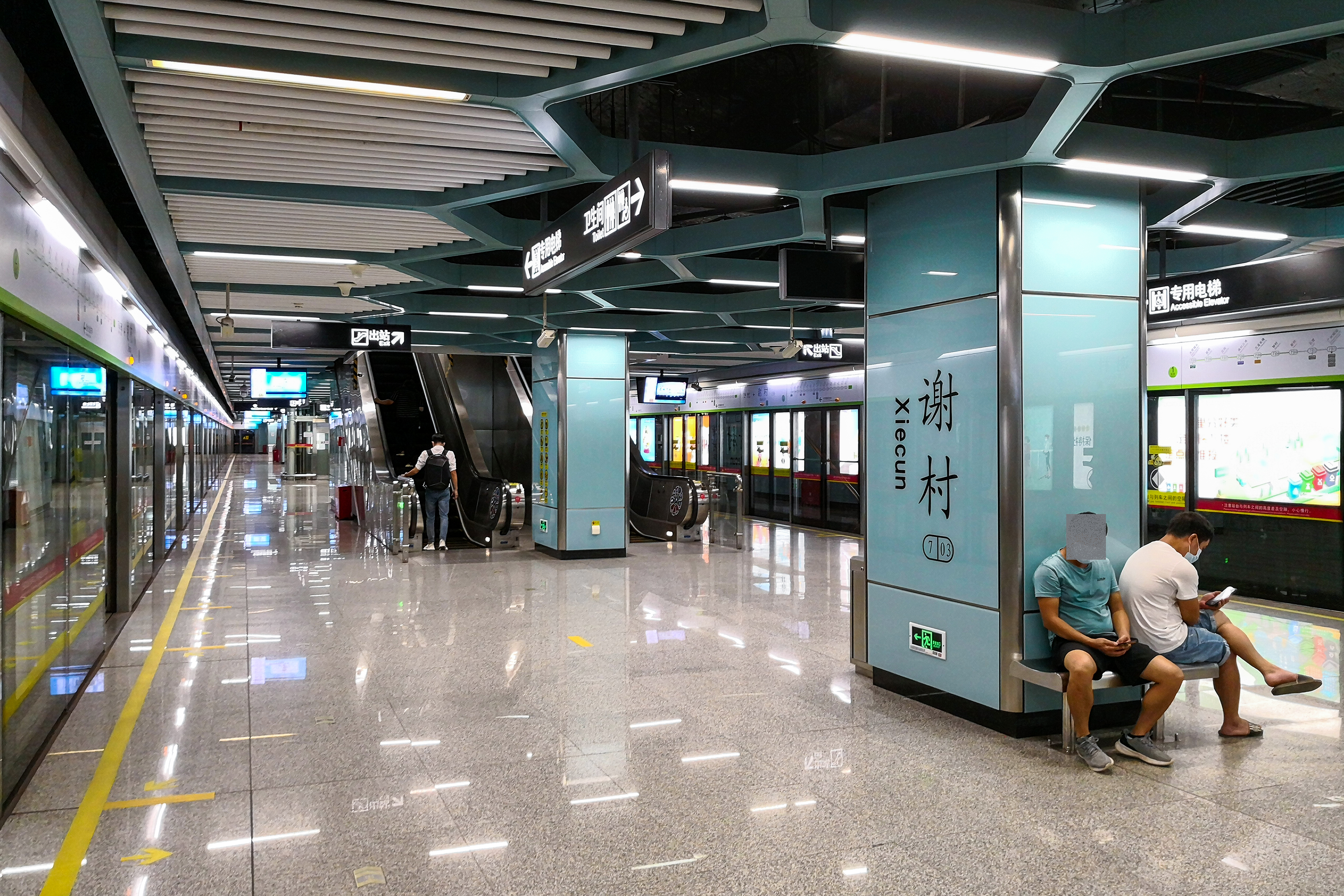

Chinese name
- Simplified Chinese: 谢村站
- Traditional Chinese: 謝村站
Transcriptions
Standard Mandarin
- Hanyu Pinyin: Xiècūn zhàn
Yue: Cantonese
- Jyutping: ze^{6}cyun^{1} zaam^{6}
- Hong Kong Romanization: Tse Tsuen station

General information
- Location: Panyu District, Guangzhou, Guangdong; China
- Operated by: Guangzhou Metro Co. Ltd.
- Line: Line 7
- Platforms: 2 (1 island platform)

Construction
- Structure type: Underground

Other information
- Station code: 703

History
- Opened: 28 December 2016; 9 years ago

Services
Preceding station	Guangzhou Metro	Following station
Shibi towards Meidi Dadao	Line 7	Zhongcun towards Yanshan
Location

Xiecun station (Chinese: 谢村站; pinyin: Xiècūn zhàn) is a station of Line 7 of the Guangzhou Metro. It started operations on 28 December 2016.

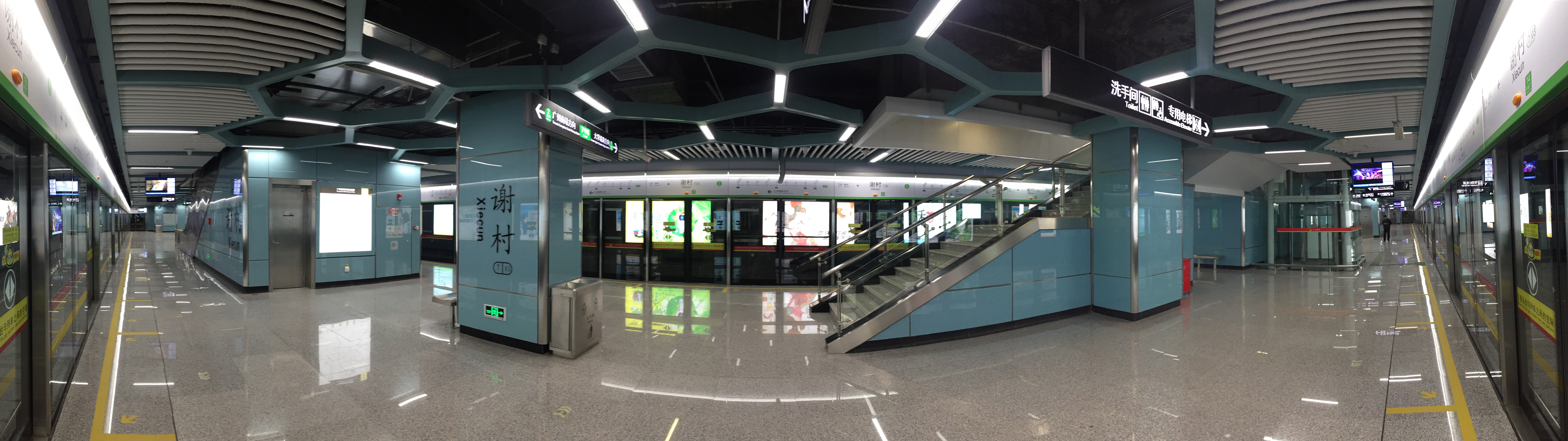
Platform 2

== Exits ==
Xiecun station has 3 points of entry/exit, with Exit A being accessible via elevator. Exits A and B opened when the station opened and Exit C opened on 8 September 2017.

- A: Hanxi Avenue Middle
- B: Hanxi Avenue Middle
- C: Hanxi Avenue Middle
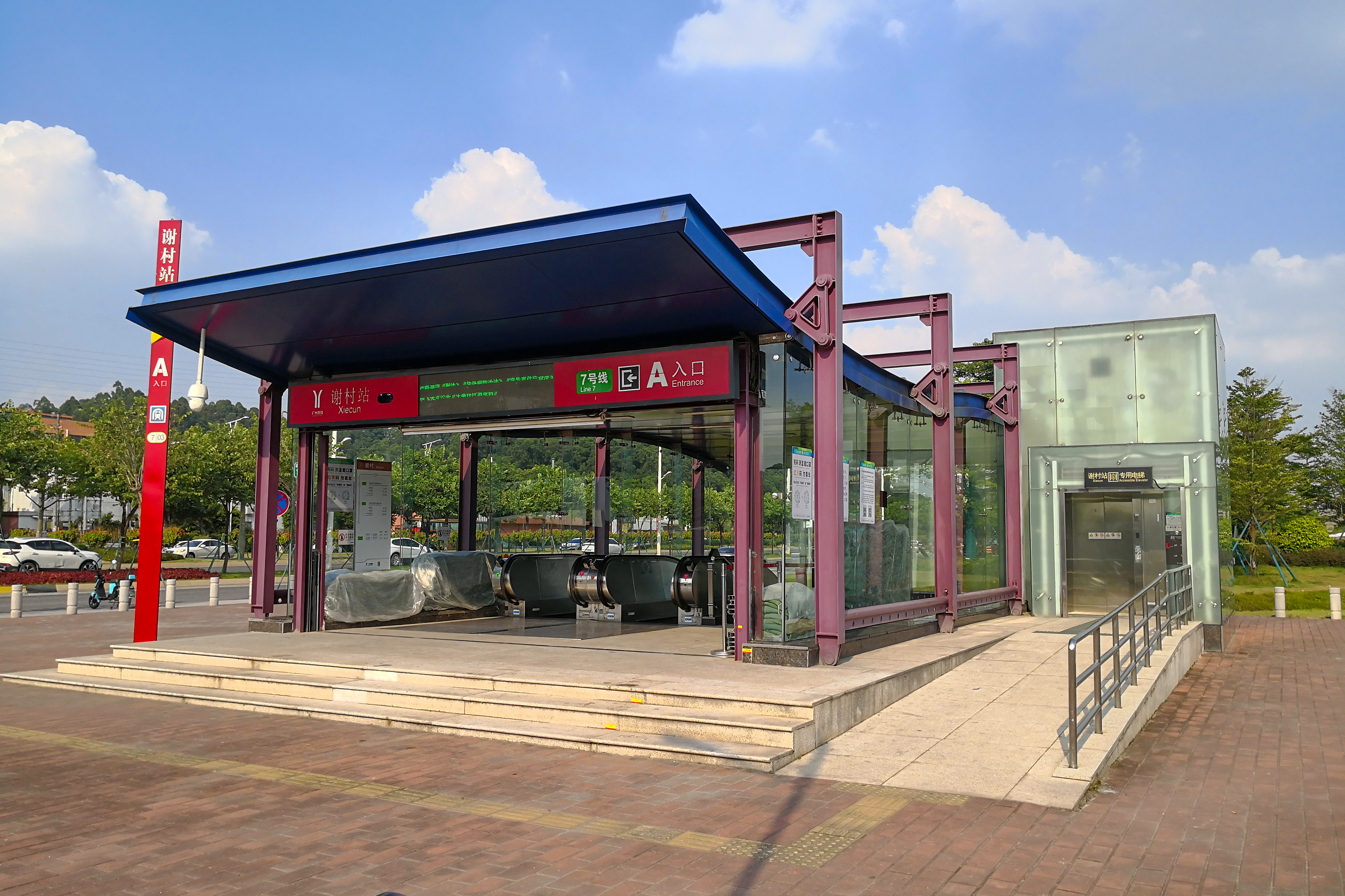
Entrance A

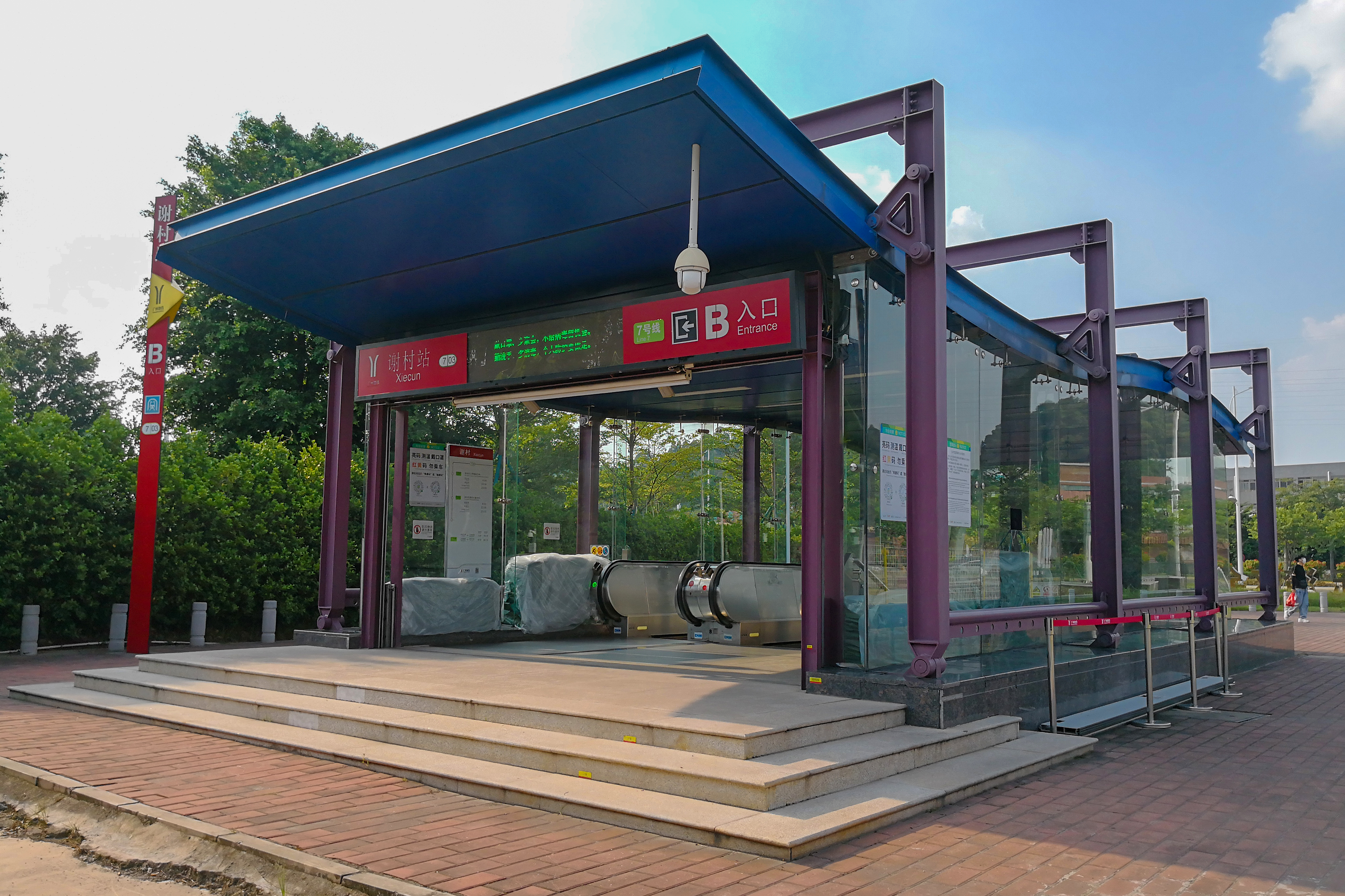
Entrance B

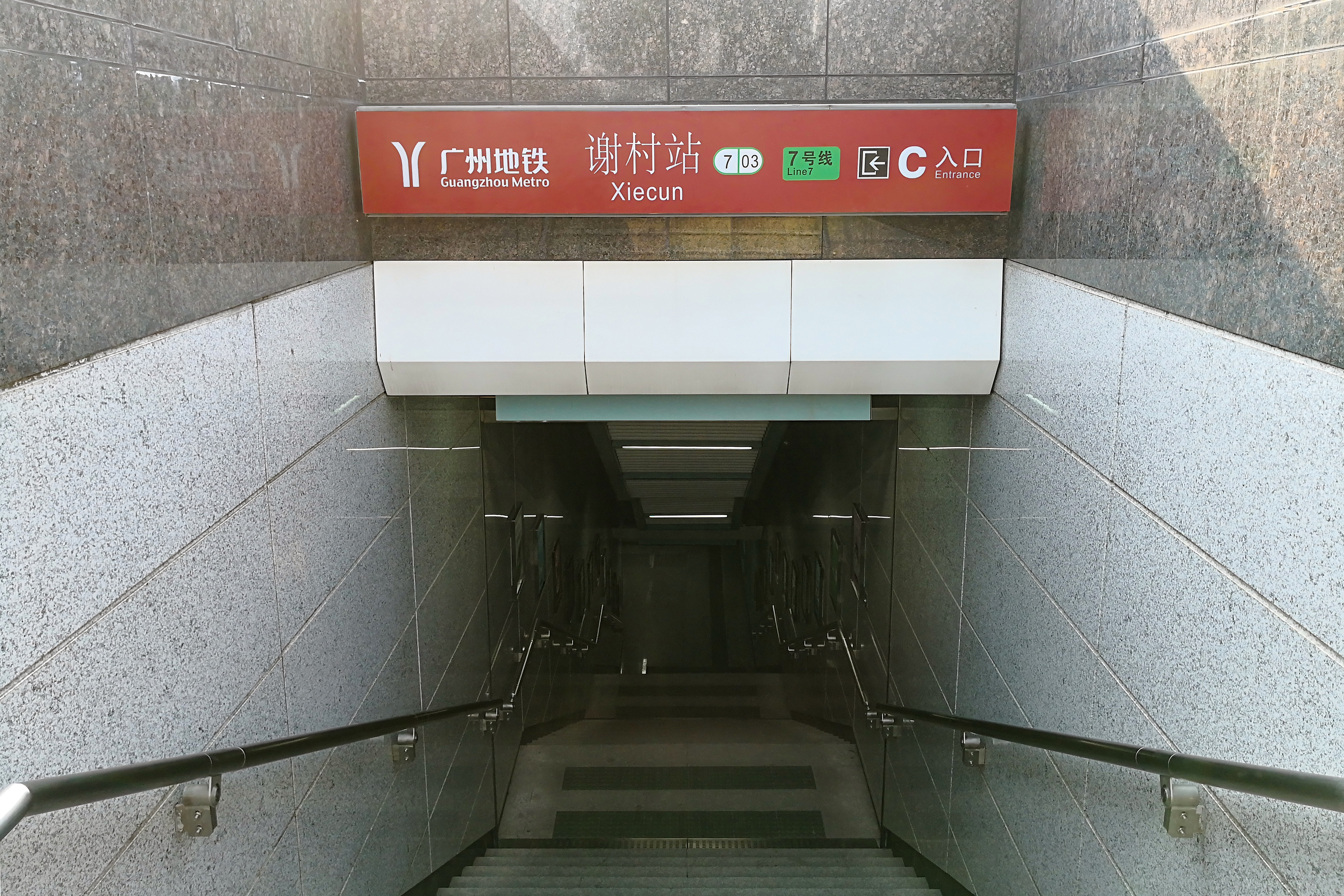
Entrance C

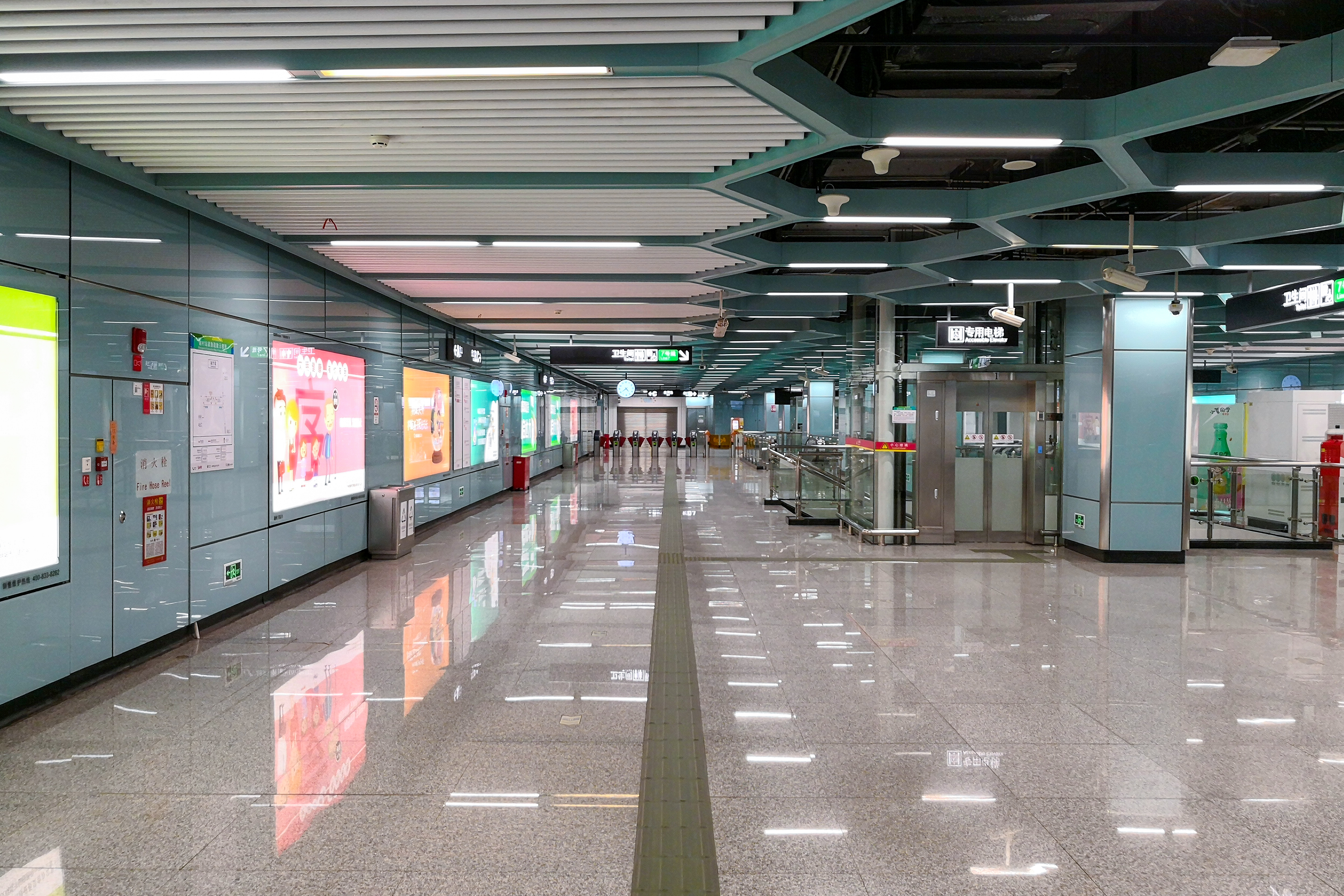
Concourse
