= Information Based Architecture =

Information Based Architecture (IBA) is a partnership between architects Mark Hemel and Barbara Kuit, set up in London in 1998.

The practice specializes in large-scale architectural and urban projects. It designed the Canton Tower, also called the 'Guangzhou TV astronomical and Sightseeing Tower'.

In 2002 they were short listed for the Young Architects of the Year Award in the United Kingdom. They have received support by the Dutch Department of Trade and Industry and received several encouragement-grants by the Netherlands Foundation for Visual Arts, Design and Architecture.

Based in Amsterdam, the Netherlands, IBA continues its work on both large and small projects in Europe and Asia. The work includes urban master-planning, architecture, landscaping and furniture design.
