= Barbara Kuit =

Dutch architect

Barbara Kuit is a Dutch architect. In 1998, together with her partner Mark Hemel, Kuit founded Information Based Architecture (IBA).

IBA designed the world’s tallest TV tower, the Canton Tower, formerly known as the Guangzhou TV & Sightseeing Tower in Guangzhou, China (completed in 2010).

== Biography ==
Kuit was born in Rotterdam, the Netherlands. Before founding IBA, she worked for several years at the office of Zaha Hadid Architects. There she worked on various projects including the MAXXI – National Museum of the 21st Century Arts in Rome, Millennium Dome in London and Science Center in Wolfsburg. Before that she worked at Harper Mackay in London, as a local architect on various projects of Philippe Starck, St Martin’s Lane Hotel and Sanderson Hotel in London.

== Career ==
=== Teaching ===
- From 1999–2007 Barbara Kuit was a visiting critic at the Architectural Association in London.
- 1990-1992 Taught various workshops at the Technical University Delft.
- 2004-2005 Visiting critic at the Academie van Bouwkunst, Rotterdam
- 2006- Visiting lecturer at TU Delft
- 2010- Post Graduate course coordinator University of Maastricht-Dep Architecture

=== Recognition ===
- Chosen as one of Design-Build network's new young architects to watch for 2010
- Conde Nast Traveler 2010: The New Wonders of the World
- Bizz magazine profile

== Projects ==
- 2004–Present Guangzhou TV & Sightseeing tower
  Principal Architect for the Guangzhou TV & Sightseeing tower of 114,000 square metres (1,230,000 sq ft) GFA in Guangzhou
  project includes a conference center, retail, cinema, multiple restaurants and cafes, observation decks and administration offices
- 2005–Present
  Principal Architect for a multifunctional student housing complex in El Mina, Ghana, including internet café, guesthouse and student living quarters
- 1997-2002 Zaha Hadid Architects
- 2001 BMW event centre in Muenchen
  Design architect of 18,000 square metres (190,000 sq ft) science museum
- 2000-2002 Wolfsburg Science Centre, Germany
  Design architect of 15,000 square metres (160,000 sq ft) science museum
- 1998-1999 Contemporary Arts Centre in Rome
  Design architect of 30,000 square metres (320,000 sq ft) museum. Program included exhibition spaces, retail, facilities and restaurants
- 1998-1999 Mind zone in the Millennium Dome in London
  Design architect, content development and communication with Artists. Design regarded 1,000 square metres (11,000 sq ft) exhibition pavilion
- 1995-1997 Harper Mackay
- 1996-1997 the Sanderson Hotel, London
  Philippe Starck in London the St Martins Lane Hotel
  architect of 15,000 square metres (160,000 sq ft) refurbishment of listed heritage building into 5 star hotel
- 1996-1997 the St Martins Lane Hotel, London
  architect of 10,000 square metres (110,000 sq ft) 5 start hotel development in Central London.

== Publications and Reference material ==
Kuit is working on a book titled Supermodel, the making of the world's tallest TV tower, which will come out in the early months of 2011.
