= Canton Tower =

Communications and observation tower in Guangzhou (Canton), China

- 广州塔
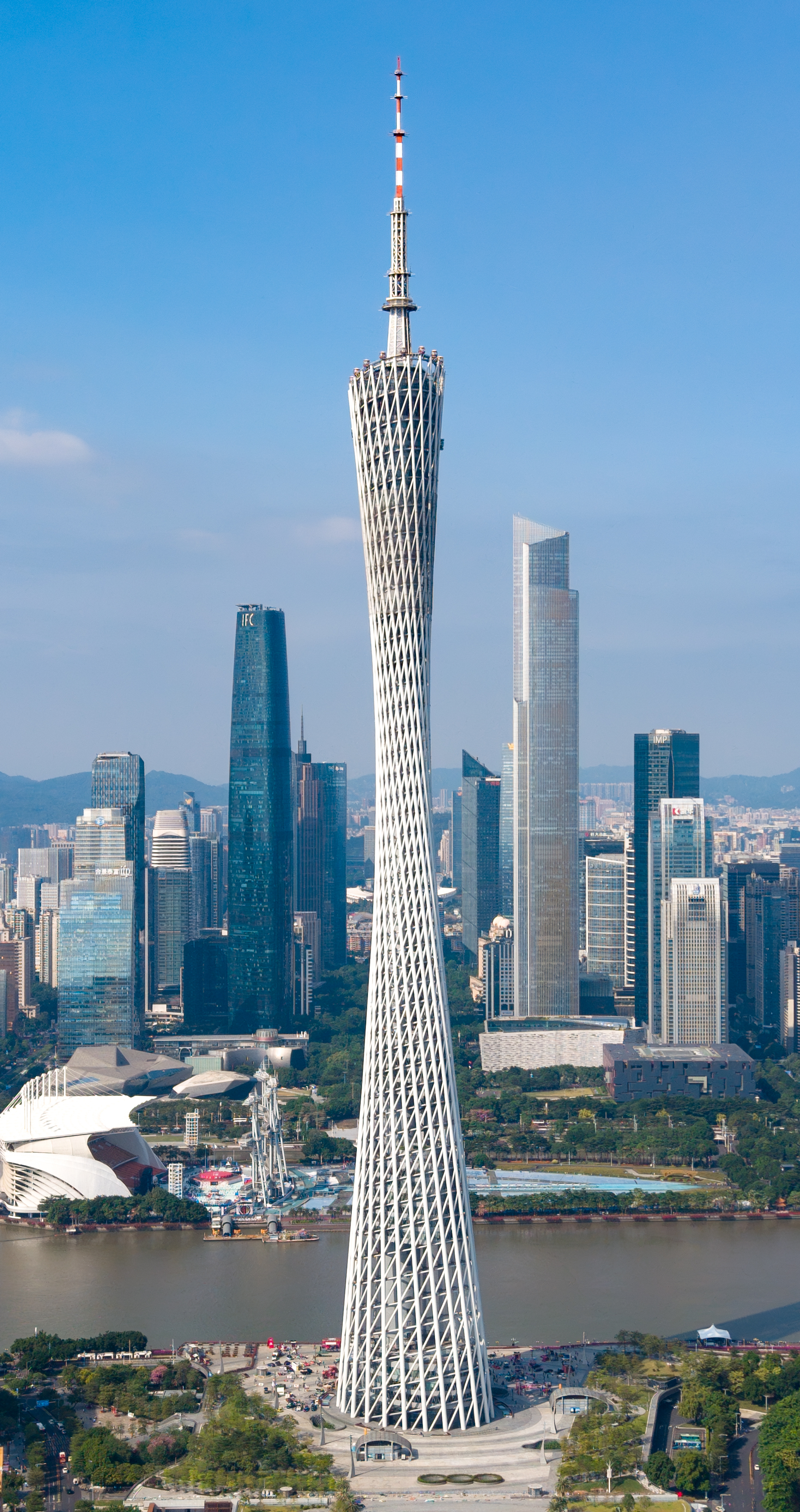
- The Canton Tower in 2024

- Location within Guangdong
- Former names: Guangzhou TV Astronomical and Sightseeing Tower

Record height
- Tallest in the world from August 2009 to March 2011^{[I]}
- Preceded by: CN Tower
- Surpassed by: Tokyo Skytree

General information
- Type: Mixed use: Restaurant, Observation, Telecommunications
- Architectural style: Structural expressionism
- Location: Yuejiang Road West/Yiyuan Road, Haizhu District, Guangzhou, Guangdong
- Coordinates: 23°6′32″N 113°19′8″E
- Groundbreaking: c. 2005; 21 years ago
- Construction started: November 2005
- Topped-out: August 2009
- Completed: 2010; 16 years ago
- Opening: 30 September 2010
- Cost: CNY ¥ 2,803,635,000.00 (US$450,000,000.00)

Height
- Tip: 602 m (1,975 ft)
- Roof: 462.2 m (1,516 ft)
- Top floor: 488 m (1,601 ft)
- Observatory: 449 m (1,473 ft)

Technical details
- Floor count: 112; 2 basement floors
- Floor area: 114,054 m^{2} (1,227,700 sq ft)
- Lifts/elevators: 9

Design and construction
- Architects: IBA: Mark Hemel & Barbara Kuit
- Structural engineer: Arup

Website
- www.cantontower.com

Canton Tower
- Simplified Chinese: 广州塔
- Traditional Chinese: 廣州塔
- Cantonese Yale: Gwóngjāu Taap
Transcriptions
Standard Mandarin
- Hanyu Pinyin: Guǎngzhōu Tǎ
- Bopomofo: ㄍㄨㄤˇ ㄓㄡ ㄊㄚˇ
- Wade–Giles: Kuang^{2}-chou^{1} T‘a^{3}
Yue: Cantonese
- Yale Romanization: Gwóngjāu Taap
- Jyutping: Gwong^{2} zau^{1} taap^{3}

Guangzhou TV Astronomical and Sightseeing Tower
- Simplified Chinese: 广州电视台天文及观光塔
- Traditional Chinese: 廣州電視台天文及觀光塔
- Cantonese Yale: Gwóngjāu Dihnsihtòih Tīnmán Kahp Gūn'gwōng Taap
Transcriptions
Standard Mandarin
- Hanyu Pinyin: Guǎngzhōu Diànshìtái Tiānwén Jí Guānguāng Tǎ
- Bopomofo: ㄍㄨㄤˇ ㄓㄡ ㄉㄧㄢˋ ㄕˋ ㄊㄞˊ ㄊㄧㄢ ㄨㄣˊ ㄐㄧˊ ㄍㄨㄤ ㄍㄨㄢ ㄊㄚˇ
- Wade–Giles: Kuang^{3}-chou^{1} Tian^{4}-shih^{4}-t‘ai^{2} T‘ian^{1}-wen^{2} Chi^{2} Kuan^{1}-kuang^{1} T‘a^{3}
Yue: Cantonese
- Yale Romanization: Gwóngjāu Dihnsihtòih Tīnmán Kahp Gūn'gwōng Taap
- Jyutping: Gwong^{2} zau^{1} din^{6} si^{6} toi^{4} tin^{1} man^{4} kap^{6} gun^{1} gwong^{1} taap^{3}

The Canton Tower (Chinese: 广州塔), formally Guangzhou TV Astronomical and Sightseeing Tower (Chinese: 广州电视台天文及观光塔), is a 600-metre-tall (2,000 ft) multipurpose observation tower in the Haizhu District of Guangzhou (alternatively romanized as Canton), China. The tower was topped out in 2009 and it became operational on 29 September 2010 in time for the 2010 Asian Games. The tower briefly held the title of tallest tower in the world, replacing Toronto's CN Tower, before being surpassed by the Tokyo Skytree. It was the tallest structure in China prior to the topping out of the Shanghai Tower on 3 August 2013, and is now China's second-tallest tower and the fifth-tallest freestanding structure in the world.

== Naming and etymology ==
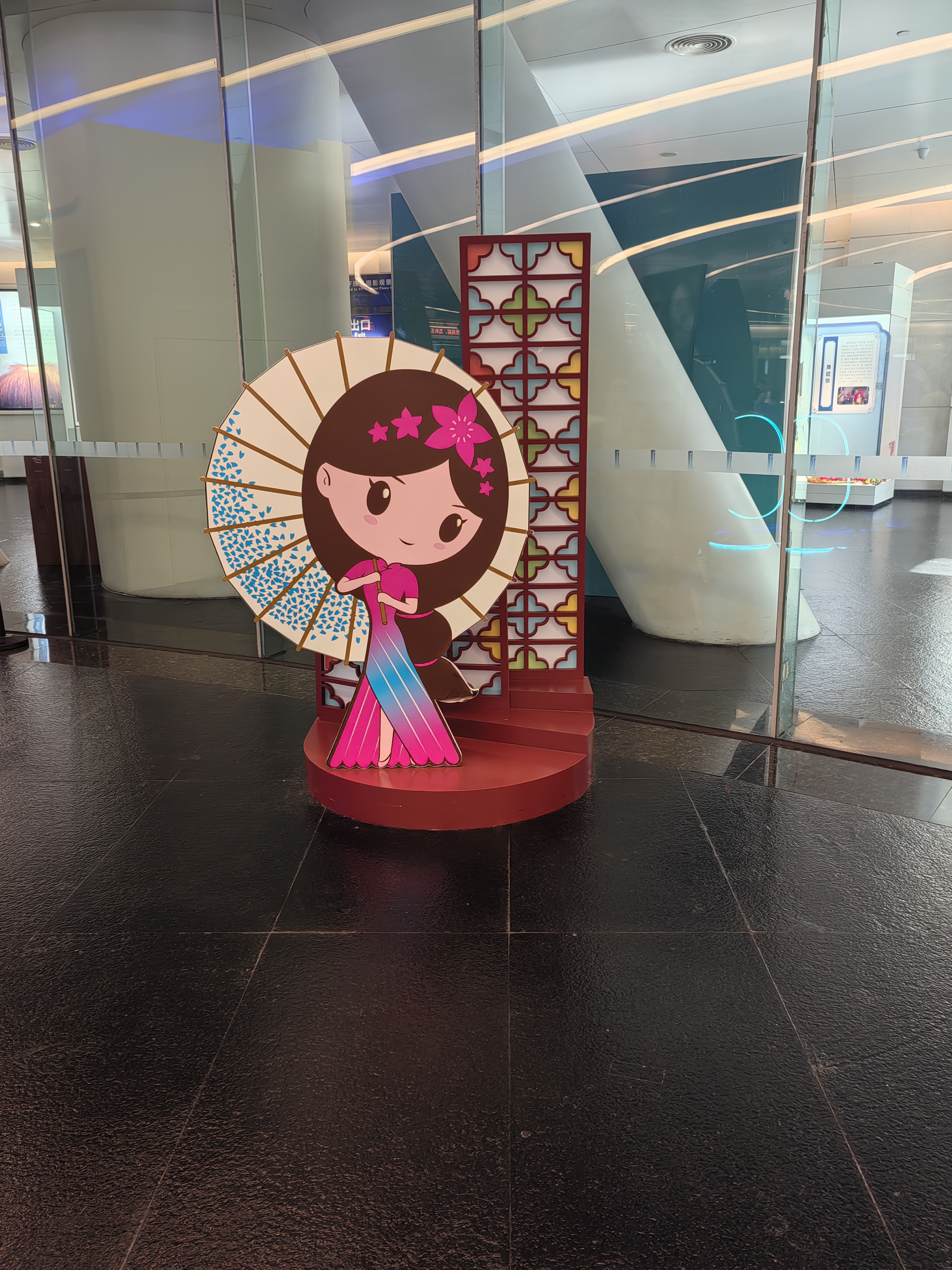
The mascot of the Canton Tower, Xiaomanyao (小蛮腰; 'Slim Waist'), was named after the nickname of the tower.

There had been a long discussion about the naming of the Canton Tower since the commencement of its construction in 2005 after the groundbreaking ceremony. In September 2020, at the request of the tower's investor, Guangzhou Daily launched a contest for naming proposals. The contest attracted over 180,000 valid entries, among which "Haixin Tower" (Chinese: 海心塔; lit. 'Tower in the Sea') was awarded the first prize. The name alluded to the city's historical setting as the start of the Maritime Silk Road and the tower's geographical proximity to Haixinsha Island. However, this name was considered obscure to people unfamiliar with the history of the city. Local residents continued to refer to the tower by various nicknames including "Slim Waist" (Chinese: 小蛮腰), "Twisted Firewood" (Chinese: 扭纹柴; a metaphor for "stubborn" in Cantonese) and "Yangdianfeng" (Chinese: 羊巅峰; lit. 'Peak of the Ram City'; homophone of "epilepsy" in colloquial Chinese).

The name was reconsidered in 2010. After surveying a broad range of public opinions, "Canton Tower" was decided as the official English name and announced at the end of September 2010. The new English name, which alludes to the city's prosperous past, was considered the most identifying and least ambiguous among the multitude of proposals.

== History ==
Canton Tower was constructed by Guangzhou New Television Tower Group. It was designed by the Dutch architects Mark Hemel and Barbara Kuit of Information Based Architecture, together with Arup, the international design, engineering and business consulting firm headquartered in London, United Kingdom. In 2004, Information Based Architecture and Arup won the international competition, in which many internationally large architectural offices participated. In the same year, the IBA – Arup team in Amsterdam developed the tower's concept design. In later stages, IBA cooperated mainly with the local Chinese office of Arup and a Local Design Institute. Subsequently, in 2005, the groundbreaking of the Canton Tower took place.

The tower, although not fully completed, opened to the public on 1 October 2010 in time for the 16th Asian Games, hosted by Guangzhou in November 2010. The rooftop observatory finally received its official opening in December 2011.

== Structure and construction ==
The Canton Tower's twisted shape or hyperboloid structure corresponds to the Russian Empire patent No. 1896, dated 12 March 1899 received by Vladimir Shukhov, the Russian engineer and architect. The structure is similar to the Adziogol Lighthouse (designed by Vladimir Shukhov in 1910) in Ukraine's Dnepr delta.

=== Structural concept ===
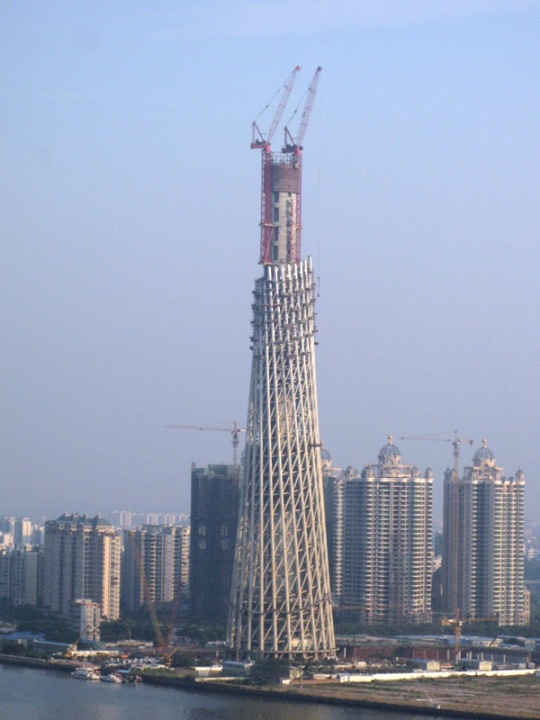
The tower under construction in November 2007.

The tower was designed by Information Based Architecture and Arup. The Arup team led by structural engineer Prof. Dr. Joop Paul introduced near mass customization to the joint design, in combination with parametric design methods, and applied a simple structural concept of three elements: columns, rings and braces, to this more complex geometry.

The waist of the tower contains a 180-metre (590 ft) open-air skywalk where visitors can physically climb the tower. There are outdoor gardens set within the structure, and at the top, just above 452 metres (1,483 ft), a large open-air observation deck.

The interior of the tower is subdivided into programmatic zones with various functions, including TV and radio transmission facilities, observatory decks, revolving restaurants, computer gaming, restaurants, exhibition spaces, conference rooms, shops, and 4D cinemas.

A deck at the base of the tower hides the tower's functional workings. All infrastructural connections – metro and bus stations – are situated underground. This level also includes exhibition spaces, a food court, a commercial space, a parking area for cars and coaches. There are two types of elevators: slow-speed panoramic and high-speed double-decker.

The zone from 80 to 170 metres (260 to 560 ft) consists of a 4D cinema, a play-hall area, restaurants, coffee shops and outdoor gardens with teahouses. The highest and longest open-air staircase in the world, the Skywalk, starts at the height of 170 metres (560 ft) and spirals almost 170 metres (560 ft) higher, all the way through the waist. Parts of the skywalk's floors are laid with transparent glass.

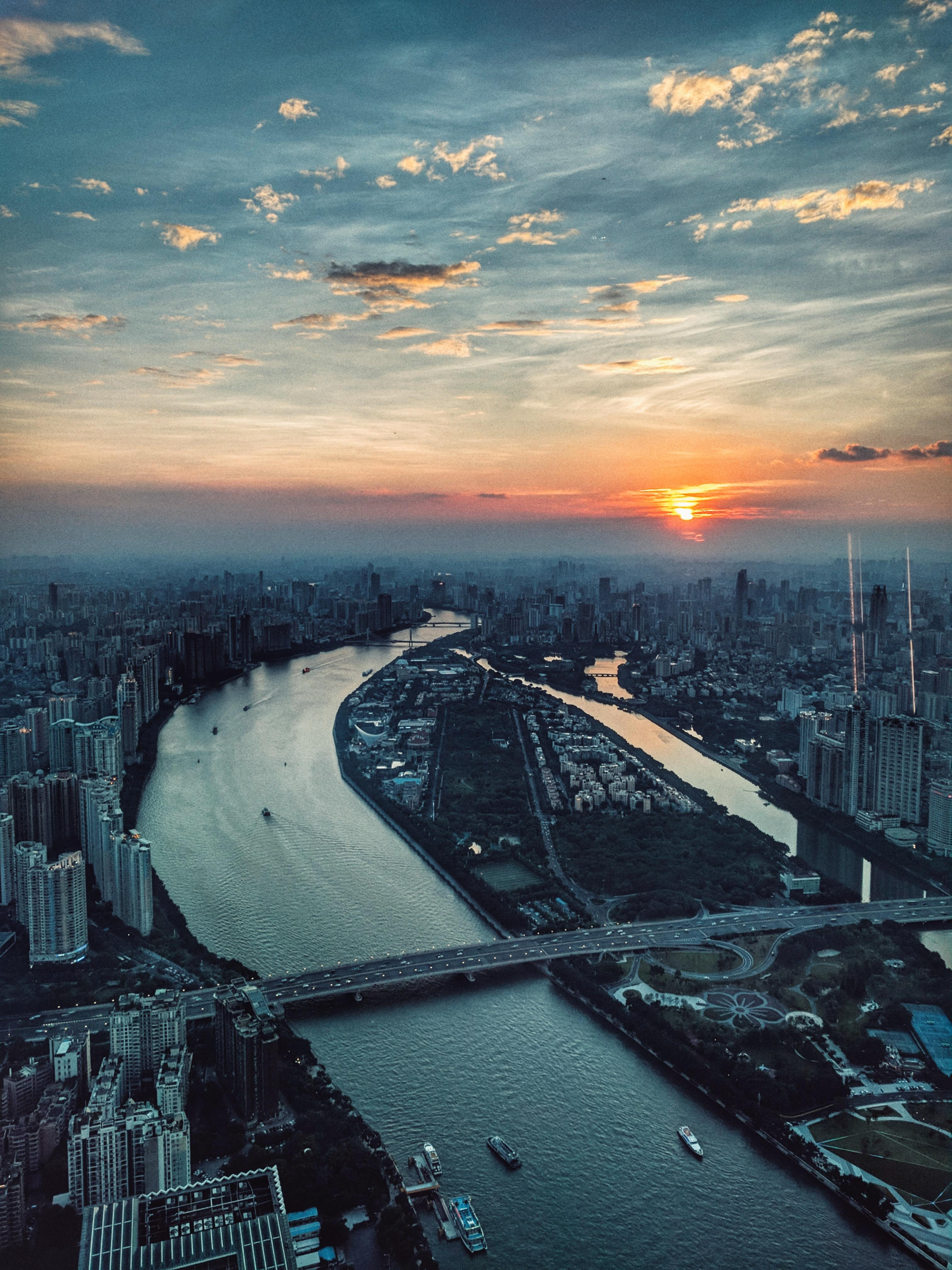
View of the Pearl River from Canton Tower

The top zone of the tower begins above the stairway, housing various technical functions as well as a two-story rotating restaurant, a tuned mass damper and the upper observation levels. From the upper observation levels it is possible to ascend even higher, via a further set of the stairs, to a terraced observation square rising above the tower's top ring.

==== The twist ====
The form, volume and structure of the towers is generated by two ellipses, one at foundation level and the other at a horizontal plane at 450 metres (1,480 ft). These two ellipses are rotated relative to another. The tightening caused by the rotation between the two ellipses forms a "waist" and a densification of material halfway up the tower. This means that the lattice structure, which at the bottom of the tower is porous and spacious, becomes denser at waist level. The waist itself becomes tight, like a twisted rope; transparency is reduced and views to the outside are limited. Further up the tower the lattice opens again, accentuated here by the tapering of the structural column-tubes.

=== Rooftop observatory ===
The indoor public observatory is 449 meters above the ground, which takes the form of a terraced elliptical space, roughly half the size of a standard football field. Opened in December 2011, the rooftop at 488 meters was the highest and largest outdoor observation deck in the world, taking over the title from the observation deck of Burj Khalifa at 452 meters. This remained the case until 14 October 2014, when the record of highest outdoor observatory was retaken by Burj Khalifa when it opened its new observatory called at the Top – Sky, at a height of 555 meters.

Sixteen transparent "crystal" passenger cars, each with a diameter of 3.2 metres (10 ft) and able to carry four to six people, travel on a track round the edge of the tower's roof, taking between 20 and 40 minutes to circumnavigate the rooftop. The installation is described by the media as a Ferris wheel; however, its passenger cars are not suspended from the rim of a wheel and remain horizontal without being fully rotated, and the track, which follows the incline of the roof, is closer to the horizontal than the vertical.

=== Architectural lighting design ===
At night, the tower glows and emits light, rather than being uplit. Lighting designer Rogier van der Heide is known for this concept, which he also applied at the Marunouchi Building in Tokyo. Each node in the lighting design is individually controllable to allow for animations and color changes across the entire height of the tower. As all lighting is based on LED technology, and all fixtures are located on the structure itself, the lighting scheme consumes only 15% of the allowed maximum for façade lighting.

At the time of the design of Canton Tower, lighting designer Rogier van der Heide was Global Leader of Arup Lighting.

== Measurements ==
The Canton Tower's main body stands at 450 metres (1,480 ft). Combined with the tower's 150-metre-long (490 ft) antenna, the Canton Tower has a total height of 604 metres (1,982 ft), making it the second-tallest tower in the world, second tallest in Asia, and the tallest in the People's Republic of China. The tower has a total of 112 floors.

The Canton Tower weighs a total of 100,000 tonnes (220,000,000 lb; 100,000,000 kg), including the tower's antenna which weighs 1,550 tonnes (3,420,000 lb; 1,550,000 kg) and the main body, which includes all the features of the tower, which weighs a total of 98,450 tonnes (217,050,000 lb; 98,450,000 kg).

The Canton Tower occupies a total floor area of 175,458 square metres (1,888,610 sq ft). In addition, the tower's net usable area measures 114,054 square metres (1,227,670 sq ft).

== Events ==
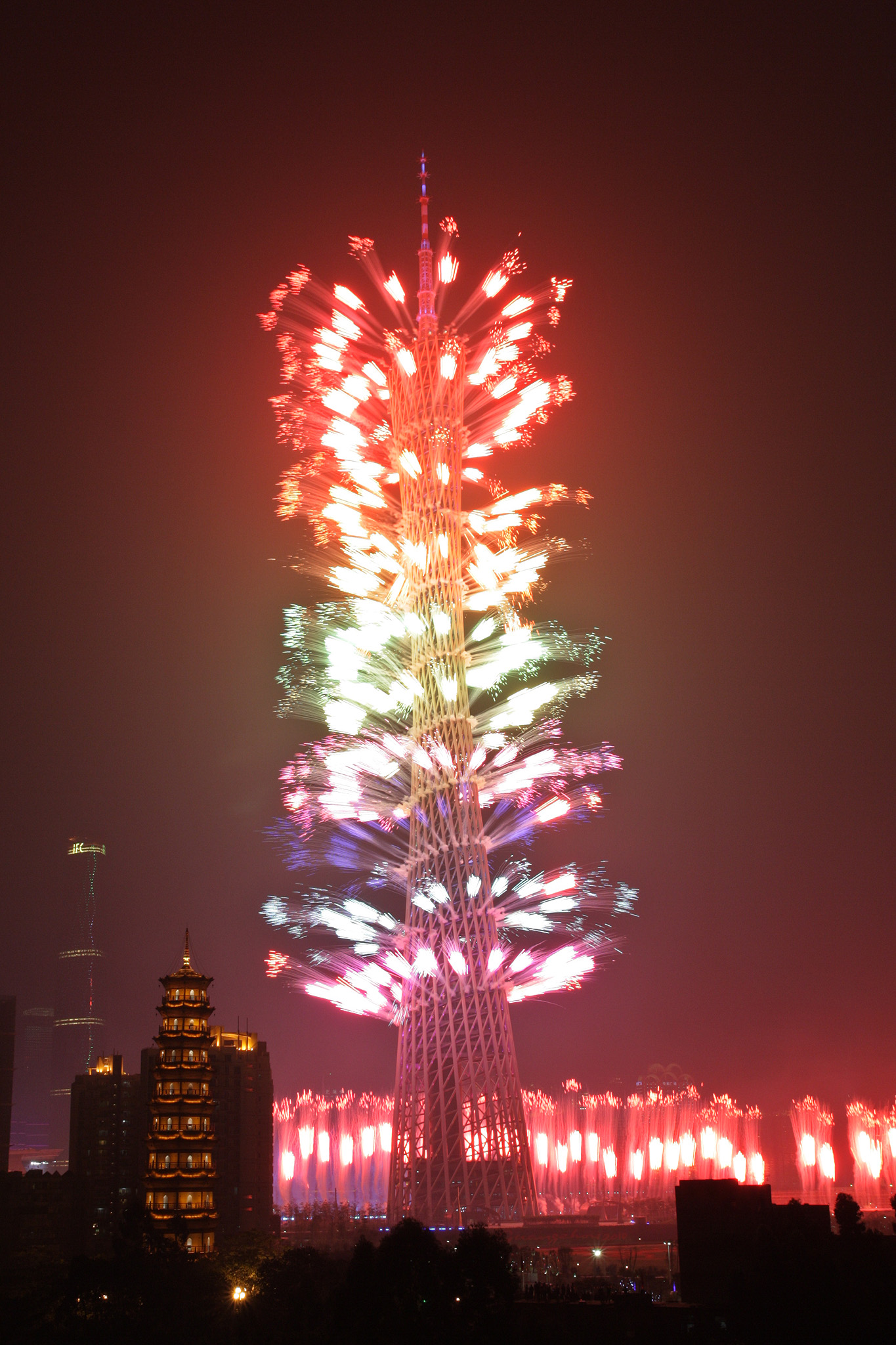
Fireworks launched off the Canton Tower during the 2010 Asian Games opening ceremony.

- The tower served as a focal point for the opening ceremonies of the 2010 Asian Games in Guangzhou, which were held on Haixinsha Island.
- The Canton Tower hosted an annual Christmas Concert on Christmas Eve inside the tower's ground floor, making it the first concert to be held in the Canton Tower. Celebrated on Christmas Eve, the concert was held on 24 December 2012.

== Geography ==
The Canton Tower is situated alongside the Yiyuan Road (Yuejiang Road West), in the Haizhu District of Guangzhou, and is situated south of the Zhujiang New Town. Additionally, several famous landmarks surround the tower, including pagodas, a park towards the south, and several high-rise apartments, buildings, and skyscrapers, both commercial and residential.

== Gallery ==
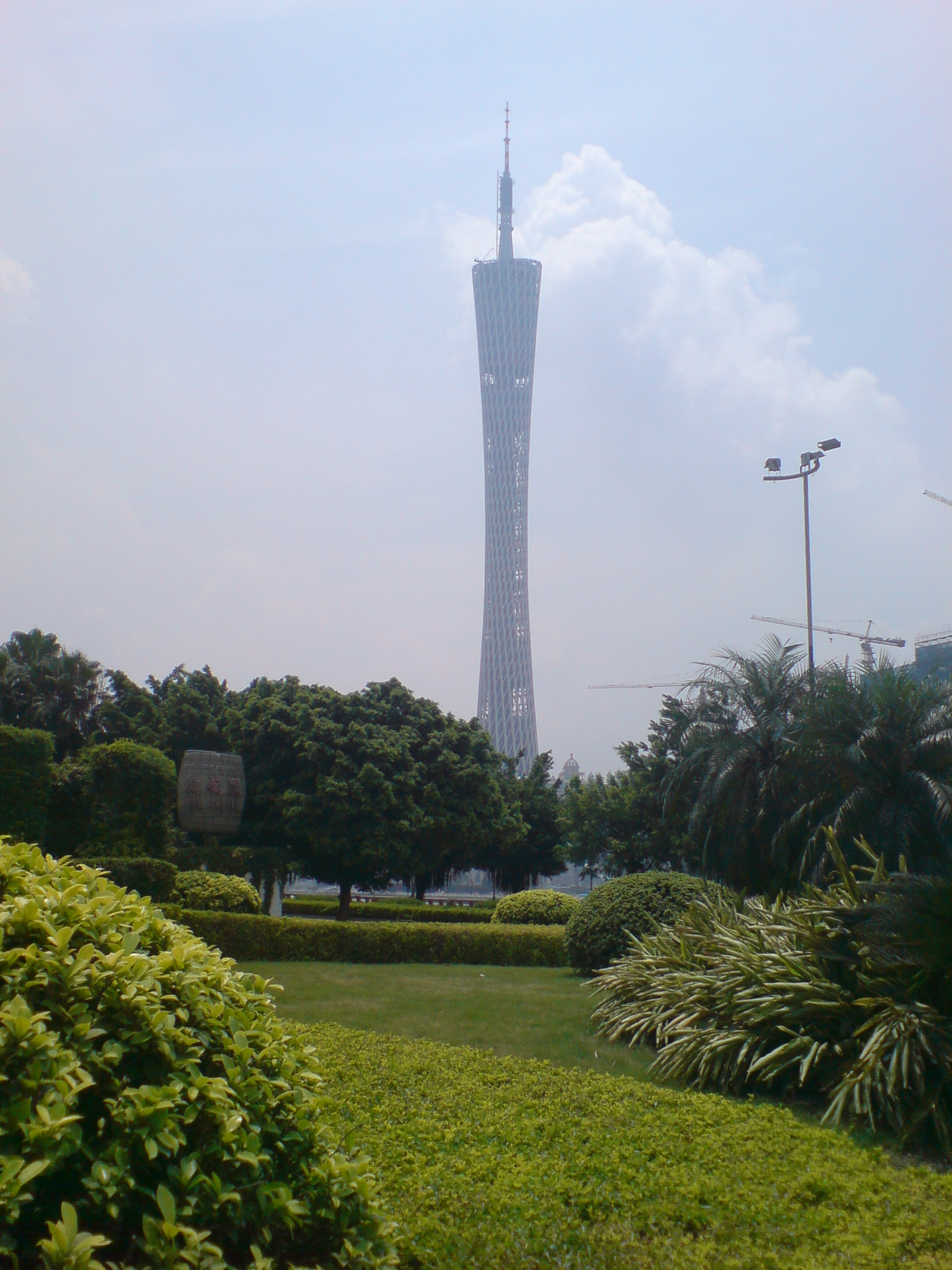
Canton Tower as viewed from the front entrance of Hongcheng Park.

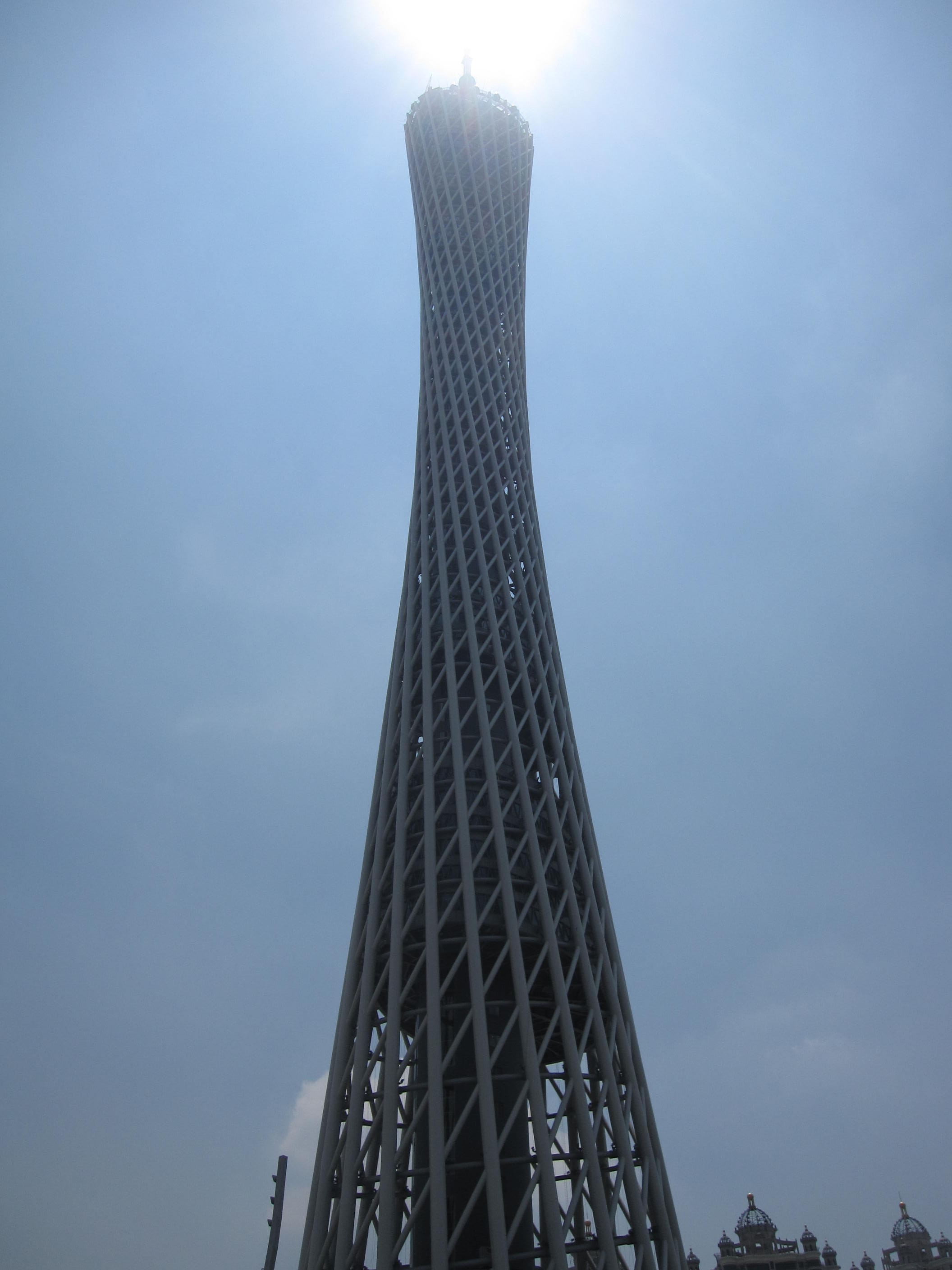
Canton Tower at noon.

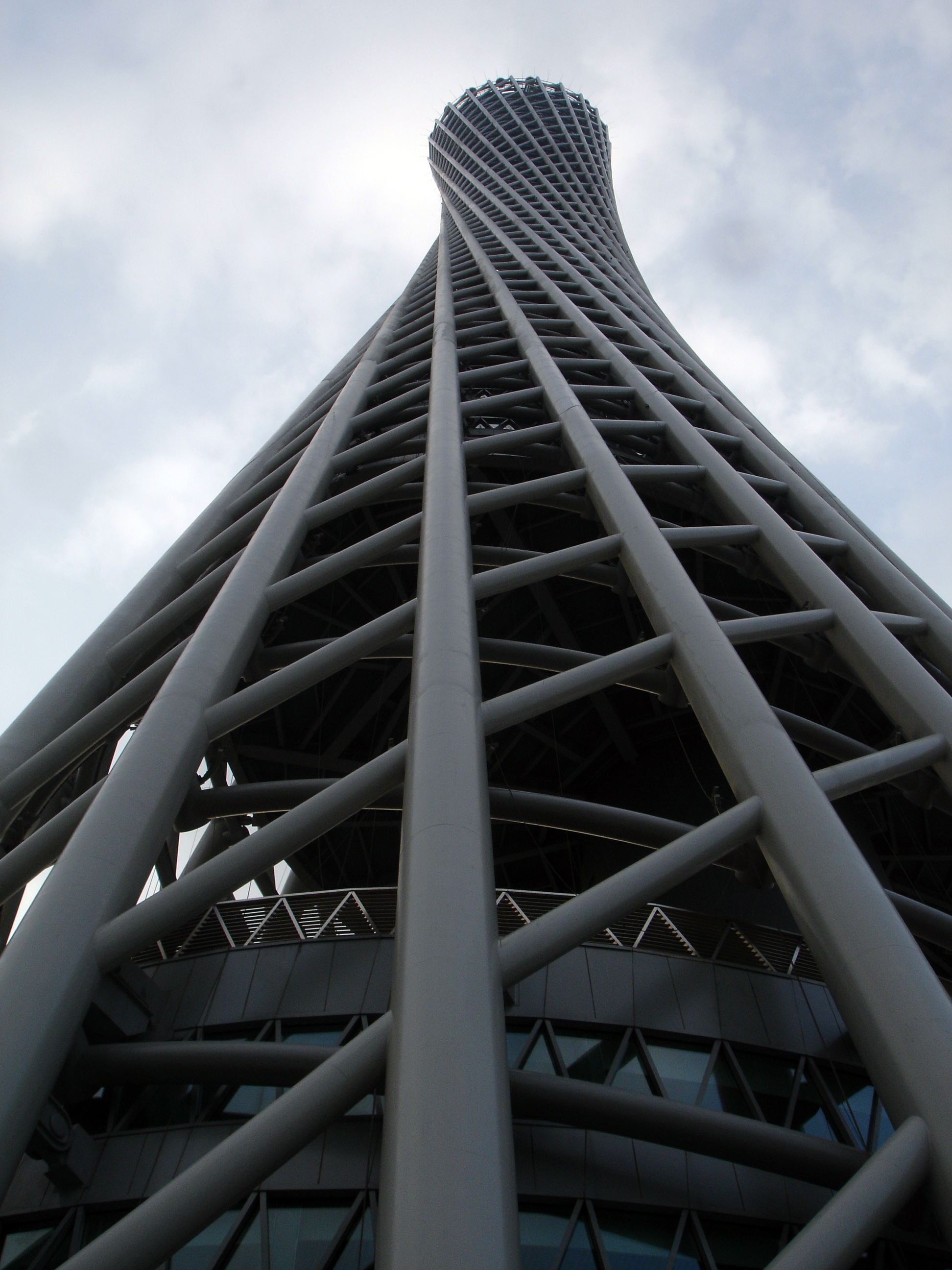
Canton Tower early in the afternoon, shot from the ground.

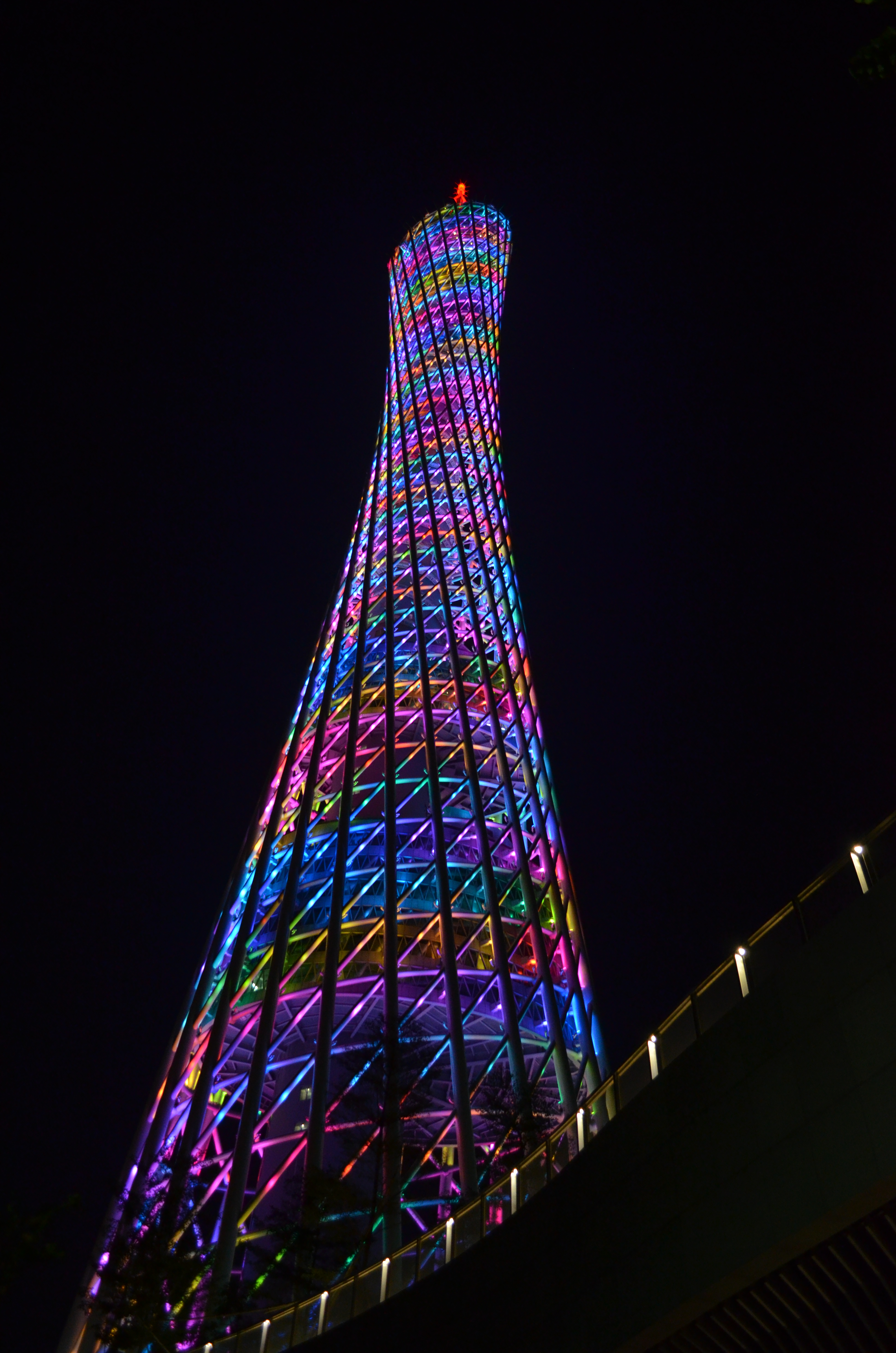
The Canton Tower lit up at night.

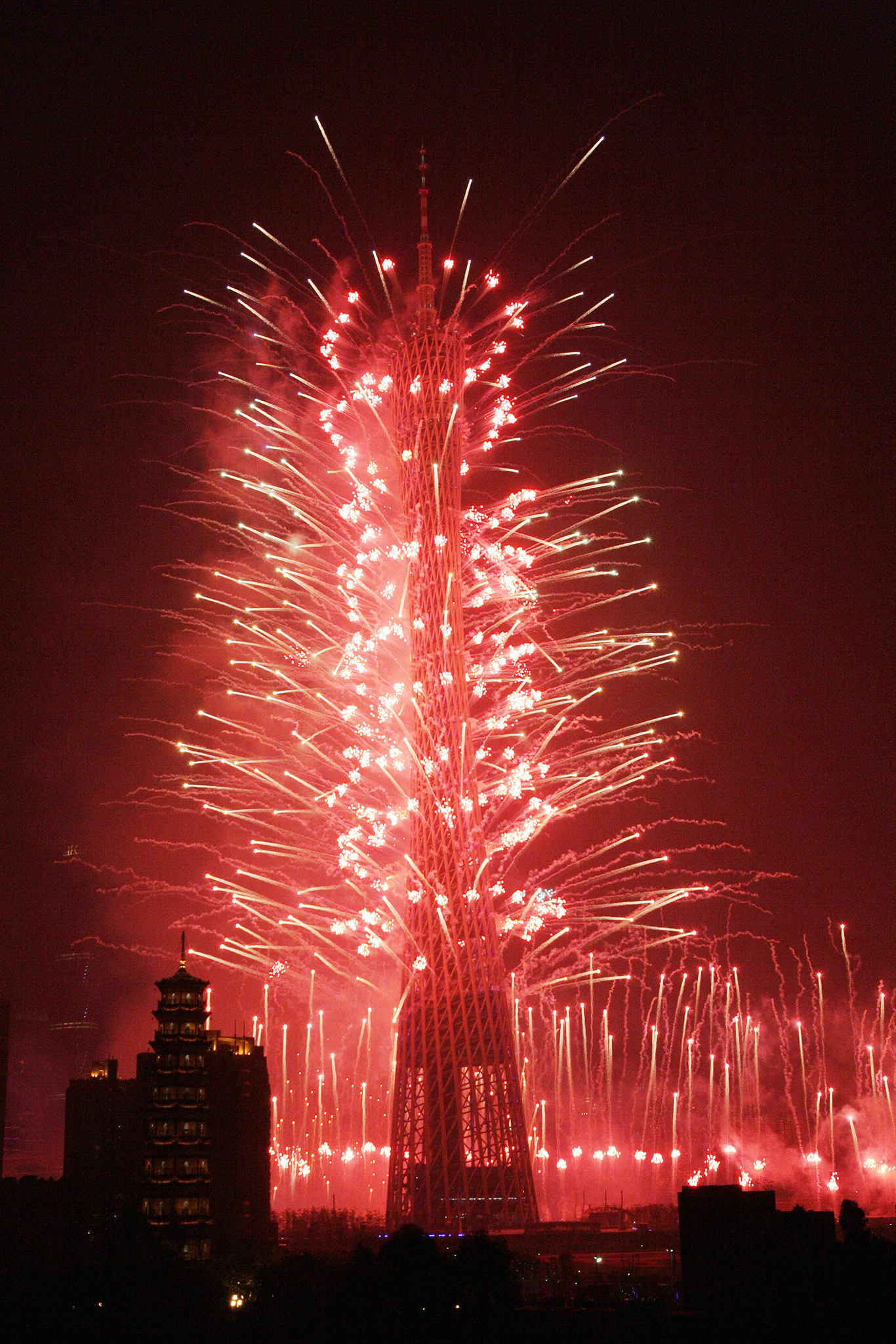
Red fireworks from the Canton Tower during the 2010 Asian Games opening ceremony, hosted in Guangzhou

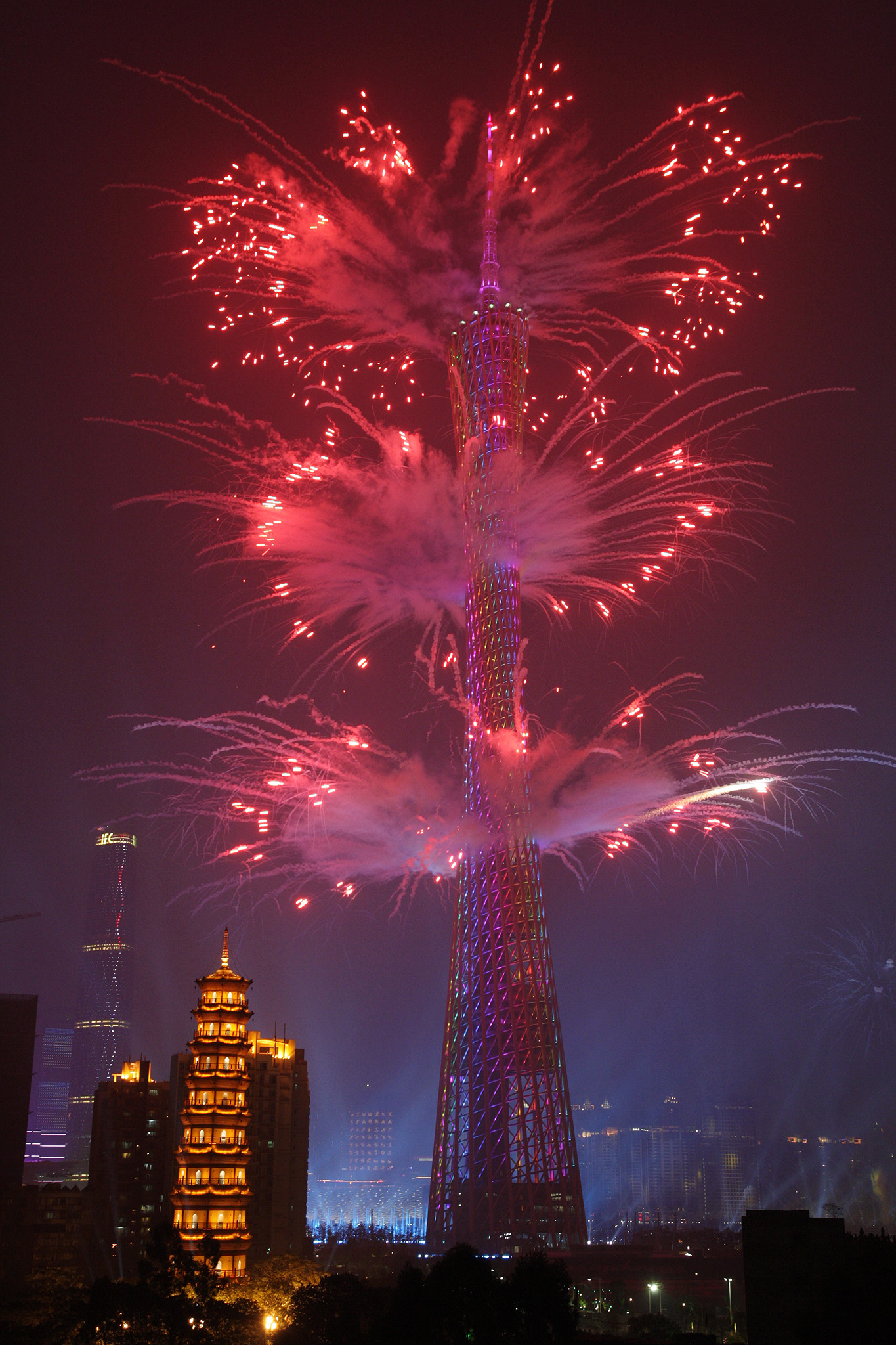
Red fireworks coming out from the Canton Tower during the 2010 Asian Games

=== Construction history ===
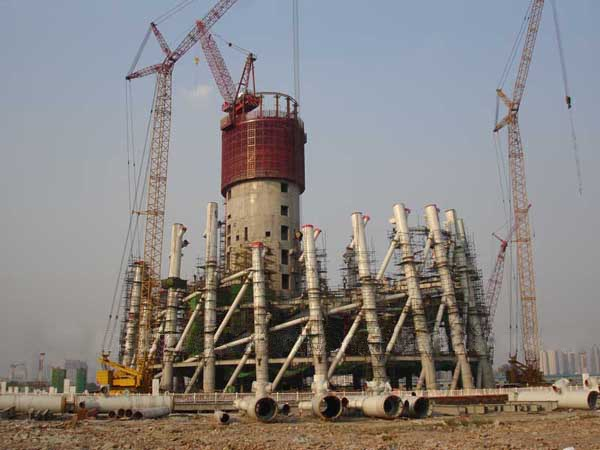
February 2007

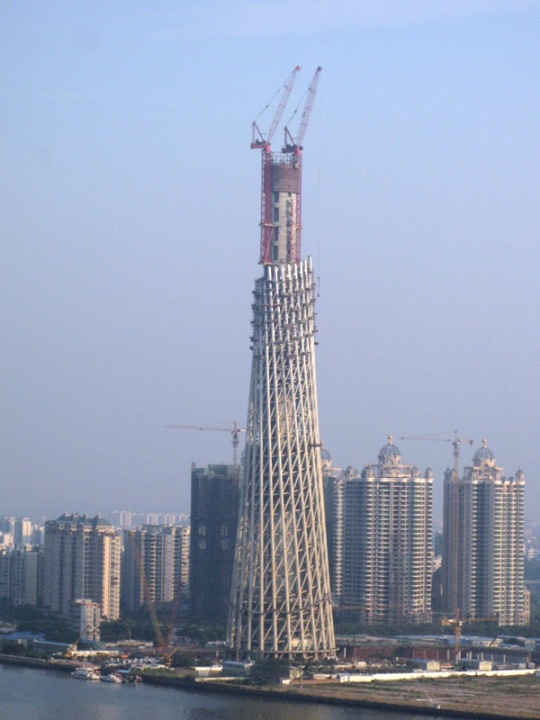
November 2007

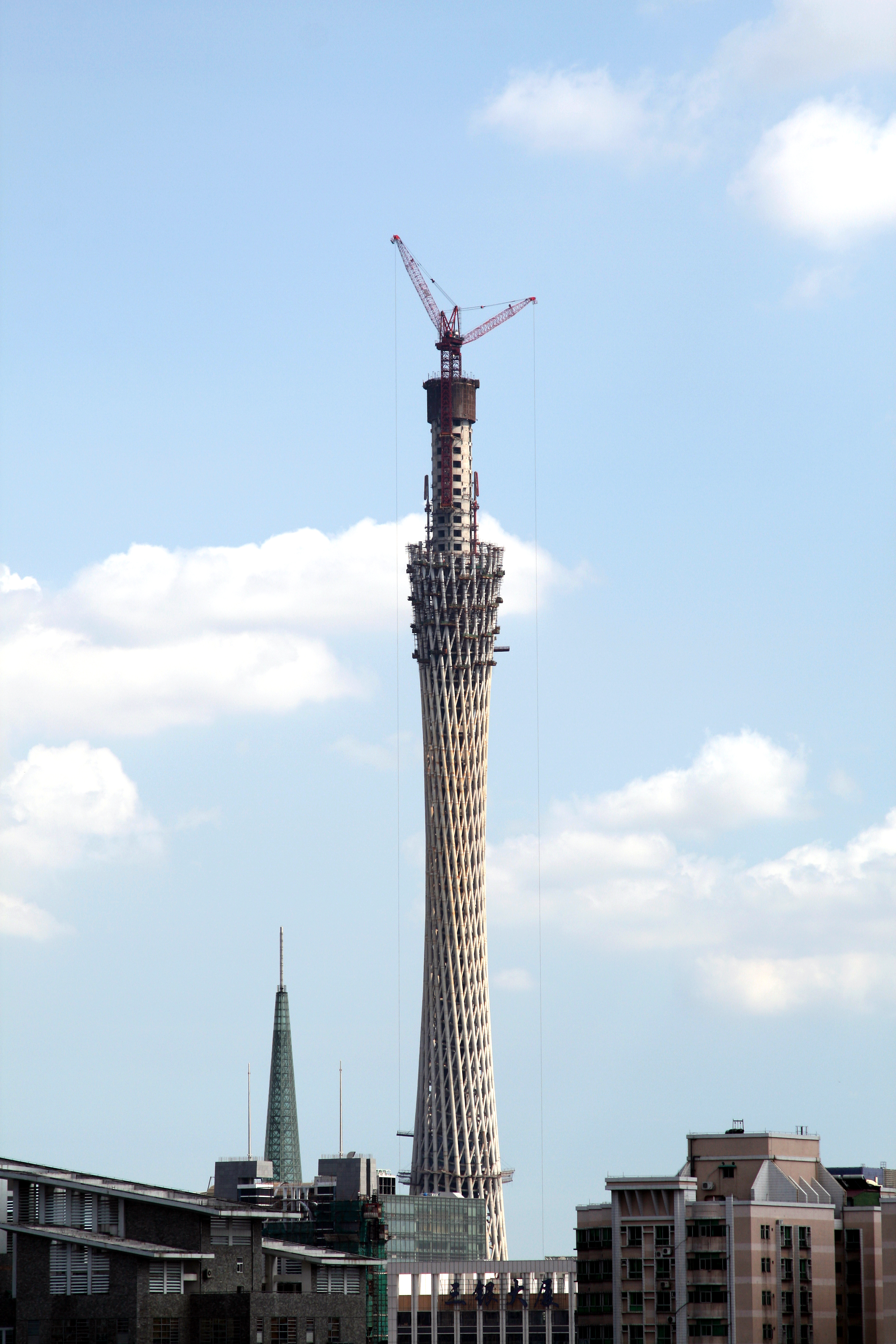
August 2008

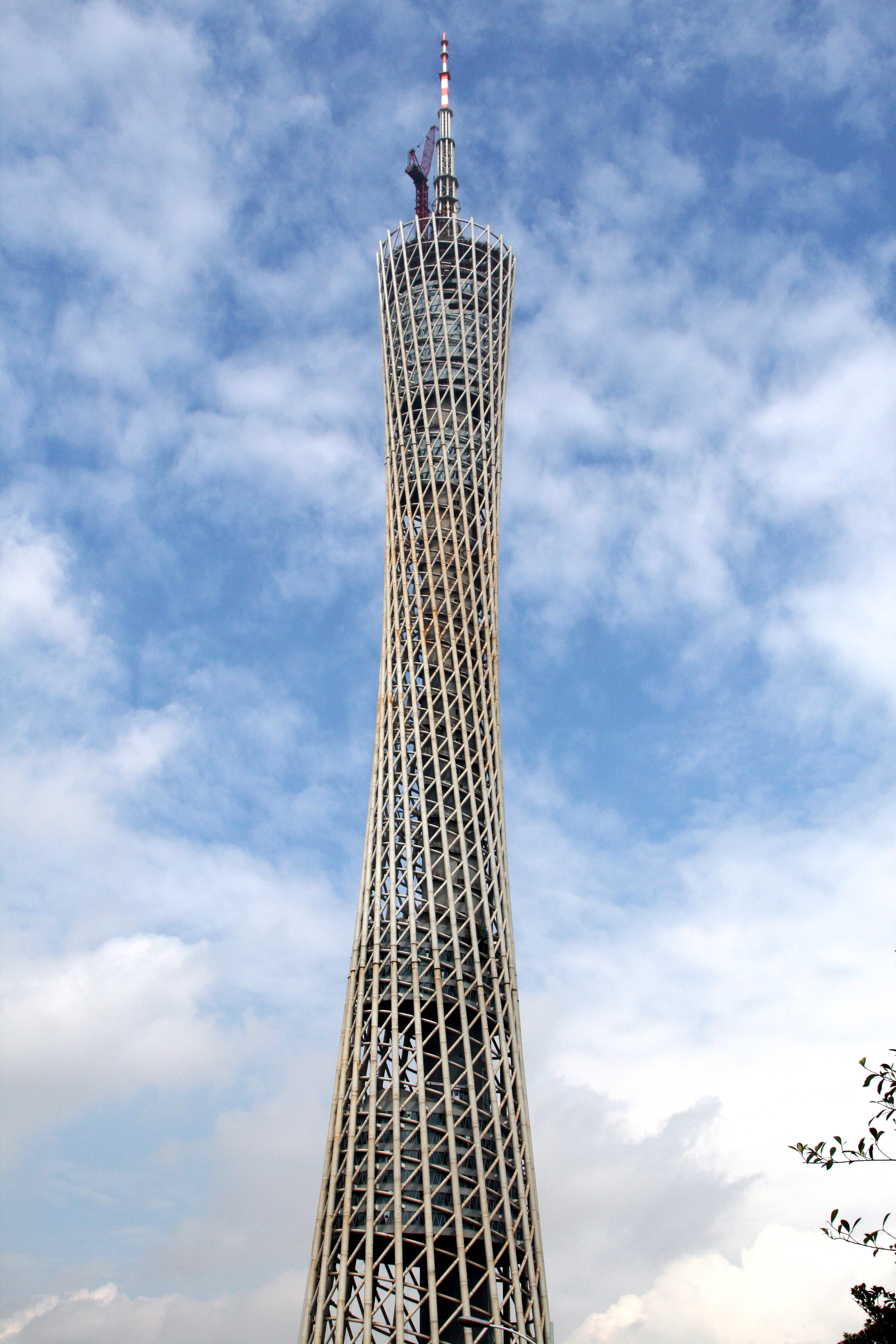
June 2009

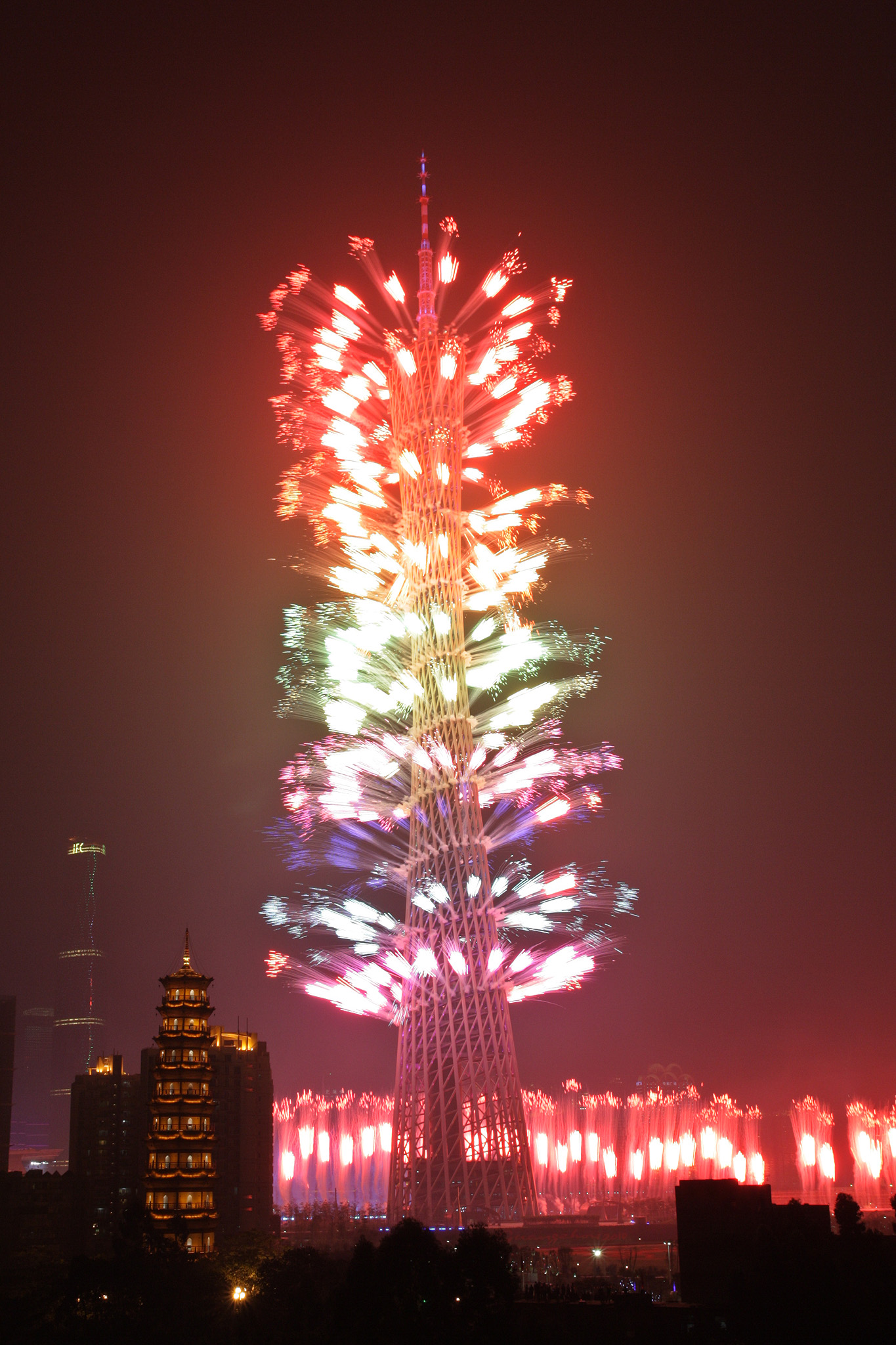
Post-construction – 2010 Asian Games opening ceremony

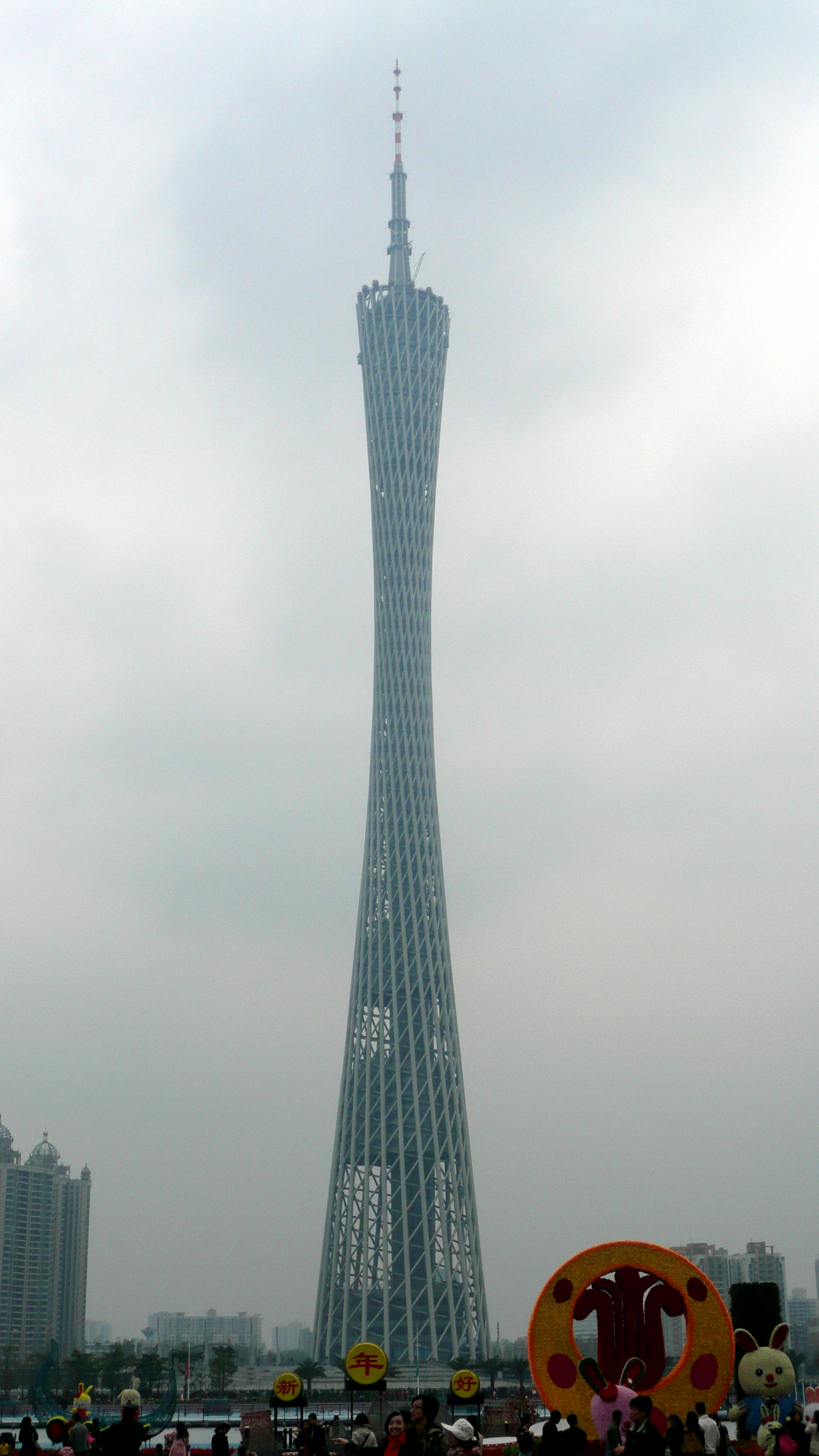
Post-construction – March 2011

=== Diagrams ===
Comparison of the Canton Tower with the world's seven tallest towers

Outline of the Canton Tower.

Diagram of the world's tallest buildings and structures.

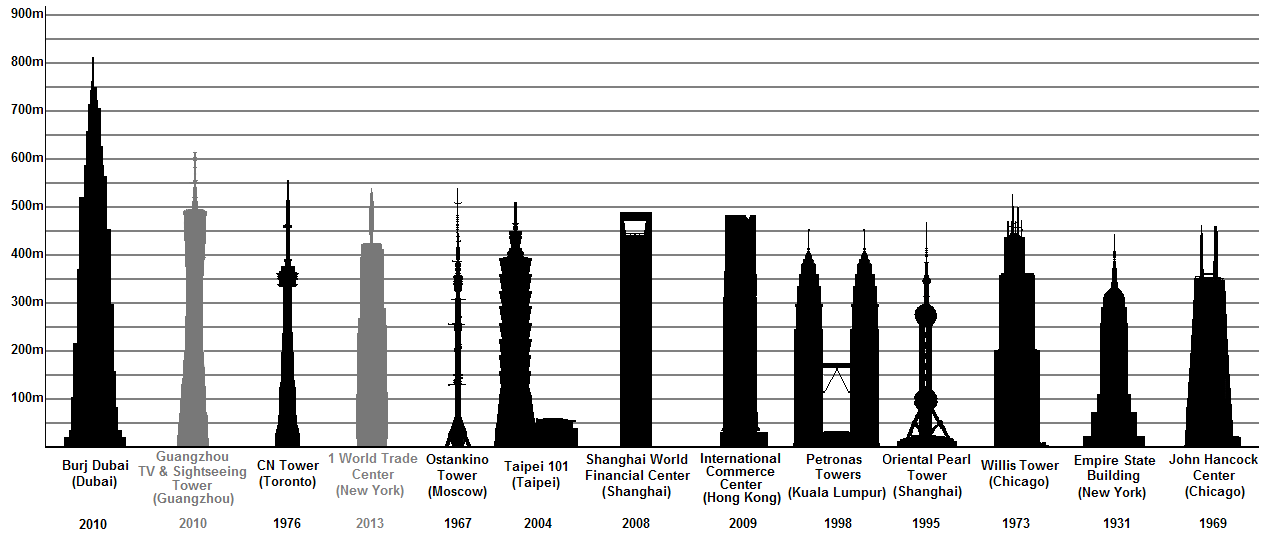
Diagram of the world's tallest buildings and structures with public observation facilities.

== See also ==
- 2010 Asian Games
- 2010 Asian Para Games
- Cantonese architecture
- Guangzhou Broadcasting Network
- Guangzhou TV Tower
- List of hyperboloid structures
- List of tallest freestanding structures in the world
- List of tallest structures in China
- List of tallest towers in the world

Records
Preceded by CN Tower	World's tallest free-standing tower 2009–2011	Succeeded by Tokyo Skytree
