= Mark Hemel =

Dutch architect and designer

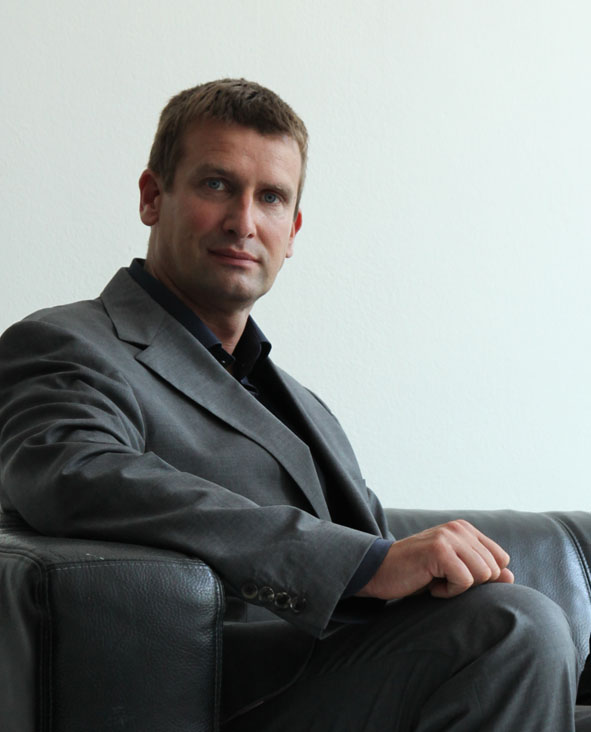
Hemel in 2010

Mark Hemel (born 1966 in Emmen, Netherlands) is a Dutch architect and designer, and co-founder (with Barbara Kuit) of the Amsterdam-based architectural practice Information Based Architecture. He is one of the architects of the Canton Tower in Guangzhou.

== Personal views ==
According to Hemel's discussion with Humans of Architecture, his focus is on "global architecture". His main interest being the expression and development of contemporary culture. In his view, architecture can play an important and positive role in shedding light on potential routes global culture could take.

Hemel stated, "the next generation of planners, architects and designers will have to get used to thinking big, so making reference to big environmental challenges and major expected world population dynamics. Architects in particular will find themselves less and less powerful. We therefore have to focus on making our work more "information based" or we might get side-lined and more and more irrelevant".

He aims for "biological intelligence" to be introduced in the architecture and planning professions. Hemel is working on a book in which the term "biological intelligence" will be introduced.

== Influences ==
Hemel was educated by American theorist Jeffrey Kipnis and UK architect Zaha Hadid as well as Dutch architects Herman Herzberger and Carel Weeber. He was particularly influenced by the books of Richard Dawkins (The Selfish Gene 1976), Kevin Kelly (Out of Control 1995), Ilya Prigogine (Order Out of Chaos 1984), and Douglas Hofstadter (Gödel, Escher, Bach). After his post graduate studies at the Architectural Association in London, Mark began teaching at the AA.

Besides an interest for everything that evolved or subconsciously developed, Mark also takes interest in mathematics and geometry. During his studies in Delft, he pursued mathematical courses in chaos theory. The reason for his interest in chaos theory is that it seems to explain why Modernism is doomed to lead to disaster, and that the alternative "synthesis and integration" bears much more prospect.

"In contemporary architecture you see lots of forms that refer to nothing. And indeed, we want to make designs that are more 'informed'."

Hemel was chosen as one of Design-Build Network's "New Young Architects to Watch for 2010".

== Early life ==
Mark Hemel was born in 1966 in Emmen, Netherlands. Hemel graduated in 1993 from the Delft University of Technology, as well as the Architectural Association in the Graduate Design Program in the year 1996. After his studies in the Netherlands, he received a scholarship for a 1-year research project in Africa and Asia from the Netherlands Foundation for Visual Arts, Design and Architecture. During this year he travelled through Ghana, Burkina Faso, Mali, Senegal, India, and Indonesia concentrating his research on organic city-developments. Beside this he also became keen to vernacular tactics to cope with the environmental circumstances which he came across in Africa and Asia. His studies focused on the Dogon people of Mali, the cities of Djenne, the people on the island of Nias, Indonesia, and the southern temple cities of India.

Hemel worked and lived the first 9 years (1995–2003) of his professional life in London, United Kingdom. In 2003 he returned to the Netherlands to set up his practice in Amsterdam.

== Career ==
Hemel is a tutor and educator. He has been a Unit-master at the Architectural Association in London from 1999 to 2008, and design-tutor of the post-graduate Environment and Energy program at the AA in London, since 2002. Over these years, he experimented with developing performance-based architectural projects. In 2003 Hemel was awarded the RIBA tutor prize.

Hemel is a member of the do-group; an international inter-disciplinary research-group and participates in the Performing Arts Labs; a UK-based architectural research group sponsored by the United Kingdom's National Endowment for Science Technology and the Arts.

Hemel is registered as an architect at the Stichting Bureau Architectenregister, The Hague, Netherlands.

== Professional practice ==
Hemel co-founded the firm 'Information Based Architecture' together with his partner Barbara Kuit in 1998 while they were still based in London. The office is called "information based" in order to clearly break with the common state of architecture at that time that was producing modernist architects. In 2003, they moved their office to Amsterdam while they focus their work Europe, China and Africa. They have won several competitions, including the design for the 600 metres (2,000 ft) tall Canton Tower.

== Publications and reference material ==
Hemel and Kuit's work was shortlisted for the Young Architects of the Year Award in the United Kingdom. They have received support by the Dutch Department of Trade and Industry and received several encouragement grants by the Netherlands Foundation for Visual Arts, Design and Architecture.

Hemel is the author of a book entitled Supermodel, the making of the world's tallest TV tower (2011).
