= Guangzhou TV Tower =

Telecommunications tower in Guangzhou, China

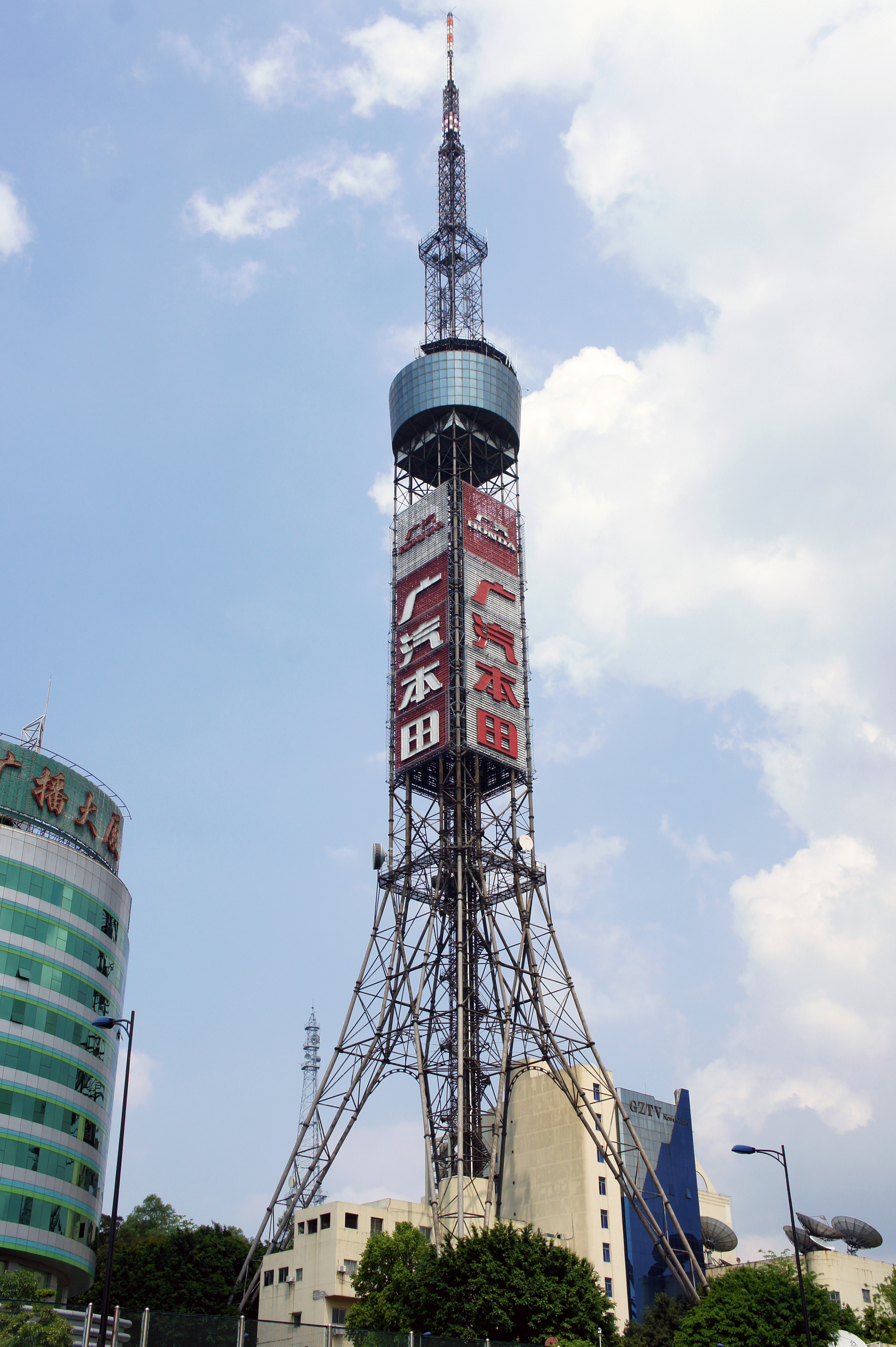

- Location within China

General information
- Coordinates: 23.1472°N 113.2630°E
- Completed: 1991

Height
- Antenna spire: 217 m (712 ft)
- Roof: 160 m (520 ft)

Technical details
- Floor count: 3

Guangzhou TV Tower is a 217-metre (712 ft) lattice telecommunication tower in the southern Chinese city of Guangzhou with an observation deck, erected in 1991.

A newer 618-metre (2,028 ft) tower was completed in Guangzhou in October 2010, named Canton Tower that initially bore the name Guangzhou TV and Sightseeing Tower. It features observation decks on floors 107 and 108.
