= Tokyo Skytree =

Broadcasting and observation tower in Japan

- 東京スカイツリー

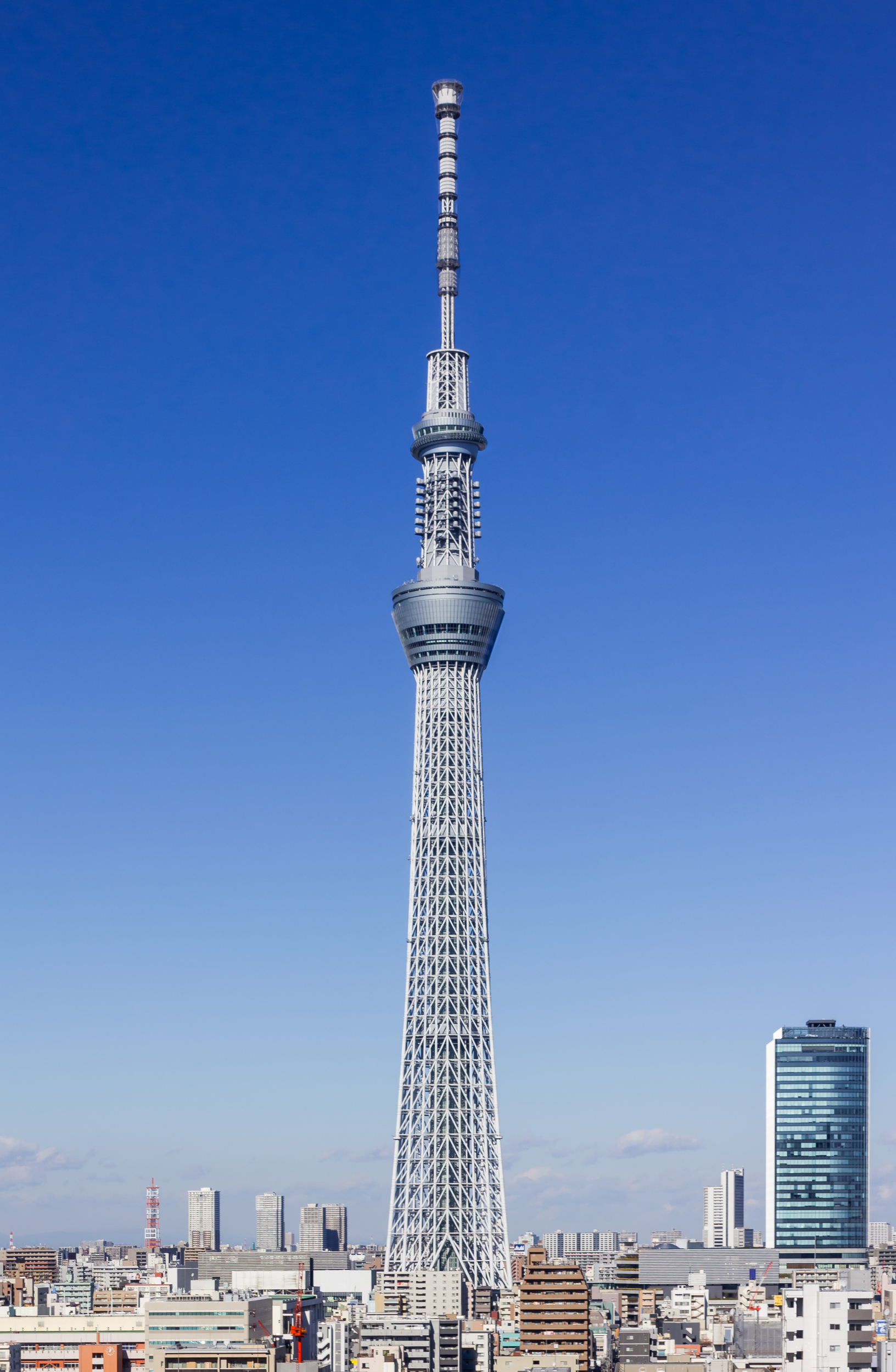
- Tokyo Skytree in 2014

General information
- Status: Completed
- Architectural style: Neo-futurism
- Location: Sumida, Tokyo, Japan
- Coordinates: 35.7101°N 139.8107°E
- Construction started: 14 July 2008; 18 years ago
- Topped-out: 18 March 2011; 15 years ago
- Completed: 29 February 2012; 14 years ago
- Opened: 22 May 2012; 14 years ago
- Cost: 65 billion JPY
- Owner: Tobu Railway through Tobu Tower Skytree Co., Ltd., a wholly owned subsidiary

Height
- Antenna spire: 634.0 m (2,080 ft)
- Roof: 495.2 m (1,625 ft)
- Top floor: 451.3 m (1,481 ft)

Technical details
- Lifts/elevators: 13

Design and construction
- Architect: Nikken Sekkei
- Developer: Tobu Railway
- Main contractor: Obayashi Corporation

Website
- tokyo-skytree.jp

Tokyo Skytree (東京スカイツリー, Tōkyō Sukaitsurī; [tò̞ó̞.kʲjó̞ó̞ (|) sɯ̥̈.kä́í.t͡sɯ̈́.ɾʲíì, tó̞ó̞.-]), a.k.a Tokyo Sky Tree, is a broadcasting and observation tower, located in Sumida, Tokyo, Japan. It has been the tallest tower in Japan since opening in 2012, and reached its full height of 634 m (2,080 ft) in early 2011, making it the tallest tower in the world, displacing the Canton Tower, and the third tallest structure in the world behind Merdeka 118 (678.9 m (2,227 ft) and Burj Khalifa (829.8 m or 2,722 ft). (Note: It was the second tallest structure in the world before the completion of Merdeka 118.)

The tower is the primary television and radio broadcast site for the Kantō region; the older Tokyo Tower no longer gives complete digital terrestrial television broadcasting coverage because it is surrounded by high-rise buildings. Skytree was completed on Leap Day, 29 February 2012, with the tower opening to the public on 22 May 2012. The tower is the centerpiece of a large commercial development funded by Tobu Railway (which owns the complex) and a group of six terrestrial broadcasters headed by NHK. Trains stop at the adjacent Tokyo Skytree Station and nearby Oshiage Station. The complex is seven km (4.3 mi) northeast of Tokyo Station. Sumida Aquarium is in the Tokyo Solamachi complex.

== Design ==
The tower's design was published on 24 November 2006, based on the following three concepts:

- Fusion of neofuturistic design and the traditional beauty of Japan
- Catalyst for revitalization of the city
- Contribution to disaster prevention – "Safety and Security"

The base of the tower has a structure similar to a tripod; from a height of about 350 m (1,150 ft) and above, the tower's structure is cylindrical to offer panoramic views of the river and the city. There are observatories at 350 m (1,150 ft), with a capacity of up to 2,000 people, and 450 m (1,480 ft), with a capacity of 900 people. The upper observatory features a spiral, glass-covered skywalk in which visitors ascend the last 5 m (16 ft) to the highest point at the upper platform. A section of glass flooring gives visitors a direct downward view of the streets below.

=== Earthquake resistance ===
The tower has seismic proofing, including a central shaft made of reinforced concrete. The main internal pillar is attached to the outer tower structure for the first 125 m (410 ft) above ground. From there until 375 m (1,230 ft), the pillar is attached to the tower frame with oil dampers, which act as cushions during an earthquake. Additional resilience is achieved through an "added mass control mechanism" (or tuned mass damper) – a damping system which, in the event of an earthquake, moves out of step with the building's structure, to keep the center of gravity as central as possible to the tower's base. According to the designers, the dampers can absorb 50 percent of the energy from an earthquake.

=== Color ===
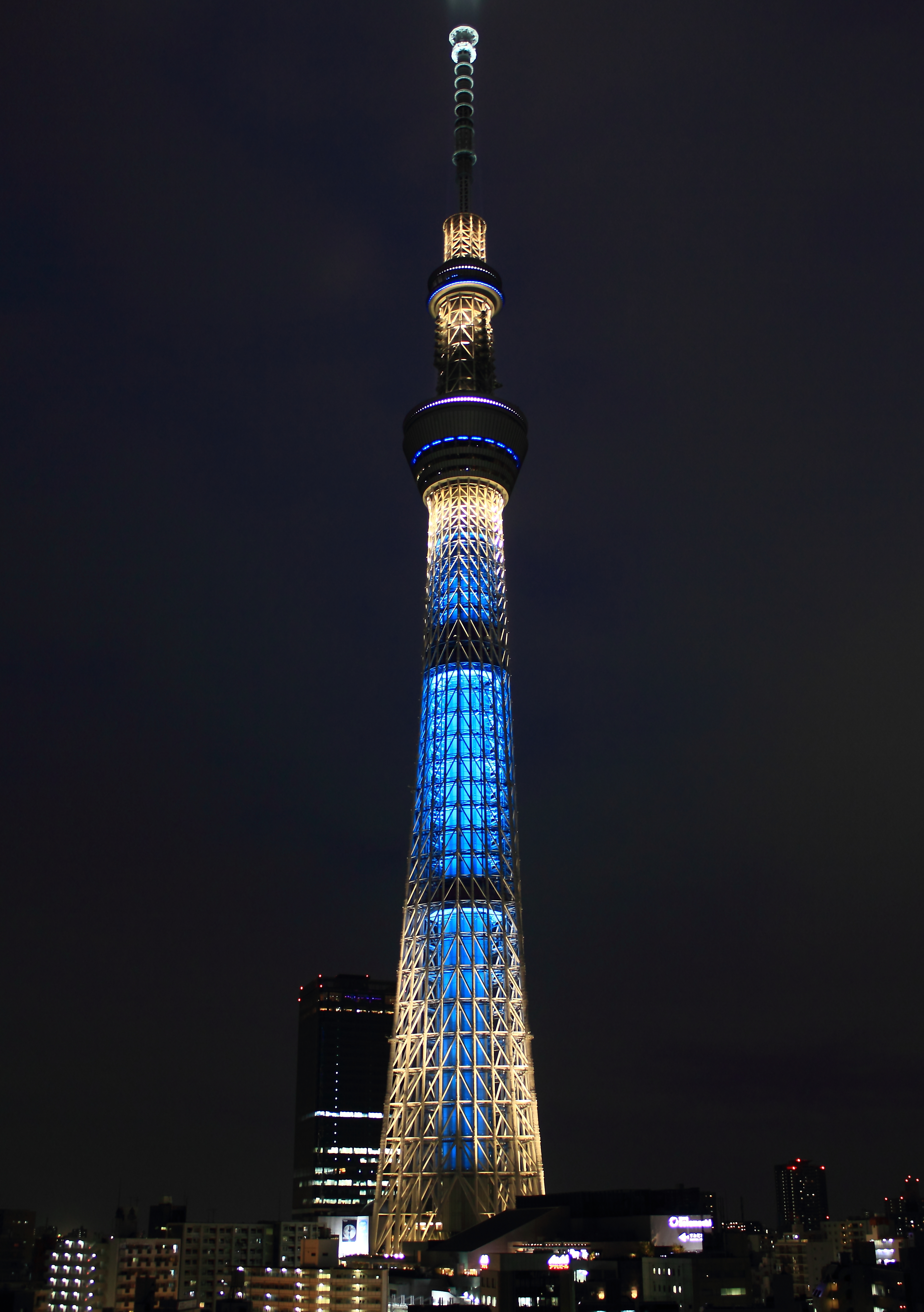
Iki

Miyabi

The exterior lattice is painted a color officially called "Skytree White". This is an original color based on a bluish-white traditional Japanese color called aijiro (藍白).

=== Illumination ===
The illumination design was published on 16 October 2009. Two illumination patterns alternate daily. One is the sky blue Iki (chic, stylish), and the other is the purple Miyabi (elegance, refinement). The tower is illuminated using LEDs.

== Naming and height ==
The cross-section of the tower forms an equilateral triangle on the ground, gradually rounding to become circular at 320 m elevation.

From October to November 2007, suggestions were collected from the general public for the name to be given to the tower. On 19 March 2008, a committee chose six final candidate names: Tōkyō Sukaitsurī (東京スカイツリー; "Tokyo sky tree"), Tōkyō Edo Tawā (東京EDOタワー; "Tokyo Edo tower"), Raijingu Tawā (ライジングタワー; "Rising tower"), Mirai Tawā (みらいタワー; "Tower of the future"), Yumemi Yagura (ゆめみやぐら; "Dream lookout"), Raijingu Īsuto Tawā (ライジングイーストタワー; "Rising east tower"). The official name was decided in a nationwide vote, and was announced on 10 June 2008 as "Tokyo Skytree". The name received around 33,000 votes (30%) out of 110,000 cast, with the second most popular name being "Tokyo Edo Tower".

The height of 634 m (2,080 ft) was selected to be easily remembered based on numeric substitution. The figures 6 (mu), 3 (sa), 4 (shi) stand for "Musashi", an old name for the region where the Tokyo Skytree stands.

== Broadcasting use ==
Tokyo Skytree is used as a radio/television broadcast and communications tower.

=== Television broadcasters ===
LCN	Channel number	Channel name	Callsign	Signal power	ERP	Broadcast area
1	27ch	NHK General TV	JOAK-DTV	10 kW	68 kW	Kantō region
2	26ch	NHK Educational TV	JOAB-DTV	10 kW	68 kW	Kantō region
4	25ch	Nippon Television	JOAX-DTV	10 kW	69 kW	Kantō region
5	24ch	TV Asahi	JOEX-DTV	10 kW	69 kW	Kantō region
6	22ch	TBS Television	JORX-DTV	10 kW	69 kW	Kantō region
7	23ch	TV Tokyo	JOTX-DTV	10 kW	69 kW	Kantō region
8	21ch	Fuji Television	JOCX-DTV	10 kW	69 kW	Kantō region
9	16ch	Tokyo MX	JOMX-DTV	3 kW	11.5 kW	Tokyo

=== Radio broadcasters ===
Frequency	Station name	Callsign	Power	ERP	Broadcast area
81.3 MHz	J-Wave Tokyo	JOAV-FM	7 kW	57 kW	Tokyo
82.5 MHz	NHK FM Broadcast Tokyo	JOAK-FM	7 kW	57 kW	Tokyo
90.5 MHz	TBS Radio Tokyo Sumida FM relay	JOKR	7 kW	57 kW	Kantō region
91.6 MHz	Nippon Cultural Broadcasting Sumida FM relay	JOQR	7 kW	57 kW	Kantō region
93.0 MHz	Nippon Broadcasting System Sumida FM relay	JOLF	7 kW	57 kW	Kantō region

Comparison of the Tokyo Skytree with the world's seven tallest towers

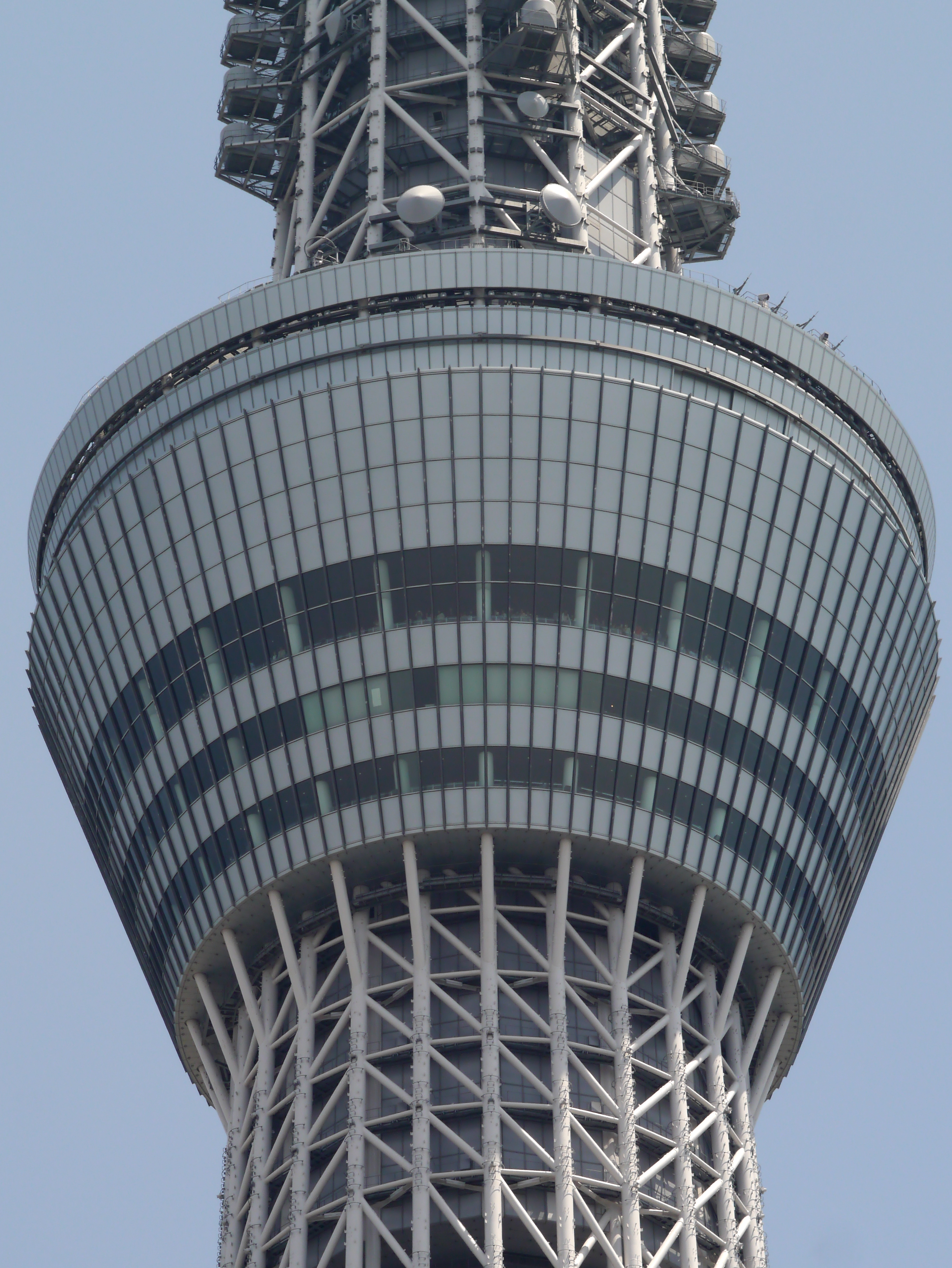
Main pod

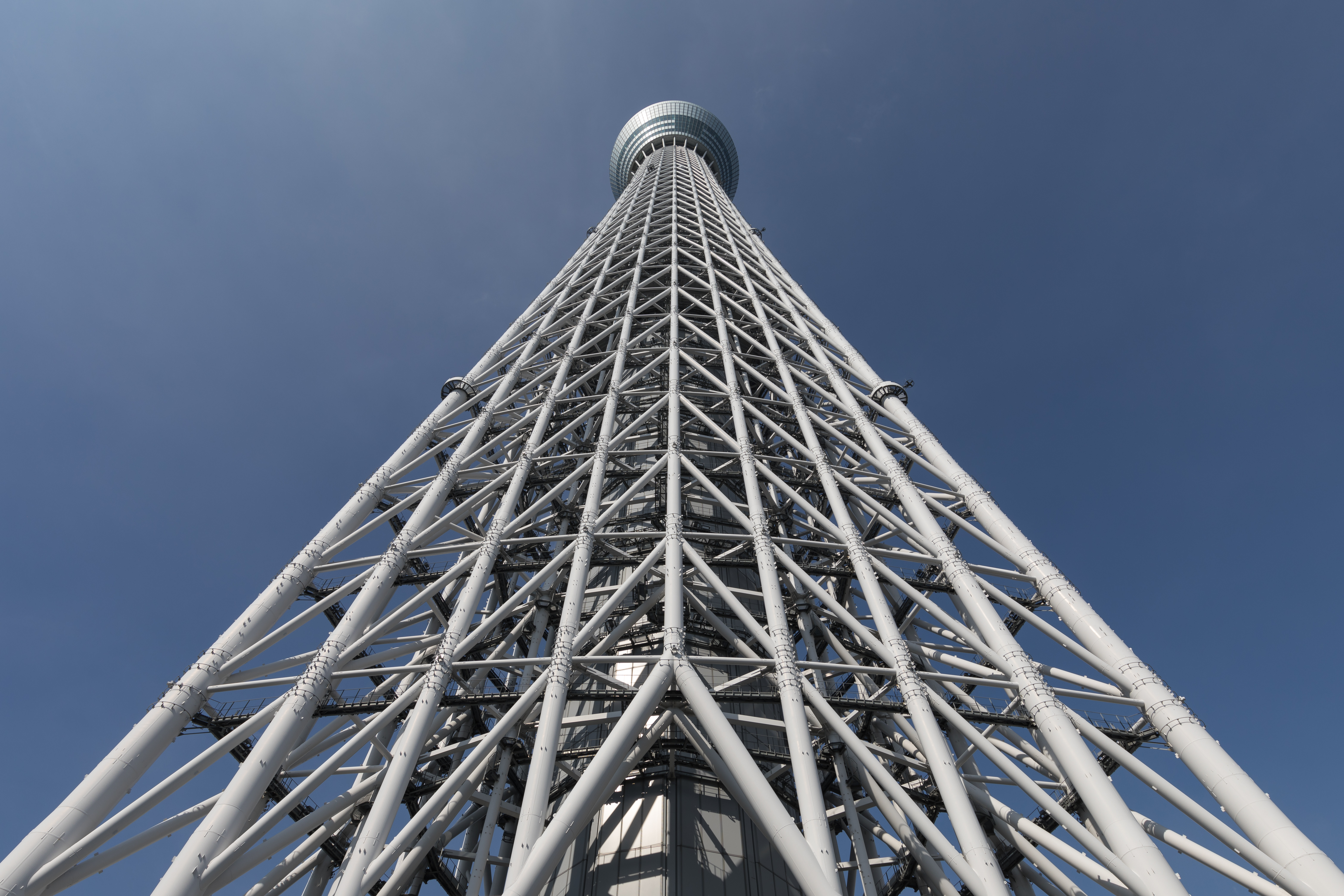
Worm's-eye view of Tokyo Skytree, a sunny day

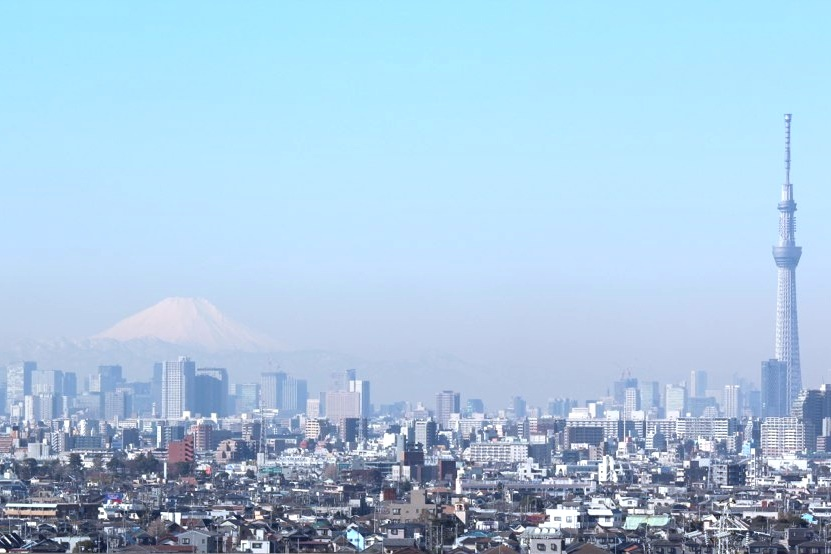
Mount Fuji and the tower, seen from Chiba

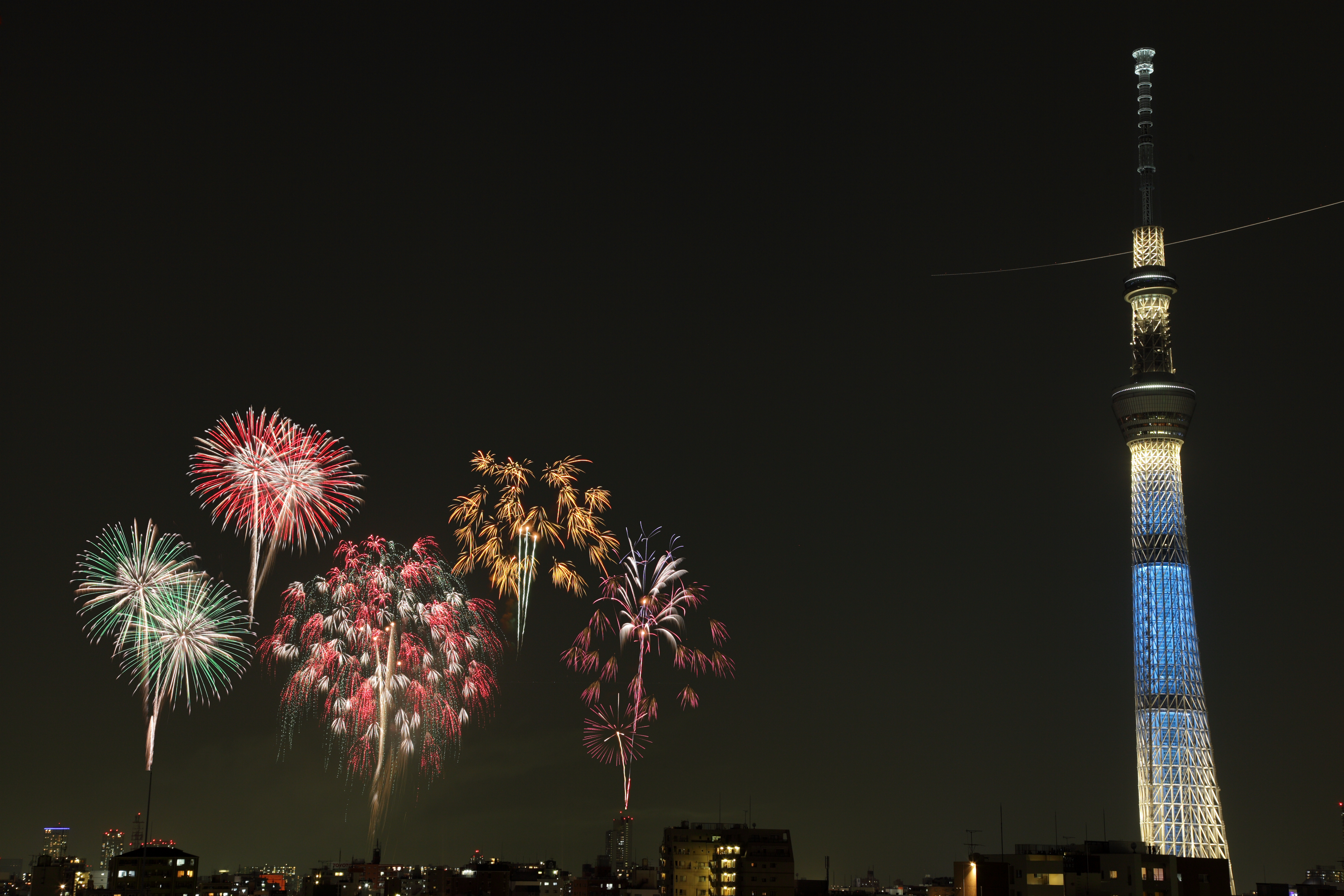
Sumidagawa Fireworks Festival

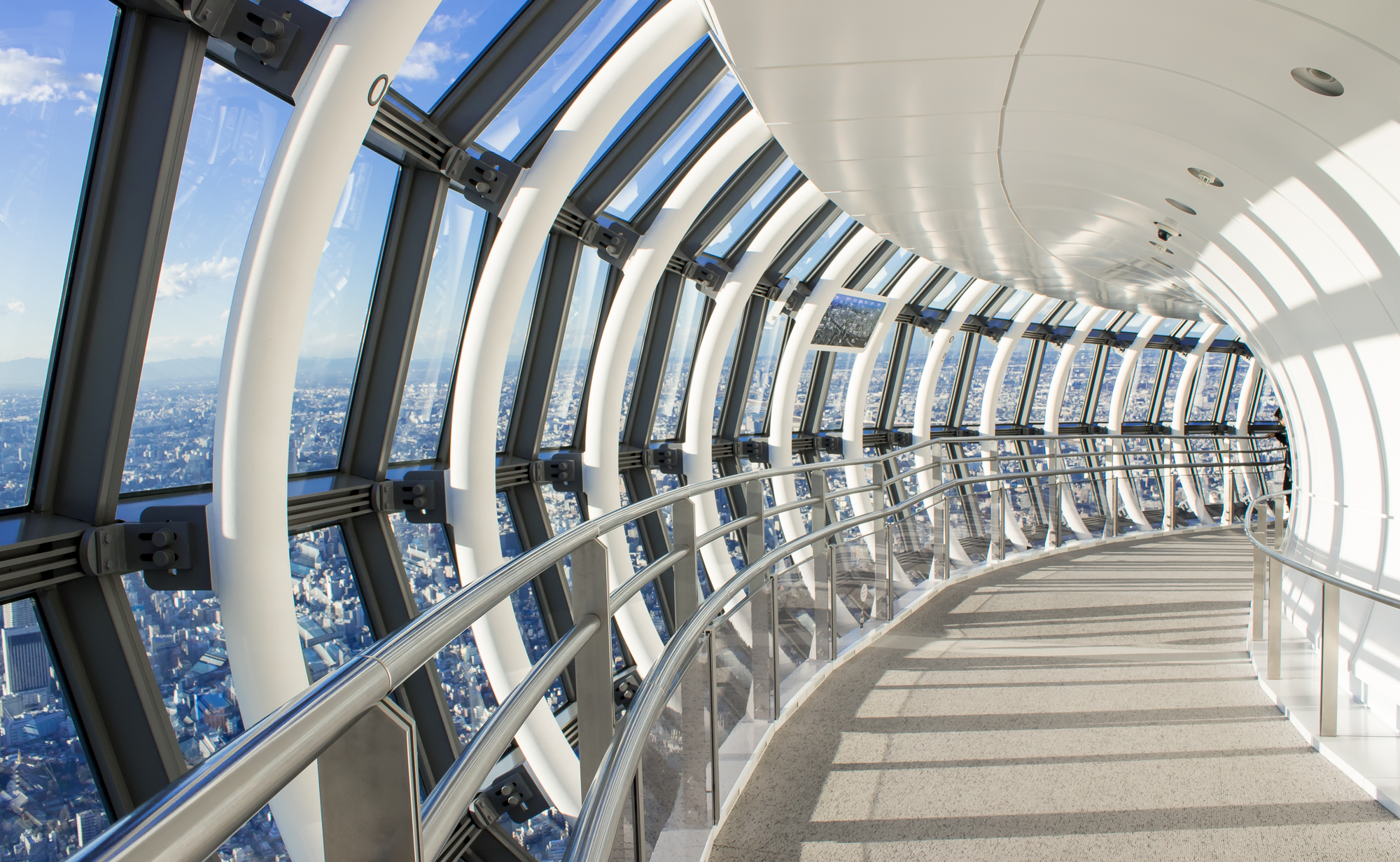
Tokyo Skytree Observation Deck

== Timeline ==
=== 2008 ===
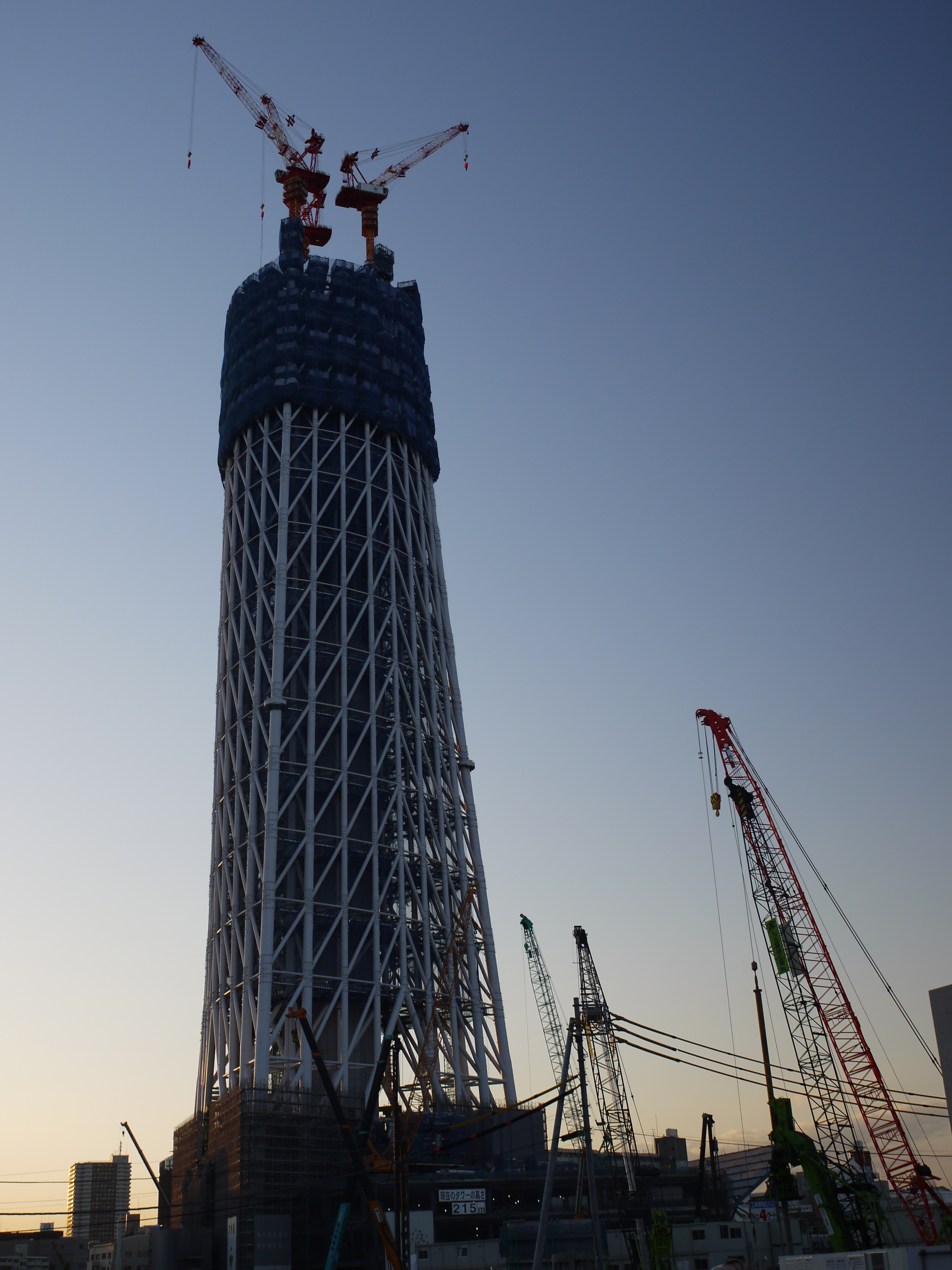
Tokyo Skytree under construction in November 2009

- 14 July 2008: A ceremony was held at the site to mark the start of construction.

=== 2009 ===
- 6 April 2009: The foundations for the three main legs were completed.
- 7 August 2009: The tower reached a height of 100 m.
- 16 October 2009: The projected height was increased from 610 to 634 m (2,001 to 2,080 ft) to make it the highest self-supporting steel tower. Also, 6-3-4 is Mu-sa-shi in Japanese wordplay goroawase.
- 10 November 2009: The tower reached a height of 200 m.

=== 2010 ===
- 16 February 2010: The tower reached a height of 300 m (980 ft).
- 29 March 2010: The tower reached a height of 338 m (1,109 ft), becoming the tallest structure in Japan.
- 24 April 2010: A 1:25 scale model of the Tokyo Skytree was unveiled at the Tobu World Square theme park in Nikkō, Tochigi.
- 30 July 2010: The tower topped 400 m (1,300 ft), reaching a height of 413 m (1,355 ft).
- 11 September 2010: The tower reached 461 m (1,512 ft), becoming the tallest structure ever built in Japan, surpassing the dismantled Tsushima Omega tower of 455 m (1,493 ft).
- 23 October 2010: The tower reached a height of 497 m (1,631 ft), and assembly of the main tower section was completed.
- 20 November 2010: Two tuned mass dampers with a total weight of 100 tons were temporarily placed on the tower tip at 497 m (1,631 ft).
- 1 December 2010: The tower topped the 500 m (1,600 ft) mark and reached a height of 511 m (1,677 ft), beating Taipei 101 (509 m (1,670 ft)). A lightning conductor and two tuned mass dampers were docked to the gain tower, which was gradually lifted within the central shaft.
- 16 December 2010: Ministry of Internal Affairs and Communications approved NHK and five TV key stations in Tokyo's plans to install their broadcasting facilities on the tower.
- 18 December 2010: The transmitting antenna for digital terrestrial television began to be installed.

=== 2011 ===
- 1 March 2011: The tower reached a height of 602 m (1,975 ft), surpassing Canton Tower and becoming the world's tallest tower.
- 12 March 2011: The tower reached a height of 625 m (2,051 ft). A full inspection was made, looking for possible damage by the 2011 Tōhoku earthquake and its aftershocks.
- 18 March 2011: The tower reached its final height of 634 m (2,080 ft) at 1:34 pm JST.
- 23 May 2011: Dismantling four tower cranes continues until mid-July.
- 7 June 2011: Announced public opening date of Tokyo Skytree Town and entrance fee (Adults: 2,000 yen to 350 m (1,150 ft) level; extra 1,000 yen to 450 m (1,480 ft) level) to observation floors.
- 17 November 2011: Guinness World Records certified the Tokyo Skytree as the tallest free-standing tower.

=== 2012 ===
- 16 February 2012: The roofs of warehouses close to the tower were damaged by falling snow and ice from the tower.
- 29 February 2012: Tower construction was finished. Completion was delayed two months from the original schedule because of a shortage of supplies due to the effects of the 2011 Japanese earthquake and tsunami.
- 2 March 2012: A ceremony was held to celebrate the completion with a kannushi priest and 70 people from Tobu Group, construction, broadcasting and other companies.
- 6 March 2012: First Light-up during the Tokyo Hotaru Festival
- 26 April 2012: Emperor Akihito and Empress Michiko of Japan inspected the Tokyo Skytree Tembo Galleria.
- 22 May 2012: Public opening of Tokyo Skytree
- 1 October 2012: Channel 9 Tokyo MX start transmission from Tokyo Skytree with continuing transmission from Tokyo Tower in simulcast manner.

=== 2013 ===
- 16 January 2013: Snow falling from the tower knocked a hole in the roof of a nearby house. No one was reported injured.
- 13 May 2013: Tokyo MX continued transmission from Tokyo Skytree and stopped transmission from Tokyo Tower with a gradual decrease in power since 12 November 2012.
- 31 May 2013: On 9:00 a.m., formal transmission of broadcast in channel 1 to 8, except 3, start from Tokyo Skytree after number of test transmission with off for minutes to hours from Tokyo Tower since 22 December 2012.

=== 2022 ===
- 22 May 2022: the 10th anniversary of the opening of Tokyo Skytree was celebrated with Kabuki by Ichikawa Ebizo XI who performed a signature technique called the "nirami" glare on a special stage atop of the tower.

== Opening ==
As the Skytree's opening approached, people reportedly waited in line for a week to get tickets. By the opening, trips up the tower were fully booked for the first two months of operation. The opening day drew a crowd of tens of thousands, despite rainy conditions which blocked the view from the tower's observation deck. Strong winds also forced two elevators to be shut down, leaving some visitors briefly stranded on the observation deck.

According to Tobu, 1.6 million people visited Skytree in its first week. Local residents then reported that the influx of visitors disturbed the peace of their community and generated little economic benefit for the local area.

== Gallery ==
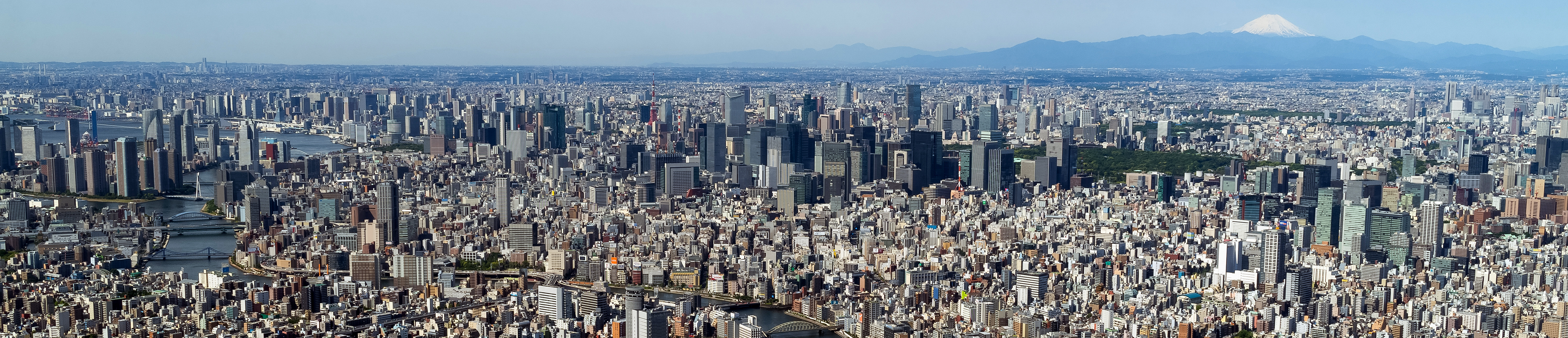
Panoramic view of Tokyo from Tokyo Skytree

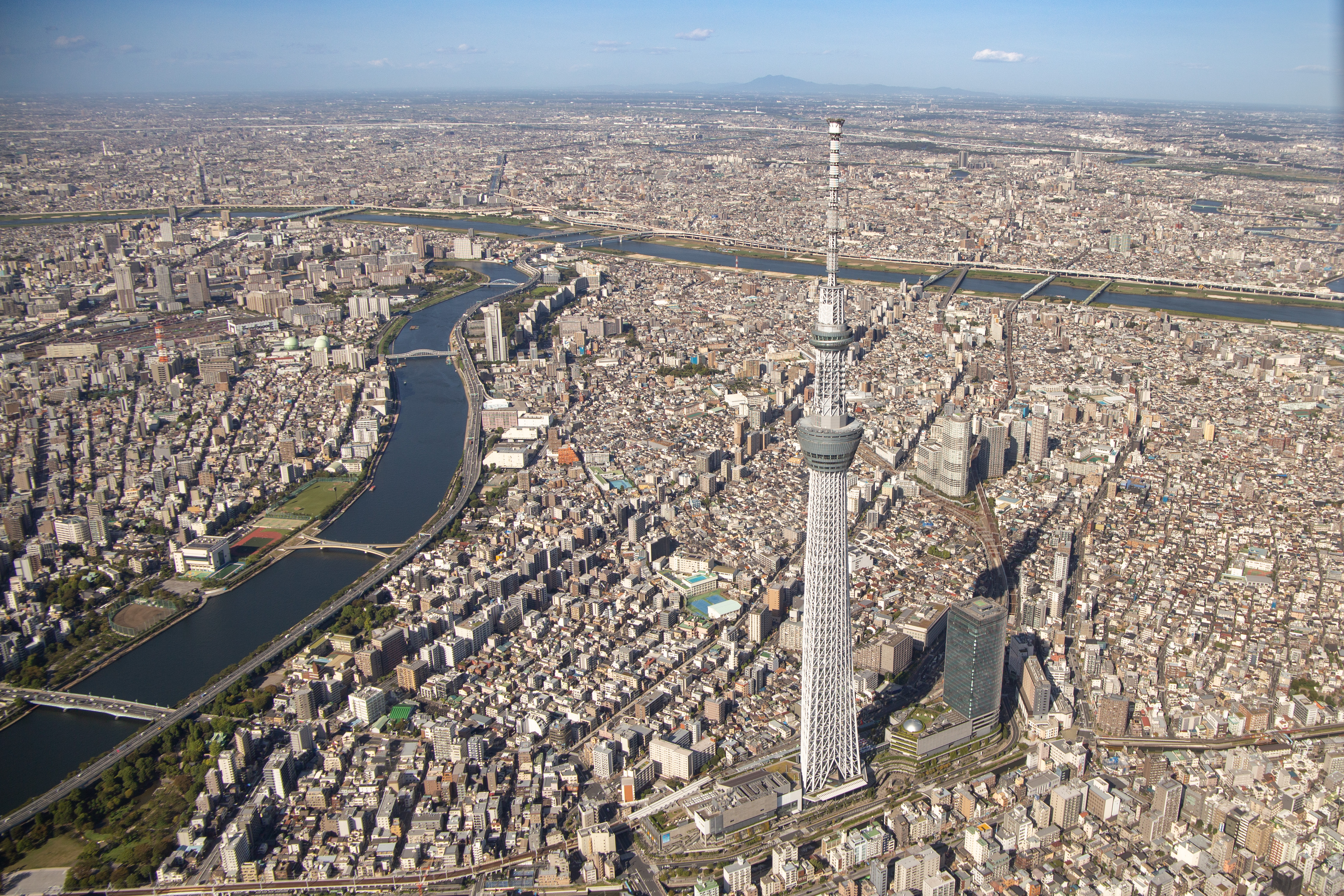
Aerial view of Tokyo Skytree October 2023

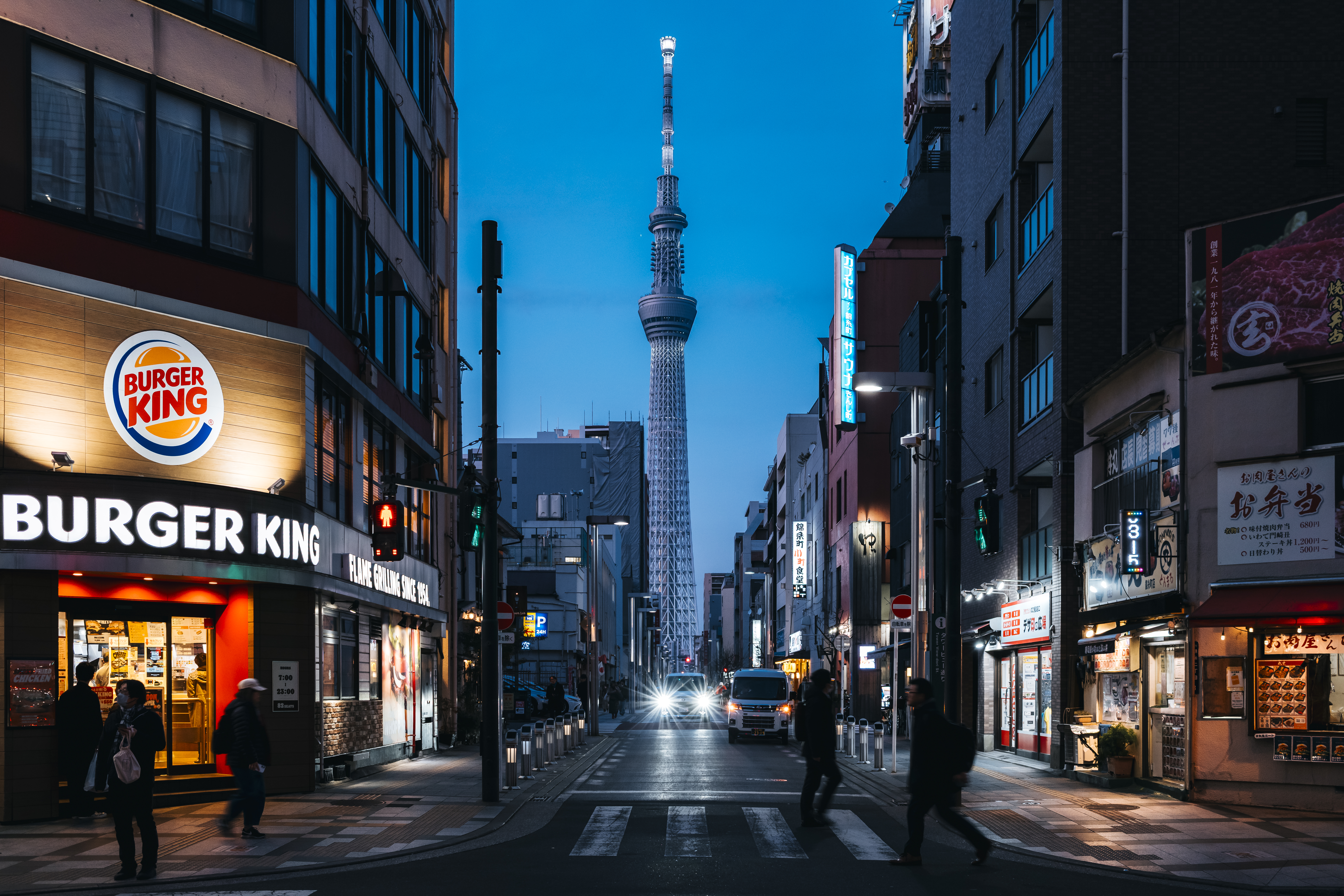
Tokyo Skytree seen at night from Kinshicho in February 2026

== See also ==
- List of tallest freestanding structures
- List of transmission sites
- Sky City 1000
- Lattice tower
- CN Tower

== Notes ==
Records
Preceded by KVLY-TV mast	World's tallest tower 2011–present	Incumbent
Preceded by Canton Tower	World's tallest free-standing tower 2011–present	Incumbent
