= Guangzhou Water Bus =

Water taxi in Guangzhou, China

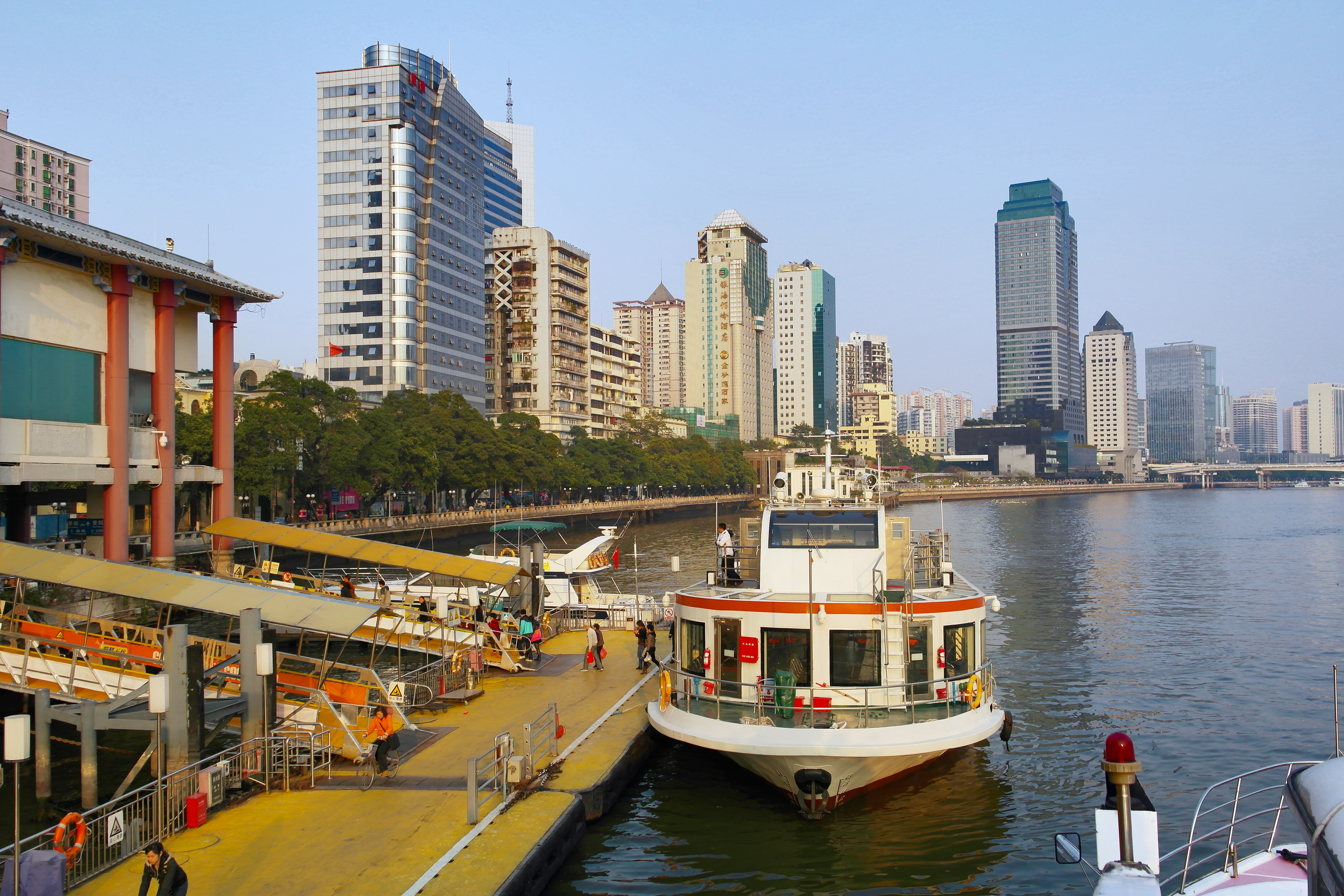
- A water bus near Tianzi Wharf
- Locale: Guangzhou, China
- Waterway: Pearl River
- Transit type: Water taxi
- Operator: GPT Liner Co., Ltd
- Began operation: 10 April 2007
- System length: 53.46 km
- No. of lines: 12
- No. of vessels: 46
- Website: http://www.prol.com.cn/

The Guangzhou Water Bus (Chinese: 广州水上巴士; pinyin: Guǎngzhōu Shuǐshàng Bāshì; Jyutping: Gwong²zau¹ Seoi⁶soeng6 Baa¹si²) is the short distance ferry and medium to long distance passenger liner services of Guangzhou, China operated by Guangzhou Public Transport Group Liner Co., Ltd (Chinese: 广州公交集团客轮有限公司). The Water Bus services, succeeding the Bus, Taxi, and Metro, is the fourth public transport system in the city. As per January 2020, the Water Bus system has 12 routes, 35 piers and a fleet of 46 ships in operation.

== History ==
The city has a long established ferry service crossing the Pearl River. Medium to long distance passenger liner services, Water Bus, was introduced on 10 April 2007 following the trial operation of route S1 between Fangcun and Zhongda (Sun Yat-sen University). The journey was free during the three-day trial period, and attracted 36,483 passengers.

In September 2013, 7 additional routes (S2-S6, S11-S12) were opened, new destinations including Canton Tower, Jinshazhou, Changzhou were brought into the network.

In February 2014, all routes are air-conditioned. Ticket prices for short ferry services increased from ¥0.5 to ¥1, and for longer distance journeys cap at ¥5.

In late 2014, some routes were adjusted and merged, and new route was opened between Nanpu Island and Huangsha.

From May 2016, following the criticism of low passenger volume and continuous loss, Liner Company debuted the new on-demand services 'Ruyue' (Chinese: 如约定制航线). Passengers can book journey mobile app. The service will only operate when there are sufficient bookings.

== Routes ==
| Route | Destinations | Fare | Operate Time | Inverval |
|---|---|---|---|---|
| ^{Ruyue}S1 | Jinshazhou - Huangsha 金沙洲 - 黄沙 | ¥10 | Weekdays by reservations only. from Jinshazhou: 7:00, 8:00, 17:00, 18:00 from Huangsha: 7:30, 8:30, 17:30, 18:30 | (timetabled) |
| ^{Ruyue}S2 | Fangcun - Xidi - Tianzi - Zhongda 芳村 - 西堤 - 天字 - 中大 | ¥20 | Weekdays by reservations only. 7:00, 8:00, 17:00, 18:00 | (timetabled) |
| S2_{Short} | Tianzi - Zhongda 天字 - 中大 | upper deck: ¥5 lower deck: ¥2 | from Tianzi: 7:30-17:30 from Zhongda: 7:00-17:00 | hourly |
| S4 | Aozhou - Xidi 鳌洲 - 西堤 | ¥2 | from Aozhou: 6:45-20:15 from Xidi: 6:52-20:30 | every 15 minutes |
| S5 | Shenjing - Xinzhou 深井 - 新洲 | ¥1 | from Shenjing: 5:45-21:45 from Xinzhou: 6:00-22:00 | every 30 minutes 7:15-8:15: every 20 minutes 17:40-18:30: every 20 minutes |
| S6 | Huangsha - Fangcun 黄沙 - 芳村 | ¥2 | 6:00-22:00 | every 10 minutes |
| S7 | Tianzi - Fangzhi 天字 - 纺织 | ¥2 | from Tianzi: 6:38-18:52 from Fangzhi: 6:45-19:00 | every 15 minutes |
| S8 | Shengzong - Qiankou 省总 - 堑口 | ¥2 | from Shengzong: 7:08-18:40 from Qiankou: 7:00-18:30 | every 15 minutes |
| S9 | Baixianke - Baihedong 白蚬壳 - 白鹤洞 | ¥2 | from Baixianke: 6:00–19:50 from Baihedong: 6:10–20:00 | every 30 minutes 7:00-8:45: every 20 minutes 17:00-18:40: every 20 minutes |
| S10 | Yuzhu - Changzhou 鱼珠 - 长洲 | ¥2 | from Yuzhu: 5:45-23:50 from Changzhou: 5:45-24:00 | every 15 minutes 7:00-9:00: every 10 minutes 17:00-19:00: every 10 minutes |
| S11 | Haixinsha - Zhongda 海心沙 - 中大 | upper deck: ¥5 lower deck: ¥2 | From Zhongda: 7:30-17:30; From Haixinsha: 8:00-18:00 | every 60 minutes |
| ^{Ruyue} S12 | Changzhou - Yuzhu - Haixinsha 长洲 - 鱼珠 - 海心沙 | upper deck: ¥5 lower deck: ¥3 | By reservations only. from Changzhou: 7:00, 7:30, 8:00 from Haixinsha: 17:30, 18:00, 18:30 | (timetabled) |
| ^{Ruyue} S13 | Nanpu Jinxiubandao - Baixianke - Huangsha 南浦锦绣半岛 - 黄沙 | upper deck: ¥5 lower deck: ¥3 | By reservations only. 7:05-18:25 | every 40 minutes |
| ^{Ruyue} S14 | Shiweitang - Huangsha - Tanwei - Shiweitang 石围塘 - 黄沙 - 坦尾 - 石围塘 (single direction) | ¥2 | By reservations only. 7:00-18:15 | every 45 minutes |
Note: S1, S2, S12, S13 and S14, are Ruyue routes by reservations only, available when more than certain passengers have reserved.

== See also ==
- List of ferries, wharfs and ports in Guangzhou
