= Haixinsha =

Haixinsha may refer to:

- Haixinsha Island (Tianhe District), in Guangzhou, Guangdong, China
- Haixinsha Island (Haizhu District), in Guangzhou, Guangdong, China
