= Guangdong Science Center =

Science center in Guangdong, China

- 广东科学中心
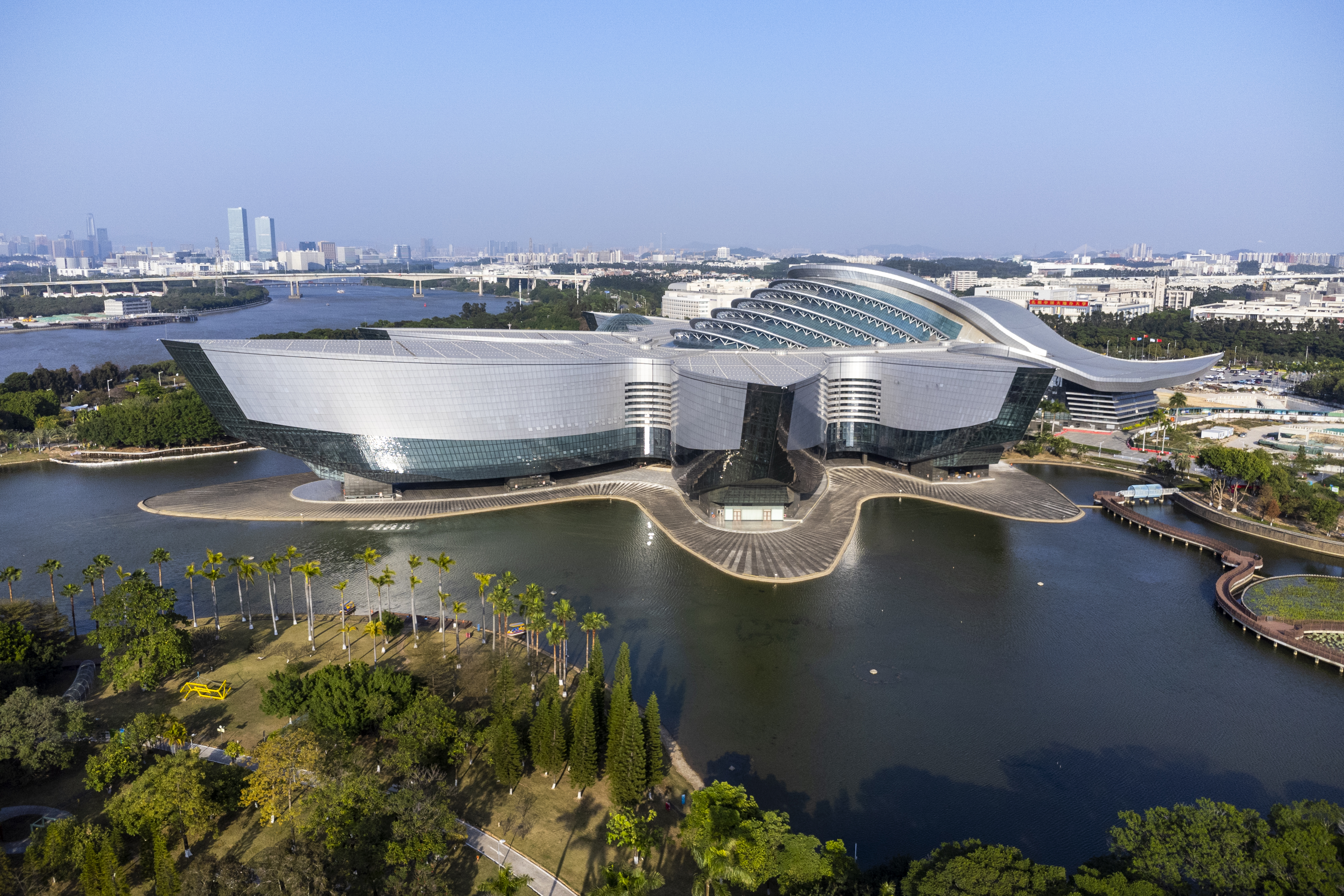
- Guangdong Science Center building
- Established: September 26, 2008
- Location: Guangzhou, Guangdong, China
- Coordinates: 23°02′31″N 113°21′26″E
- Accreditation: Asia Pacific Network of Science & Technology Centres (ASPAC)
- Website: http://www.gdsc.cn/

The Guangdong Science Center (GDSC, Chinese: 广东科学中心) is a major science center established in 2008 in Guangzhou, Guangdong, China.

== Overview ==
The science center is a non-profit organization, located at the west end of Guangzhou Higher Education Mega Center with a land area of 450,000 square metres (540,000 sq yd) and a building floor area of 137,500 square metres (164,400 sq yd). The science center has the slogan of "Get close to Science, Embrace the Future." The science center set the goals of becoming the "First class venue of science activity in the world", "Biggest base of popular science education in Asia" and becoming a "Large platform of technology communication in Guangdong".

== History ==
Costing 1.9 billion yuan, Guangdong Science Center was built within a 5-year period of time. The Lighting Ceremony was held on September 19, 2008, and the opening ceremony was held on September 26, 2008. Guangdong Science Center opened to public on September 27, 2008.

As a member of Asia Pacific Network of Science and Technology Centres (ASPAC), Guangdong Science Center held the Annual Conference in 2011, the Xiaoguwei Science Forum won the 2014 ASPAC Creative Science Communication Award, Eyes on the World exhibition won the 2014 ASPAC Creative Exhibit Award.

== Transportation ==
Bus: No. 35, No. 801, and No. (PAN)202

Metro: Line 4, Line 7 and Line 12 of Guangzhou Metro, then transfer to Bus No. (PAN)202 at Exit D of Higher Education Mega Center South Station.

Intercity railway: Guangzhou Higher Education Mega Center railway station of Guangzhou East Ring intercity railway.

== See also ==
- List of science centers#Asia
