= Dashi East railway station =

Guangdong Intercity railway station in Guangzhou, China

Dashidong 大石东
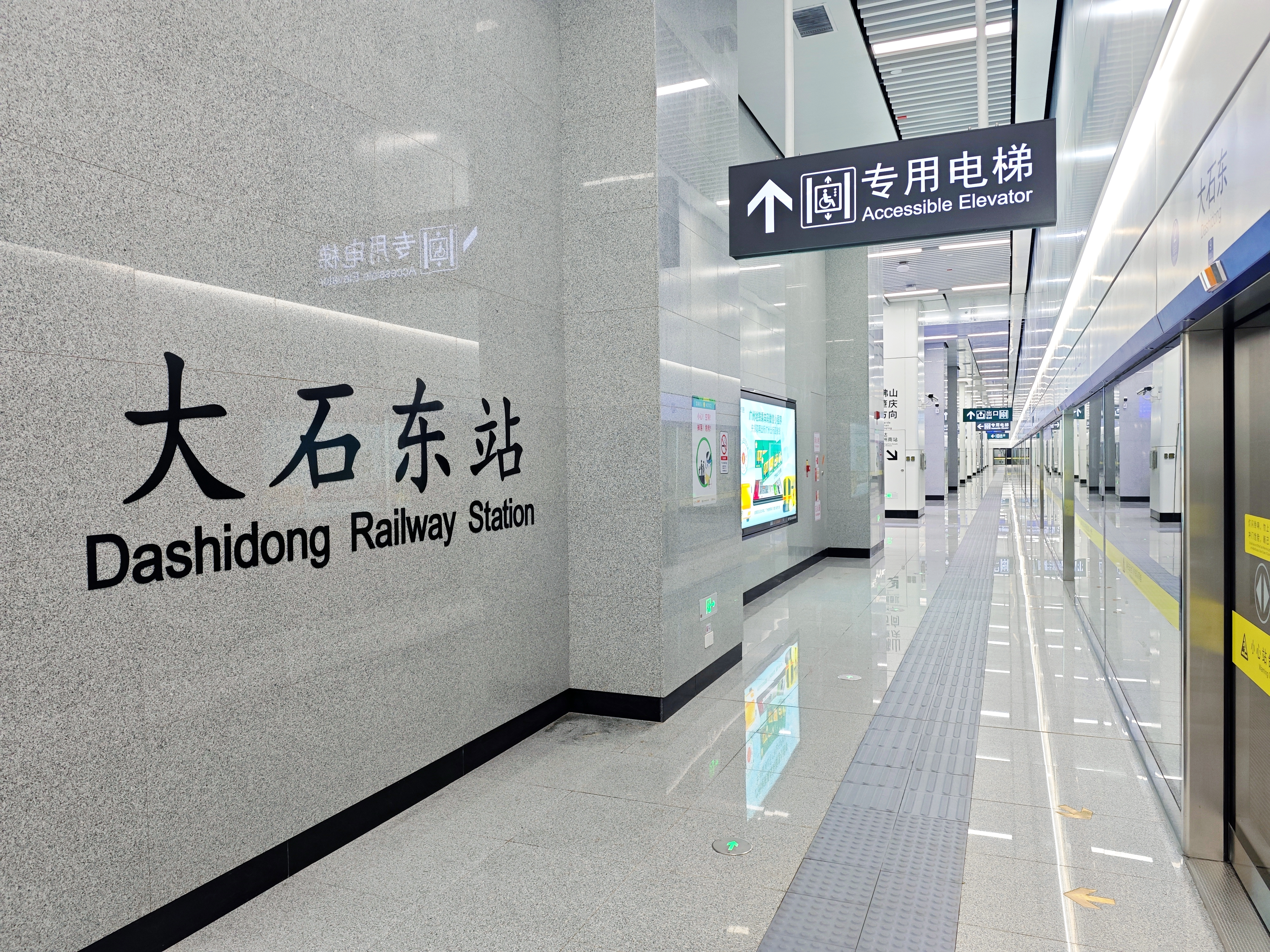
- Platform 2

Chinese name
- Simplified Chinese: 大石东站
- Traditional Chinese: 大石東站
Transcriptions
Standard Mandarin
- Hanyu Pinyin: Dàshí Dōng Zhàn
Yue: Cantonese
- Yale Romanization: Daaihsehk Dūng Jaahm
- Jyutping: Daai^{6}sek^{6} Dung^{1} Zaam^{6}

General information
- Location: Qunxian Road (群贤路) (east side of Xinguang Expressway); Dashi Subdistrict, Panyu District, Guangzhou, Guangdong; China
- Coordinates: 23°1′17.69″N 113°19′8.22″E
- Owner: Pearl River Delta Metropolitan Region intercity railway
- Operator: Guangdong Intercity
- Line: Guangzhou East Ring intercity railway
- Platforms: 2 (1 island platform)
- Tracks: 2
- Connections: 3 Dashi

Construction
- Structure type: Underground
- Accessible: Yes

Other information
- Station code: RHQ (Pinyin: DSD)

History
- Opened: 29 September 2025 (10 months ago)

Services
Preceding station	Pearl River Delta Metropolitan Region Intercity Railway	Following station
Guangzhou Higher Education Mega Center towards Huadu	Guangzhou East Ring intercity railway	Panyu Terminus
Transfer at Dashi
Preceding station	Guangzhou Metro	Following station
Hanxi Changlong towards Haibang	Line 3 transfer at Dashi	Xiajiao towards Airport North (Terminal 2) or Tianhe Coach Terminal
Location

Dashi East railway station (Chinese: 大石东站; pinyin: Dàshí Dōng Zhàn; Cantonese Yale: Daaihsehk Dūng Jaahm) is an underground railway station on Guangzhou East Ring intercity railway located in Panyu District, Guangzhou, Guangdong, China. It opened on 29 September 2025.

== Features ==
The station has an underground island platform. It also has an emergency exit, 2 wind shafts and a cooling tower.

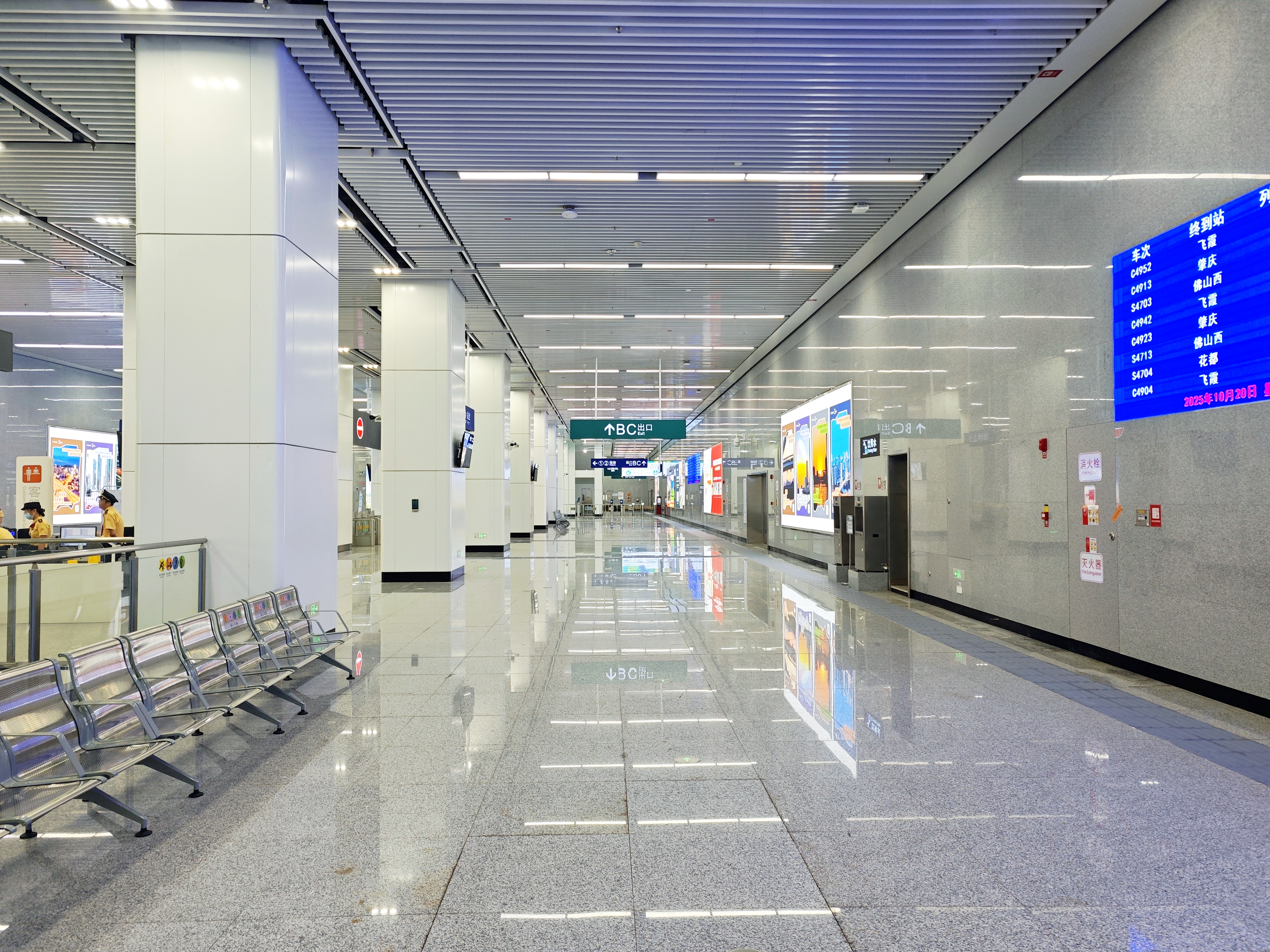
Concourse

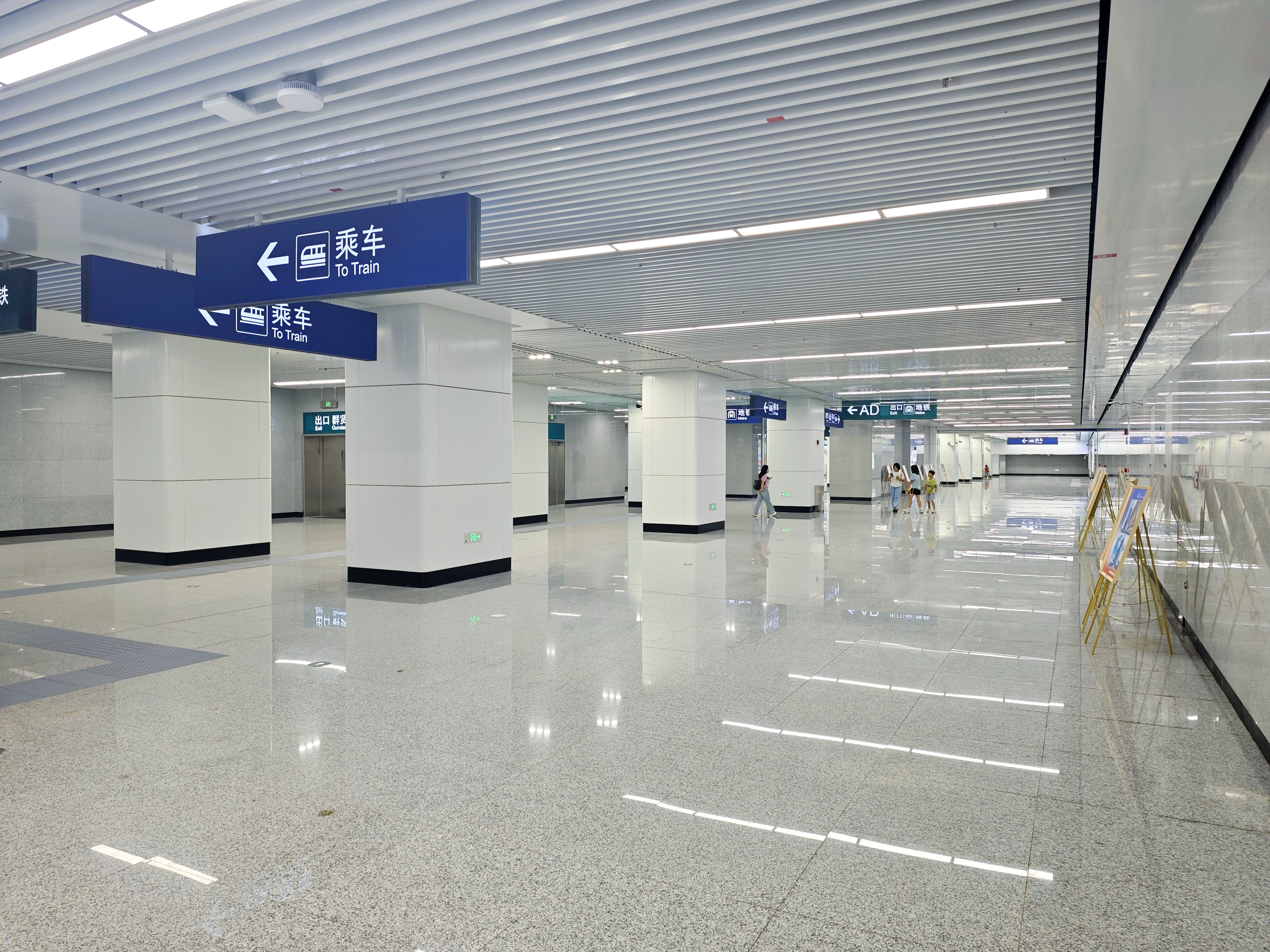
Transfer concourse

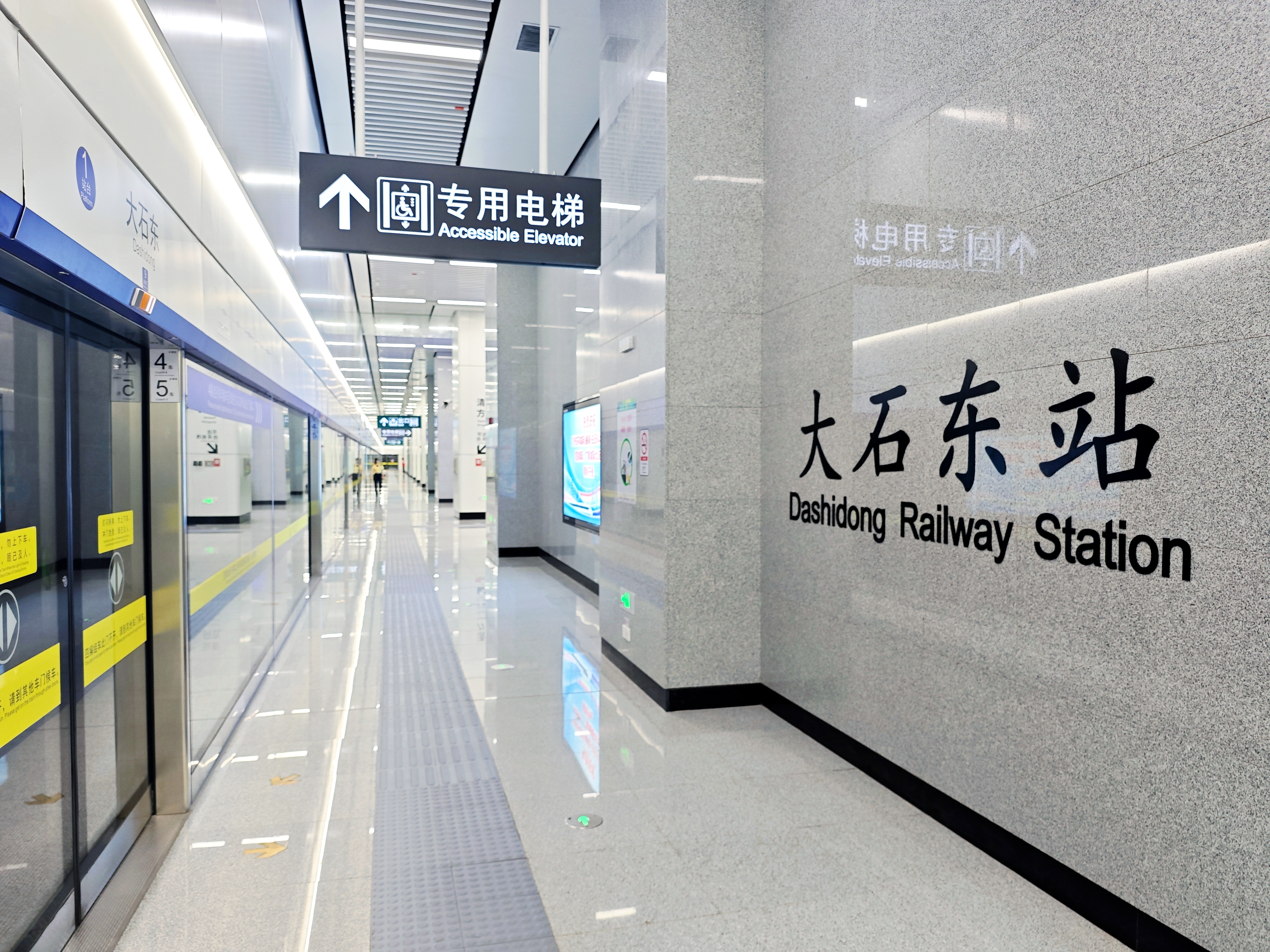
Platform 1

=== Entrances/exits ===
The station has 5 points of entry/exit, located on the north and south sides of Qunxian Road. In its initial opening, only Exits A and D were opened. At the same time, there is a passage connecting Dashi station of Guangzhou Metro Line 3 with the Dashan Commercial Building next to Exit A.

- A: Qunxian Road
- B: Qunxian Road
- C: Qunxian Road
- D: Qunxian Road
- ~~E~~: (not open)
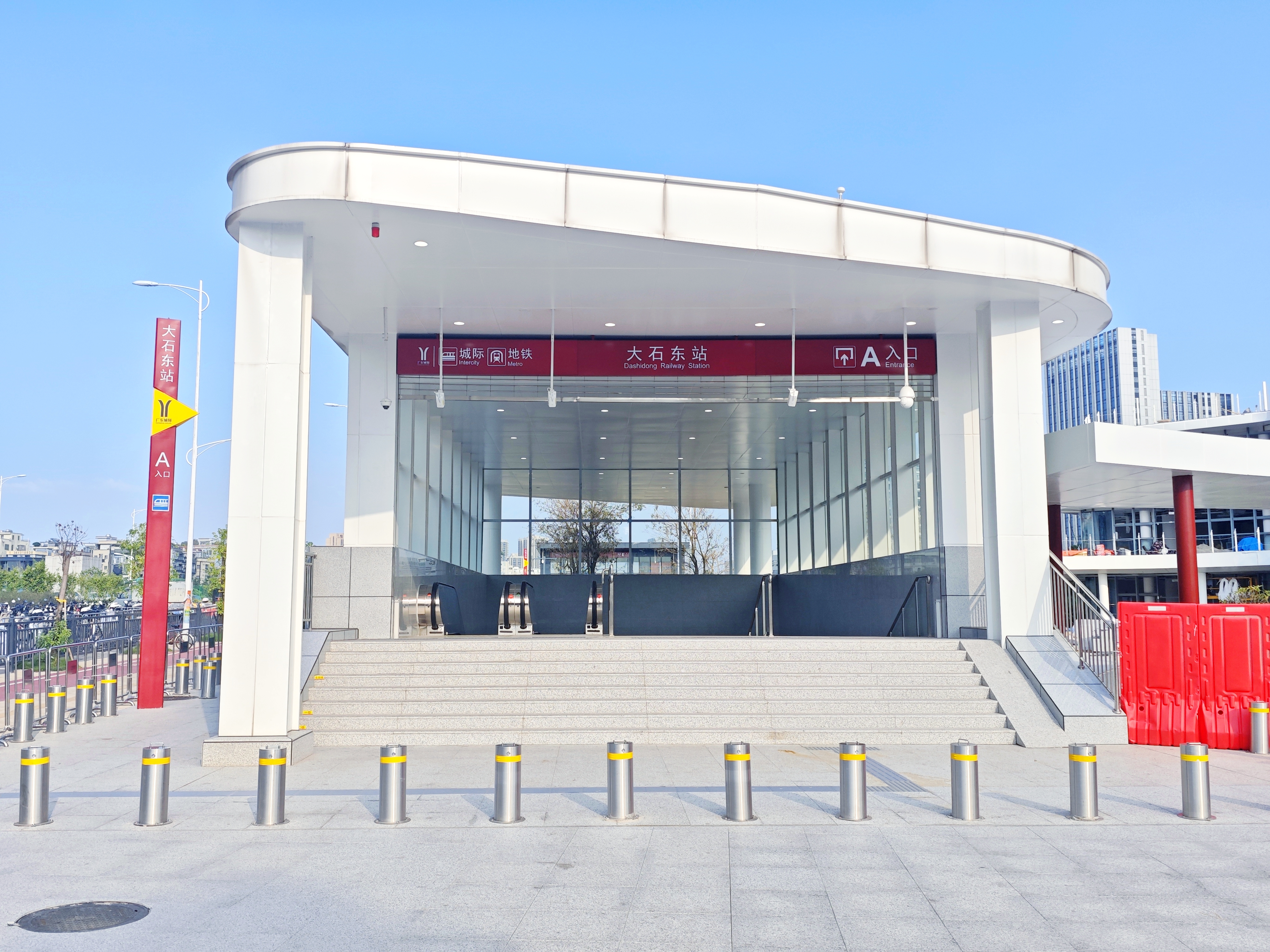
Entrance A

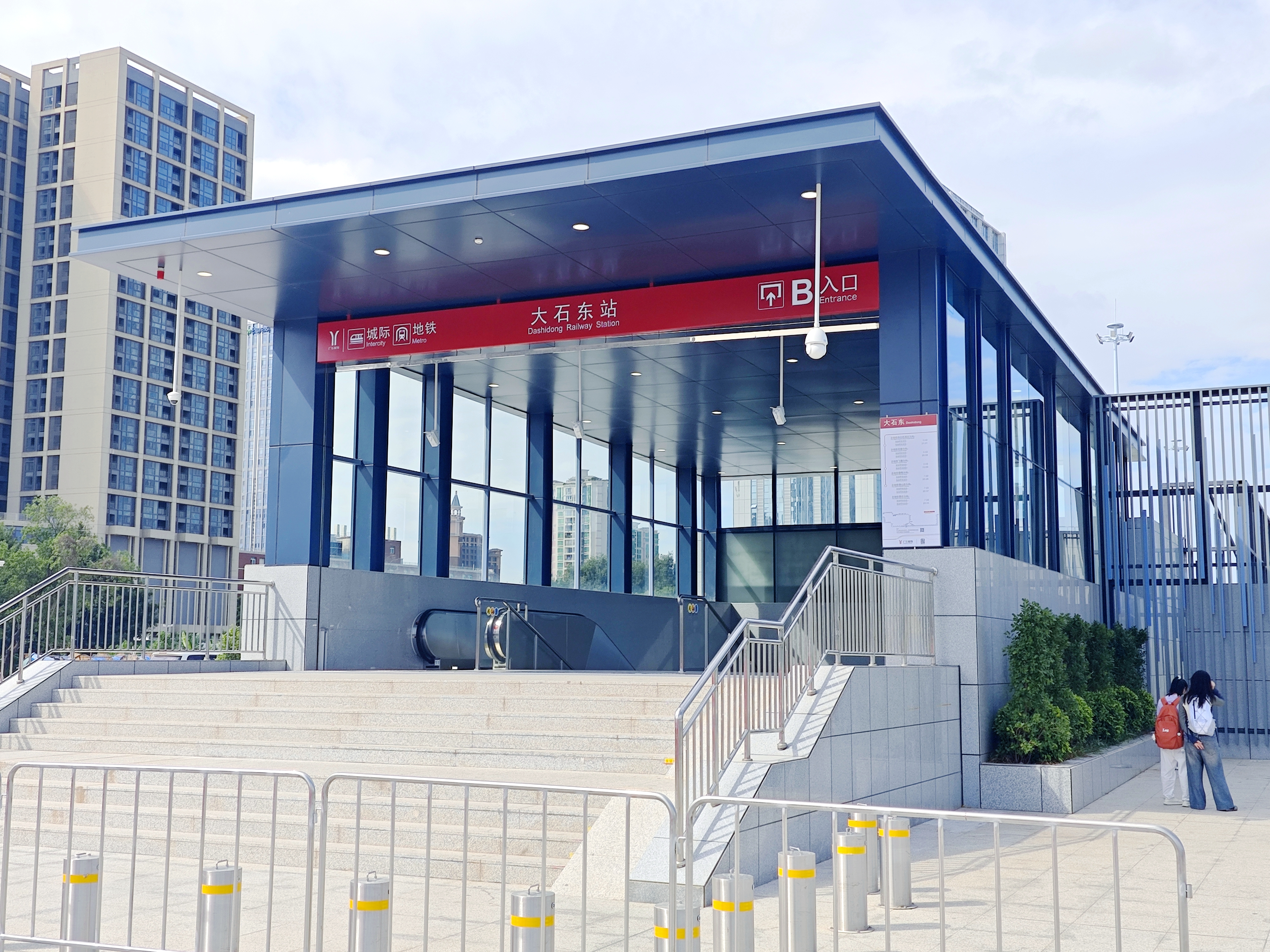
Entrance B

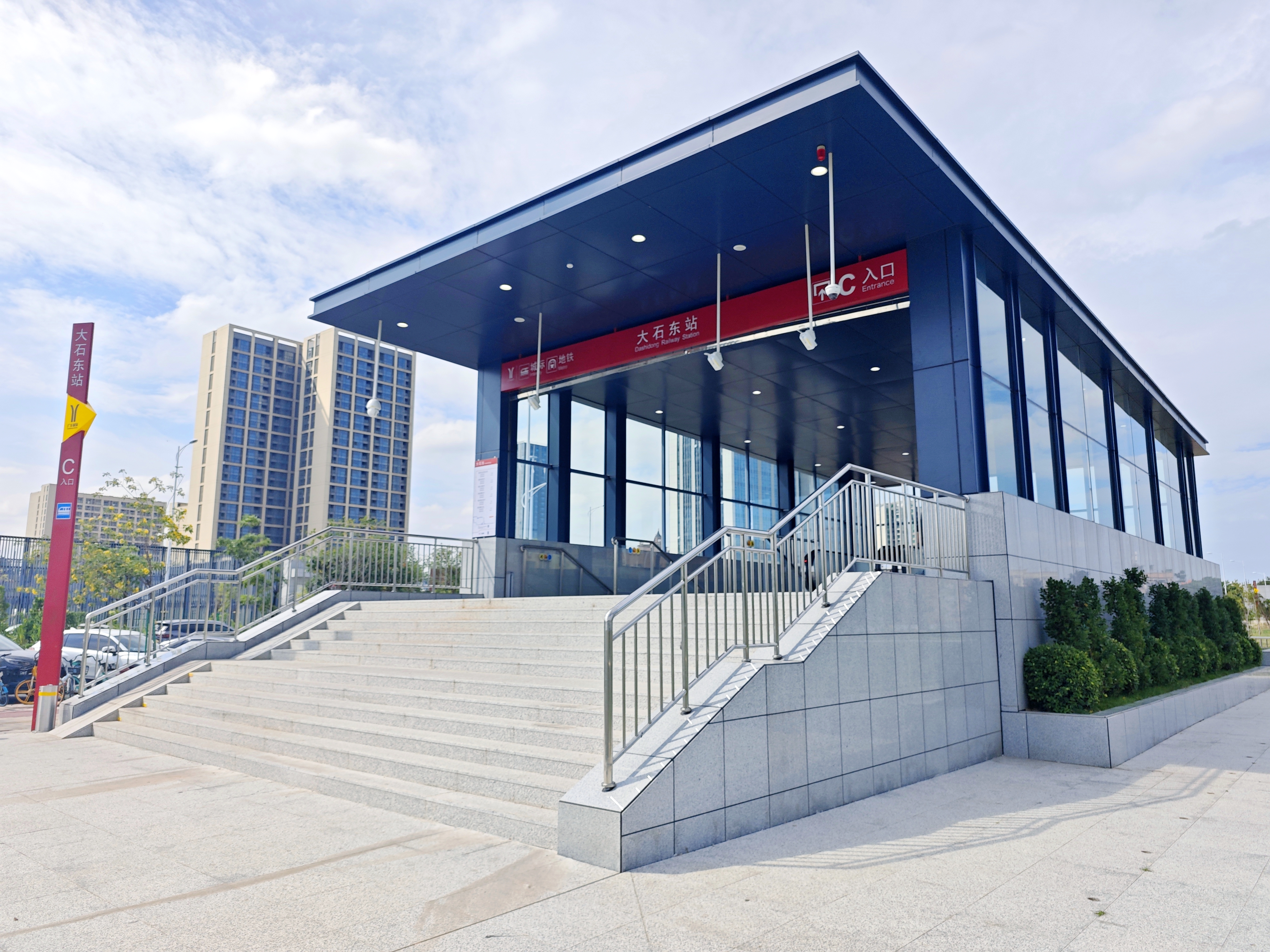
Entrance C

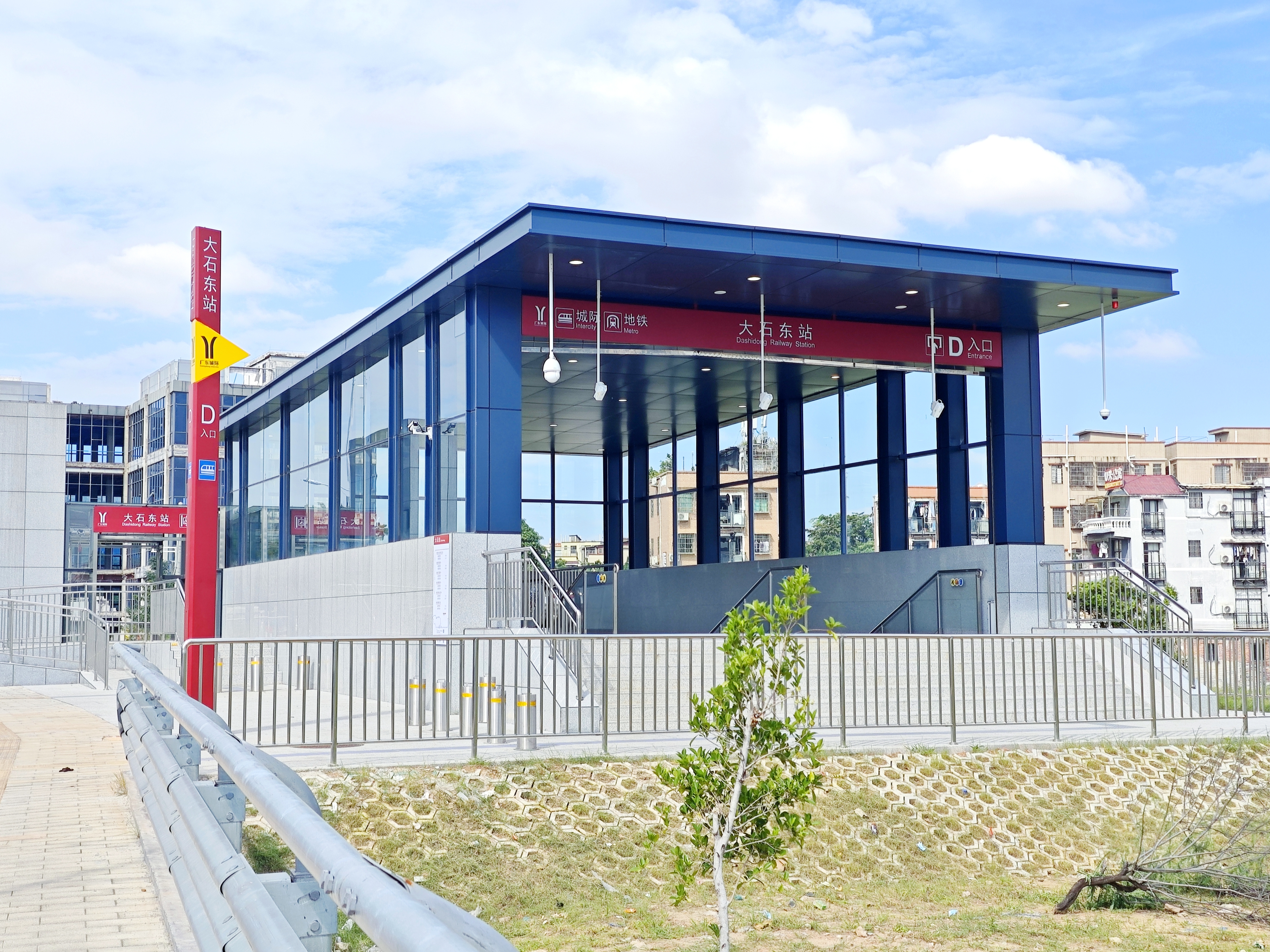
Entrance D

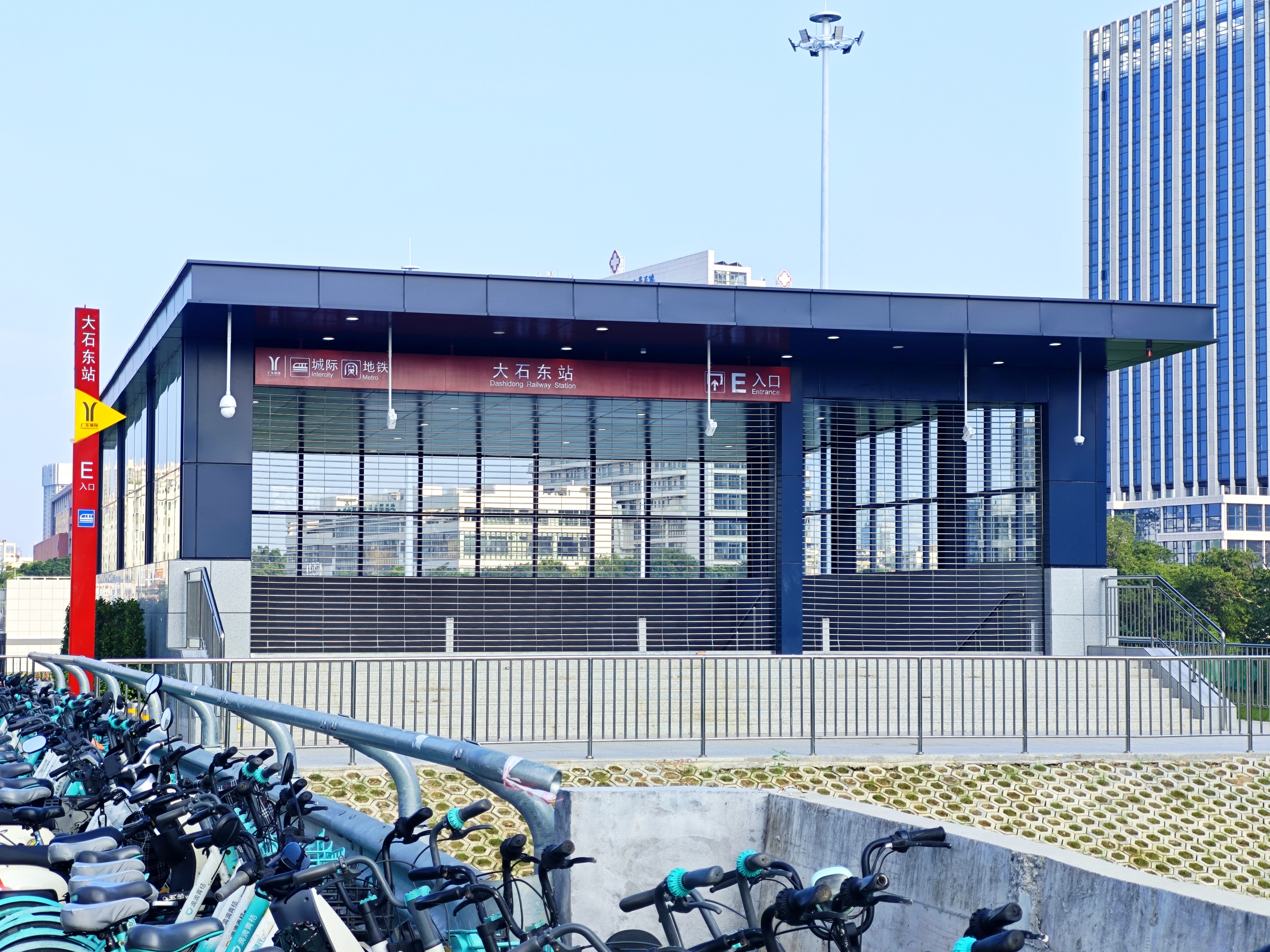
Entrance E

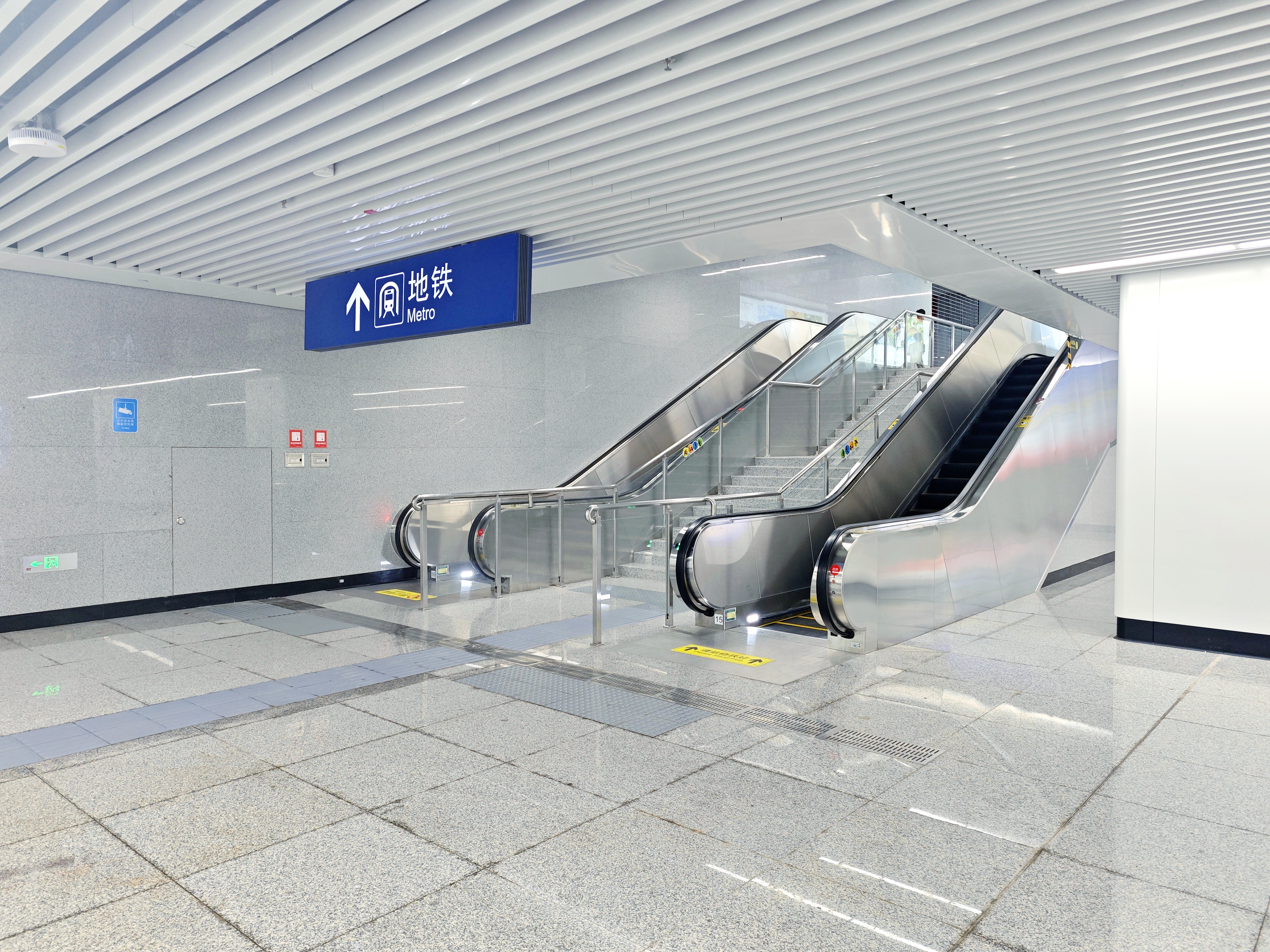
Transfer passage to metro station

== History ==
The station was called Dashi station during the planning and construction phase. Before opening, the station was renamed to Dashi East (Dashidong) station.

The main structure of the station topped out on 29 August 2020, making it the first topped out station on the East Ring section.

On 4 December 2021, the down-line shield tunnel crossed the section from Shaxi to Nancun Wanbo of Guangzhou Metro Line 18. On the 25th of the same month, the up-line shield tunnel broke through. On 30 June 2022, the down-line shield tunnel broke through, becoming the first section within the East Ring section to complete tunnelling. On 6 August 2023, the left line tunnel from this station to Panyu railway station broke through.

On 29 September 2025, the station opened.

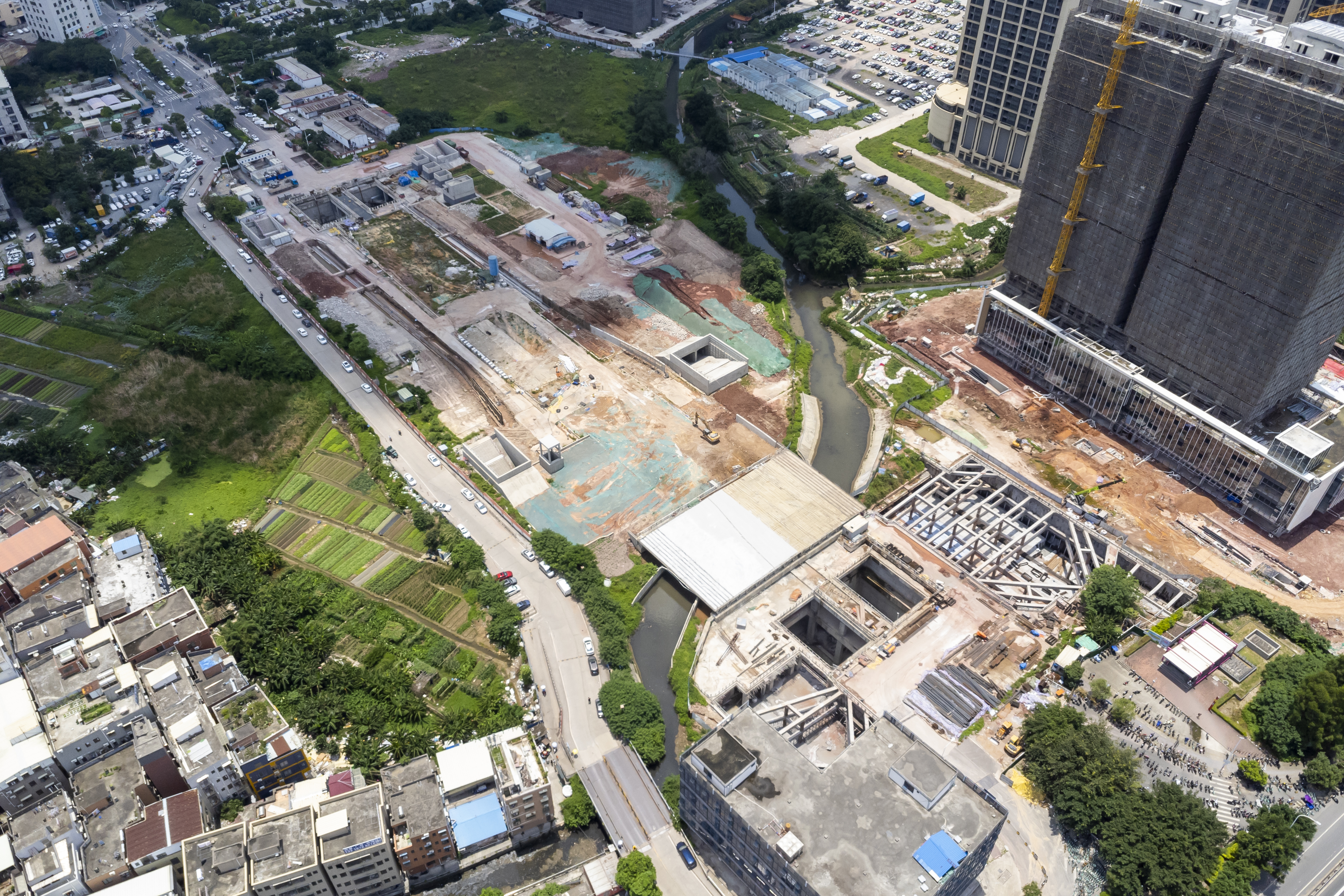
Construction site (May 2023)

== Transfer ==
On the southwest side of the station, passengers can connect to Dashi station on Line 3 via a transfer passage between the two lines.
