= ASPAC =

ASPAC may refer to:

- Asia Pacific Network of Science and Technology Centres
- ASPAC FC
