= Dashi station =

Guangzhou Metro station

Dashi 大石
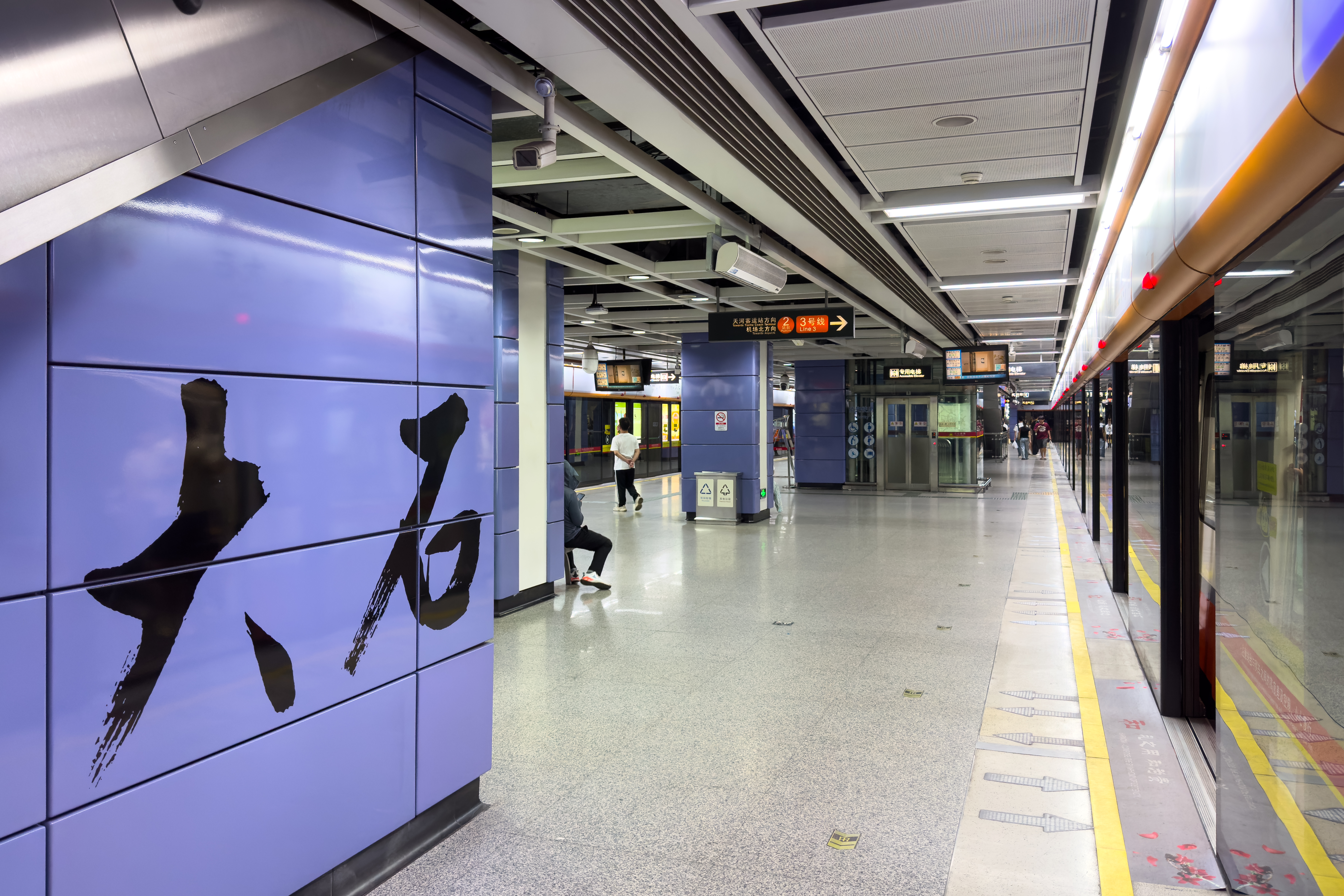
- Platform 2

Chinese name
- Chinese: 大石站
Transcriptions
Standard Mandarin
- Hanyu Pinyin: Dàshí Zhàn
Yue: Cantonese
- Yale Romanization: Daaihsehk Jaahm
- Jyutping: Daai^{6}sek^{6} Zaam^{6}
- Hong Kong Romanization: Tai Shek station

General information
- Location: Panyu District, Guangzhou, Guangdong; China
- Coordinates: 23°01′05″N 113°19′18″E
- Operated by: Guangzhou Metro Co. Ltd.
- Line: Line 3
- Platforms: 2 (1 island platform)
- Tracks: 2
- Connections: Dashi East

Construction
- Structure type: Underground
- Accessible: Yes

Other information
- Station code: 304

History
- Opened: 30 December 2006; 19 years ago

Services
Preceding station	Guangzhou Metro	Following station
Hanxi Changlong towards Haibang	Line 3	Xiajiao towards Airport North (Terminal 2) or Tianhe Coach Terminal
Transfer at Dashi East
Preceding station	Pearl River Delta Metropolitan Region Intercity Railway	Following station
Guangzhou Higher Education Mega Center towards Huadu	Guangzhou–Foshan circular intercity railway transfer at Dashi East	Panyu towards Foshan West
Location

Dashi Station (Chinese: 大石站; Cantonese Yale: Daaihsehk Jaahm; lit. 'Big Rock Station') is a station of Line 3 of the Guangzhou Metro that started operation on 28 December 2006. It is located under the New Moon Pearl Garden (新月明珠花园) in the Dashi Subdistrict, Panyu District, which is near where the Xinguang Expressway (新光快速公路) passes over Qunxian Road (群贤路). The station has reservations to interchange with Line 7. The northern end of the concourse has structures reserved for the two side platforms for Line 7. However, Line 7 was adjusted and changed to Hanxi Changlong station and the reserved structure of this station has been left unused and covered with enamel panels.

== Station layout ==
G	Street Level	Exit
L1; Concourse	Lobby	Customer Service, Shops, Vending machines, ATMs
L1; Concourse	-	Reserved zone (closed)
L2; Platforms	Platform 1	3 towards Haibang (Hanxi Changlong)
L2; Platforms	Island platform, doors will open on the left
L2; Platforms	Platform 2	3 towards Tianhe Coach Terminal or Airport North (Xiajiao)

== Exits ==
Exit number	Exit location
Exit A	Qunxian Lu
Exit B	Xinguang Expressway
Exit C	Xinguang Expressway
Exit D	Xinguang Expressway
