= Haixinsha Island (Haizhu District) =

Island in Guangzhou, China

Coordinates: 23.055°N 113.314°E

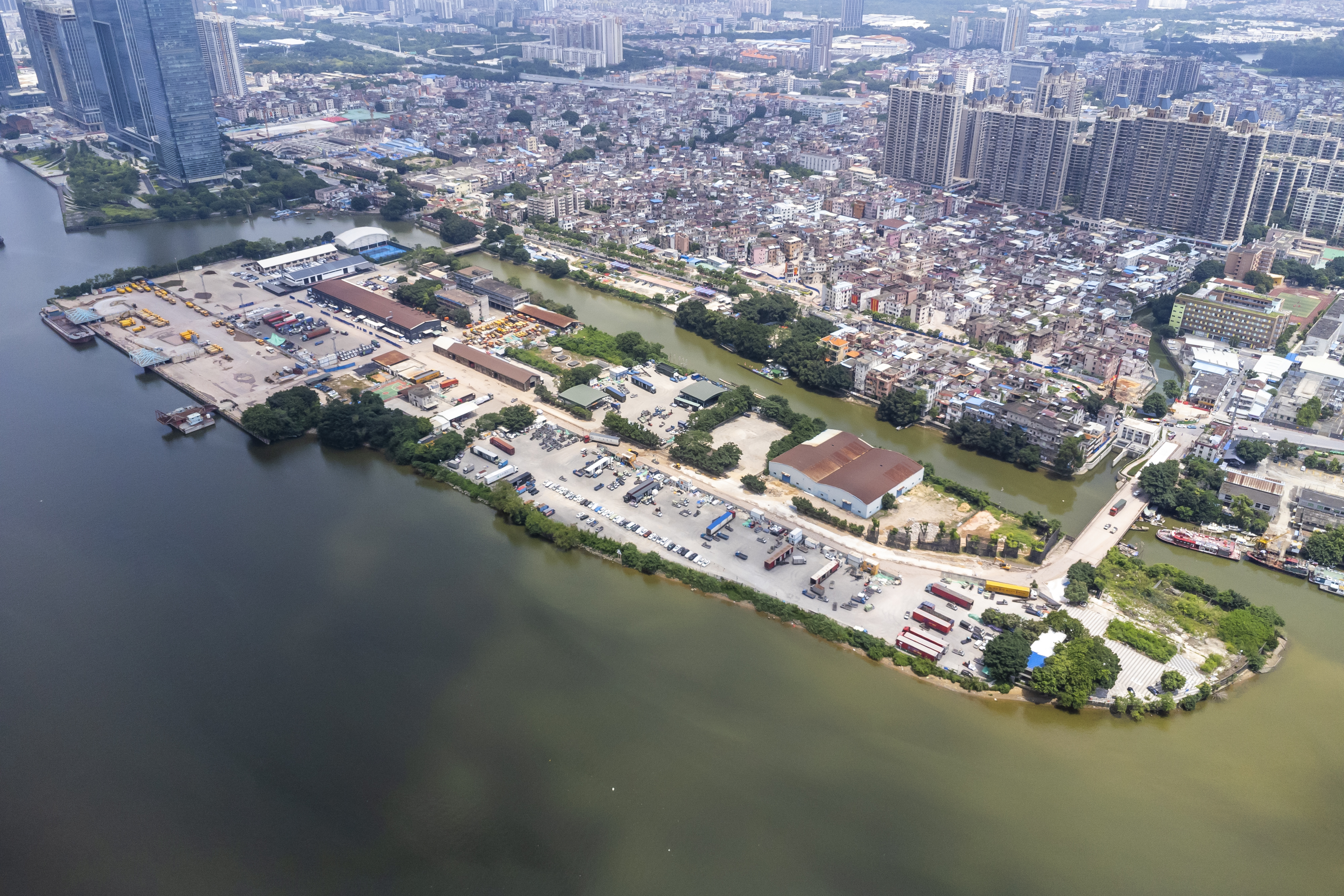
Aerial view

Haixinsha Island (Chinese: 海心沙) is an island in Haizhu District, Guangzhou, Guangdong, China. It is located between Luoxi Bridge (Chinese: 洛溪大桥) and Xinguang Bridge (Chinese: 新光大桥). It is at the south of Lijiao Station of Haizhu Island and the north of Luoxi Island of Panyu District.

== See also ==
- Haixinsha Island (Tianhe District): another island with the same name in Tianhe District, Guangzhou
