= List of ferries, wharfs and ports in Guangzhou =

Ports, wharfs, and ferries in Guangzhou include three ports, wharfs along the Pearl River in downtown Guangzhou, and ferries in Panyu and Nansha districts. Several ferry routes connect these districts with other parts of Guangzhou and with Foshan and Zhongshan.

== Ports in Guangzhou ==
- Guangzhou Port (formerly Guangzhou Port and Huangpu Port)
- Nansha Port
- Lianhuashan Port

== Wharfs in downtown Guangzhou along the Pearl River ==
- Jinshazhou Wharf
- Shiweitang Wharf
- Huangpu Military Academy Wharf
- Haixinsha Wharf
- Canton Tower Wharf
- Tianzi Wharf
- Fangcun Wharf
- Xidi Wharf
- Zhongda Wharf
- Xinzhou Wharf
- Shenjing Wharf
- Changzhou Wharf
- Yuzhu Dock
- Shabei Wharf
- Dayuanshuaifu Wharf (Generalissimo Sun Yat-Sen's Mansion Wharf)
- Fangzhi Wharf
- Qiankou Wharf
- Shengzong Wharf (Guangdong Federation of Trade Unions Wharf)
- Haizhuang Wharf
- Aozhou Wharf
- Baixianke Wharf
- Baihedong Wharf
- Guangzhong Wharf
- Lianhewei Wharf
- Shaxi Wharf
- Yongxingjie Wharf
- Tanwei Wharf
- Songxi Wharf
- Xicun Wharf
- Ruyifang Wharf
- Huangsha Wharf
- Taigucang Wharf (Pacific Wharf, closed)
- Liede Dock (demolished)

== Ferries in Panyu District and Nansha District ==
- Xinzao Ferry
- Suishi Ferry
- Nanting Ferry
- Daxing Ferry
- Dongxiang Ferry
- Xisan Ferry
- Xi'er Ferry (closed)
- Xiyi Ferry (to Haizhu District)
- Xiabei Ferry (to Liwan District)
- Weichong Ferry (to Shunde District, Foshan City)
- Shalu Ferry (to Huangpu District, closed)
- Beidou Ferry
- Basha Ferry (to Shunde District, Foshan City)
- Zhangsong Ferry (to Shunde District, Foshan City)
- Qianfeng Ferry
- Dongdao Ferry
- Shagongbao Ferry
- Shabei Ferry
- Guanlong Ferry
- Sansha Ferry
- Dawen Ferry
- Dongfeng Ferry
- Xili Ferry
- Xinsha Ferry
- Xinshayiyuan Ferry (Xinsha Hospital Ferry)
- Nan'er Ferry
- Miaoqing Ferry
- Miaobei Ferry
- Guishanongchang Ferry (Guisha Cattle Farm Ferry)
- Xinlian'ercun Ferry (to Nansha District)
- Fangma Ferry (named Dakui Ferry in Zhongshan) (to Zhongshan City)
