= Xiajiao station =

Guangzhou Metro station

Coordinates: 23.0379°N 113.3204°E

Xiajiao 厦滘
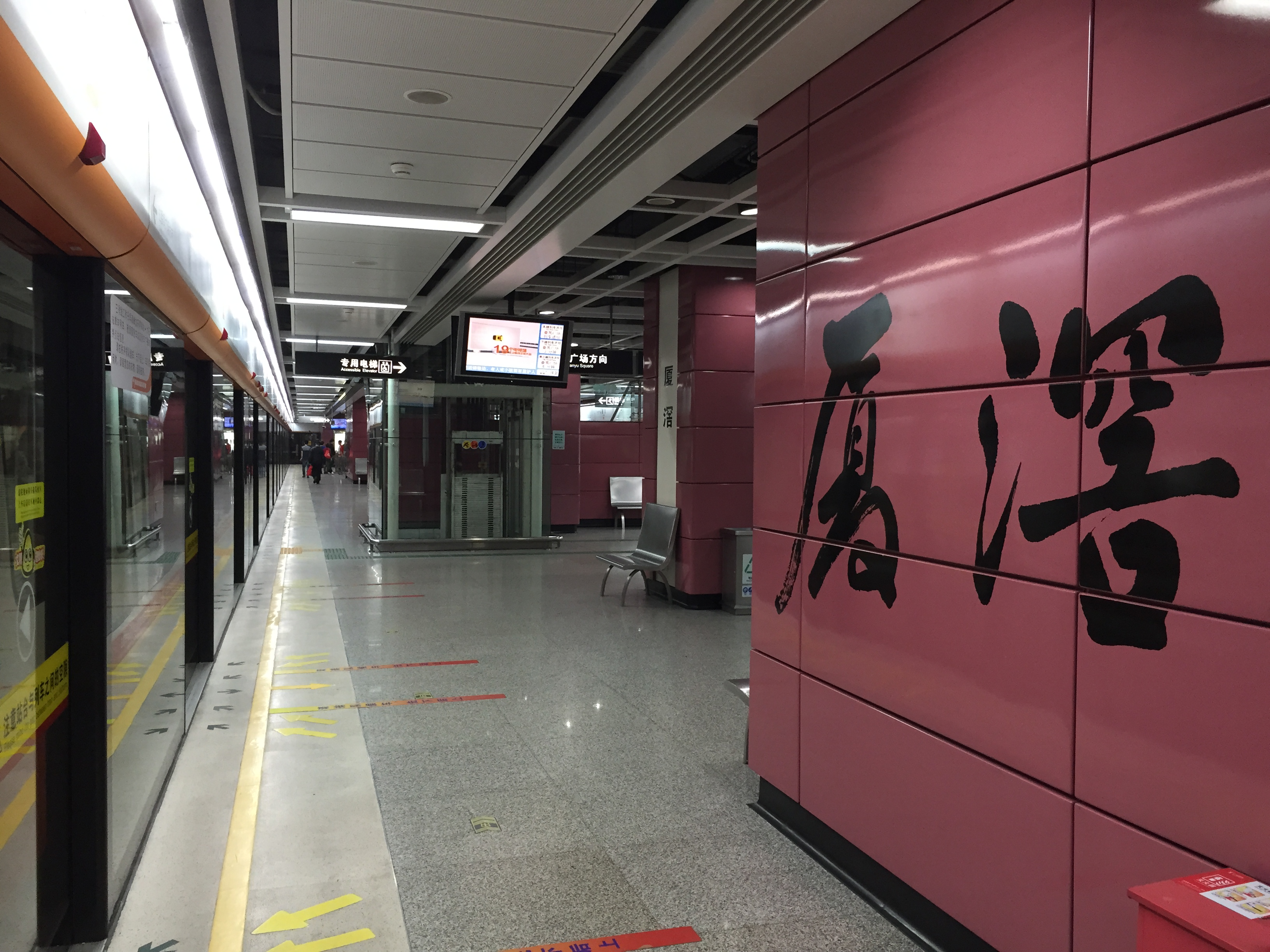

Chinese name
- Simplified Chinese: 厦滘站
- Traditional Chinese: 廈滘站
Transcriptions
Standard Mandarin
- Hanyu Pinyin: Xiàjiào Zhàn
Yue: Cantonese
- Yale Romanization: Hahgaau Jaahm
- Jyutping: Haa^{6}gaau^{3} Zaam^{6}
- Hong Kong Romanization: Ha Kau station

General information
- Location: Panyu District, Guangzhou, Guangdong; China
- Operated by: Guangzhou Metro Co. Ltd.
- Line: Line 3
- Platforms: 2 (1 island platform)

Construction
- Structure type: Underground

Other information
- Station code: 305

History
- Opened: 30 December 2006; 19 years ago

Services
Preceding station	Guangzhou Metro	Following station
Dashi towards Haibang	Line 3	Lijiao towards Airport North (Terminal 2) or Tianhe Coach Terminal
Location

Xiajiao Station (simplified Chinese: 厦滘站; traditional Chinese: 廈滘站; Cantonese Yale: Hahgaau Jaahm) is a station on Line 3 of the Guangzhou Metro that started operations on 28 December 2006. It is located under Xiajiao Village (厦滘村) in Luoxi Island, Panyu District of Guangzhou. It is near Wuzhou Decoration Center, Shaxi Plastic Center, the White Palace Hotel and the White Palace Theater.

== Station layout ==
G	Street level	Exit
L1; Concourse	Lobby	Customer Service, Shops, Vending machines, ATMs
L2; Platforms	Platform 1	3 towards Haibang (Dashi)
L2; Platforms	Island platform, doors will open on the left
L2; Platforms	Platform 2	3 towards Tianhe Coach Terminal or Airport North (Lijiao)

== Exits ==
Exit number	Exit location
Exit A	Xiajiao Nanlu
Exit B	Yingbin Lu
