= Tianzi Wharf =

Ferry pier in Guangzhou, China

Coordinates: 23°7′2.75″N 113°15′57.25″E

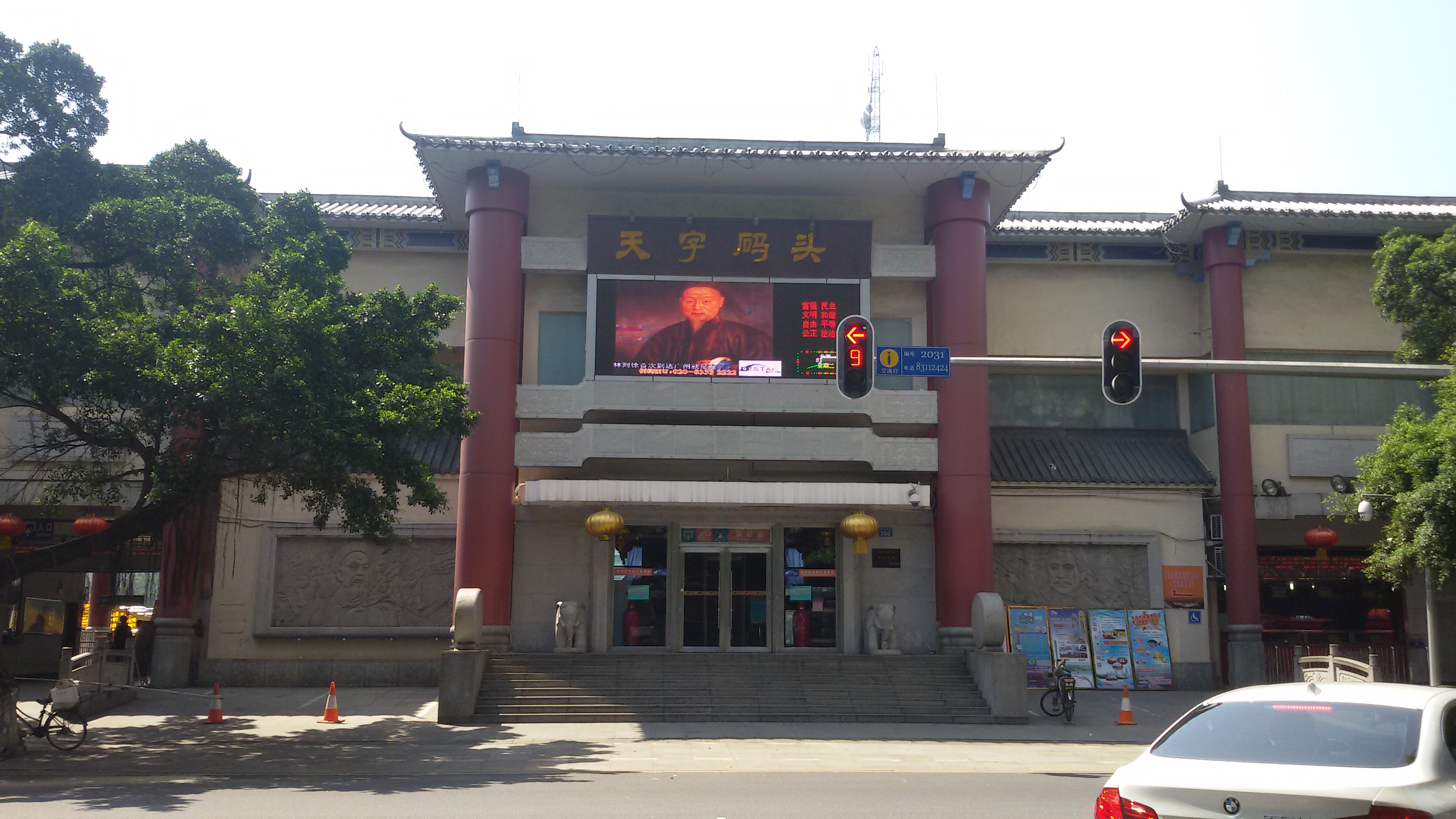
Tianzi Wharf

Tianzi Wharf (traditionally Gov. Wharf, Jyutping: Tin1 zi6 maa5 tau4), also known as 'The First Wharf of Canton', is the oldest wharf on the Pearl River in Guangzhou, China. The wharf is at the intersection of Beijing Road and Yanjiang Road Middle. It's currently a wharf of the Guangzhou Water Bus, and serves the ferries between Fangzhi Wharf and several water bus routes. It's also a terminal wharf of Pearl River Night Cruise.

== History ==
During the years of Qing Emperor Yongzheng (1723-1735), Tianzi Wharf was reserved for the use of officials. A kiosk in an alley on Beijing Road marks the location where Qing officials were greeted. In 1839, Lin Zexu used the wharf as a primary location for the destruction of British Opium. In addition, Sun Yat-sen took a ferry from this port during his escape to Hong Kong.

| Preceding station | Guangzhou Water Bus | Following station |
|---|---|---|
| West Bund towards Fangcun | Route S2 | Dayuanshuai Fu towards Canton Tower |
| Terminus | Route S7 | Fangzhi Terminus |
