= Guangzhou Higher Education Mega Center railway station =

Guangdong Intercity railway station in Guangzhou, China

Guangzhoudaxuecheng 广州大学城
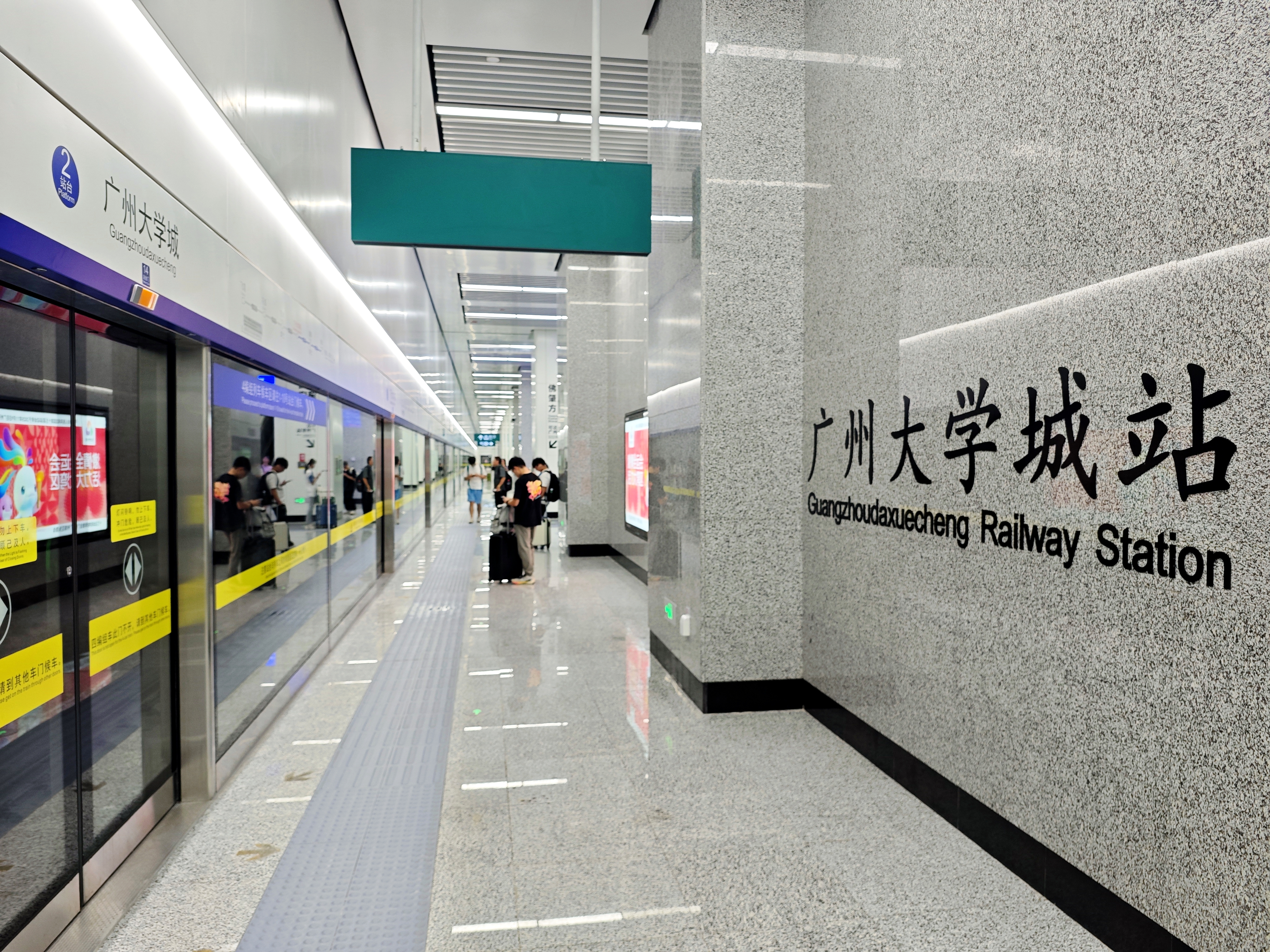
- Platform 2

Chinese name
- Simplified Chinese: 广州大学城站
- Traditional Chinese: 廣州大學城站
Transcriptions
Standard Mandarin
- Hanyu Pinyin: Guǎngzhōu Dàxuéchéng Zhàn
Yue: Cantonese
- Yale Romanization: Gwóngjāu Daaihhohksìhng Jaahm
- Jyutping: Gwong^{2}zau^{1} Daai^{6}hok^{6}sing^{4} Zaam^{6}

General information
- Location: Higher Education Mega Center Outer Circular West Road, next to Guangdong Science Center; Xiaoguwei Subdistrict, Panyu District, Guangzhou, Guangdong; China
- Coordinates: 23°2′28.36″N 113°21′29.95″E
- Owner: Pearl River Delta Metropolitan Region intercity railway
- Operator: Guangdong Intercity
- Line: Guangzhou East Ring intercity railway
- Platforms: 2 (1 island platform)
- Tracks: 4

Construction
- Structure type: Underground
- Accessible: Yes

Other information
- Station code: GCQ (Pinyin: GZC)

History
- Opened: 29 September 2025 (10 months ago)

Services
Preceding station	Pearl River Delta Metropolitan Region Intercity Railway	Following station
Pazhou towards Huadu	Guangzhou East Ring intercity railway	Dashi East towards Panyu
Location

Guangzhou Higher Education Mega Center railway station (Chinese: 广州大学城站; pinyin: Guǎngzhōu Dàxuéchéng Zhàn; Cantonese Yale: Gwóngjāu Daaihhohksìhng Jaahm) is an underground railway station on Guangzhou East Ring intercity railway located in Panyu District, Guangzhou, Guangdong, China. It opened on 29 September 2025. The station is located next to the Guangdong Science Center and Guangzhou University Higher Education Mega Center Campus.

== Features ==
The station has an underground island platform. It also has 2 wind shafts, a cooling tower, an emergency exit and 2 sunken squares.

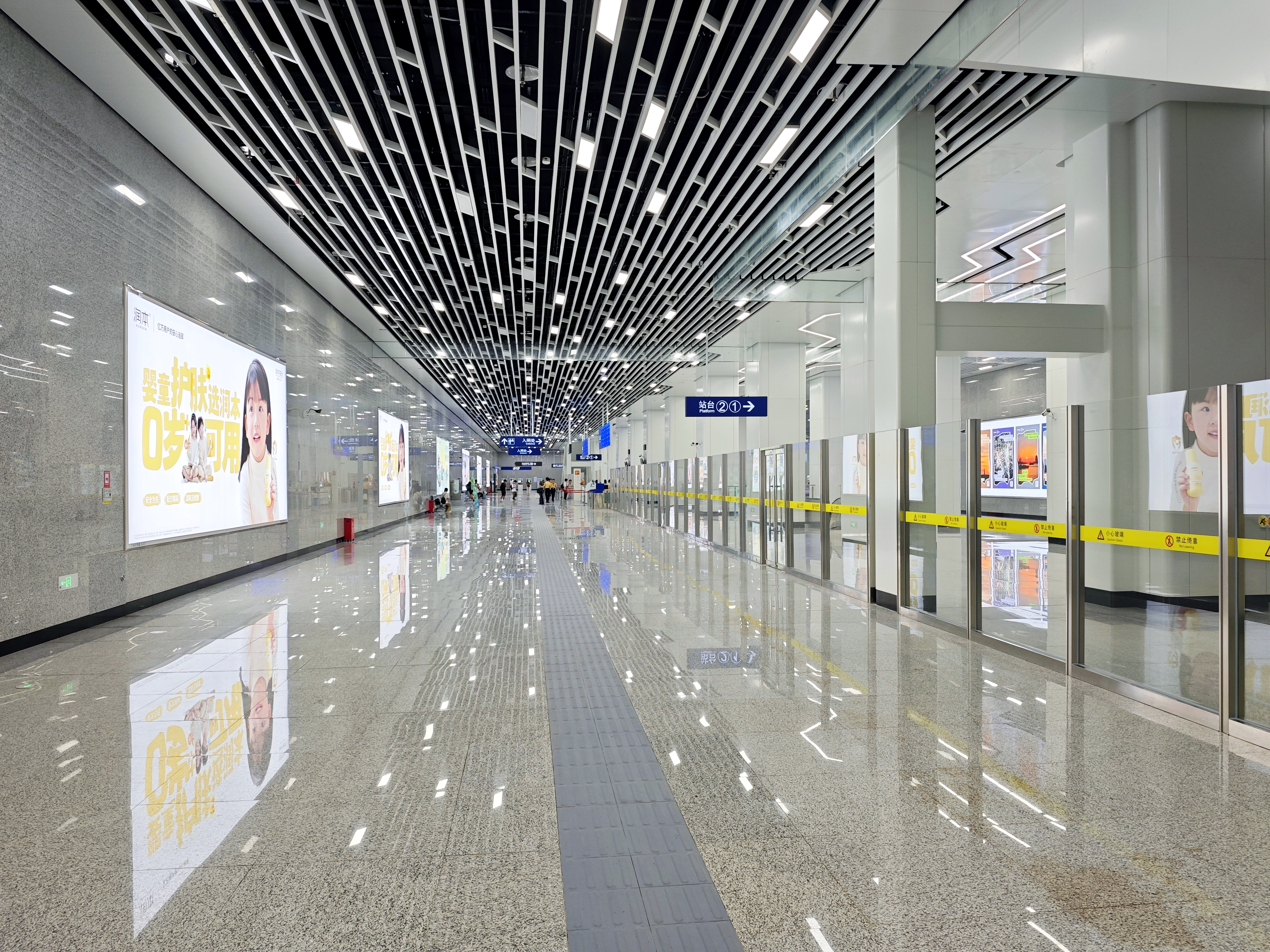
Concourse

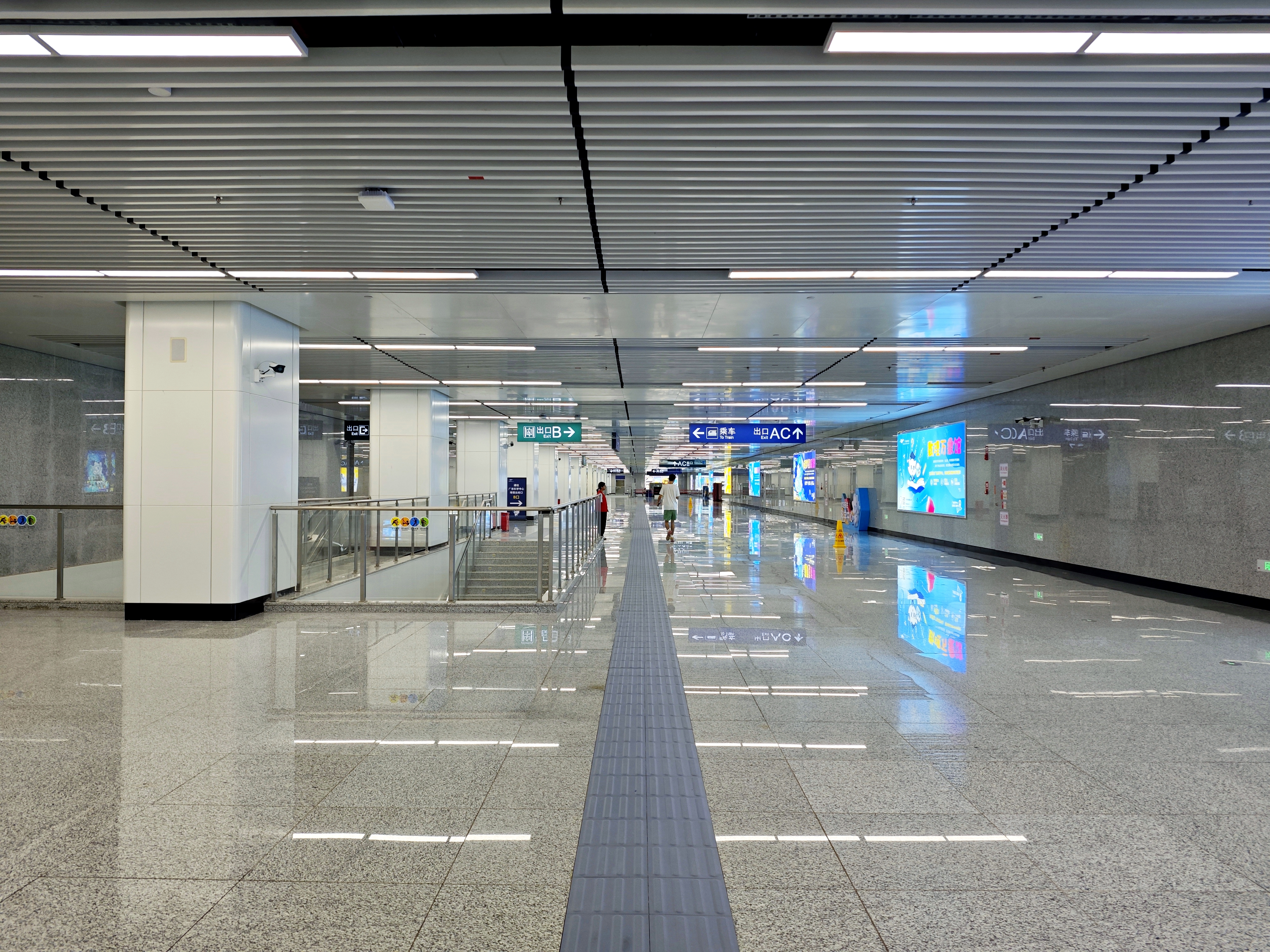
Transfer level

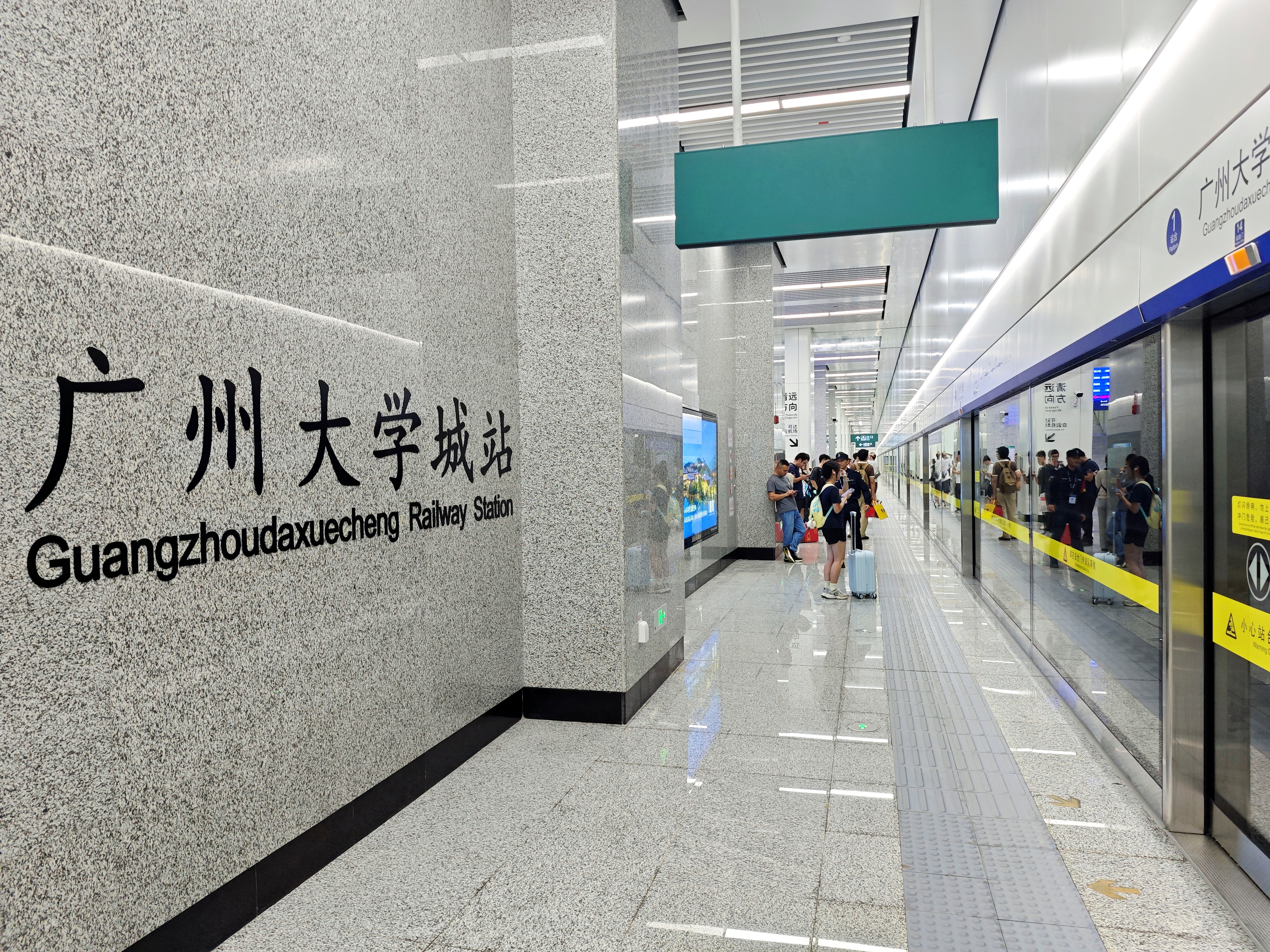
Platform 1

=== Entrances/exits ===
The station has 3 points of entry/exit. In its initial opening, only Exit B was opened. Exits A and B are located in the sunken square next to the Guangdong Science Center, Exit C is located separately on the south side of the Guangdong Science Center.

- ~~A~~: (Not open)
- B: Higher Education Mega Center Outer Circular West Road, Guangdong Science Center, Guangzhou University Higher Education Mega Center Campus
- ~~C~~: (Not open)
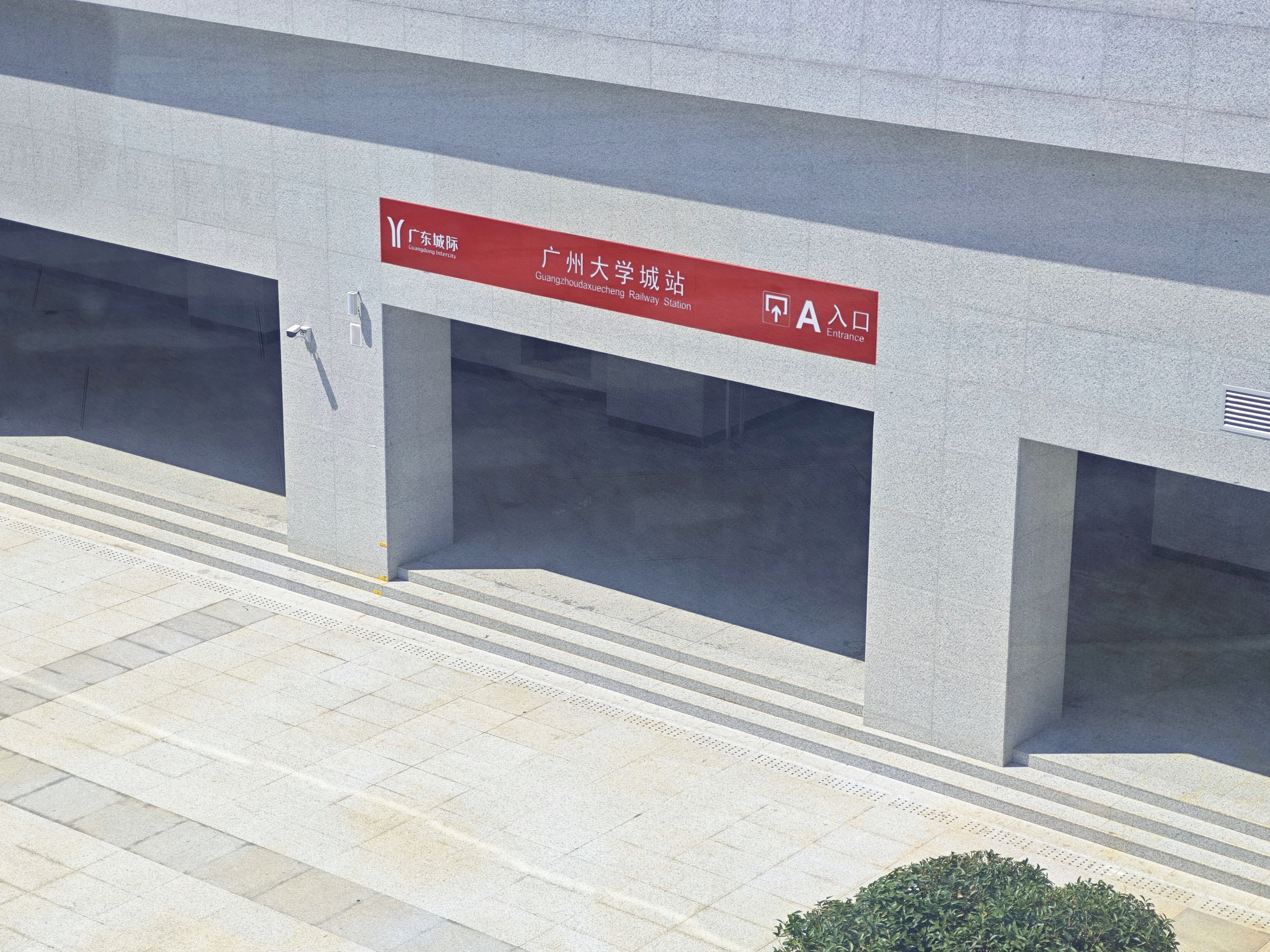
Entrance A

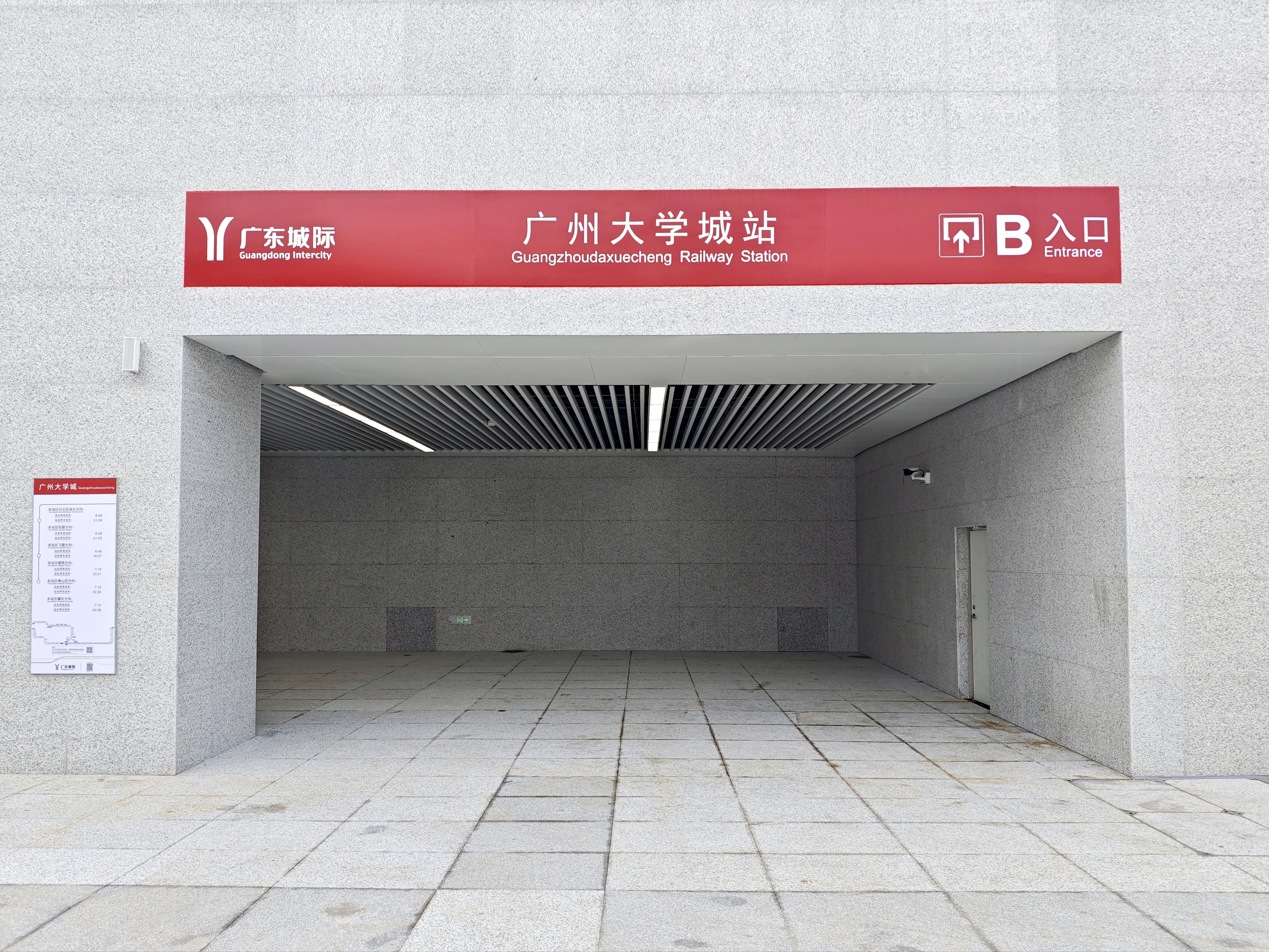
Entrance B

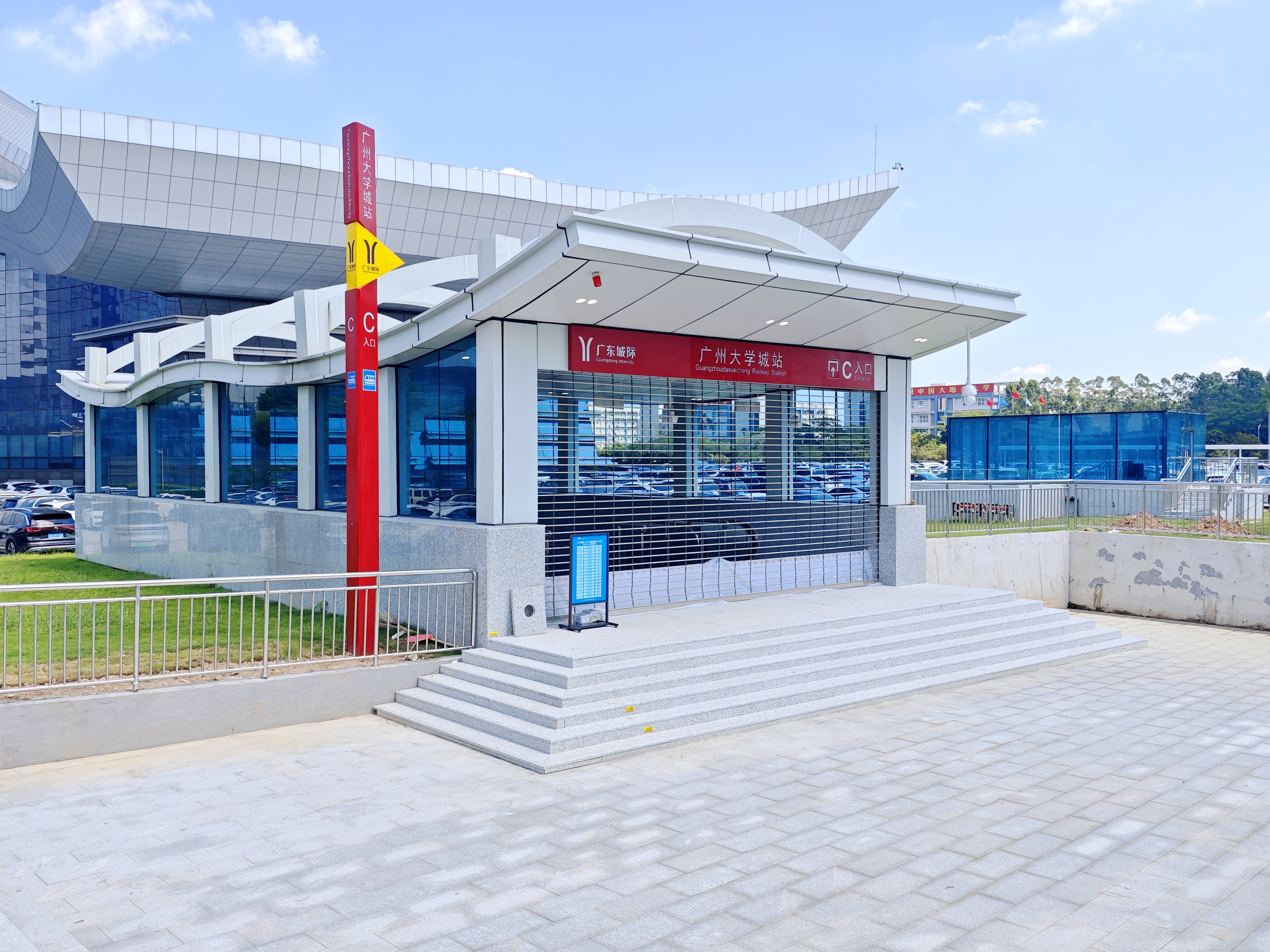
Entrance C

== Near the station ==
- Guangdong Science Center
- Guangzhou Higher Education Mega Center

== History ==
The original plan of the Guangzhou–Foshan circular intercity railway was to set up a station in Lijiao and did not pass through the Guangdong Science Center. However, in September 2015, the line was adjusted to avoid the Haizhu Wetland Park, choosing to pass through the Higher Education Mega Center and set up a station next to Guangdong Science Center. This not only reduced the difficulty of project implementation but also made up for the long-term transportation inconvenience of the science center. The original plan of the station passed through the site of the forthcoming Seismic Control and Structural Safety Laboratory Building of Guangzhou University. During the public consultation stage, the university raised objections. After coordination, the route was adjusted to bypass Guangzhou University and relocate the nearby entrance and exit away from the campus side.

The station began construction in July 2017, and the main structure topped out on 2 July 2021. In January 2024, construction of the science plaza on the surface level of the station began.

The station was called Science Center station during the planning and construction phase. Before opening, the station was renamed to Guangzhou Higher Education Mega Center (Guangzhoudaxuecheng) station.

On 29 September 2025, the station opened.

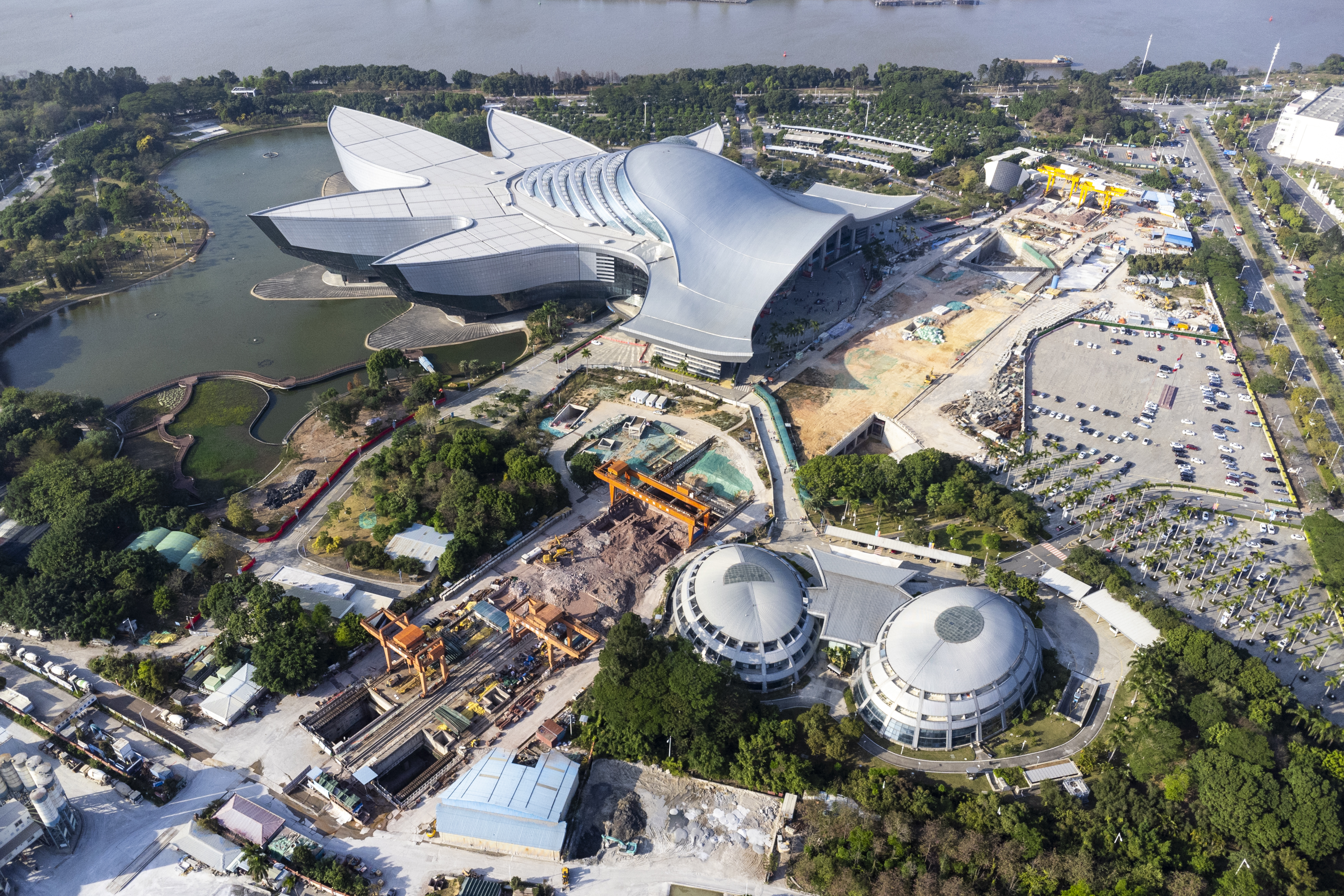
Construction site (January 2023)
