= Nanpu Island =

Island in Panyu, Guangdong, China

Coordinates: 23.03519°N 113.278313°E

Nanpu Island (Chinese: 南浦岛) is an island in Luopu Subdistrict (Chinese: 洛浦街道), Panyu, Guangzhou, Guangdong, China. It is located at the south of Luoxi Island (Chinese: 洛溪岛), the east of Chencun, Shunde, and the west and north of Dashi Town Centre. Its total area is about 10.7 square kilometres. Many fashionable residential estates, including Guangzhou Country Garden, are built in there. The island connects with Luoxi Island by Nanpu Bridge (Chinese: 南浦大桥) and Lijiang Bridge (Chinese: 丽江大桥) and Dashi Town Centre by Nanpu Dadao (Chinese: 南浦大道).
