= Luoxi Island =

Island in Guangzhou, China

Coordinates: 23°03′N 113°23′E

Luoxi Island (Chinese: 洛溪岛) is an island in Luopu Subdistrict (洛浦街道), Panyu District, Guangzhou City, Guangdong Province, China. It is located in the northeast of Nanpu Island to the south of Haizhu Island and to the west of Xiaoguwei Island. It is about 9.85 square kilometres (3.80 sq mi) in area and connects to the Guangzhou urban area via the Luoxi Bridge (洛溪大桥), Xinguang Bridge (新光大桥) and Panyu Bridge (番禺大桥).

Luoxi Bridge was the first toll road built in China, when Hong Kong tycoon Henry Fok invested into this bridge in his native Guangdong Province.
