= Haixinsha Island (Tianhe District) =

Island in China

Coordinates: 23°6′50″N 113°19′11″E

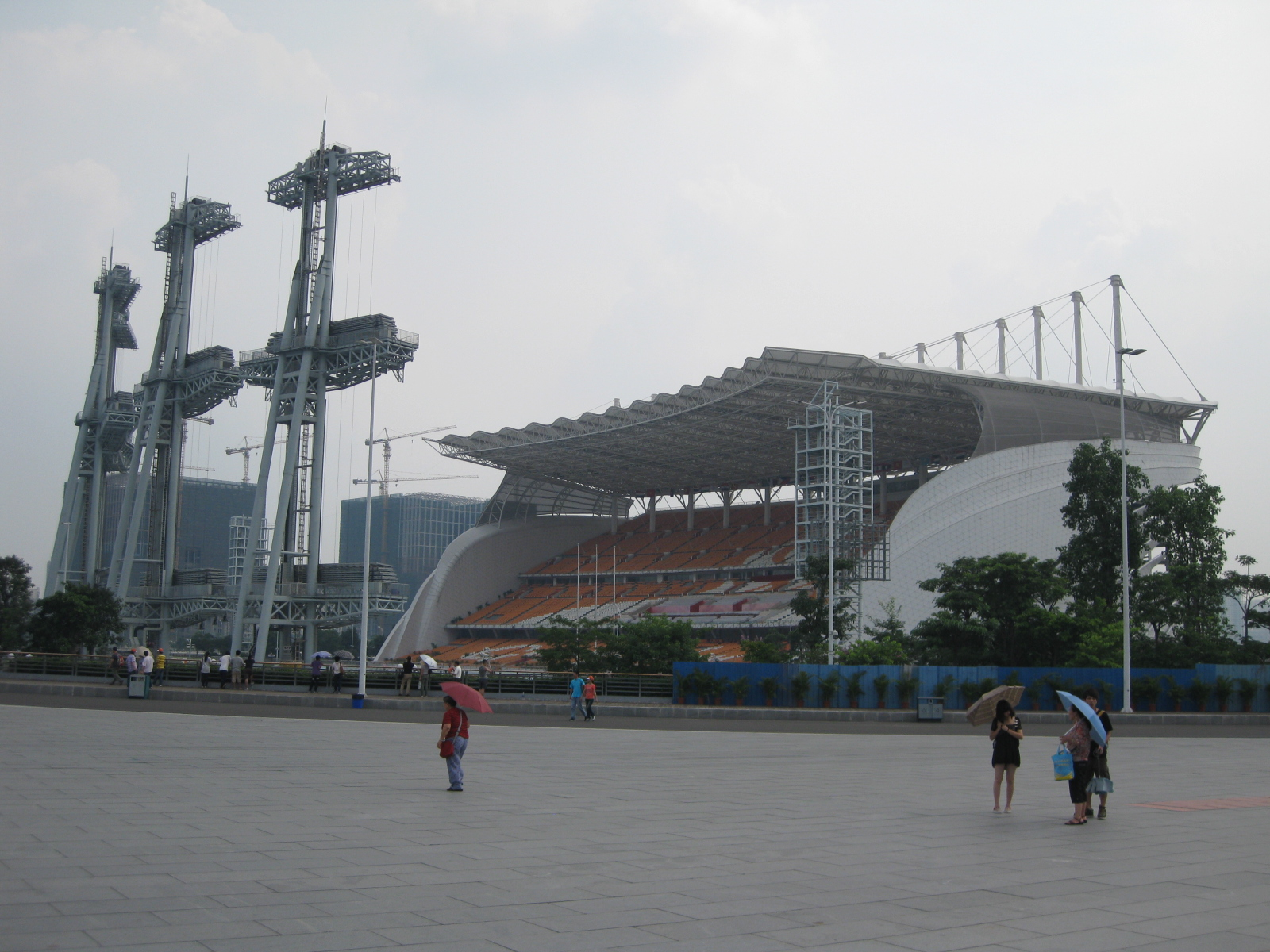
- Haixinsha Square
- Interactive map of Haixinsha Island (Tianhe District)
- Location: Tianhe District, Guangzhou, Guangdong, China
- Capacity: 35,000
- Surface: Steel

Construction
- Opened: 2010

Haixinsha Island (Chinese: 海心沙) is an island in Tianhe District, Guangzhou, Guangdong, China. It is located to the south of Zhujiang New Town, newly developed CBD of the city, to the north of Canton Tower and to the east of Ersha Island.

The island had been used as garrison and warehouses of the People's Liberation Army until the local government decided it was to be redeveloped and used as the venue of the opening and closing ceremonies of the 2010 Asian Games. The island also sat at a strategic point of the new city centre, bordered by the new CBD on the north and the Pearl River on the south. Besides allocating a piece of land to the military, local government reportedly compensated another ¥1 billion in order to acquire land of the island. A viewing stand which seated 35,000 in three tiers of seating, was erected on western end in November 2010 for the opening ceremony. Other infrastructures include an apm station and a large underground complex linked directly to the CBD.

The future of the island is a subject of heated debate at the moment. When construction first started, the government claimed the area would serve as a civic square after the Asian Games. However, immediately after the games was finished, the whole island was turned into an Asian Games park, which charged an entry fee. Although the park attracted mainly tourists, the entry fee affected people who used the metro station as all entrances and exits of the station were located within the park. This sparked a public outcry and the entry fee was eventually lifted in September 2012. Moreover, the viewing stand was supposed to be a temporary structure which should ultimately be demolished. But in 2012, it was reported that a local real estate company was planning to turn it into a luxury hotel with a rooftop swimming pool.

== Transport ==
- Haixinsha station, a station on APM line of Guangzhou Metro.

== See also ==
- Haixinsha Island (Haizhu District): another island with the same name in Haizhu District, Guangzhou

Preceded by Khalifa International Stadium; Doha	Asian Games; Opening and Closing Ceremonies; 2010	Succeeded by Incheon Asiad Main Stadium; Incheon
