= Asia Pacific Network of Science and Technology Centres =

Network organization of science centres and museums in Asia-Pacific

Asia Pacific Network of Science & Technology Centres
- Founded: 1997; 29 years ago
- Type: Non-profit
- Purpose: Science Centres & Museums
- Coordinates: 35.298000°S 149.131000°E
- Region served: Asia-Pacific
- Key people: Maria Isabel Garcia (Executive Director), LIM Tit Meng (Interim President), Graham Durant (Interim Vice-President)
- Website: ASPAC

The Asia Pacific Network of Science & Technology Centres (ASPAC) is a not-for-profit association initiated in 1997.

It was formed to facilitate communication and cooperation among Science Centres and Museums and other organisations that use interactive approaches for learning and public understanding of science and technology in the Asia-Pacific region. The network hosts annual conferences where members exchange the latest updates on science exhibitions, educational advancements, and upcoming events.

ASPAC has over 50 members from 20 countries (2022). Members include different forms of organisations, like science centres, science museums, children's museums, exhibit design and fabrication firms.

== See also ==
- List of science centers
