= Trust-Mart =

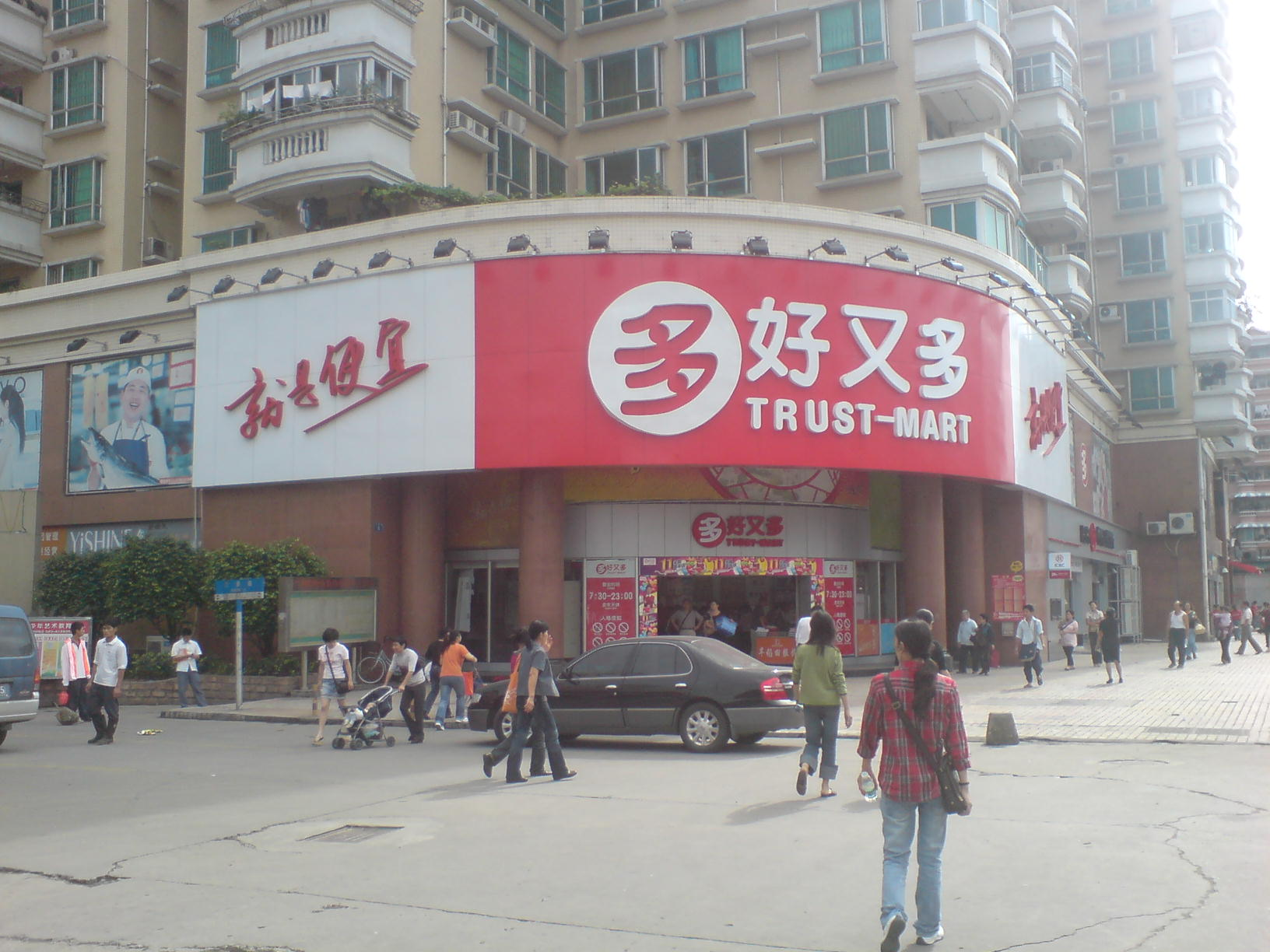
A Trust-Mart shop located in Guangzhou, China

Trust-Mart (Chinese: 好又多; pinyin: hǎoyòuduō) is a Taiwanese-owned chain of Chinese retail supercenters. The corporation was founded in 1997 by investors based in Taiwan and as of March, 2006, had in excess of 100 stores in 20 provinces of mainland China.

In October 2006, it was announced that Wal-Mart had won a bid to acquire 100 Chinese Trust-Mart centers for roughly one billion USD.

By February 2007 Walmart had completed the purchase of 35% of Bounteous Co Ltd, the operator of Trust-Mart.
