= Line 3 (Guangzhou Metro) =

Line of the Guangzhou Metro

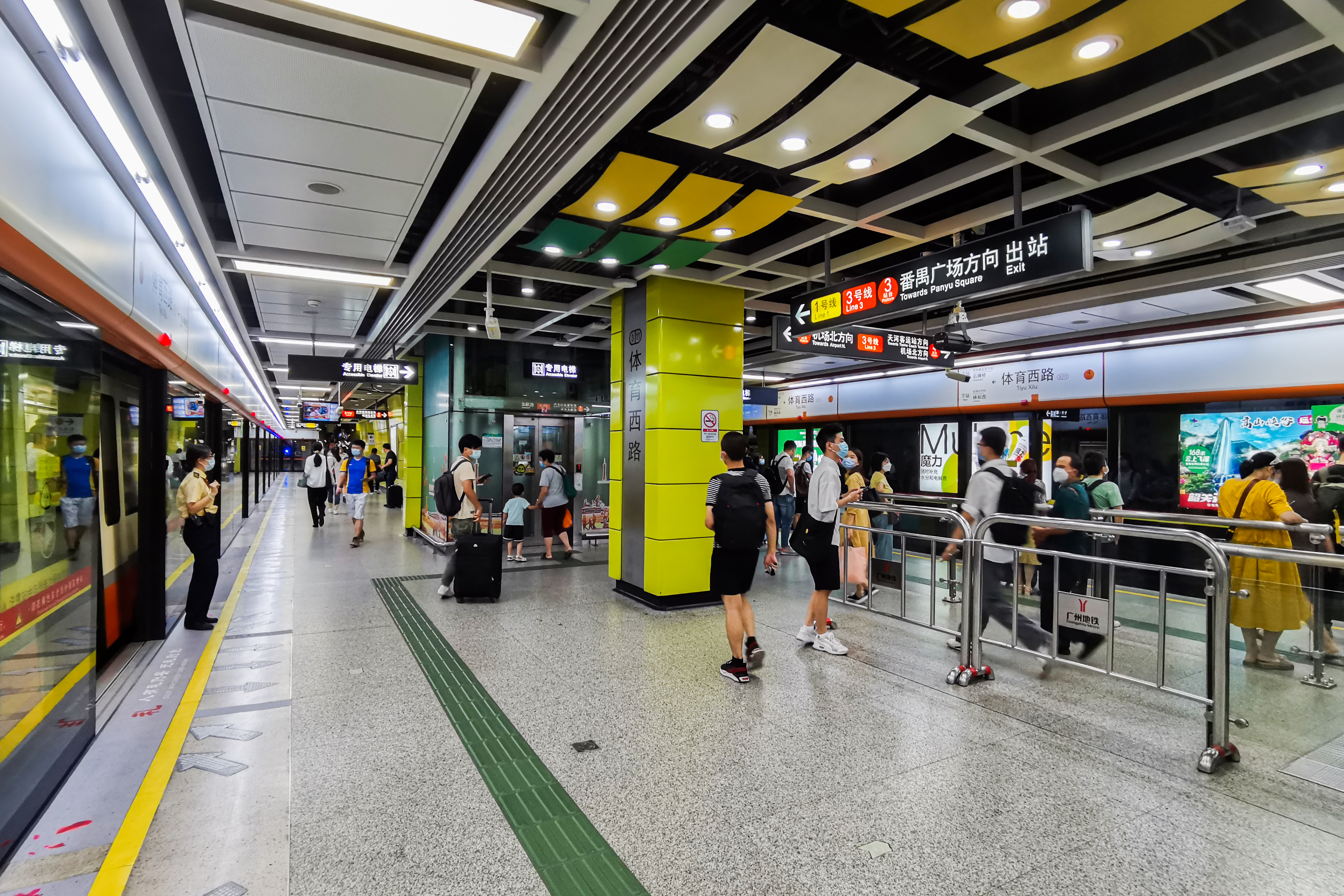
- Platform of Tiyu Xilu

Overview
- Other name(s): M3 (5 lines plan name); M6 (7 lines plan name); M3 (2000 plan name); Southern-Northern express line (南北快线); Shiqiao line (市桥线); Airport line (机场线)
- Status: Operational
- Owner: City of Guangzhou
- Locale: Panyu, Haizhu, Tianhe, Baiyun, and Huadu districts Guangzhou, Guangdong
- Termini: Tiyu Xilu/Haibang; Airport North (Terminal 2)/Tianhe Coach Terminal
- Stations: 34 (33 in operation)

Service
- Type: Rapid transit
- System: Guangzhou Metro
- Services: 2
- Operator: Guangzhou Metro Corporation
- Rolling stock: 120 Siemens Mobility-CRRC Zhuzhou Locomotive Modular Metro cars
- Daily ridership: 1.7204 million (Includes Airport Branch) (2025 Avg.); 2.759 million (2019 Main and Airport combined Peak)

History
- Opened: 26 December 2005; 20 years ago

Technical
- Line length: 74.83 km (46.50 mi)
- Number of tracks: 2
- Character: Underground
- Track gauge: 1,435 mm (4 ft 8 1/2 in)
- Electrification: Overhead lines, 1,500 V DC
- Operating speed: 120 km/h (75 mph)

Line 3
- Simplified Chinese: 广州地铁3号线
- Traditional Chinese: 廣州地鐵3號線
Transcriptions
Standard Mandarin
- Hanyu Pinyin: Guǎngzhōu Dìtiě Sān Hào Xiàn
Yue: Cantonese
- Jyutping: gwong^{2}zau^{1} dei^{6}tit^{3} saam^{1} hou^{6} sin^{3}

Shiqiao line
- Simplified Chinese: 市桥线
- Traditional Chinese: 市橋線
Transcriptions
Standard Mandarin
- Hanyu Pinyin: Shìqiáo Xiàn
Yue: Cantonese
- Jyutping: si^{5}kiu^{4} sin^{3}

Airport line
- Simplified Chinese: 机场线
- Traditional Chinese: 機場線
Transcriptions
Standard Mandarin
- Hanyu Pinyin: Jīchǎng Xiàn
Yue: Cantonese
- Jyutping: gei^{1}coeng^{4} sin^{3}

Line 3 of the Guangzhou Metro is a 74.83-kilometer (46.50 mi) rapid transit line that connects Haibang to Airport North (Terminal 2). The entire line, including all track and stations, is located in tunnels. Its 67.33 km (41.84 mi) main branch, excluding the 7.5 km (4.66 mi) branch between Tianhe Coach Terminal and Tiyu Xilu is now the second longest continuous subway tunnel in the world, and the longest rail tunnel of any kind (surpassing the Gotthard Base Tunnel in Switzerland). Line 3 is the busiest metro line of Guangzhou Metro system and also the busiest metro line in China.

Line 3 is split into two sections, Shiqiao line (main line, from Haibang to Tianhe Coach Terminal) and Airport line (northern branch, Tiyu Xilu to Airport North), and are branded with the colour orange. The line is extremely congested, with numerous sections officially operating over 100% capacity. The line uses Seltrac S40 communications-based train control from Alcatel.

Line 3 is the first metro line in China to adopt a "Y"-shaped route.

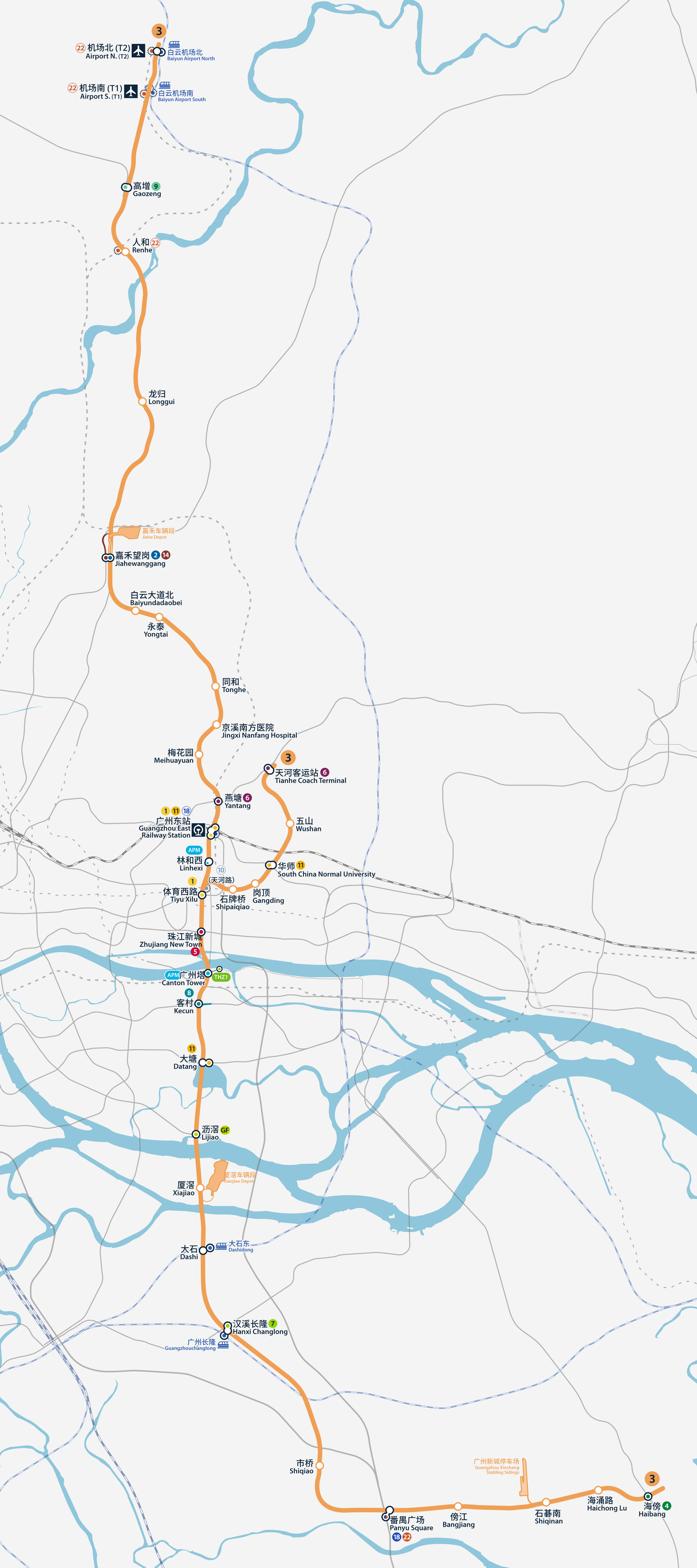
Line 3 drawn to scale.

== History ==
=== Initial section ===
Line 3 started out as a short peripheral line in Guangzhou's "Five-Line" subway masterplan in the early 1990s. It was envisioned as a north south circulator line for the Tianhe District's new CBD connecting Guangzhou East railway station with the proposed Zhujiang New Town CBD, crossing the Pearl River to Chigang station on what was then Line 2 and turning east to Xinzhou. Essentially taking over the section of Today's Line 8 between Chigang and Wanshengwei stations. However at the time it was planned to run under Liede Avenue just east of the new CBD instead of under Xiyu West Road like it does today. In Guangzhou's updated "Seven-Line" subway masterplan published in the late 1990s the proposed Line 3 plan was extended north to arc over old Guangzhou terminating around Chatou Station on Line 12 and Line 13. Additionally the southern section of the line was rerouted southwest roughly following today's Line 12 between Chigang and Luntou, with the section east to Xinzhou mostly being taken over by what is today Line 8.

Line 3 was redesigned into a pure north south line running between Guangzhou East Railway station to reach Panyu District. A branch line was added between Tiyu Xilu station and Tianhe Coach Terminal station. The change was done in response with the local government's "Southern Expansion" plan to develop the southern areas of Guangzhou. This plan required faster transportation links with Panyu District and the new CBD. At the time limited ridership of the first phases of Line 1 and 2 as well as underestimated urban growth rates lead to downscaling of Line 3's trains. The line would use three car Type B trains instead of higher capacity six car Type A trains used in Line 1 and 2; assuming that capacity shortfalls would be mitigated by running a more frequent service, with an ultimate train configuration of six cars in the future as demand slowly increases. Additionally, a separate Airport Express line between Guangzhou's New Baiyun International Airport and the new CBD was proposed.

Construction the first section of Line 3 between East Guangzhou Railway station and officially commenced with groundbreaking on the experimental segment at Datang station in 2001. On January 26, 2003, construction work at Datang was completed and capped. On February 8, 2003 tunnel boring machines begin boring tunnels on the first section of Line 3. Tunnel boring machines beginning boring tunnels on a section of Line 3 at Tiyu Xilu station. Tiyu Xilu Station will use cut-and-cover construction with a bored section in the middle where it runs under Line 1 with only 80 cm (31 in) of cover. On May 30, 2003 Construction work at Shiqiao station was completed and capped one month ahead of schedule. At the same time, Lijiao station begin construction works. 99 sets of escalators were purchased from Hitachi for the project. The entire project was opened in stages between 2005 and 2006.

=== North South Express Line ===
During construction of the initial segment, Line 3 and the Airport Express Line were redesigned and now planned as a single project that begins to resemble its configuration today; A line from Baiyun International Airport to Haibang station via Zhujiang New Town and Panyu Square. The Airport Express Line was merged into Line 3 as the Line 3 Phase 2 project. The expected long term peak demand section of the Phase 2 project is 20,000 passengers per hour per direction. This allowed for the use of Line 3's three car Type B trains on the Airport Line, again assuming that capacity shortfalls would be mitigated by running a more frequent service, with an ultimate train configuration of six cars in the future. Additionally, passing loops and higher speed (140 km/h (87 mph)) operations were proposed for the Airport Line to allow for distinct airport express and regular local services similar to the MTR Tung Chung line and Airport Express in Hong Kong. The express services would run between Guangzhou Baiyun International Airport and Tiyu Xilu and only stop at what is today Jiahewanggang, Yantang, Guangzhou East railway stations. The Phase 2 Project extends Line 3 north to the new airport on a mostly elevated alignment. In 2007, 17 km (10.56 mi) of Phase 2 line also redesigned to run underground instead of elevated at a cost of an additional 1 billion Yuan. With the redesigned underground alignment, passing loops for express services were removed to control construction costs. The line was now completely transformed into a north south express line with wide stop spacings and 120 km/h (75 mph) operation in suburban sections instead of a local metro line, with aspects of an express railway link, as first envisioned. Later Yongtai station and Gaozeng station was added to the plan the latter station added in anticipation for Line 9. On October 30, 2010 Line 3 Phase 2 entered operation.

=== Congestion ===
In 2010, after the completion of Phase 2, Line 3 has become the most important north-south traffic artery in the urban area of Guangzhou. This is a far cry from the peripheral circulator line it was originally envisioned to be in the 1990s. Massive developments at the Zhujiang New Town CBD and strong population growth of Guangzhou as a whole, created unforeseen high demand and heavy congestion for the line which forced new B2 and B4 series six car trains to be ordered and existing B1 series three car trains were linked together to form six car sets, decades ahead of the original timeline. The new B2 and B4 series trains will have luggage racks to support Line 3's role as an airport rail link. The new trains gradually allowed the line to operate to its ultimate configuration of six car type B trains running just at two minute headways. Severe congestion continued to plague the line even at its ultimate design configuration as demand continued to increase. In June 2014, the maximum full load rate in the morning peak of the whole line of Line 3 was as high as 136%, appearing in the interval between Kecun Station and Guangzhou Tower Station. In 2015, with daily average ridership reaching over 1.5 million passengers per day, several rows of seats and all luggage racks where removed from all trains in an attempt to increase capacity. In June 2017, the ridership of Line 3 has grown to average over 2 million passengers per day. In March 2018, the whole line heading in the peak direction of the Zhujiang New Town CBD exceeded 100% capacity during the AM peak period with a maximum full load rate exceeding 120% in the section from Yantang Station to Guangzhou East Station on the Airport Line. The busiest section of Line 3 carries over 60,000 pphpd in 2018, multiples over the long term 20,000 pphpd volume projected during the Airport Line's construction. By 2020, the most congested section of Line 3 reached 150% capacity. Peak period headways have been reduced to every 1 minute 58 seconds and now reaches fleet and signal system capacities. Line 18 and the proposed Line 26 are expected to relieve the congestion of Line 3.

=== Eastern extension ===
A further extension east of Haibang Station to Hai'ou Island and eventually across the Pearl River to Dongguan was proposed in 2007. In 2017, the Guangzhou Municipal Land Planning Commission approved the planning for Line 3 to be extended to Hai'ou Island. However, the extension eastward beyond Panyu Square station was approved by National Development and Reform Commission to only reach Haibang station as part of Guangzhou's (2015–2025) subway expansion plan in March 2018. It was revealed that the extension to Hai'ou Island is reserved for future planning. The extension is 9.58 km long as will add four new stations and connect Line 3 to Line 4. Construction of this extension started November 19, 2018. It opened just under 6 years later on November 1, 2024.

== Opening timeline ==
Segment	Commencement	Length	Station(s)	Name
Kecun — Guangzhou East Railway Station	26 December 2005	7.8 km (4.85 mi)	5	(northern section)
Panyu Square — Kecun	30 December 2006	19.6 km (12.18 mi)	7	(southern section)
Tiyu Xilu — Tianhe Coach Terminal	30 December 2006	7.5 km (4.66 mi)	5	(spur section)
Airport South — Guangzhou East Railway Station	30 October 2010	29.3 km (18.21 mi)	10	Northern extension
Gaozeng	28 December 2017	Infill station	1	Line 9 connector
Airport North — Airport South	26 April 2018	1.23 km (0.76 mi)	1	Airport extension
Haibang — Panyu Square	1 November 2024	9.6 km (5.97 mi)	4	Eastern extension
Airport South (Terminal 1)	7 May 2026		-1	Closed due to renovation of Baiyun Airport Terminal 1.

== Train service ==
Due to the existence of a branch in the middle of the line, and to balance demand for travel in all directions, there are a number of different service patterns operated on Line 3.

The following services run in both directions at all times:

- Airport North - Tiyu Xilu
- Airport North - Panyu Square
- Airport North - Haibang
- Tianhe Coach Terminal - Panyu Square
- Tianhe Coach Terminal - Haibang

During the morning peak, there are additional short working services:

- Tonghe - Tiyu Xilu
- Tianhe Coach Terminal - Dashi
- Airport North - Dashi

Other terminating stations (e.g. Jiahewanggang) are also possible when trains are entering or leaving service.

To assist passengers with identifying the correct service, trains bound for stations between Airport North and Tiyu Xilu (ie. the North Branch) will show on platform screens in green.

From 2:00am on 7 May 2026, Airport South (Terminal 1) station is temporarily closed and trains pass non-stop due to Terminal 1 of Baiyun Airport being temporarily closed for upgrading facilities.

== Stations ==
- N - Northern extension (Airport Branch)
- M - Main line
- MN - Thru Services
- OSI - Out-of-station interchange (only available for IC cards users)

N	M	MN	Station No.	Station name		Connections	Future Connections	Distance km		Location
N	M	MN	Station No.	English	Chinese	Connections	Future Connections	Distance km		Location
	●	●	301-4	Haibang	海傍	4 414		0.00	0.00	Panyu
	●	●	301-3	Haichong Lu	海涌路			2.00	2.00	Panyu
	●	●	301-2	Shiqinan	石碁南			1.90	3.90	Panyu
	●	●	301-1	Bangjiang	傍江			3.10	7.00	Panyu
	●	●	301	Panyu Square	番禺广场	18 1803 22 2201		2.40	9.40	Panyu
	●	●	302	Shiqiao	市桥			3.86	13.26	Panyu
	●	●	303	Hanxi Changlong	汉溪长隆	7 705 GH		6.27	19.53	Panyu
	●	●	304	Dashi	大石	ER (Dashi East)		2.44	21.97	Panyu
	●	●	305	Xiajiao	厦滘			2.85	24.82	Panyu
	●	●	306	Lijiao	沥滘	Guangfo GF25		1.85	26.67	Haizhu
	●	●	307	Datang	大塘	11 1130		2.57	29.24	Haizhu
	●	●	308	Kecun	客村	8 823		2.02	31.26	Haizhu
	●	●	309	Canton Tower	广州塔	APM APM01; THZ1 THZ101 OSI: 12 (Chigang Pagoda 1218)		1.15	32.41	Haizhu
	●	●	310	Zhujiang New Town	珠江新城	5 510		1.51	33.92	Tianhe
●	●	●	311	Tiyu Xilu	体育西路	1 114 GBRT; OSI: APM (TianhenanAPM07)	10; OSI: 13 (Huacheng Square North) 1315	1.31	35.23	Tianhe
｜	●	｜	312	Shipaiqiao	石牌桥	GBRT		1.34	36.57	Tianhe
｜	●	｜	313	Gangding	岗顶	GBRT		0.85	37.42	Tianhe
｜	●	｜	314	South China Normal University	华师	11 1106		0.88	38.30	Tianhe
｜	●	｜	315	Wushan	五山			1.59	39.89	Tianhe
｜	●	｜	316	Tianhe Coach Terminal	天河客运站	6 621		2.59	42.48	Tianhe
●		●	317	Linhexi	林和西	APM APM09		1.15	36.38	Tianhe
●		●	318	Guangzhou East Railway Station	广州东站	1 116 11 1108; GS GGQ	18	1.09	37.47	Tianhe
●		●	319	Yantang	燕塘	6 620		1.07	38.54	Tianhe
●		●	320	Meihuayuan	梅花园			1.90	40.44	Baiyun
●		●	321	Jingxi Nanfang Hospital	京溪南方医院			1.36	41.80	Baiyun
●		●	322	Tonghe	同和			1.39	43.19	Baiyun
●		●	323	Yongtai	永泰			3.34	46.53	Baiyun
●		●	324	Baiyundadaobei	白云大道北			0.85	47.38	Baiyun
●		●	325	Jiahewanggang	嘉禾望岗	2 224 14 1409		2.25	49.63	Baiyun
●		●	326	Longgui	龙归			6.30	55.93	Baiyun
●		●	327	Renhe	人和		22	5.37	61.30	Baiyun
●		●	328	Gaozeng	高增	9 911		2.46	63.76	Baiyun
|		|	329	Airport South (Terminal 1)	机场南（1号航站楼）	CAN ER	22	3.81	67.57	Huadu
●		●	330	Airport North (Terminal 2)	机场北（2号航站楼）	22 CAN ER		1.23	68.80	Huadu

== Future expansion ==
=== Line 10 ===
The Tiyu Xilu-Tianhe Coach Terminal Section is planned to no longer operate as part of Line 3. The Shipaiqiao-Tianhe Coach Terminal Section will be transferred to Line 10, with the remaining Main and Northern sections being combined into one single service.

== Rolling stock ==
At the time of introduction Line 3 trains were one of the fastest subway trains in China when initially introduced, reaching up to 120 km/h (75 mph) in service. As of 2020 there is a fleet of 71 six car trains serving Line 3. To accommodate increased fleet requirements for the eastern extension, an additional 10 six car trainsets have been ordered. In August 2020, plans were announced a further 18 additional trains to be purchased for Line 3 to reduce headways and improve capacity. This will push the fleet serving Line 3 to 99 trainsets.

Type	Time of manufacturing	Series	Sets	Assembly	Notes
Type B	2005–2007	B1	20	Mcp+T+Mcp=Mcp+T+Mcp	Manufactured by CRRC Zhuzhou Locomotive and Siemens Mobility initially as 40 three car sets but later reformed into 20 six car sets.
Type B	2009–2011	B2	25	Mc+Tp+M+M+Tp+Mc	First batch manufactured by CRRC Zhuzhou Locomotive
Type B	2011–2012	B4	26	Mc+Tp+M+M+Tp+Mc	Second batch manufactured by CRRC Zhuzhou Locomotive
Type B	2021–2023	B10	10	Mc+Tp+M+M+Tp+Mc	Third batch manufactured by CRRC Zhuzhou Locomotive
Type B	2022–2023	B11	18	Mc+Tp+M+M+Tp+Mc	Manufactured by CRRC Changchun Railway Vehicles

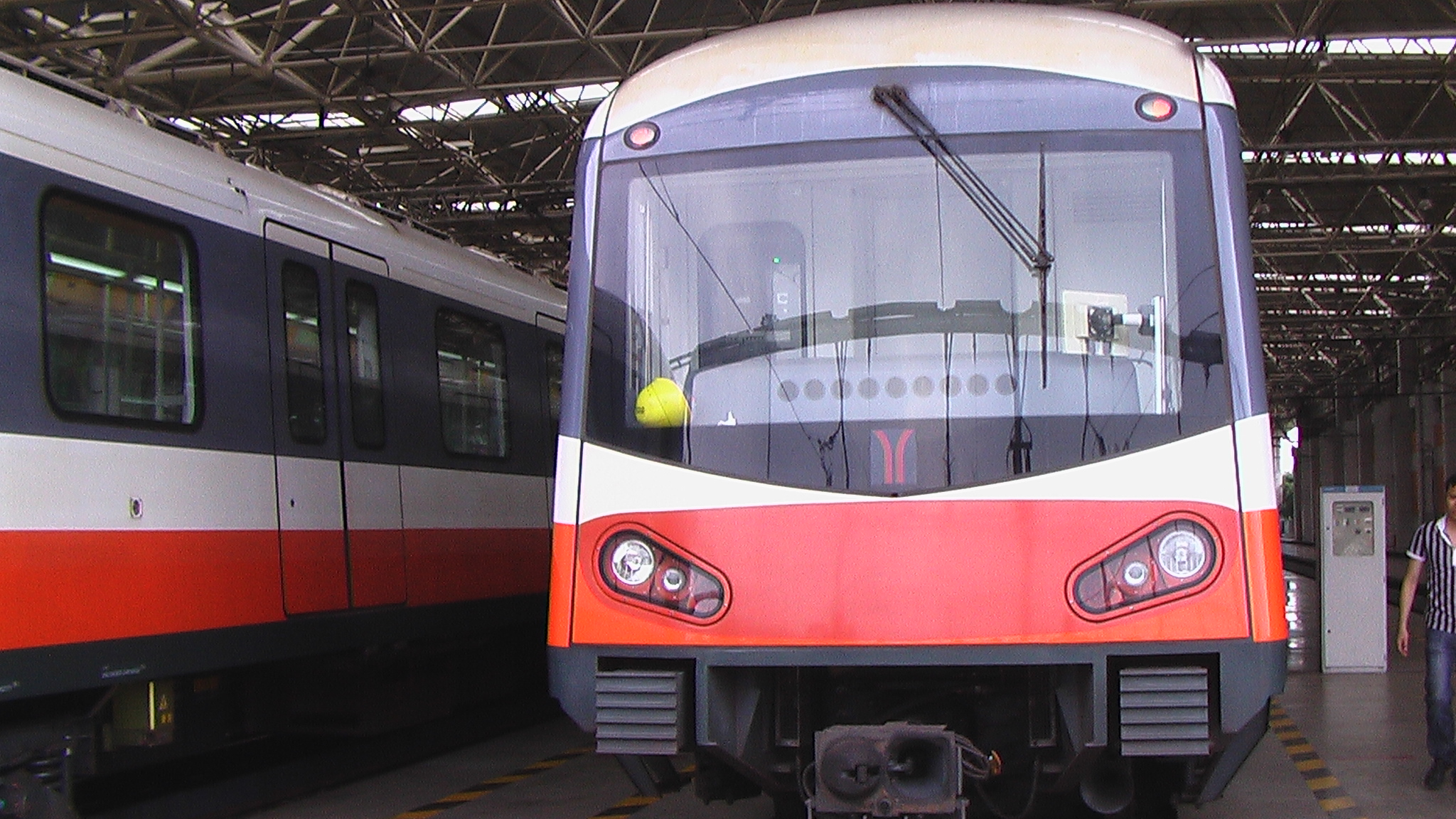
Guangzhou Metro B1

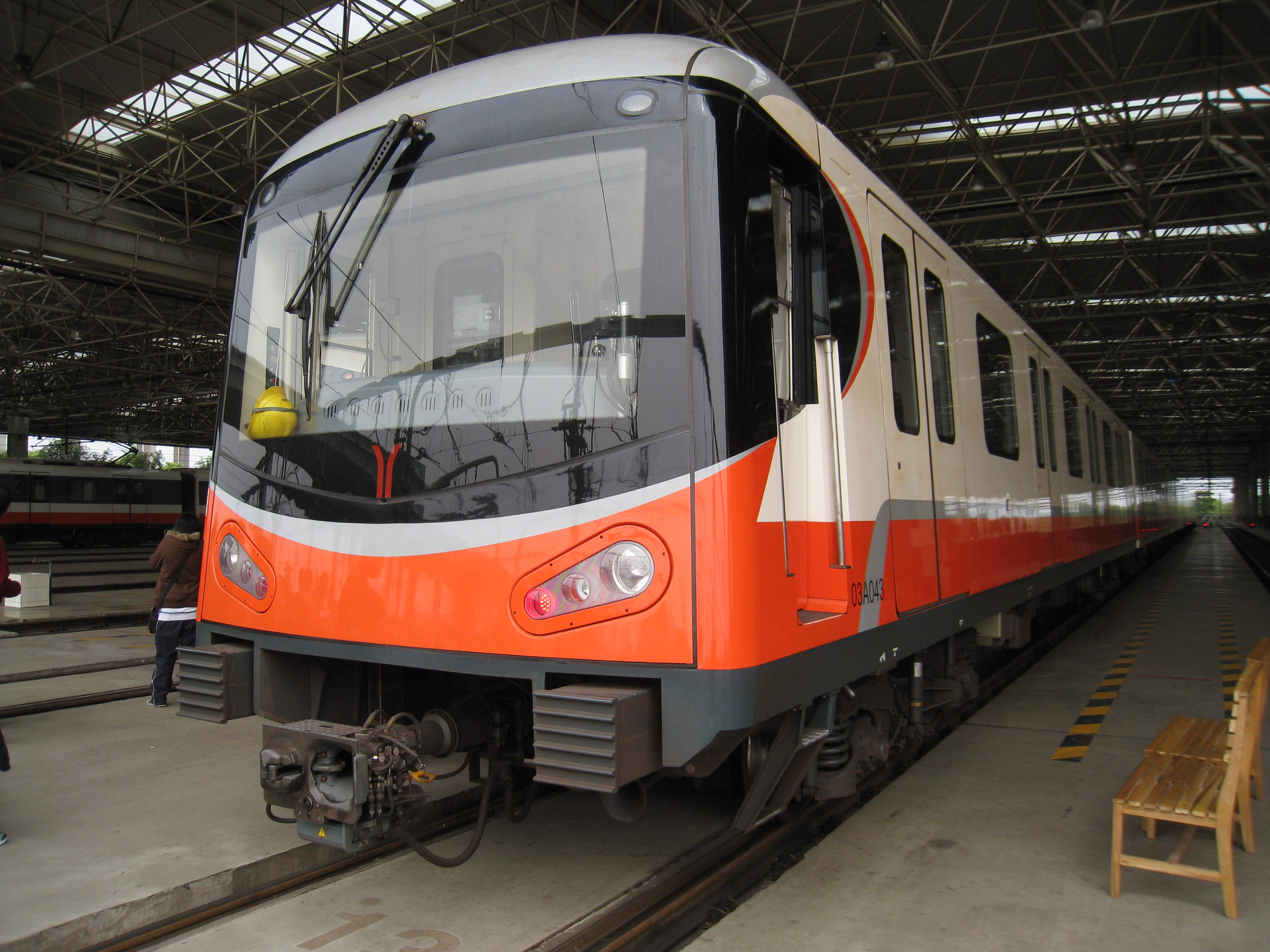
Guangzhou Metro B2

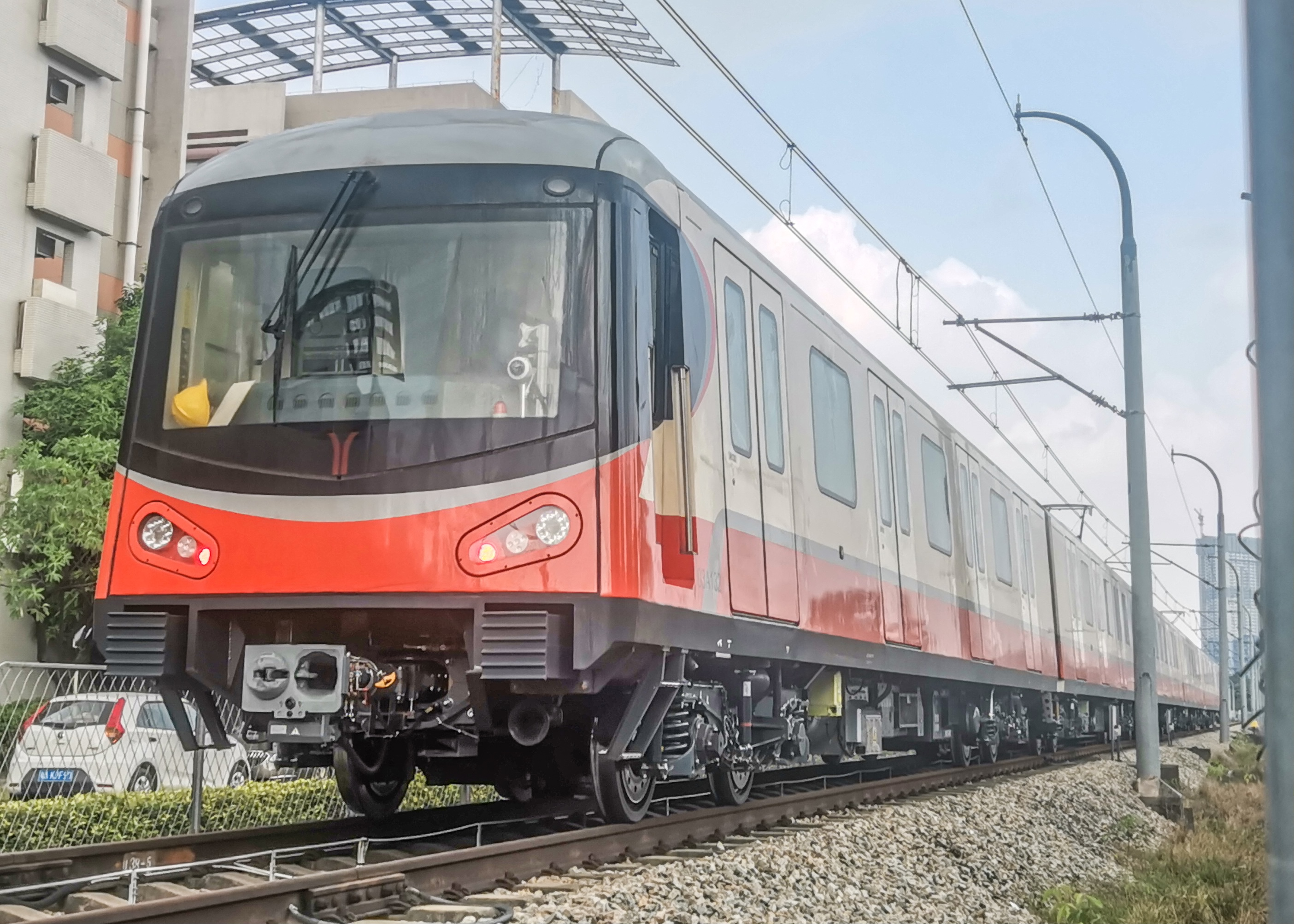
Guangzhou Metro B4

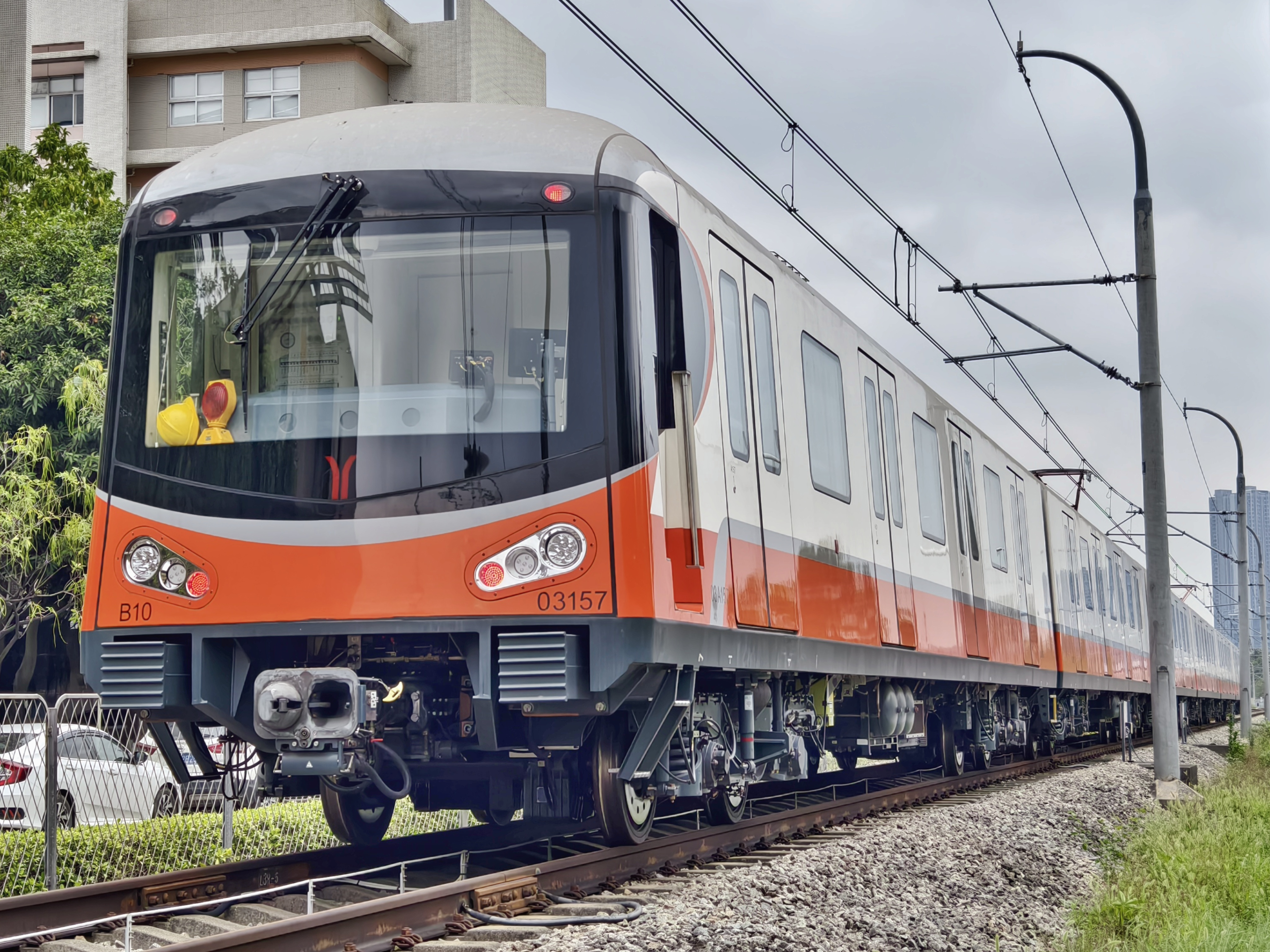
Guangzhou Metro B10

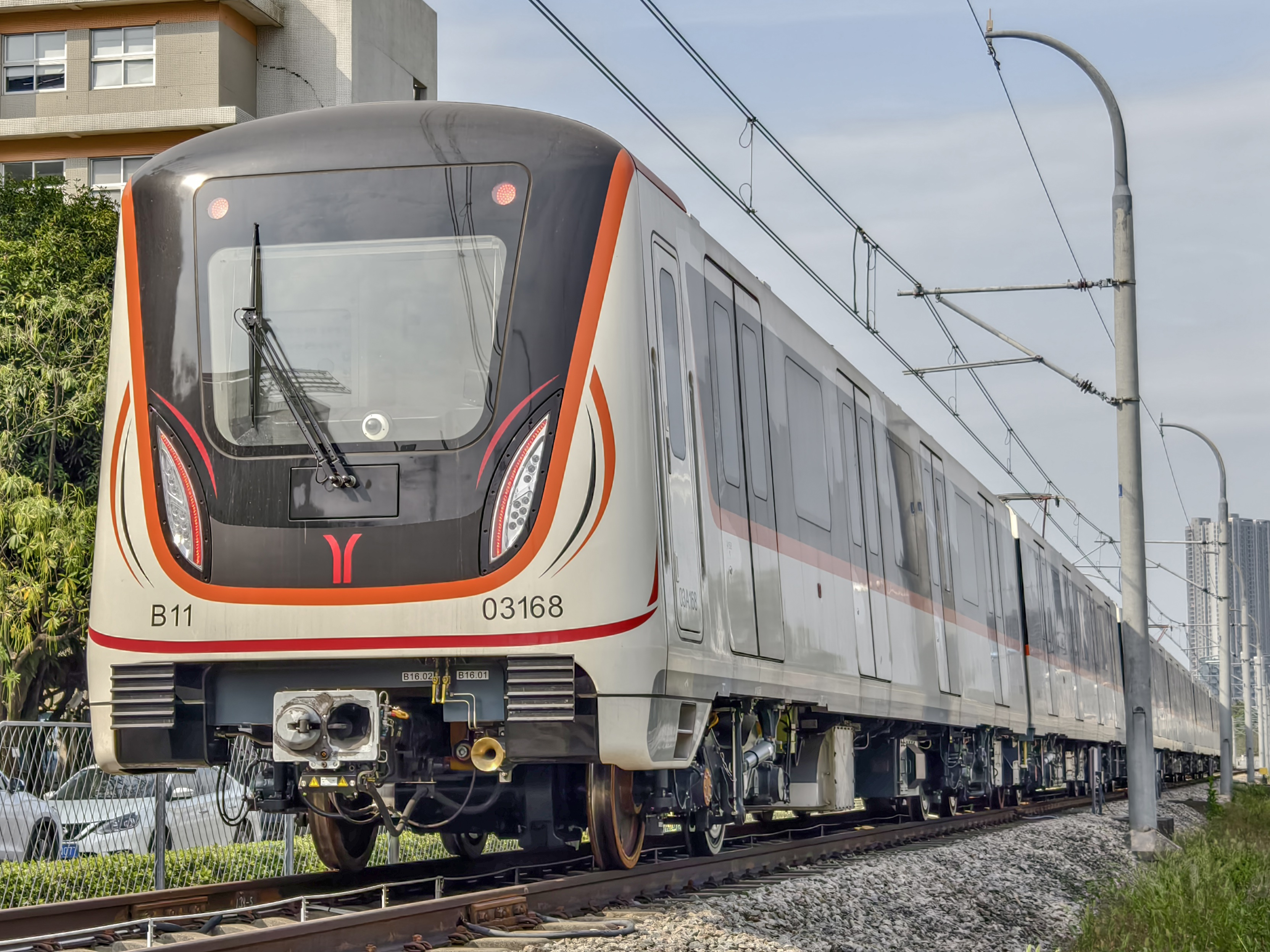
Guangzhou Metro B11
