= Baiyundadaobei station =

Guangzhou Metro station

Coordinates: 23.2231°N 113.2985°E

Baiyundadaobei 白云大道北

Chinese name
- Simplified Chinese: 白云大道北站
- Traditional Chinese: 白雲大道北站
- Literal meaning: Baiyun Avenue North station
Transcriptions
Standard Mandarin
- Hanyu Pinyin: Báiyún Dàdào Běi Zhàn
Yue: Cantonese
- Yale Romanization: Baahk'wàhn Daaihdouh Bāk Jaahm
- Jyutping: Baak^{6}wan^{4} Daai^{6}dou^{6} Bak^{1} Zaam^{6}
- Hong Kong Romanization: Pak Wan Avenue North station

General information
- Location: Baiyun District, Guangzhou, Guangdong; China
- Operator: Guangzhou Metro Co. Ltd.
- Line: Line 3
- Platforms: 2 (1 island platform)

Construction
- Structure type: Underground

Other information
- Station code: 324

History
- Opened: 30 October 2010; 16 years ago

Services
Preceding station	Guangzhou Metro	Following station
Yongtai towards Haibang	Line 3	Jiahewanggang towards Airport North (Terminal 2)
Location

Baiyundadaobei station (simplified Chinese: 白云大道北站; traditional Chinese: 白雲大道北站; Cantonese Yale: Baahk'wàhn Daaihdouh Bāk Jaahm), formerly Yongtai station (永泰站) during planning, is a metro station on Line 3 of the Guangzhou Metro. The underground station is located at the intersection of Guangcong Highway (广从公路) and Jianpeng Road (尖彭路) in the Baiyun District. It started operation on 30 October 2010.
