= Tonghe station =

Guangzhou Metro station

Tonghe 同和

Chinese name
- Chinese: 同和站
Transcriptions
Standard Mandarin
- Hanyu Pinyin: Tónghé Zhàn
Yue: Cantonese
- Yale Romanization: Tùhng'wòh Jaahm
- Jyutping: Tung^{4}wo^{4} Zaam^{6}
- Hong Kong Romanization: Tung Wo station

General information
- Location: Baiyun District, Guangzhou, Guangdong; China
- Operator: Guangzhou Metro Co. Ltd.
- Line: Line 3
- Platforms: 2 (1 island platform)

Construction
- Structure type: Underground

Other information
- Station code: 322

History
- Opened: 30 October 2010; 16 years ago

Services
Preceding station	Guangzhou Metro	Following station
Jingxi Nanfang Hospital towards Haibang	Line 3	Yongtai towards Airport North (Terminal 2)
Location

Tonghe Station (Chinese: 同和站; Cantonese Yale: Tùhng'wòh Jaahm) is a metro station on Line 3 of the Guangzhou Metro. The underground station is located at the intersection of Guangzhou Avenue (广州大道) and Tongsha Road (同沙路) in the Baiyun District of Guangzhou. It started operation on 30 October 2010.
