= Jingxi Nanfang Hospital station =

Guangzhou Metro station

Coordinates: 23.18531°N 113.3262°E

Jingxi Nanfang Hospital 京溪南方医院
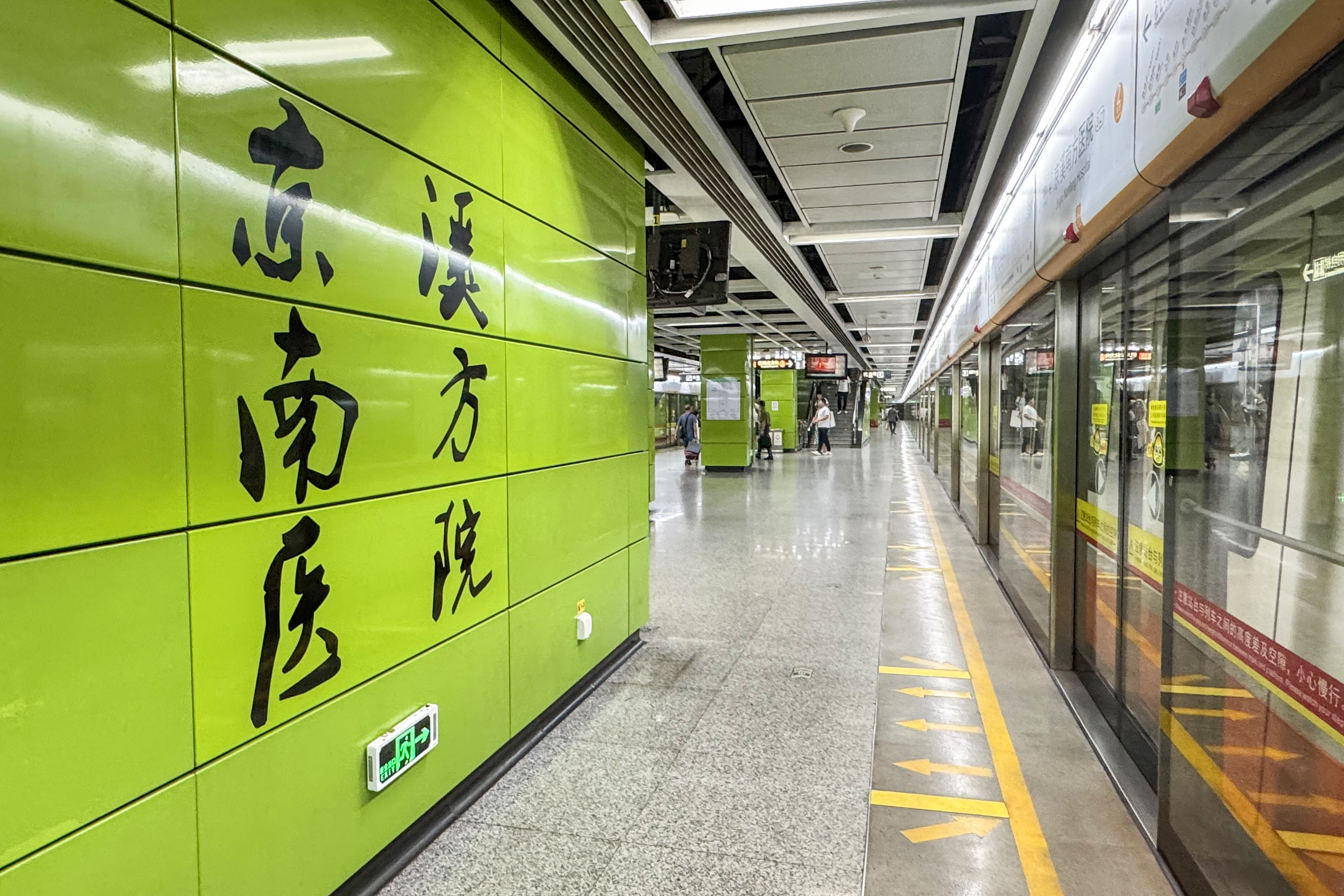
- Platform 2

Chinese name
- Simplified Chinese: 京溪南方医院站
- Traditional Chinese: 京溪南方醫院站
- Literal meaning: Jingxi Southern Hospital station
Transcriptions
Standard Mandarin
- Hanyu Pinyin: Jīngxī Nánfāng Yīyuàn Zhàn
Yue: Cantonese
- Yale Romanization: Gīngkāi Nàahmfōng Yīyún Jaahm
- Jyutping: Ging^{1}kai^{1} Naam^{4}fong^{1} Ji^{1}jyun^{2} Zaam^{6}
- Hong Kong Romanization: King Kai Nam Fong Hospital station

General information
- Location: Baiyun District, Guangzhou, Guangdong; China
- Operated by: Guangzhou Metro Co. Ltd.
- Line: Line 3
- Platforms: 2 (1 island platform)

Construction
- Structure type: Underground

Other information
- Station code: 321

History
- Opened: 30 October 2010; 15 years ago

Services
Preceding station	Guangzhou Metro	Following station
Meihuayuan towards Haibang	Line 3	Tonghe towards Airport North (Terminal 2)
Location

Jingxi Nanfang Hospital Station (simplified Chinese: 京溪南方医院站; traditional Chinese: 京溪南方醫院站; Cantonese Yale: Gīngkāi Nàahmfōng Yīyún Jaahm) is a metro station on Line 3 of the Guangzhou Metro. The underground station is located at Guangzhou Avenue North (广州大道北) near Nanfang Hospital (南方医院) in the Baiyun District. It started operation on 30 October 2010.

Its name is a combination of nearby Jingxi Village (京溪村) and Nanfang Hospital, in order to favour the benefits of both locations. Its Chinese name is currently one of the two stations which has the longest used by the Guangzhou Metro system, with six Chinese characters in total, the other one being Baiyun Culture Square station.

== Station layout ==
G	Street level	Exit
L1; Concourse	Lobby	Customer Service, Shops, Vending machines, ATMs, Flight information
L2; Platforms	Platform 1	3 towards Haibang (Meihuayuan)
L2; Platforms	Island platform, doors will open on the left
L2; Platforms	Platform 2	3 towards Airport North (Tonghe)

== Exits ==
Exit number	Exit location
Exit C	Guangzhou Dadaobei
Exit D	Guangzhou Dadaobei
