= Siemens Nexas =

Rolling stock in use on the Melbourne rail network

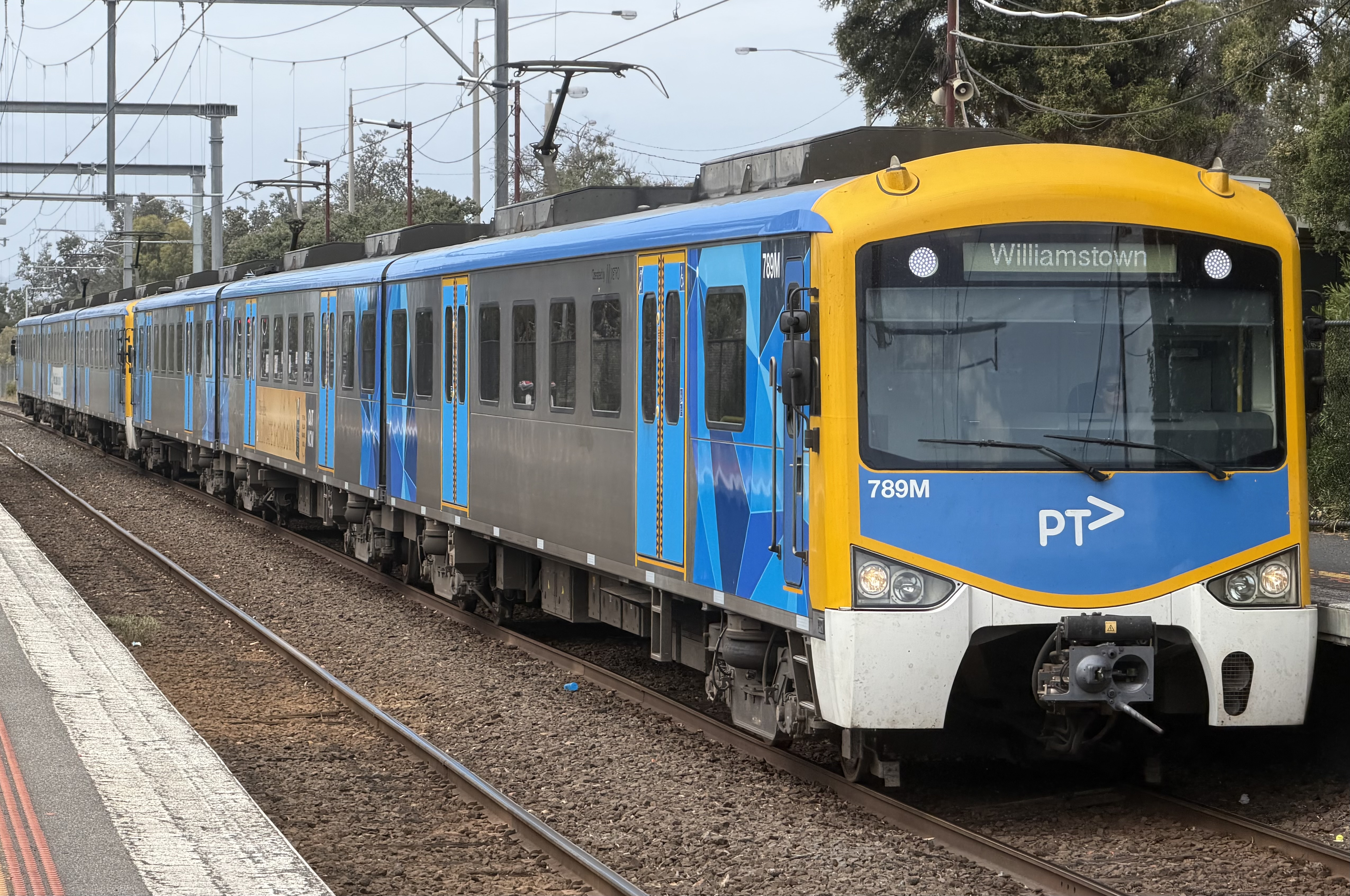
- Refurbished Siemens Nexas 789M at Seaford station, January 2026

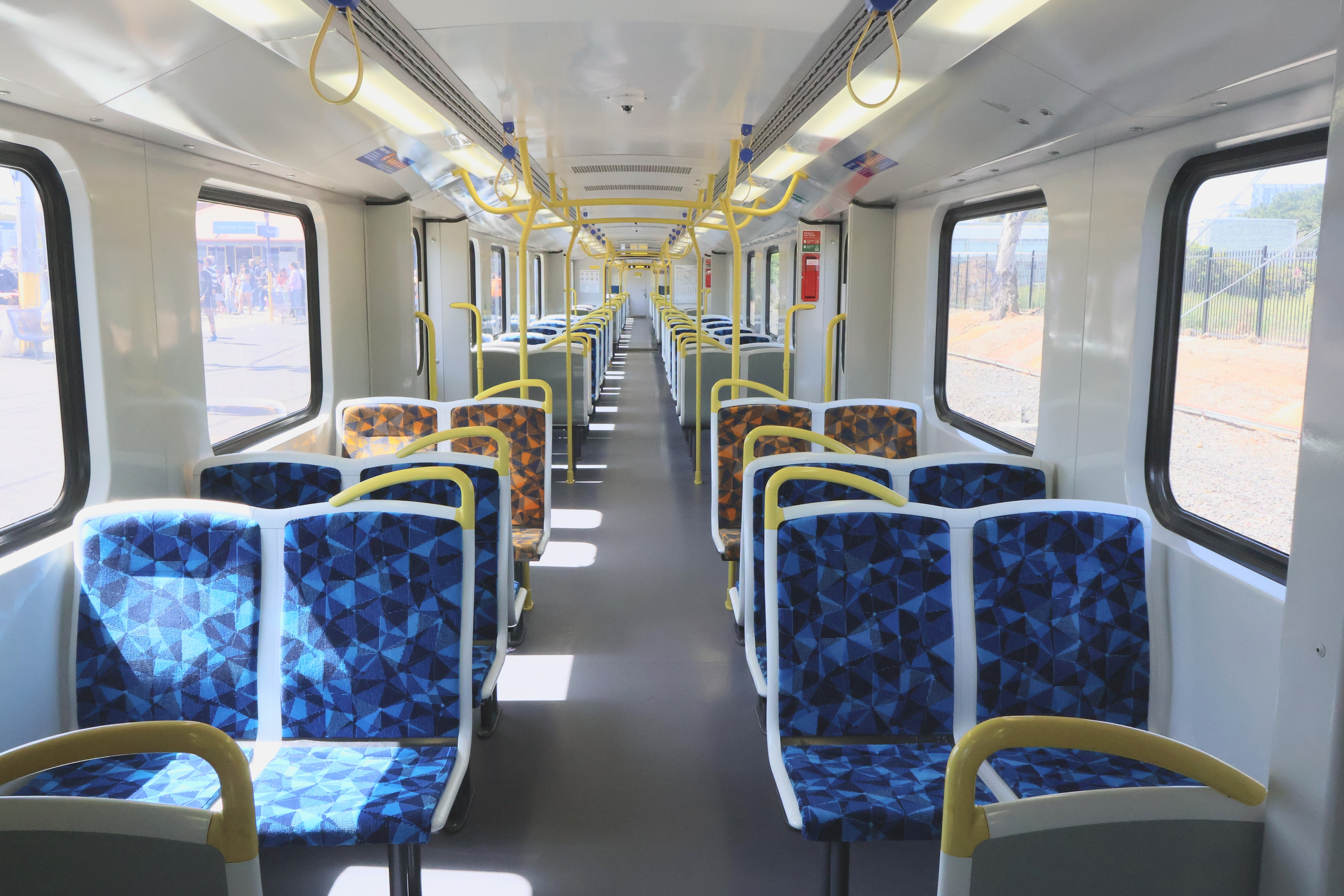
- Refurbished interior
- In service: 2003–present
- Manufacturer: Siemens Transportation Systems
- Built at: Vienna, Austria
- Family name: Modular Metro
- Replaced: Hitachi
- Constructed: 2002–2005
- Entered service: 3 April 2003
- Number built: 216 carriages (72 sets)
- Number in service: 216 carriages (72 sets)
- Formation: 3-car sets (M–T–M)
- Fleet numbers: 701M–844M (driving motors); 2501T–2572T (trailers)
- Capacity: Until 2016: 264 seated per 3-car set; Since 2016: 216 seated per 3-car set
- Operator: Metro Trains Melbourne
- Lines served: Sandringham Werribee Williamstown; Craigieburn Upfield; Frankston; Flemington Racecourse

Specifications
- Car body construction: Stainless steel single deck
- Train length: 71.91 m (235 ft 11 1/8 in)
- Car length: M: 24.07 m (78 ft 11 5/8 in); T: 23.77 m (77 ft 11 13/16 in)
- Width: 2.95 m (9 ft 8 1/8 in)
- Height: 4,141 mm (13 ft 7 1/16 in)
- Floor height: 1.23 m (4 ft 7/16 in)
- Doors: Twin-leaf plug, 2 × 2 per car
- Wheel diameter: 850–770 mm (33–30 in) (new–worn)
- Wheelbase: 2.6 m (8 ft 6 in)
- Maximum speed: 147 km/h (91 mph) (design); 115 km/h (71 mph) (service)
- Weight: 41.5 t (40.8 long tons; 45.7 short tons) (driving motors, tare); 37.8 t (37.2 long tons; 41.7 short tons) (trailers, tare)
- Axle load: 18.5 t (18.2 long tons; 20.4 short tons)
- Traction system: Siemens G1500 D1100/400 M5-1 IGBT–VVVF
- Traction motors: 8 × Siemens 1TB2016-0GB02 250 kW (340 hp) asynchronous 3-phase AC
- Acceleration: 1.2 m/s^{2} (3.9 ft/s^{2}) (design); 1 m/s^{2} (3.3 ft/s^{2}) (service)
- Deceleration: 1 m/s^{2} (3.3 ft/s^{2}) (service); 1.3 m/s^{2} (4.3 ft/s^{2}) (emergency)
- Electric systems: 1,500 V DC (nominal) from overhead catenary
- Current collection: Pantograph
- UIC classification: Bo′Bo′+2′2′+Bo′Bo′
- Bogies: SF 5000 E TDG (powered), SF 5000 LDG (trailer)
- Minimum turning radius: 118 m (387 ft 2 in)
- Coupling system: Dellner
- Track gauge: 1,600 mm (5 ft 3 in) broad gauge

The Siemens Nexas is a type of electric multiple unit manufactured by Siemens Transportation Systems for the suburban railway network of Melbourne, Australia between 2002 and 2005. The design of the trains was based on the Siemens Modular Metro.

== History ==
In March 2000, M>Train ordered 62 Siemens Nexas trains to fulfill a franchise commitment to replace its fleet of Hitachi trains.

The original order was for 62 3-car sets, with an option for an additional ten 3-car sets. In December 2002 just before the first was delivered, National Express handed the M>Train franchise back to the Government of Victoria, thus the first Siemens Nexas trains were delivered to the government. All passed to Connex Melbourne in April 2004. The option for ten additional trains was exercised in August 2005, with the last of these delivered in January 2006.

Siemens Rail Services was contracted to provide maintenance of the trains for a period of 15 years (subject to refranchising) at Newport Workshops. With the refranchising of the network to Metro Trains Melbourne in 2009, this maintenance arrangement was retained for an initial three-year period.

These trains first entered service on 3 April 2003 with the last delivered in January 2006.

== Braking problems ==
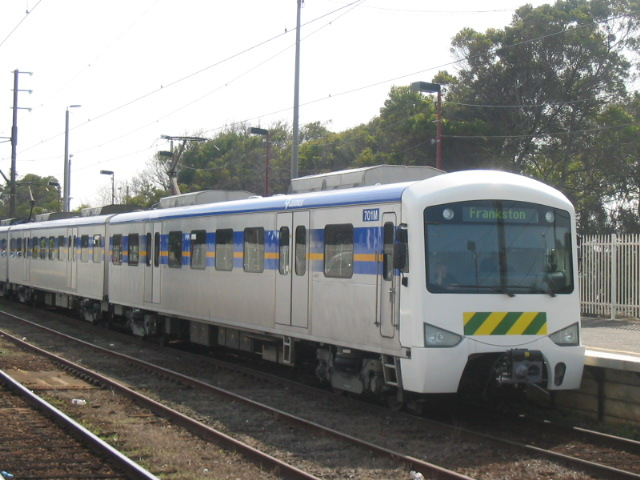
A Siemens Nexas train, operated by Connex Melbourne, at Mordialloc station, December 2005

In late 2006, the trains suffered a number of braking problems while in service. 14 trains overshot platforms in the space of three days. The units involved in the overshoots were withdrawn from service for checks, and instructions were issued to drivers to minimise further occurrences. By mid-January 2007, a total of 24 three-carriage trains had been impounded for testing, following 20 further incidents of over-running stations since 22 December 2006.

On 13 January 2007, Connex stopped running the Siemens Nexas trains as 3-car sets until the braking problem was resolved, with the result that all services (including at evenings and weekends) were operated by 6-car trains. On 29 January 2007, Connex cancelled 37 peak-period services until further notice, due to the shortage of operational trains.

By 1 February 2007, 38 three-car sets had been withdrawn due to continuing braking failures, meaning that more than half of the Siemens Nexas fleet (about 10% of the total fleet) was out of revenue service. Amidst the media reporting an escalating problem with the risk of the entire fleet potentially having to be suspended, Siemens issued a statement on 31 January 2008 saying that they believed there had been no evidence during investigations that would require the entire fleet of trains being withdrawn from service. In an effort to replicate the brake fault, testing of affected trains was carried out on the Werribee line between Newport and Laverton, with soapy water sprayed onto the rails to increase the amount of wheel slip experienced. The entire fleet was eventually returned to service, although they were not to be run as single (3 car) units.

In December 2008, train operator Connex commenced proceedings in the Supreme Court to claim damages from Siemens. Connex claimed Siemens provided trains with a braking system that was "defective, faulty and inadequate", the trains being "not fit for their purpose" and were not of "merchantable quality".

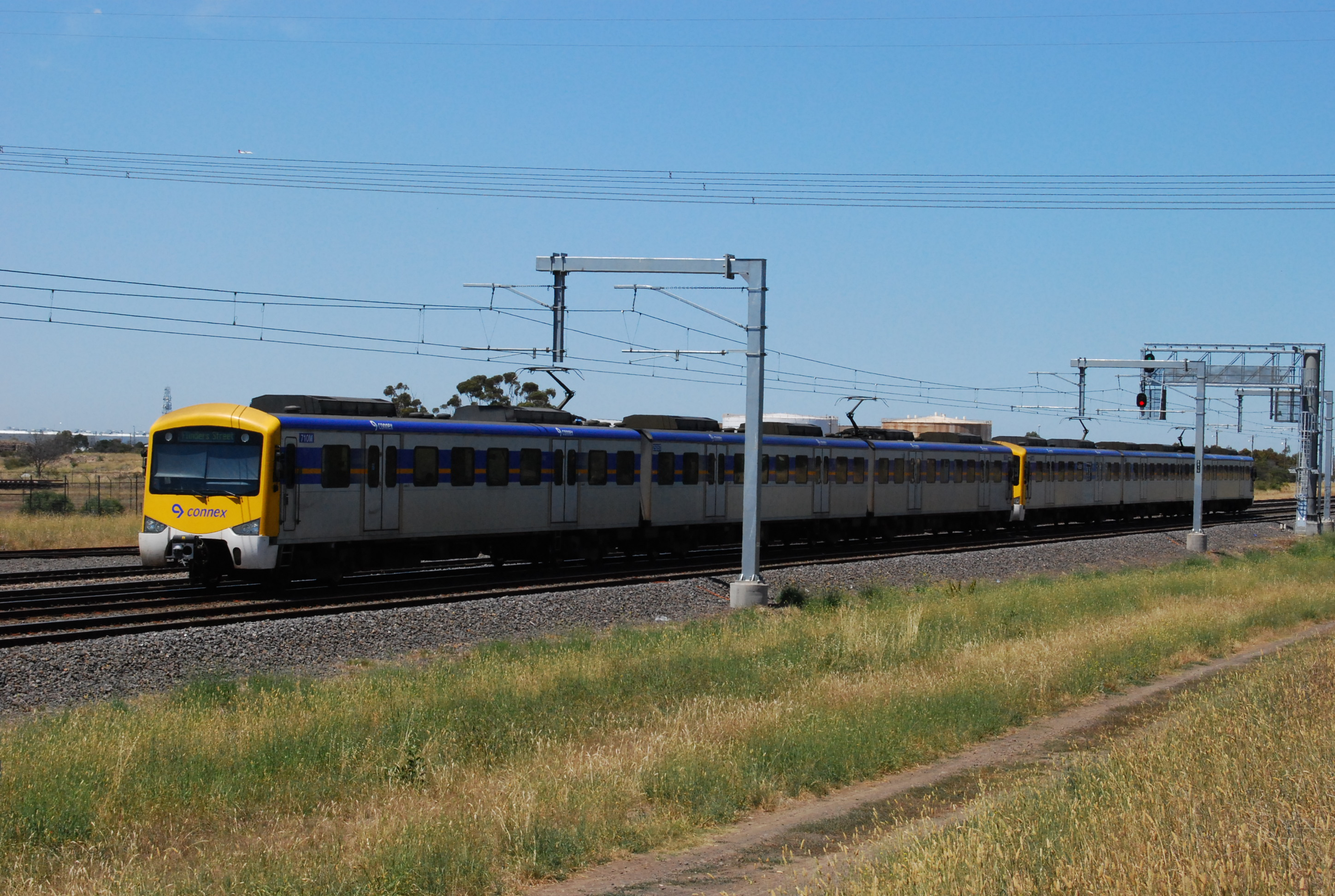
A six-car Nexas set led by 710M, operated by Connex Melbourne between Craigieburn and Roxburgh Park, January 2009

In March 2009, it was reported that three Siemens Nexas trains had been impounded due to new braking incidents in the week prior.

By December 2010, sanding equipment had been trialled on set 773M-2537T-774M in order to improve the braking performance of the trains, and, by February 2011, a number of trains had also been fitted with the equipment. The sand boxes were fitted to the middle two bogies of each 3-car set.

In June 2011, installation of sanding equipment was completed across the entire fleet, and speed restrictions on all Siemens Nexas trains were lifted.

In September 2011, the Office of the Chief Investigator, Transport Safety, found that "the relatively high frequency of overruns involving Nexas trains was neither the result of individual train defects nor any deficiency in train maintenance".

== Design and construction ==
The bodies of the Siemens Modular Metro trains evolved from the 1993 DT2 Series used in the Nuremberg U-Bahn whose design in turn came from production of the A Series built for the nearby Munich U-Bahn.

The version of Siemens metro train designed for Melbourne included several attributes similar to existing Melbourne suburban electric trains such as being single-deck and operating in M-T-M (motor-trailer-motor) sets of three carriages, where the motor cars each have an overhead pantograph, and two of these 3-car sets are generally coupled together to form a 6-carriage train when run in revenue service, though a single set may be run when demand does not merit a full train.

All were built by Siemens Transportation Systems, Vienna, with the final fitout completed at Newport Workshops.

There are several notable differences between the Siemens Nexas trains and other trains which operate in Melbourne. These include:

- 2+2 seating. All other trains had 2+3 seating, however X'Trapolis 100 trains ordered as part of the 2008 Victorian Government Transport Plans have the same 2+2 seating configuration, and existing X'Trapolis trains had their seats modified to a 2+2 configuration as part of the franchise agreement.
- Two doors per carriage per side. Being significantly wider they were theorised to be slightly more efficient in loading and unloading passengers, although this is disputed by some sources, who believe the fewer doors lead to longer platform dwell times compared to the three smaller doors in other Melbourne trains.
- Plug-type doors – hinged outward and slide along the outside of the vehicle when opening.
- Extreme smooth, vertical walls.
- Open articulation. Passengers can freely move from carriage to carriage, within a 3-carriage set, without opening doors, the first such train with this configuration in Melbourne.

The Siemens Nexas trains are fitted with a passenger information system produced by the German firm Annax. The system does not announce service details at the commencement of a journey, express running or the end of services.

In June 2008, Connex started a program to replace the seat coverings in a number of Siemens Nexas trains, using the same type of fabric as used in the X'Trapolis 100 trains. However, Metro Trains Melbourne put in new seating fabric displaying various stations around the network before the recent refurbishment which saw them changed to a geometric design featuring blue triangles and orange rectangles for priority seats.

== Refurbishment ==
In 2016, Metro Trains Melbourne began refurbishing the interior carriages of Siemens Nexas trains. All windguards and glass screens were removed from the doorways and replaced with a smaller vertical handrail (except where wheelchair access is required), a number of seats removed near the doors and extra vertical and horizontal handrails fitted to improve comfort and capacity. A cleaning program occurred at the same time, which included fitting new seat pads and covers, re-painting walls and applying anti-graffiti film to the windows. As of August 2017, the entire fleet had been refurbished. A similar refurbishment has been completed on the older Comeng trains. In 2019, Metro Trains Melbourne began to replace the Gangway systems. The new Hübner System has at the floor an articulated bridge system instead of the plate system. Also the sound insulation and the behavior of the bellows system has been improved.

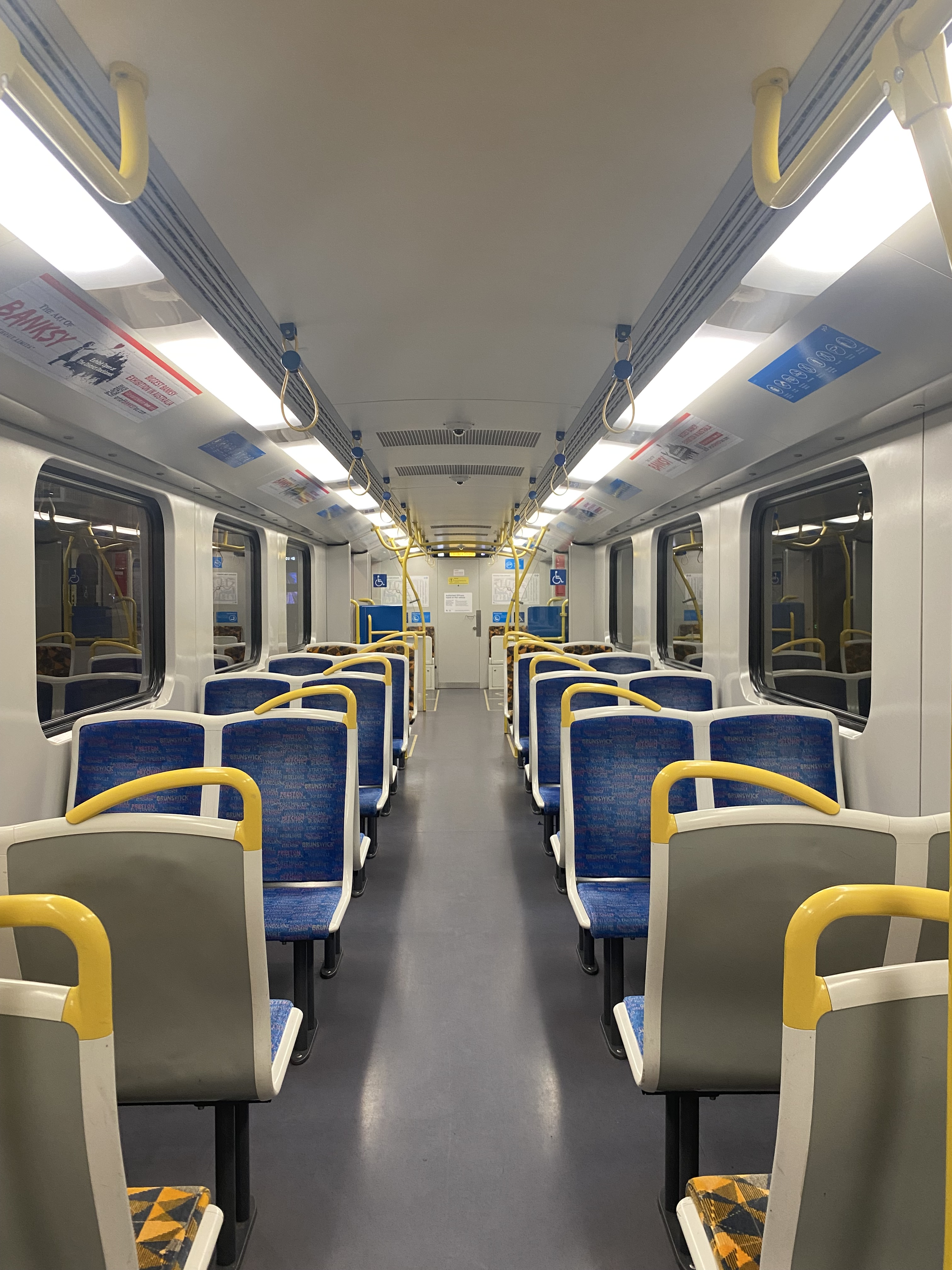
The old Siemens Nexas Seating pattern with stations names around the Melbourne train system. This seating pattern has since being replaced by the new PTV blue pattern seen from the start with the existing PTV orange seating pads.

In August 2022, Metro Trains Melbourne completed a mid-life refurbishment on two 3-car sets in the fleet, thus comprising one full six-car set (747M-2524T-748M and 809M-2555T-810M). The two coupled sets were first documented running on 22 August 2022. The refurbishment included an updated passenger information system; overhauling the display and the station announcements. Other improvements include updated CCTV, improved lighting, PA upgrades and a brand new interface for emergency driver communication.

In early 2024, the Siemens Nexas fleet began to receive a refurbished interior, with the old blue Melbourne train system station names seat fabric replaced with the current PTV blue design. It also includes an improved emergency intercom system, a wheelchair assistance button, and additional grab poles. In a separate project, they had new dynamic information displays added, similar to the Stage 3 Comeng, showing the next few stops and the line colour.

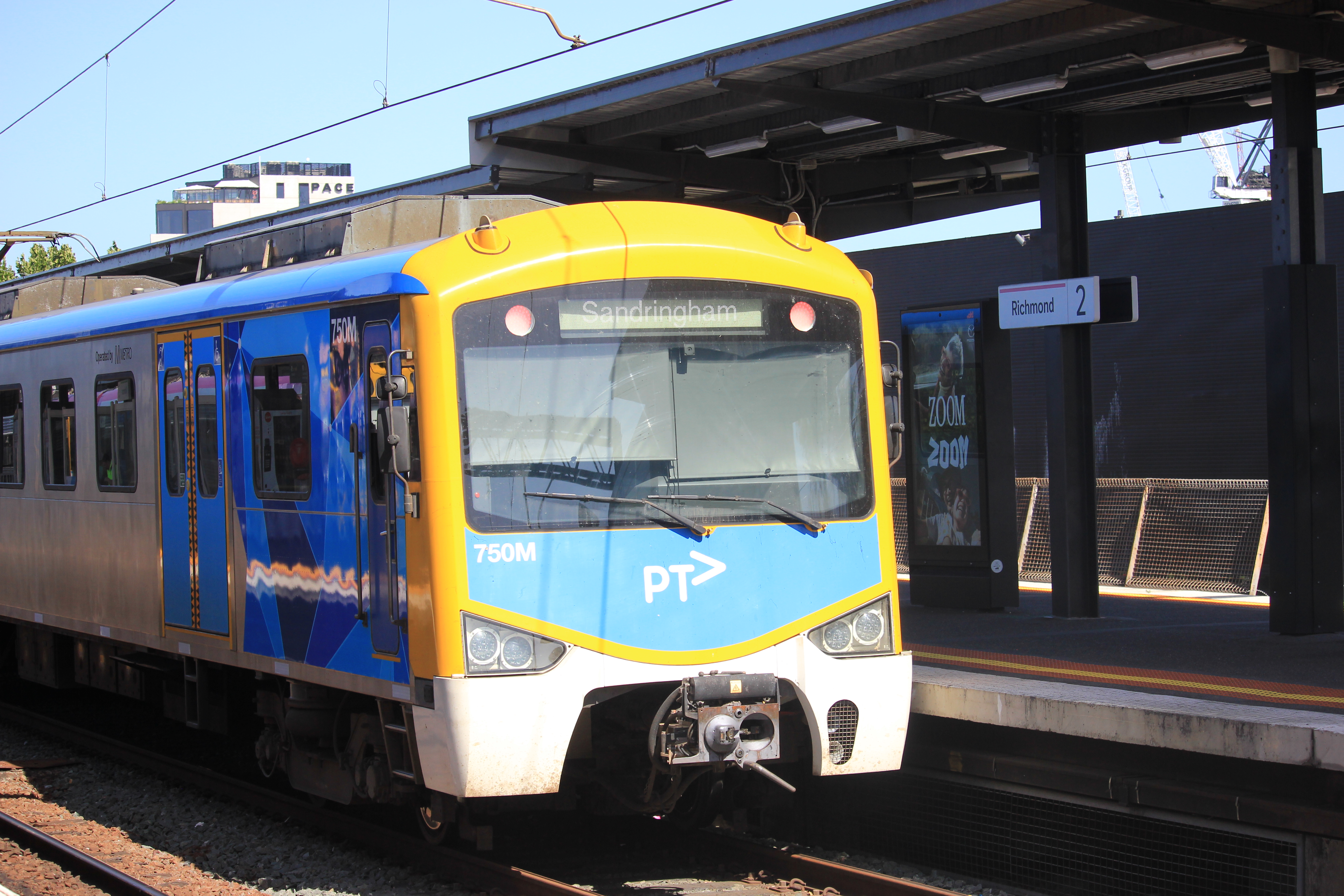
Siemens Nexas at Richmond station in 2022 PTV livery, January 2025

== Liveries ==
The Siemens Nexas trains have a stainless steel body, and were seen in a number of different liveries in their early years, owing to the changes in ownership that have occurred while the trains were entering service.

The trains were originally delivered with M>Train blue and green stripes on the side, and the M>Train 'swirl' on the front fairing. Later deliveries entering service in bare metal on the sides, and white front fairings with a green and yellow striped bar. On entering Connex Melbourne ownership, blue and yellow stripes were progressively added to the side of all trains, and front fairings were repainted yellow with the blue Connex logo.

After Metro Trains Melbourne took over the operation of the suburban network in November 2009, the Connex logo on all trains was covered over as a temporary measure, with all sets progressively being repainted into Metro livery, a process completed in March 2010.

In December 2022, Siemens Nexas train 741M-2521T-742M first received the PTV/2022 livery on Siemens Nexas Fleet, featuring removal of company branding, and yellow door outlines (now matching the new HCMT fleet). From early 2024, the rest of the Siemens Nexas Fleet began to receive the new livery.
