= B1 (Guangzhou Metro car) =

Rolling stock of Guangzhou Metro Line 3

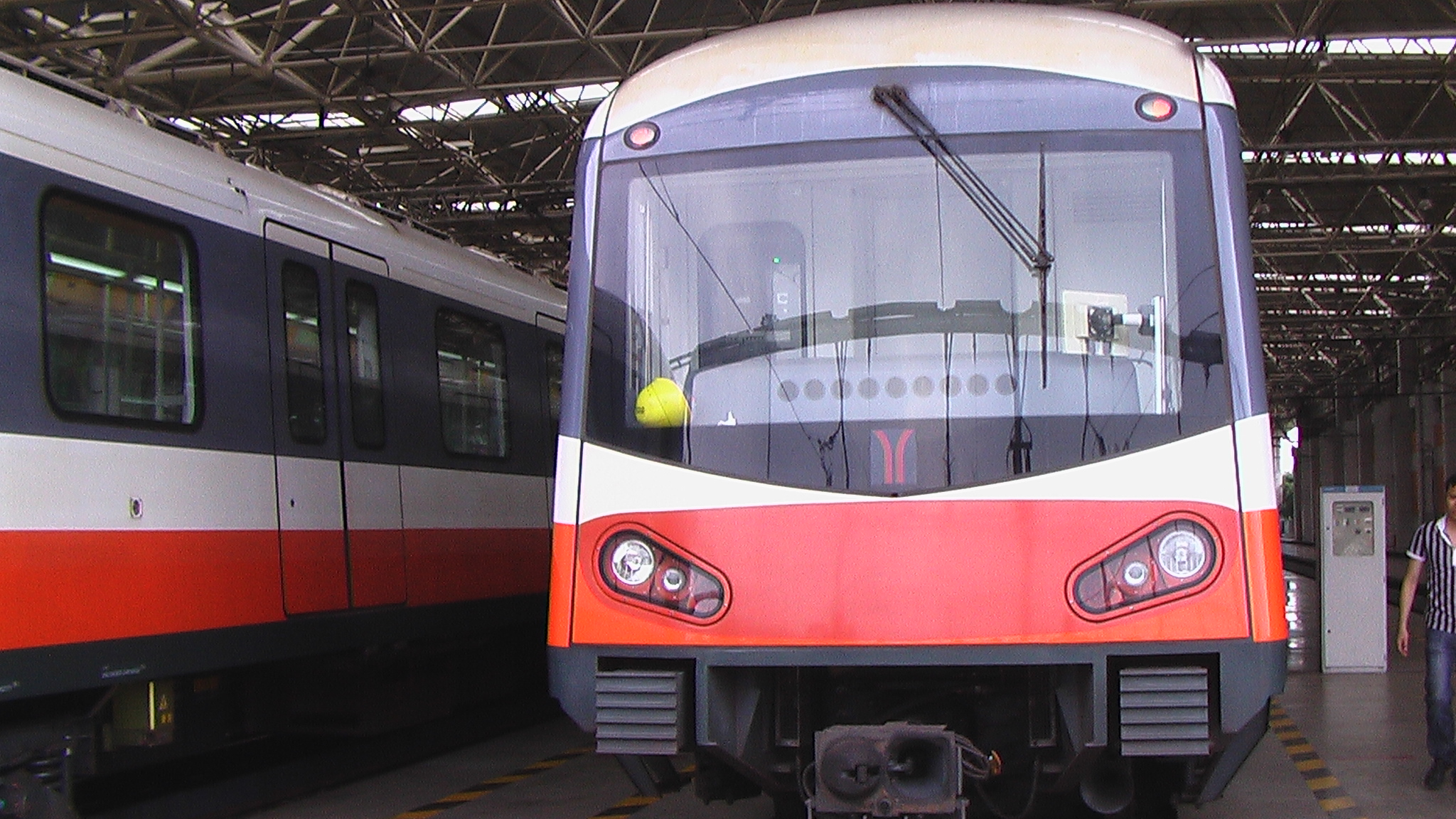
- B1 train at Xiajiao Depot
- Stock type: Class B EMU
- In service: 26 December 2005; 20 years ago - present
- Manufacturers: Siemens Mobility, CSR Zhuzhou Locomotive
- Built at: Zhuzhou, China
- Family name: Modular Metro
- Constructed: 2005-2007
- Entered service: 26 December 2005; 20 years ago
- Number built: 120
- Number in service: 120
- Formation: Mcp-T-Mcp
- Fleet numbers: 03A001~03A002-03A039~03A040
- Capacity: 240 per car
- Operator: Guangzhou Metro Group
- Depots: Xiajiao Depot; Jiahe Depot
- Line served: 3

Specifications
- Car body construction: Aluminum alloy
- Train length: 59.94 m (196 ft 8 in)
- Car length: 19.98 m (65 ft 7 in)
- Width: 2.8 m (9 ft 2 in)
- Height: 3.8 m (12 ft 6 in)
- Doors: Electric doors
- Maximum speed: 120 km/h (75 mph)
- Traction system: Siemens Mobility G1500 D1000/300 M5-1 IGBT-VVVF
- Traction motors: Siemens Mobility 1TB2013-1GA02 3-phases AC induction motors
- Acceleration: Maximum 0.9 km/(h⋅s) (0.559 mph/s)
- Deceleration: 1.0 km/(h⋅s) (0.621 mph/s) (service); 1.3 km/(h⋅s) (0.808 mph/s) (emergency)
- Electric systems: 1,500 V DC
- Current collection: Single-arm Pantograph
- UIC classification: Bo′Bo′+2′2′+Bo′Bo′
- Bogies: Siemens Mobility SF2500
- Track gauge: 4 ft 8 1/2 in (1,435 mm)

The B1 (commonly known as Guangzhou Metro Line 3 Train) is a class of rolling stock built for Line 3 of Guangzhou Metro. They are built by Siemens Mobility and CSR Zhuzhou Locomotive. B1 is the first mass-produced B-class rolling stock for the Guangzhou Metro. They entered service on 26 December 2005.

B1 units are double-paired for service since 20 April 2010, to expand the service capacity of Line 3.

== Description ==
The B1 features Siemens traction motors, Knorr EP-2002 electronic braking systems, plug-style doors and electronic strip maps.

== History ==
The B1 contract was awarded to Siemens Mobility on 19 May 2003, who won the A1 contract before. The first train completed on 18 November 2005.

On 8 January 2010, the first train (set 03x001-002) received an overhaul at Xiajiao Depot.

== Roster ==
Formation	03A0xx (Tcp)	03B0xx (T)	03C0xx (Tcp)
Numbers	03A001 ∥ 03A039	03B001 ∥ 03B039	03C001 ∥ 03C039

- Mcp – Motor car with drive cab and pantograph
- T – Trailer car
