= Yongtai station =

Guangzhou Metro station

Coordinates: 23.220226°N 113.306295°E

Yongtai 永泰
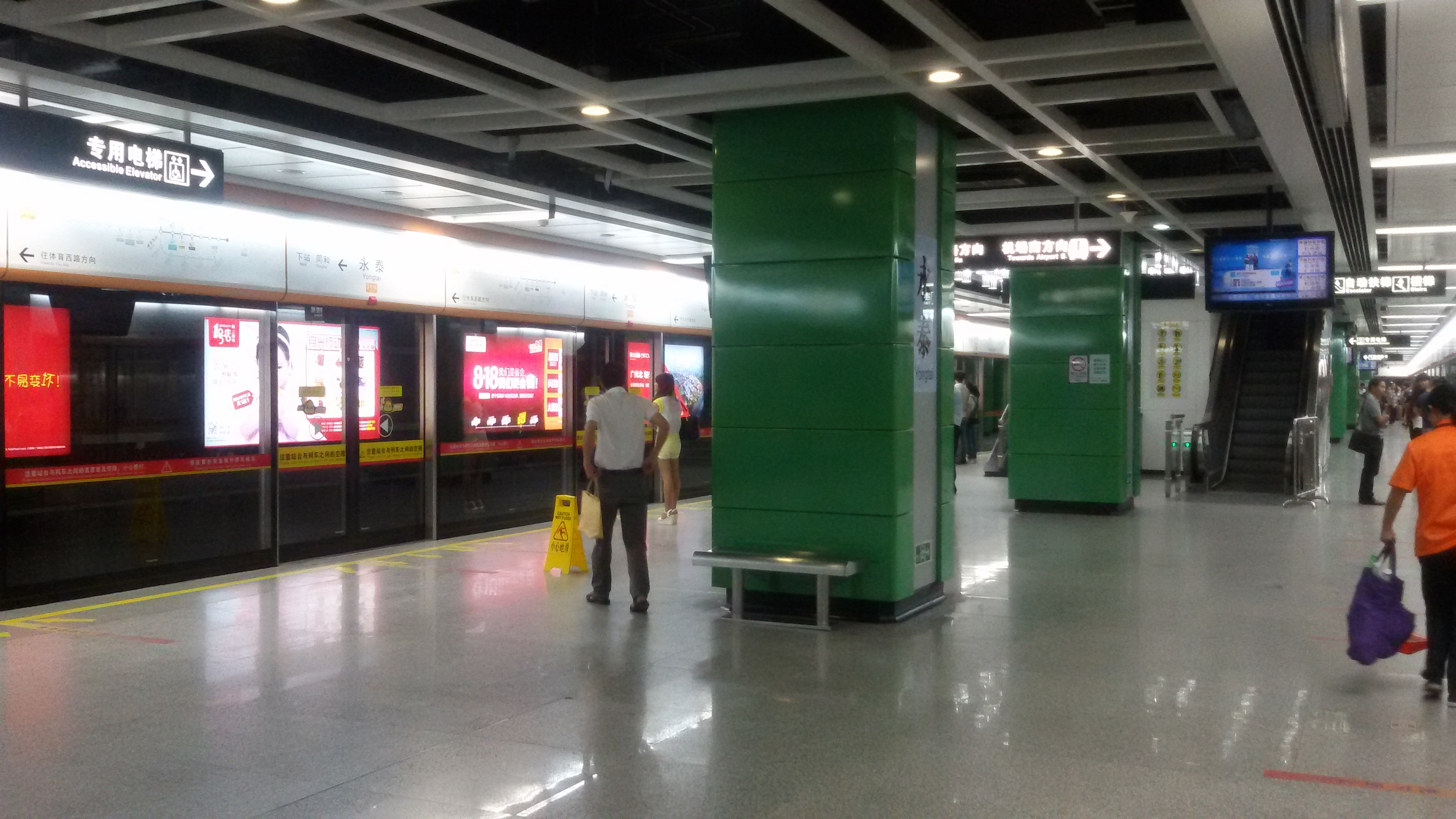

Chinese name
- Chinese: 永泰站
Transcriptions
Standard Mandarin
- Hanyu Pinyin: Yǒngtài Zhàn
Yue: Cantonese
- Yale Romanization: Wíhngtaai Jaahm
- Jyutping: Wing^{5}taai^{3} Zaam^{6}
- Hong Kong Romanization: Wing Tai station

General information
- Location: Baiyun District, Guangzhou, Guangdong; China
- Operated by: Guangzhou Metro Co. Ltd.
- Line: Line 3
- Platforms: 2 (1 island platform)

Construction
- Structure type: Underground

Other information
- Station code: 323

History
- Opened: 30 October 2010; 15 years ago

Services
Preceding station	Guangzhou Metro	Following station
Tonghe towards Haibang	Line 3	Baiyundadaobei towards Airport North (Terminal 2)
Location

Yongtai station (Chinese: 永泰站; Cantonese Yale: Wíhngtaai Jaahm), formerly Yongtai East station (永泰东站) during planning, is a metro station on Line 3 of the Guangzhou Metro. The underground station is located at the north of Huanan Expressway (华南快速干线) and Tongtai Road (同泰路) in the Baiyun District and started operation on 30 October 2010.
