= Siemens Modular Metro =

German electric multiple unit trains (1997-pres.)

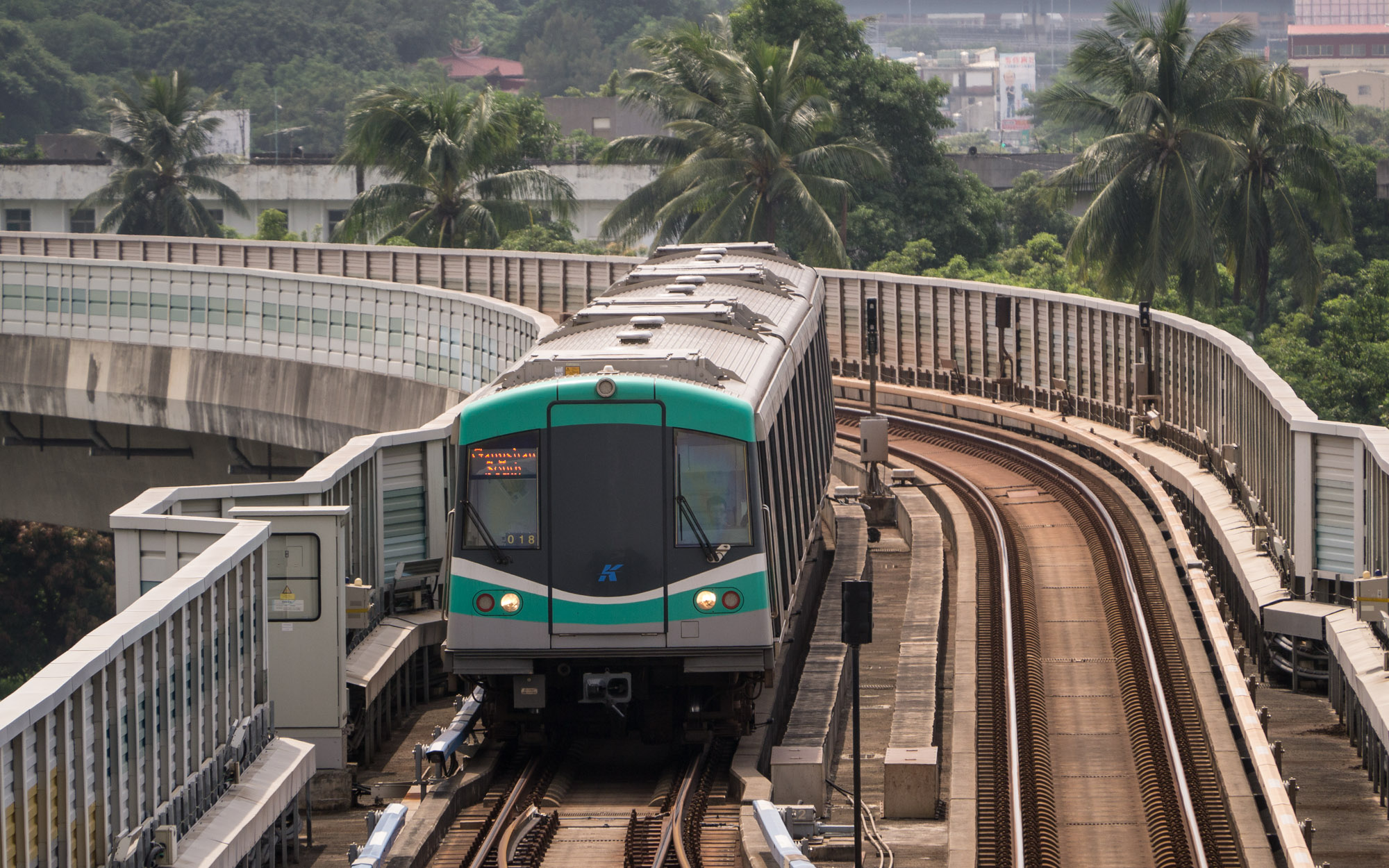
- A Siemens Modular Metro for the Kaohsiung Metro in Taiwan

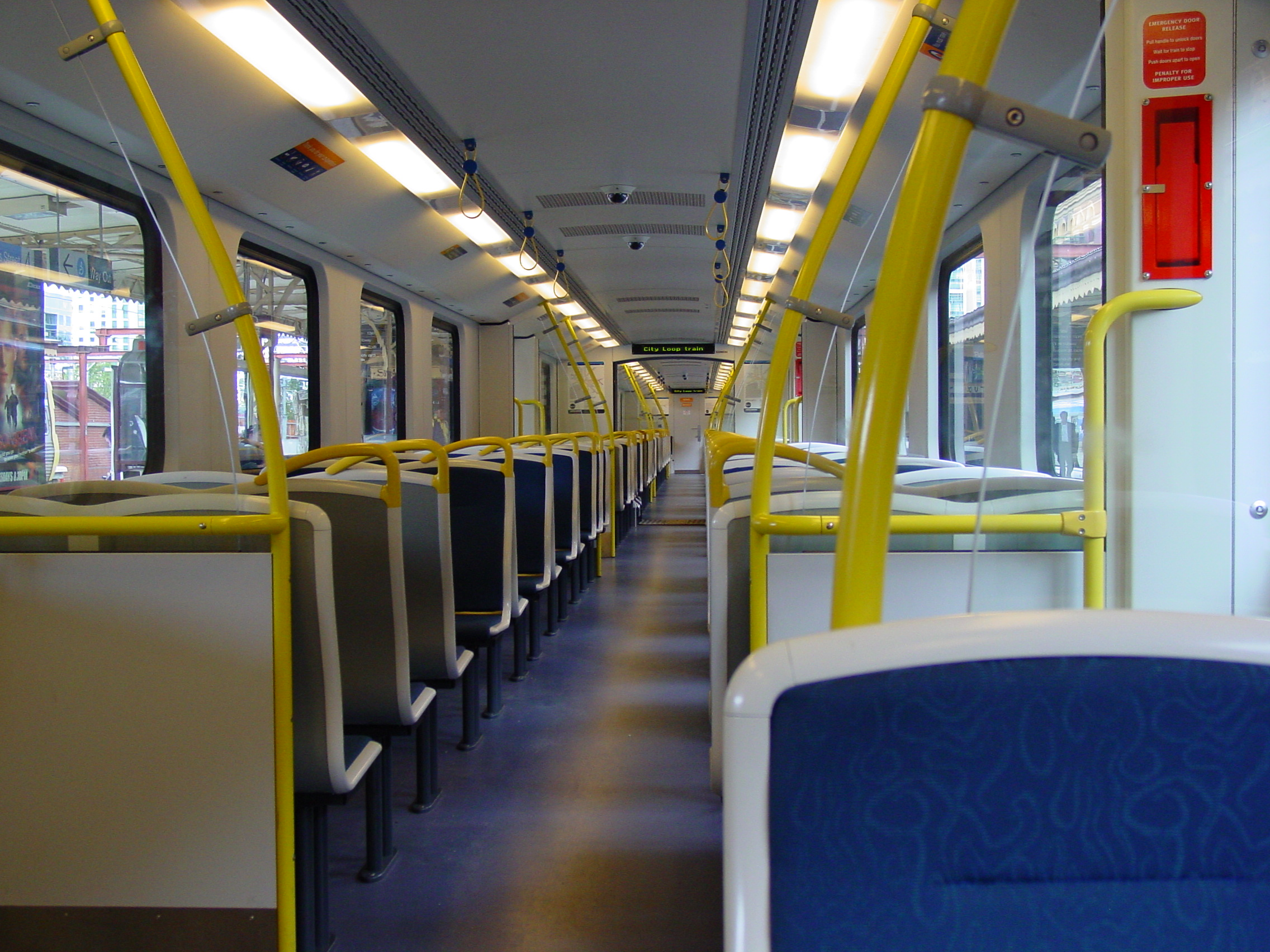
- Interior of the Siemens Nexas for Metro Trains Melbourne
- In service: 1999–present
- Manufacturer: Siemens
- Family name: Modular Metro
- Constructed: 1998–2020
- Successor: Inspiro
- Formation: 2–8 car sets

Specifications
- Electric systems: 750 V DC third rail or 1,500 V DC overhead catenary
- Current collection: Third rail: Contact shoe; OHLE: Pantograph
- Track gauge: 1,435 mm (4 ft 8 1/2 in) (most systems); 1,600 mm (5 ft 3 in) (Metro Trains Melbourne)

The Siemens Modular Metro is a family of electric multiple unit trains for rapid transit systems produced by Siemens Mobility (originally Siemens Transportation Systems) and used by rail operators around the world. The vehicle concept was launched in Vienna in 2000 and is a modular concept allowing many variants of metro vehicles. Previously known as Modular Mobility, Siemens, whose rail equipment division had since been renamed Siemens Mobility, still uses the abbreviation Mo.Mo; however, few of these trains are being built, since Siemens had moved to their Inspiro metro platform in 2013.

== Technology ==
The train is designed for use on systems in the 20,000 to 60,000 passengers/hour range. The design of the train bodies is by Porsche Design. Modules in the system include various vehicle ends, doors, gangways, roof-mounted air-conditioning, and interiors. Many combinations of motor cars and trailers are possible, with individual vehicle lengths from 17 to 25 metres (55 ft 9 in to 82 ft 0 in) and widths from 2.6 to 3.2 metres (8 ft 6 in to 10 ft 6 in). Stainless steel or aluminium construction is available, in three cross sections: straight sidewalls, sidewalls sloping at 3 degrees, and contoured.

== Operators ==
- Guangzhou Metro:120 B1 metro cars for line 3; 126 A1 metro cars for line 1
- Bangkok Transit System Skytrain: 35 4-car sets
- Taipei Metro, Taiwan: 36 C321 and 6 C341 six-car sets for the Bannan Line
- Vienna U-Bahn: designated as Type V, 6-car units
- Shanghai Metro: 28 six-car 04A01 modular trains, 72 additional metro cars of 01A04. First two of 04A01 trains in Vienna, remainder built in China.
- Metro Trains Melbourne: 72 3-car trains locally designated as Siemens Nexas. Use a broad track gauge of 1,600 mm (5 ft 3 in).
- Bangkok Metropolitan Rapid Transit: 19 3-car sets for the Blue Line
- Oslo Metro: 115 3-car units locally designated as MX3000.
- Nuremberg U-Bahn U2 and U3: 30 two-car driverless trains designated as DT3, 36m long, 2.9m wide with an inter-car gangway. 80 seats and room for 240 standing passengers.
- Kaohsiung Metro: 42 3-car sets, with provision to eventually be expanded to 6-car sets
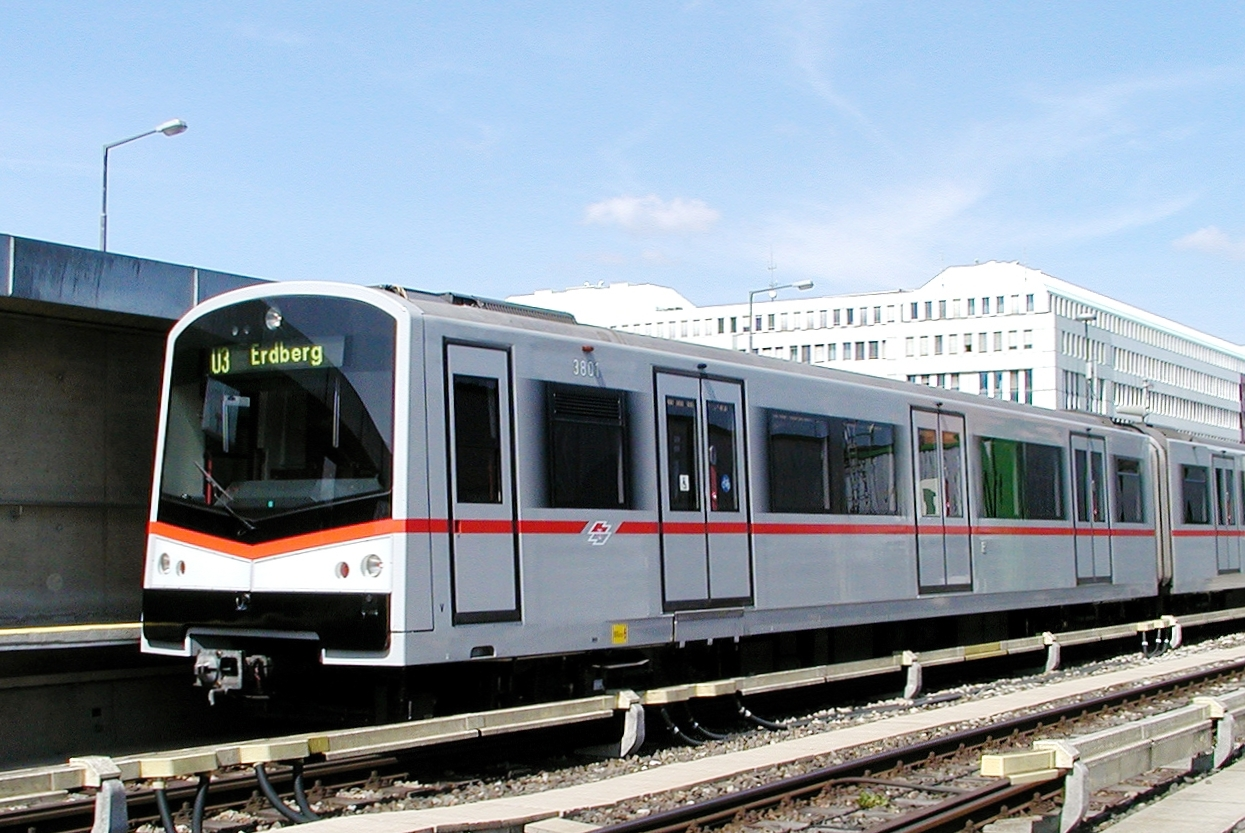
First official Mo.Mo train, the Vienna U-Bahn Type V

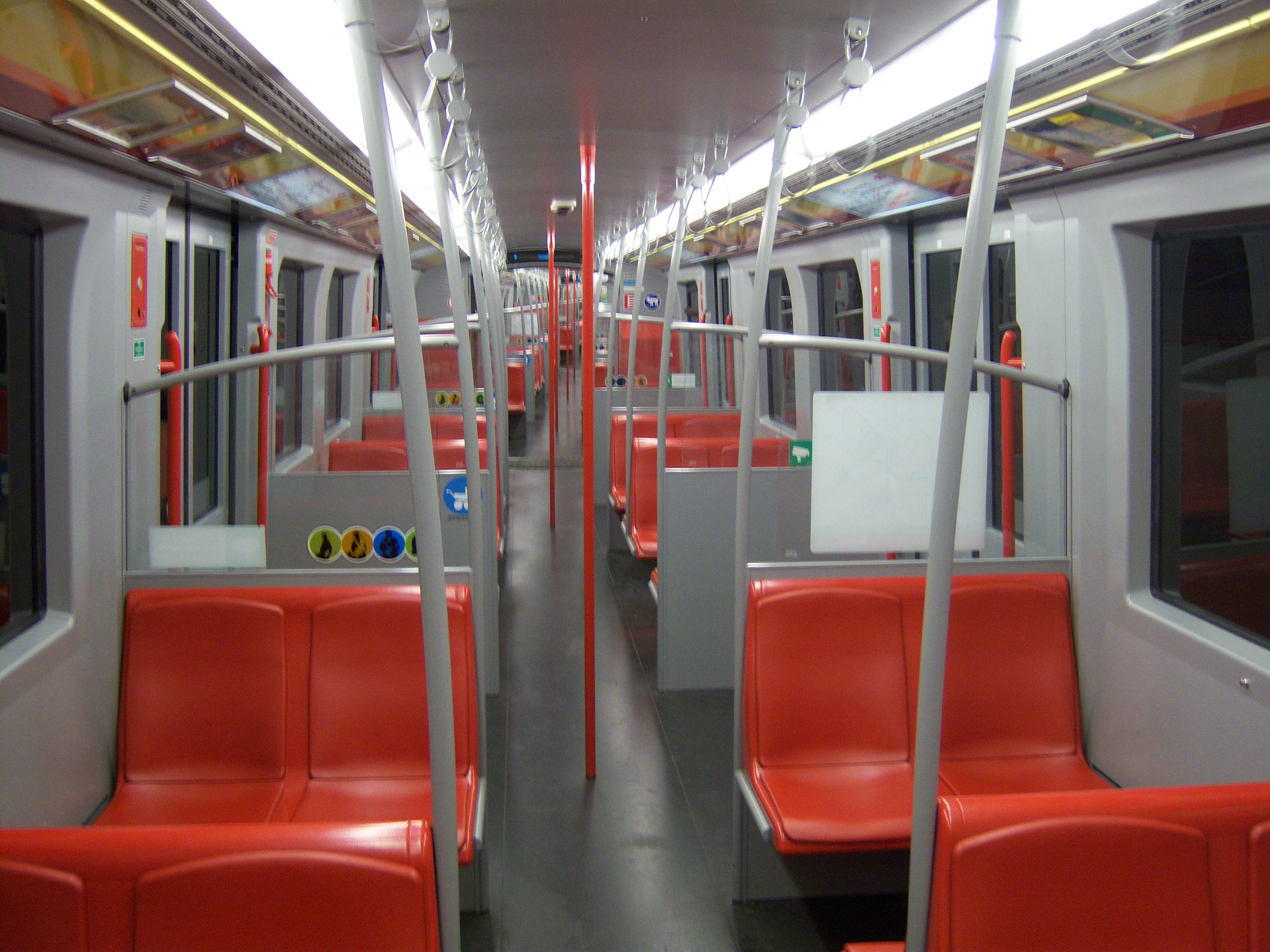
Inside view of Vienna U-Bahn Type V

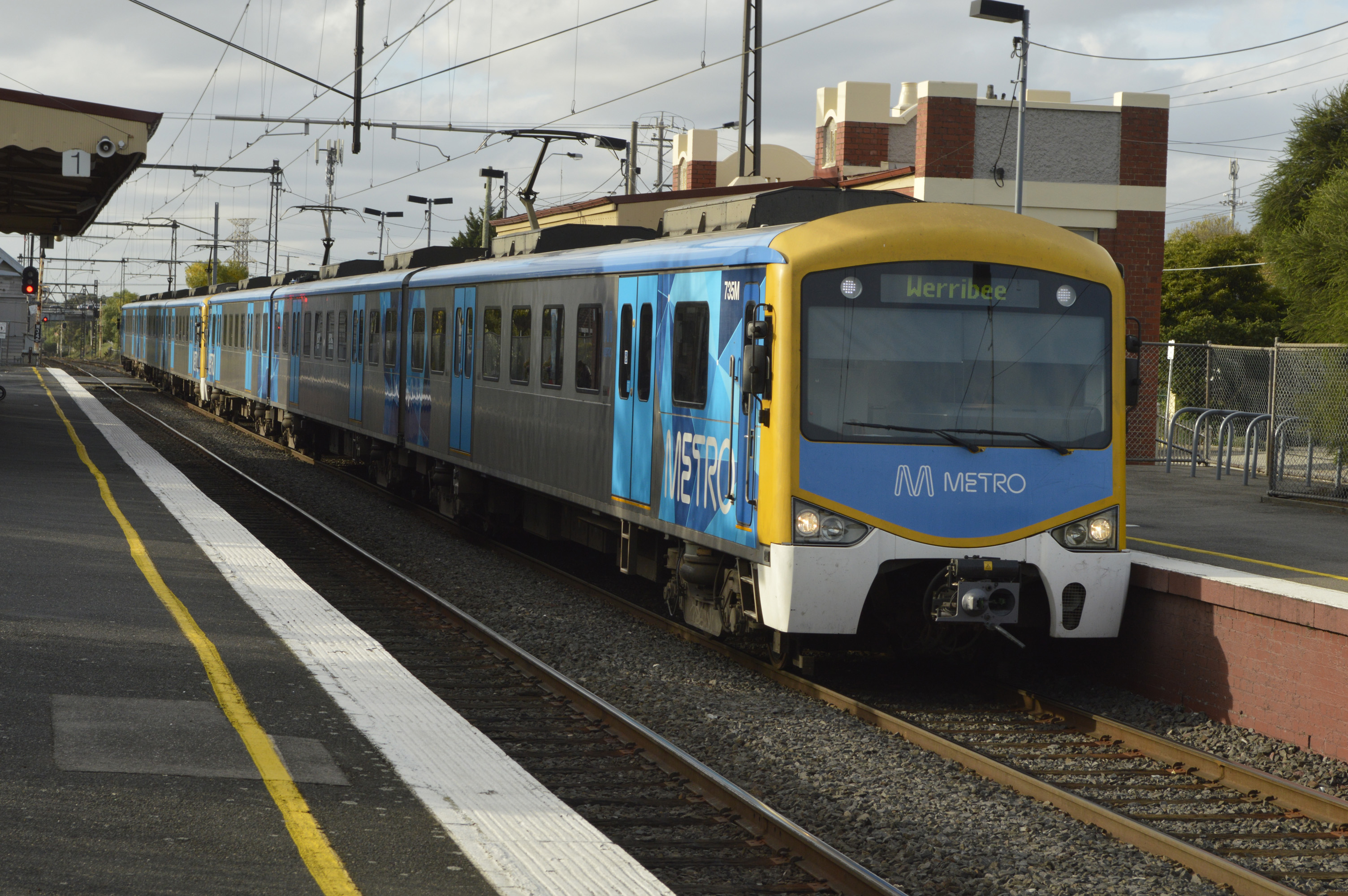
Version of the Siemens Modular Metro (Siemens Nexas) as used on the railways in Melbourne

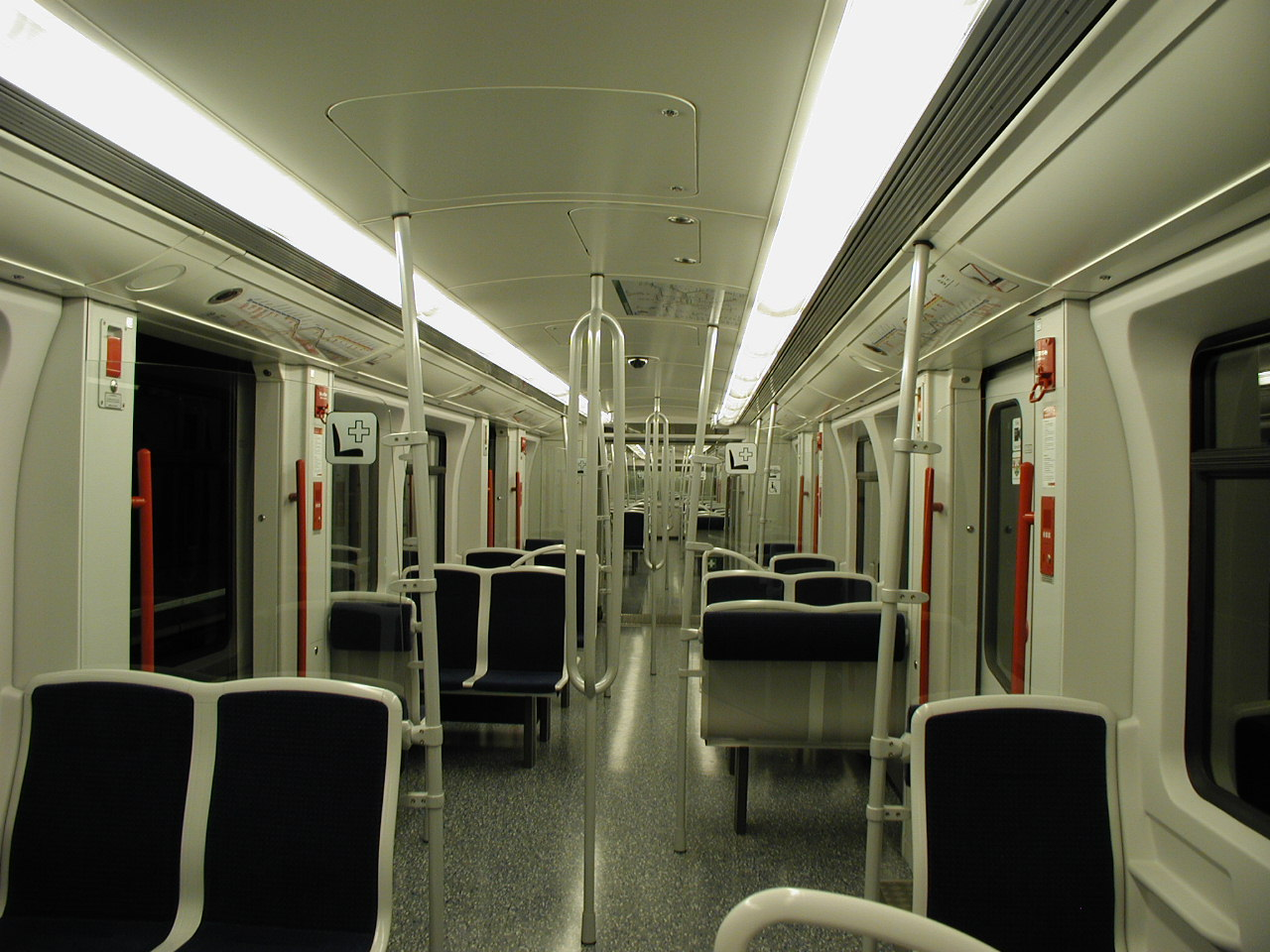
Internal features of the Nuremberg Fully Automatic DT3

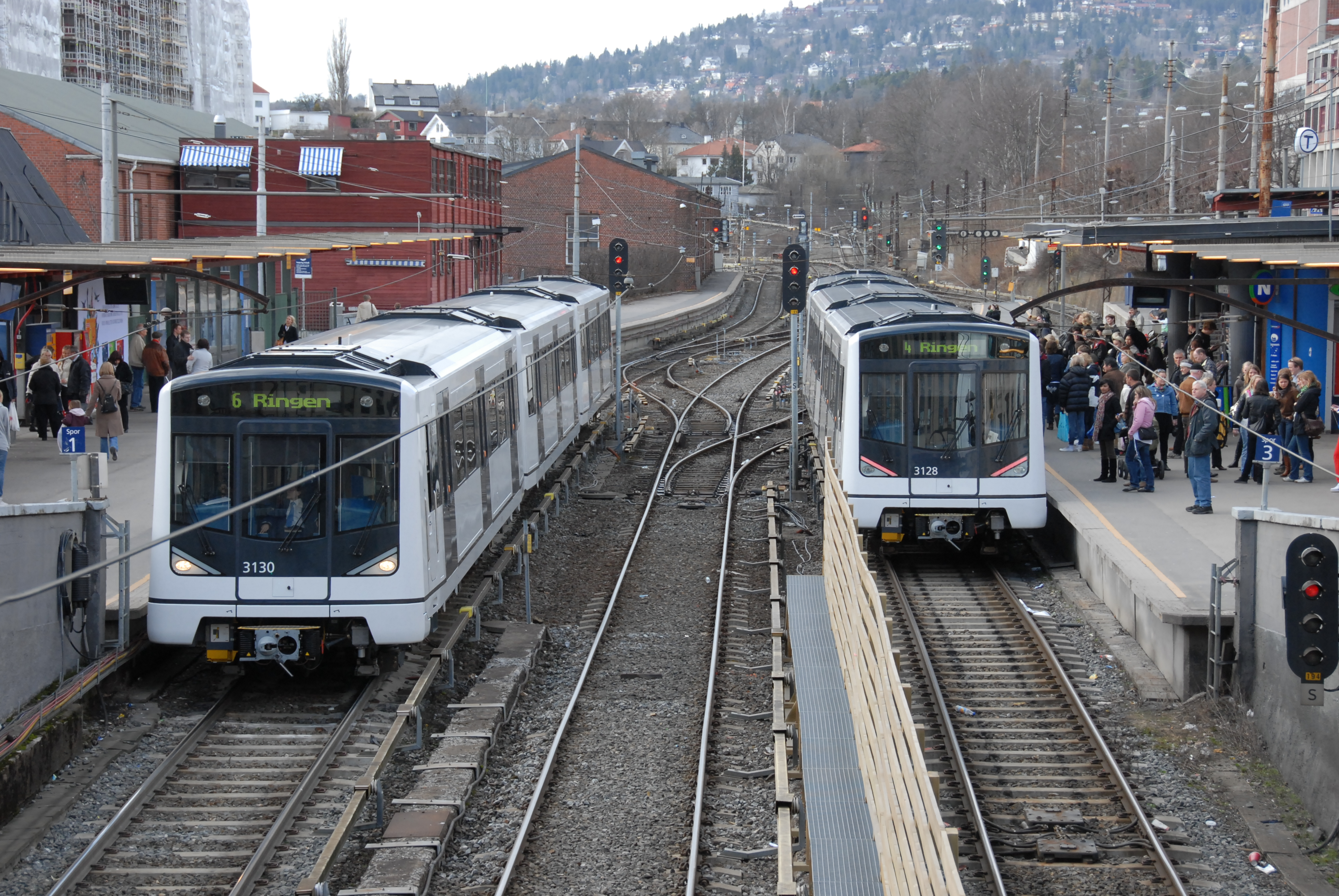
MX3000 trains in Oslo

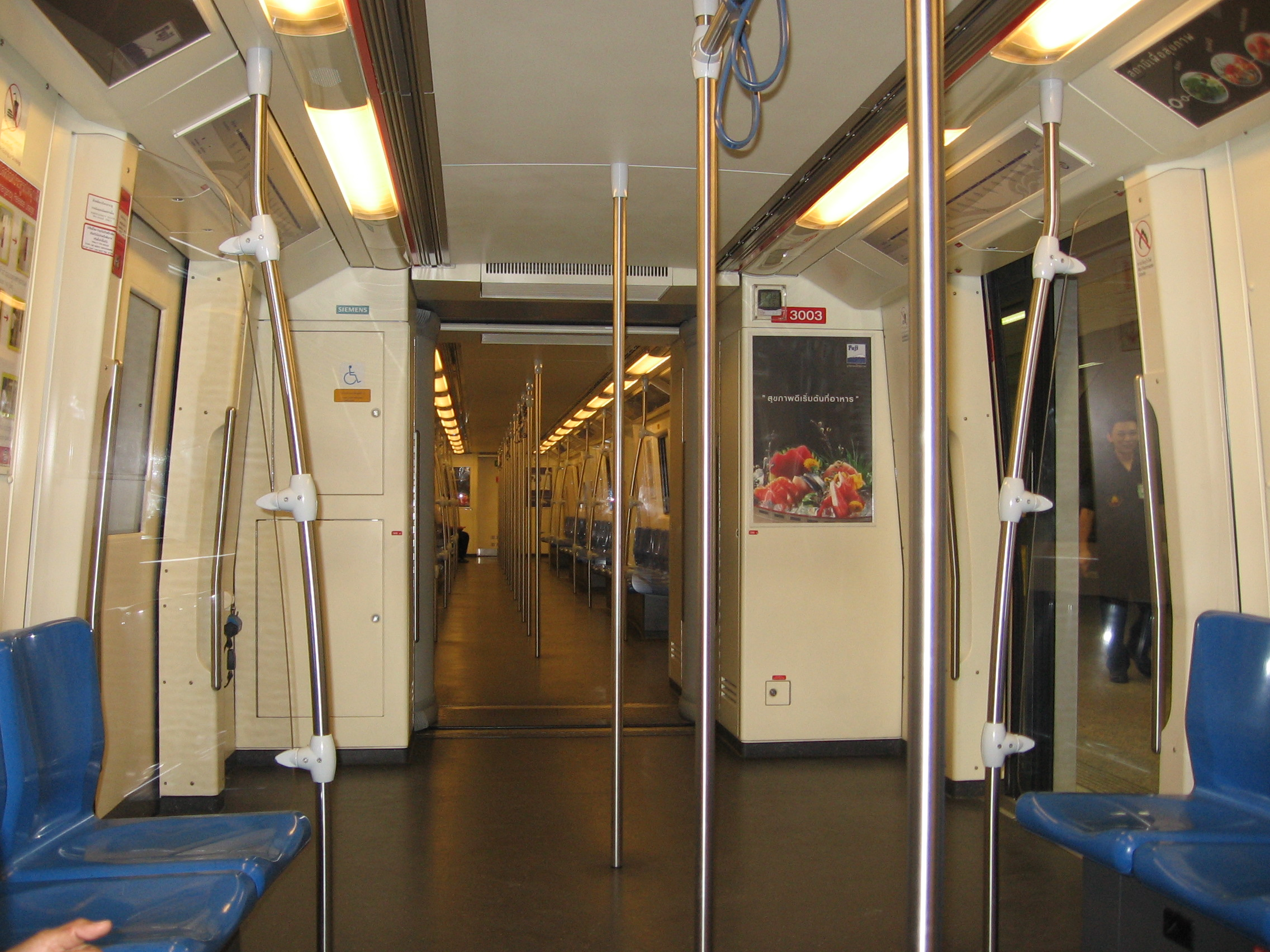
Interior of Mo.Mo train in Bangkok Metro

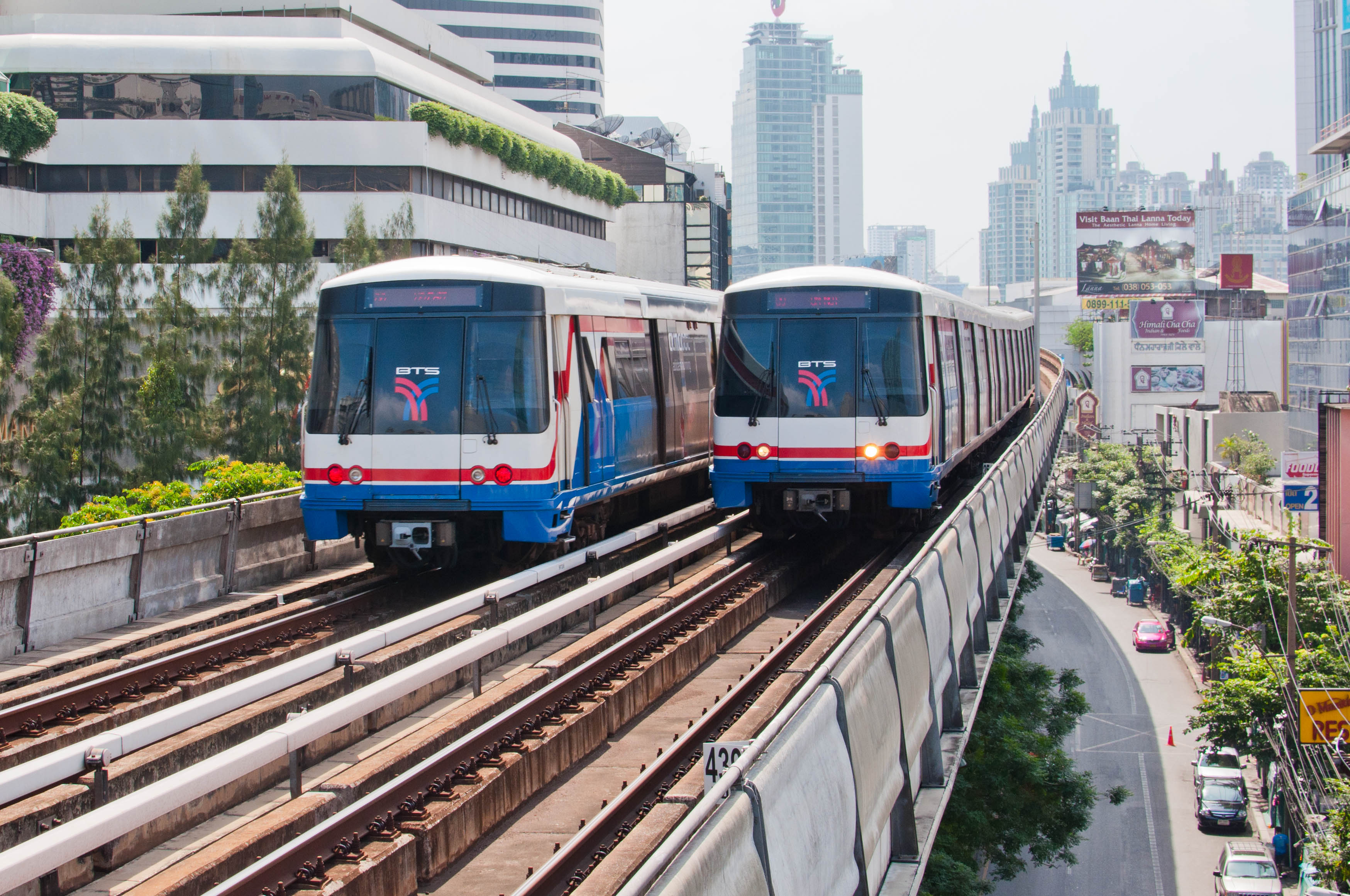
Mo.Mo train in BTS Skytrain Bangkok

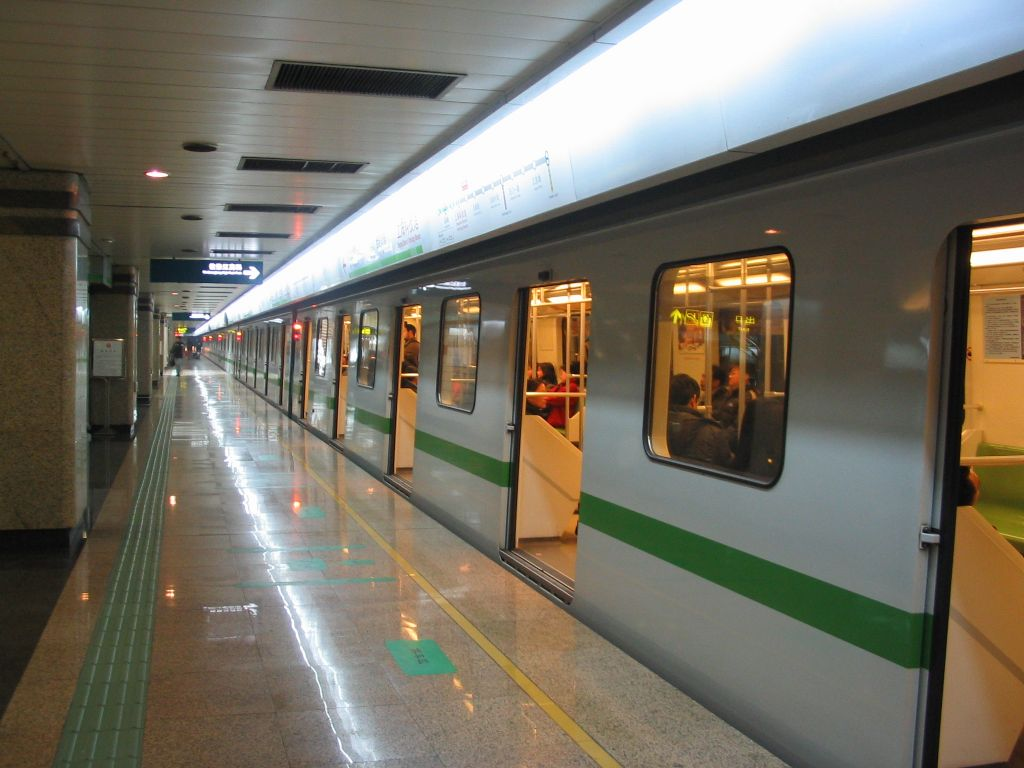
Shanghai Mo.Mo

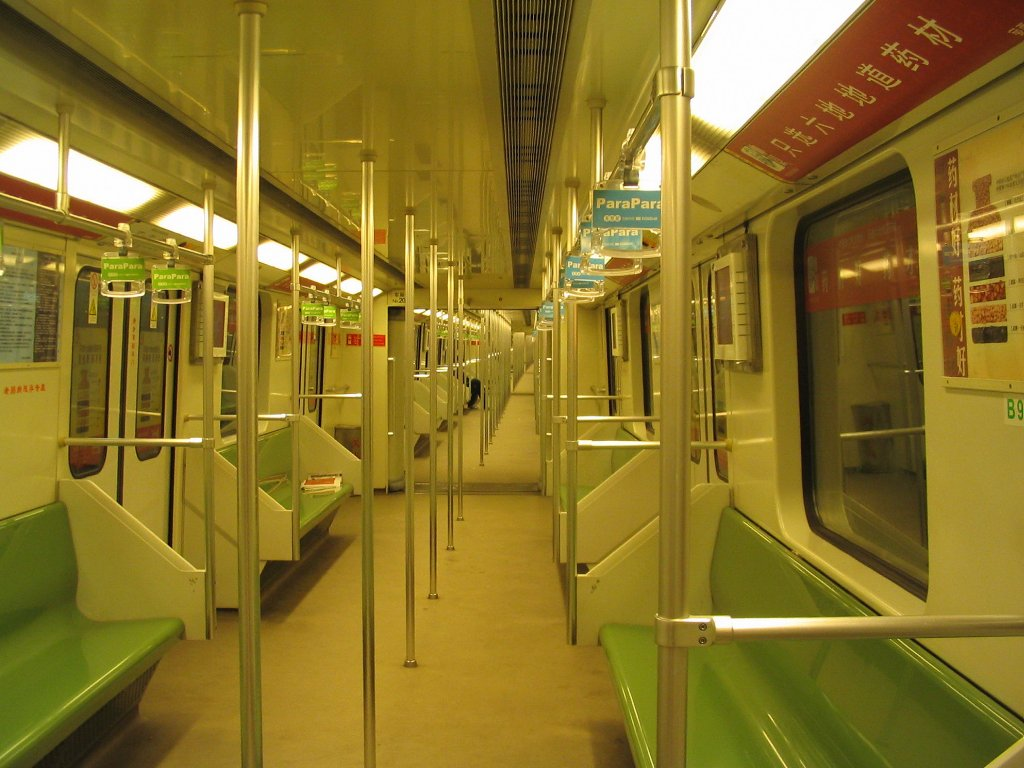
Inside the Shanghai Mo.Mo

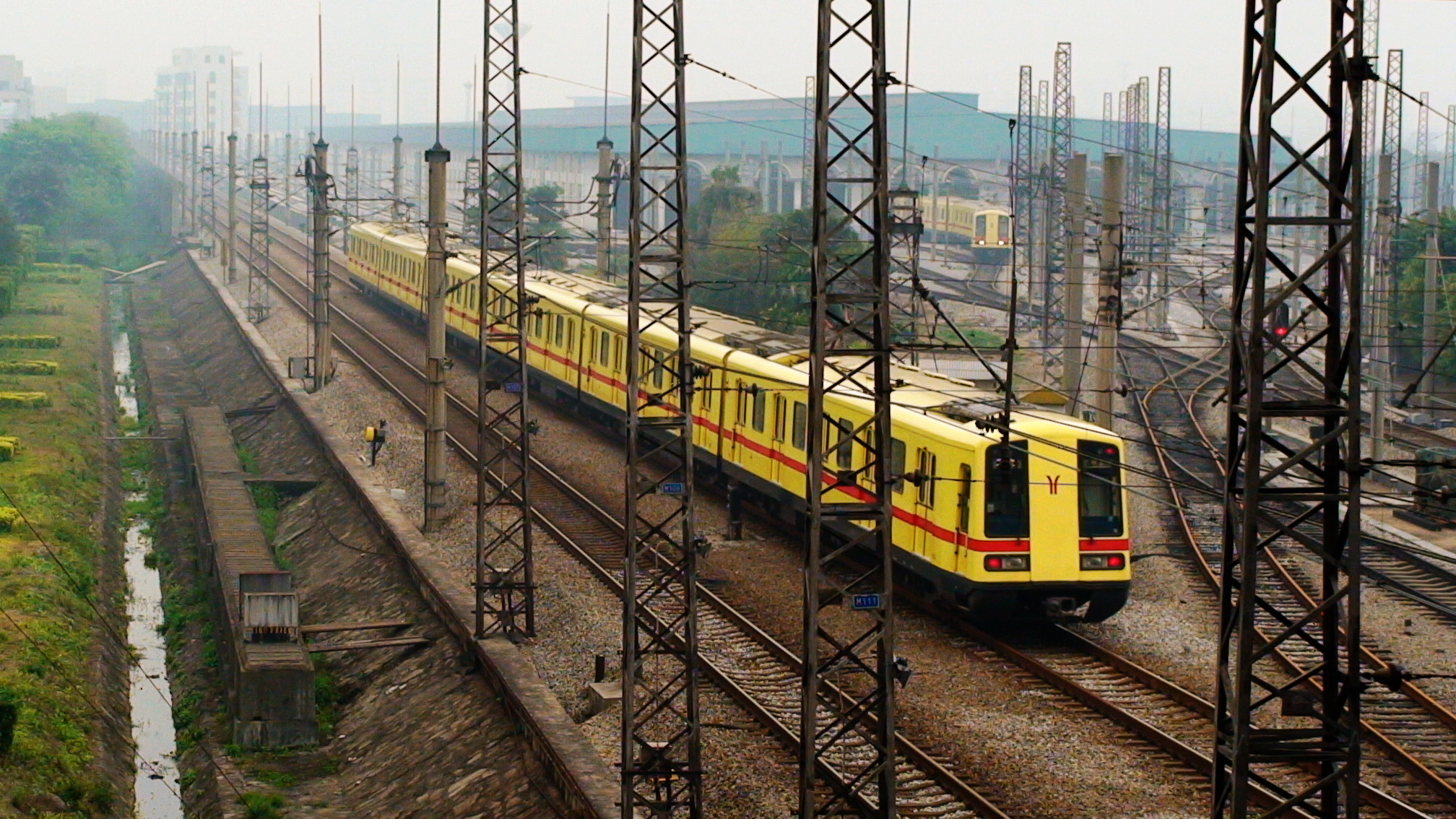
Guangzhou Mo.Mo in Guangzhou Metro line 1

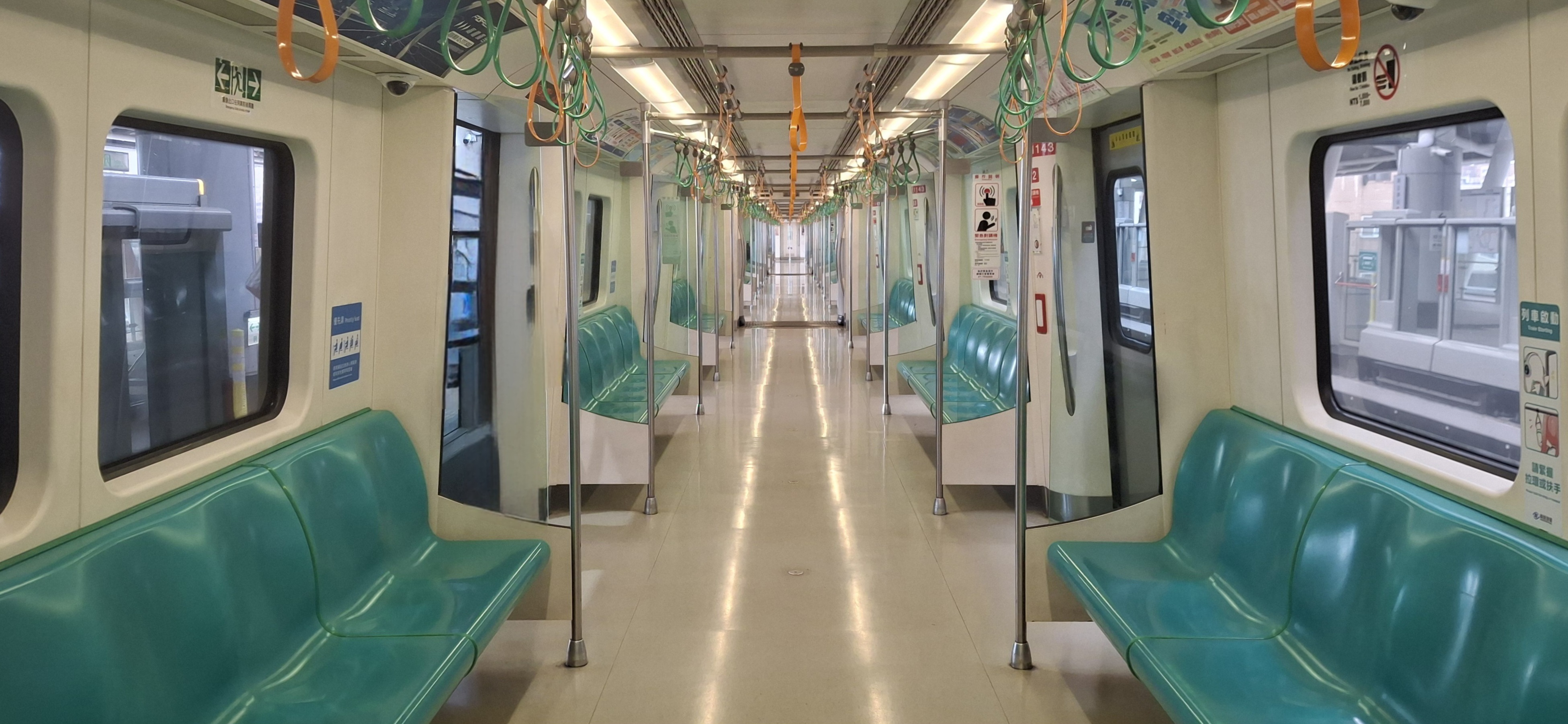
Kaohsiung MRT train

Interior of a Mo.Mo train in Taipei

== Design origins ==
The bodies of the trains evolved from the 1993 DT2 Series used in the Nuremberg U-Bahn whose design in turn came from production of the A Series built for the nearby Munich U-Bahn.

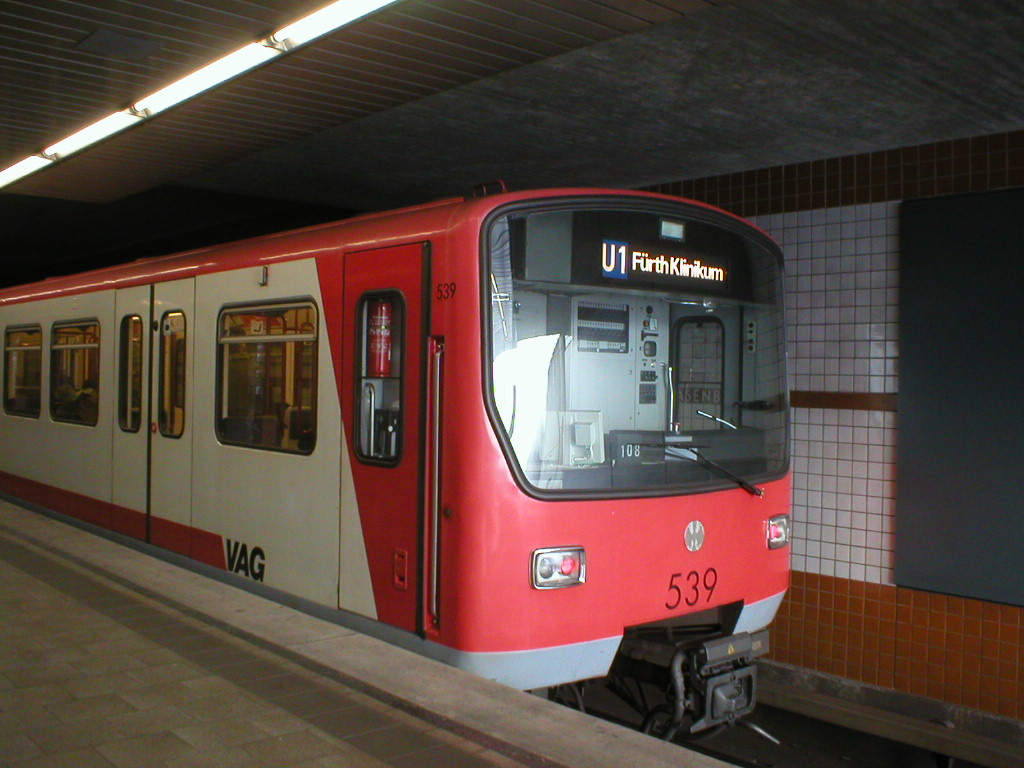
The Nuremberg DT2 from 1993 was a precursor to the Modular Metro designs

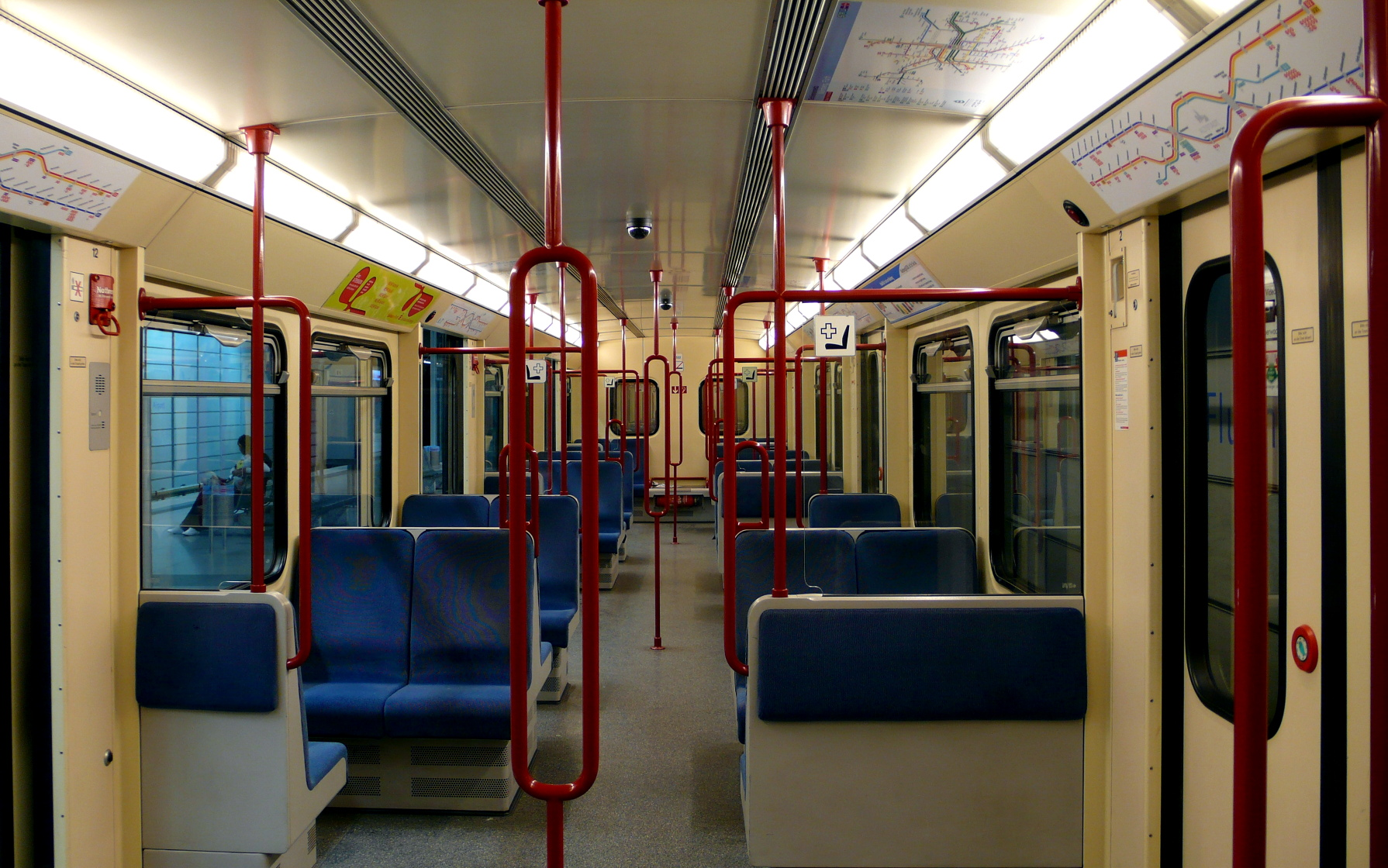
Interior of the DT2

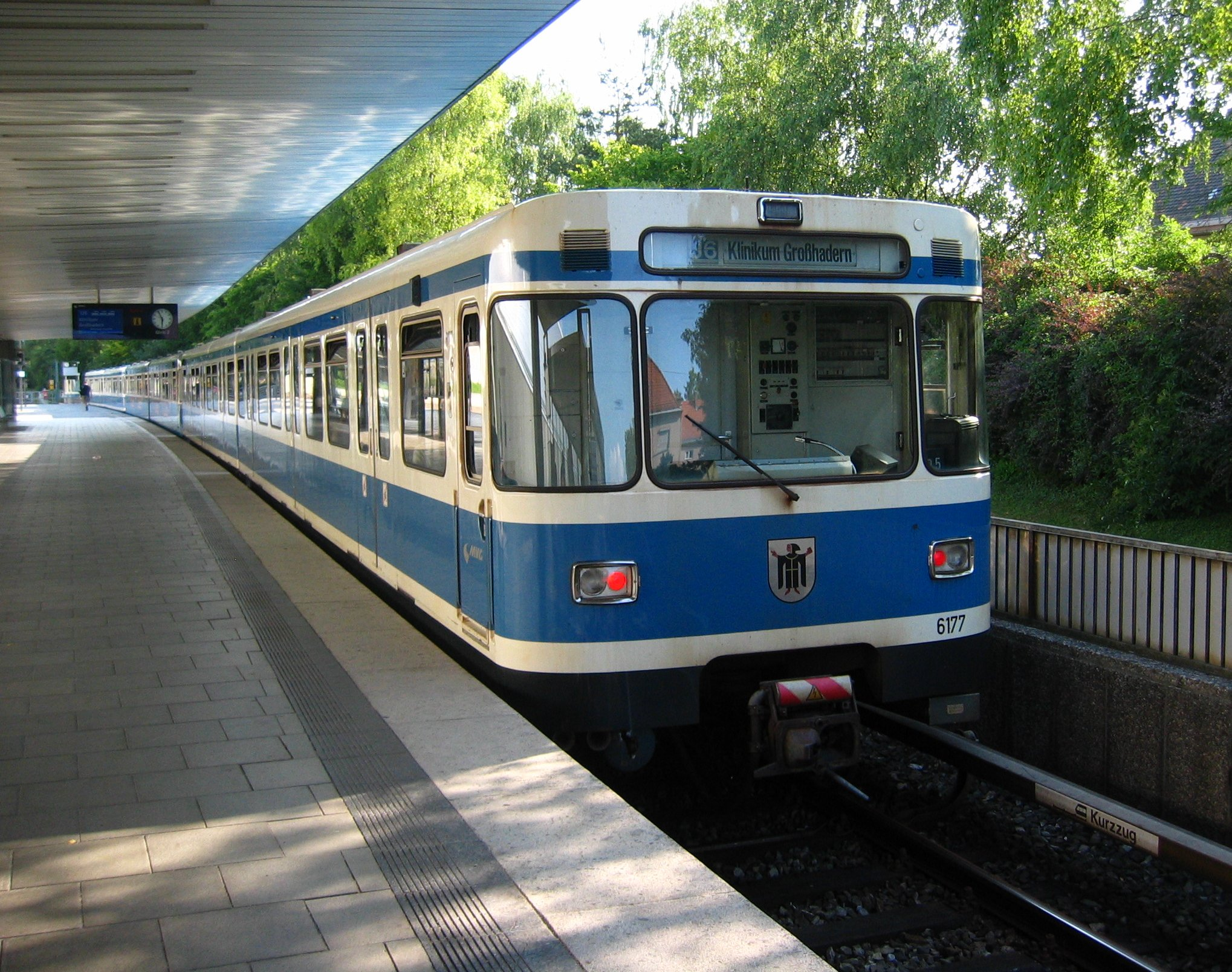
The Munich U-Bahn A Series appeared in 1967, influencing later metro designs

== See also ==
- Alstom Metropolis and Movia
- Siemens Inspiro, the successor to the Modular Metro
