= Huangge station =

Guangzhou Metro station

Coordinates: 22°49′29″N 113°31′08″E

Huangge 黄阁
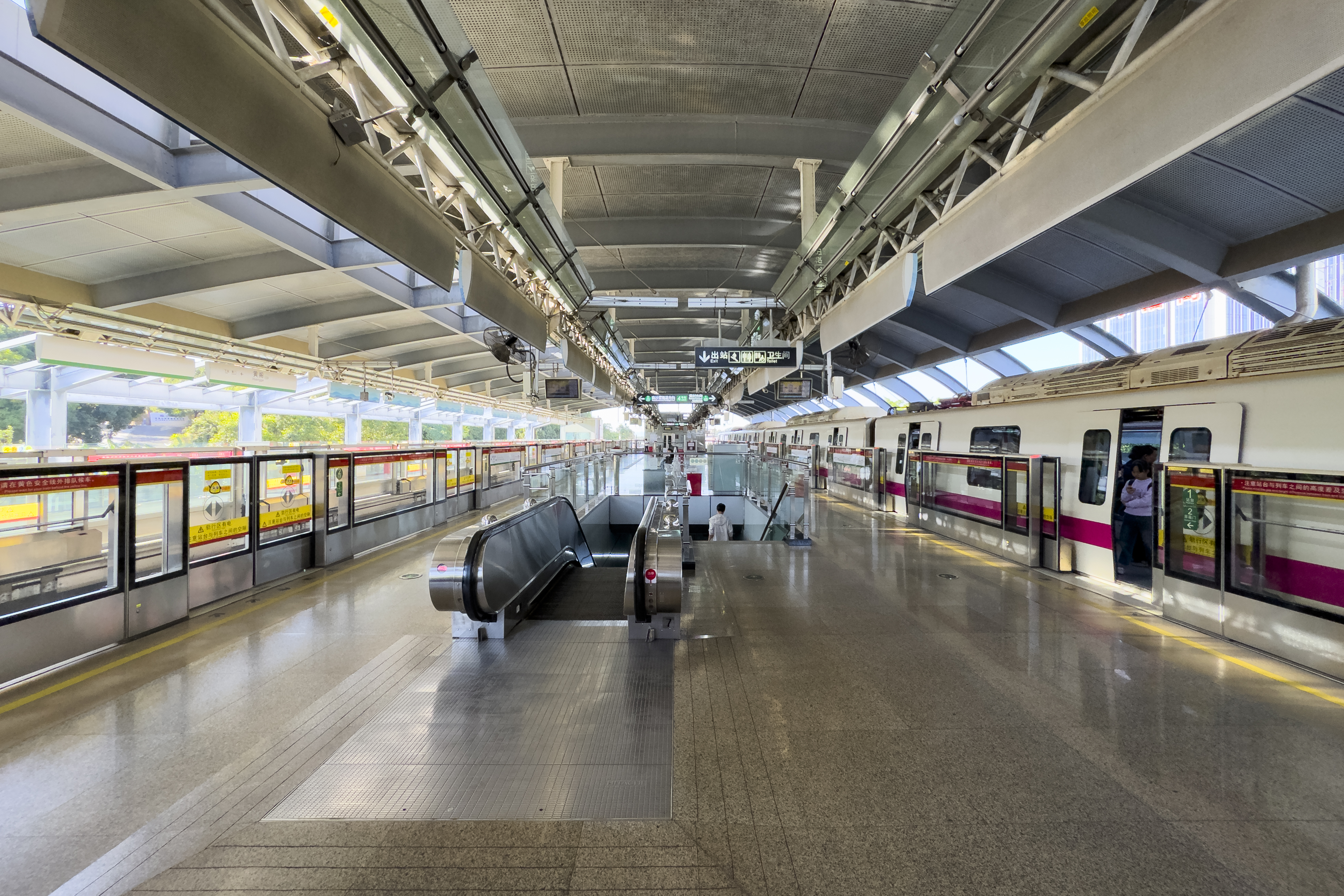

Chinese name
- Simplified Chinese: 黄阁站
- Traditional Chinese: 黃閣站
Transcriptions
Standard Mandarin
- Hanyu Pinyin: Huánggé Zhàn
Yue: Cantonese
- Yale Romanization: Wòhnggok Jaahm
- Jyutping: Wong^{4}gok^{3} Zaam^{6}
- Hong Kong Romanization: Wong Kok station

General information
- Location: Nansha District, Guangzhou, Guangdong; China
- Operated by: Guangzhou Metro Co. Ltd.
- Line: Line 4
- Platforms: 3 (1 island platform 2 side platforms)

Construction
- Structure type: Elevated

Other information
- Station code: 409

History
- Opened: 30 December 2006; 19 years ago

Services
Preceding station	Guangzhou Metro	Following station
Huangge Auto Town towards Huangcun	Line 4	Jiaomen towards Nansha Passenger Port
Location

Huangge Station (simplified Chinese: 黄阁站; traditional Chinese: 黃閣站; Cantonese Yale: Wòhnggok Jaahm) is an elevated station of Line 4 of the Guangzhou Metro. It started operations on 30 December 2006. It is located at the junction of Huangge Avenue and Shinan Road in the town of Huangge, Nansha District.

It was the terminus of Line 4 before the line was extended south to Jinzhou on 28 June 2007.

== Station layout ==
F3; Platforms	Platform 1	4 towards Huangcun (Huangge Auto Town)
F3; Platforms	Island platform, doors will open on the left
F3; Platforms	Platform 2 ↑ Platform 3 ↓	4 towards Nansha Passenger Port (Jiaomen)
F3; Platforms	Side platform, no regular service
F2; Concourse	Lobby	Customer Service, Vending machines, ATMs, Toilet
G Equipment Area	-	Exit and Station equipment

== Exits ==
Exit number	Exit location
Exit A	Shinan Lu
