= Huangge Auto Town station =

Guangzhou Metro station

Coordinates: 22°50′08″N 113°30′33″E

Huangge Auto Town 黄阁汽车城
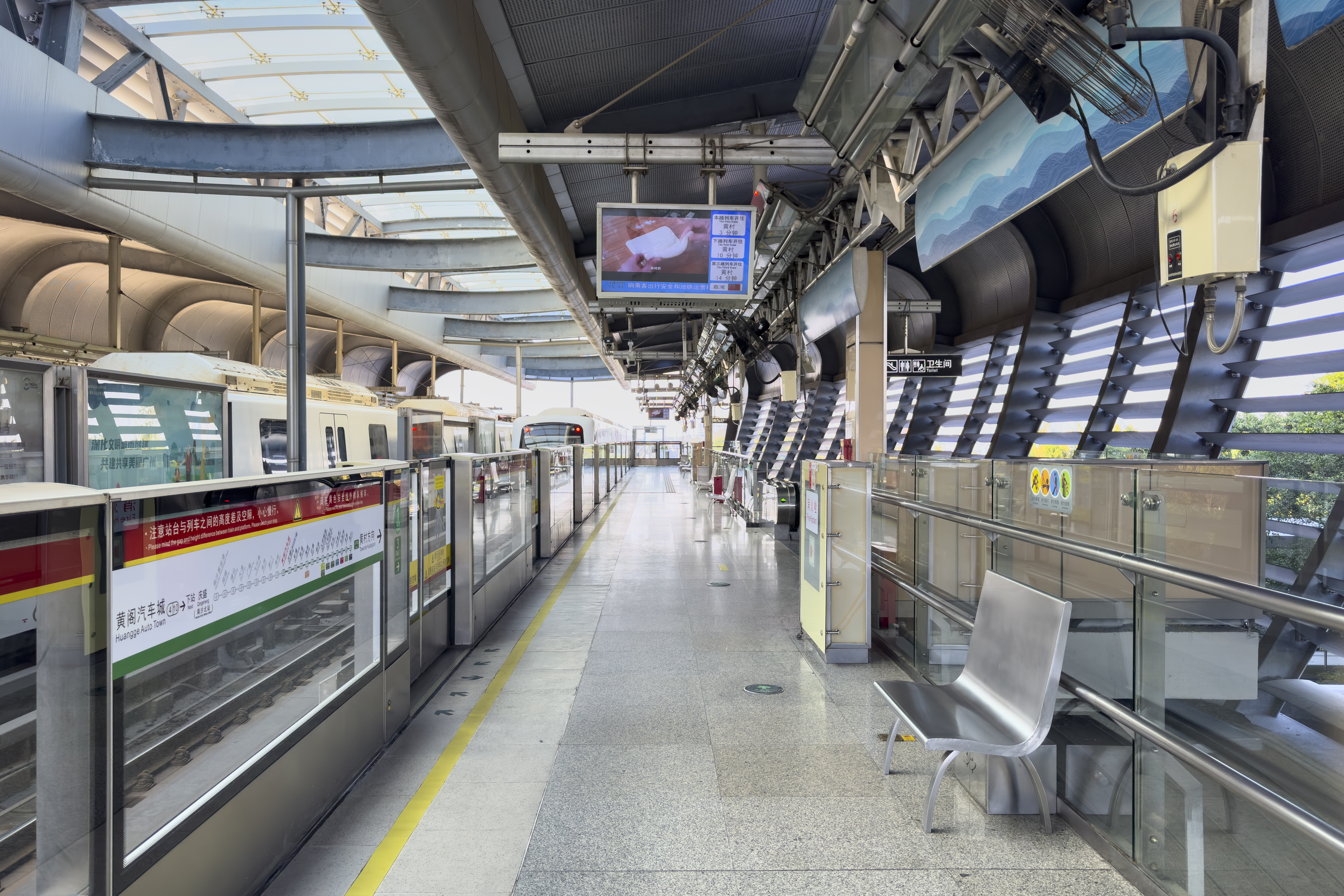

Chinese name
- Simplified Chinese: 黄阁汽车城站
- Traditional Chinese: 黃閣汽車城站
Transcriptions
Standard Mandarin
- Hanyu Pinyin: Huánggé Qìchēchéng Zhàn
Yue: Cantonese
- Yale Romanization: Wòhnggok Heichēsìhng Jaahm
- Jyutping: Wong^{4}gok^{3} Hei^{3}ce^{1}sing^{4} Zaam^{6}
- Hong Kong Romanization: Wong Kok Auto Town station

General information
- Location: Nansha District, Guangzhou, Guangdong; China
- Operated by: Guangzhou Metro Co. Ltd.
- Line: Line 4
- Platforms: 2 (2 side platforms)

Construction
- Structure type: Elevated

Other information
- Station code: 410

History
- Opened: 30 December 2006; 19 years ago

Services
| Preceding station | Guangzhou Metro | Following station |
|---|---|---|
| Qingsheng towards Huangcun | Line 4 | Huangge towards Nansha Passenger Port |
Location

Huangge Auto Town Station (simplified Chinese: 黄阁汽车城站; traditional Chinese: 黃閣汽車城站; Cantonese Yale: Wòhnggok Heichēsìhng Jaahm) is an elevated station of Line 4 of the Guangzhou Metro. It started operations on 30 December 2006. It is located at the junction of Shinan Road and Huangge Road North in the town of Huangge, Nansha District, next to Guangzhou Toyota Auto Town, a plant operated by Toyota.

Before the station put into service, it was called "Huangge North Station" (黄阁北站) and "Guangzhou Toyota Auto Town Station" (广州丰田汽车城站) successively. Residents criticized the station name of "Guangzhou Toyota Auto Town Station" for promoting Toyota and its car accessories. So the station name was changed to the current Huangge Auto Town Station later.

== Station layout ==
| F3; Platforms | Side platform, doors will open on the right |
| F3; Platforms | Platform 2 | 4 towards Nansha Passenger Port (Huangge) |
| F3; Platforms | Platform 1 | 4 towards Huangcun (Qingsheng) |
| F3; Platforms | Side platform, doors will open on the right |
| F2; Concourse | West Lobby | Customer Service, Vending machines, ATMs, Payphones |
| F2; Concourse | Passageways | Pedestrian passageway between West & East Lobbies, Pedestrian overpass |
| F2; Concourse | East Lobby | Customer Service, Vending machines, ATMs, Payphones |
| G | - | Exits |

== Exits ==
| Exit number | Exit location |
|---|---|
| Exit A | Shinan Lu |
| Exit B | Shinan Lu |
