= Jiaomen station =

Guangzhou Metro station

Coordinates: 22°48′02″N 113°31′41″E

Jiaomen 蕉门
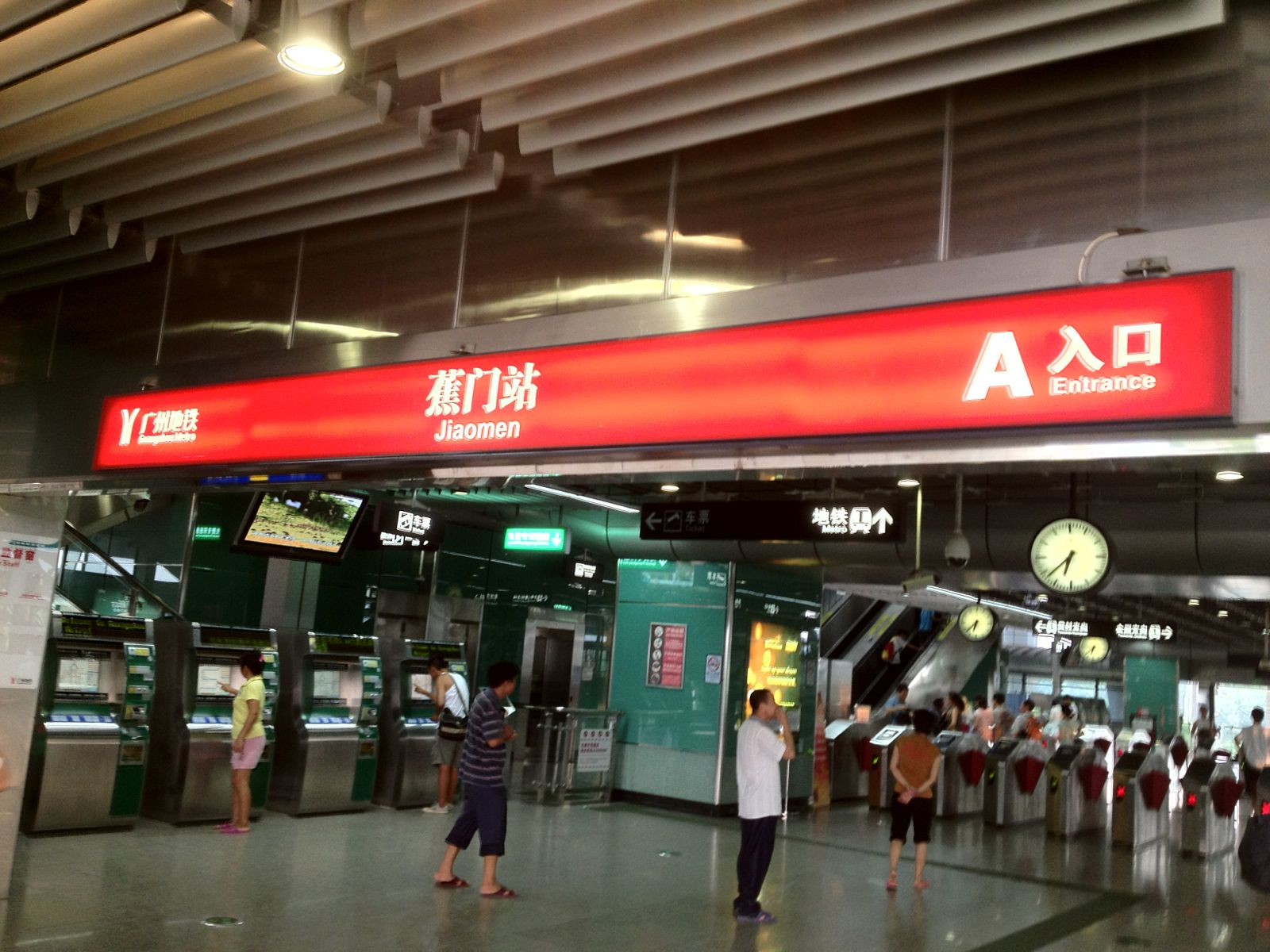

Chinese name
- Simplified Chinese: 蕉门站
- Traditional Chinese: 蕉門站
Transcriptions
Standard Mandarin
- Hanyu Pinyin: Jiāomén Zhàn
Yue: Cantonese
- Yale Romanization: Jīumùhn Jaahm
- Jyutping: Ziu^{1}mun^{4} Zaam^{6}
- Hong Kong Romanization: Tsiu Mun station

General information
- Location: Nansha District, Guangzhou, Guangdong; China
- Operated by: Guangzhou Metro Co. Ltd.
- Line: Line 4
- Platforms: 2 (2 side platforms)

Construction
- Structure type: Elevated

Other information
- Station code: 408

History
- Opened: 28 June 2007; 18 years ago

Services
Preceding station	Guangzhou Metro	Following station
Huangge towards Huangcun	Line 4	Jinzhou towards Nansha Passenger Port
Location

Jiaomen Station (simplified Chinese: 蕉门站; traditional Chinese: 蕉門站; Cantonese Yale: Jīumùhn Jaahm) is an elevated station of Line 4 of the Guangzhou Metro. It started operations on 28 June 2007. It is located at the junction of Nansha Avenue and Fenghuang Avenue in the town of Huangge, Nansha District.

== Station layout ==
F3; Platforms	Side platform, doors will open on the right
F3; Platforms	Platform 2	4 towards Nansha Passenger Port (Jinzhou)
F3; Platforms	Platform 1	4 towards Huangcun (Huangge)
F3; Platforms	Side platform, doors will open on the right
F2; Concourse	Lobby	Customer Service, Vending machines, ATMs, Payphones
G Equipment Area	-	Exits, Toilets and Station equipment

== Exits ==
Exit number	Exit location
Exit A	Fenghuang Dadao
Exit B	Fenghuang Dadao
