= Nansha North railway station =

Railway and metro station in Nansha District, Guangzhou

Coordinates: 22°52′01″N 113°29′26″E

Nanshabei 南沙北
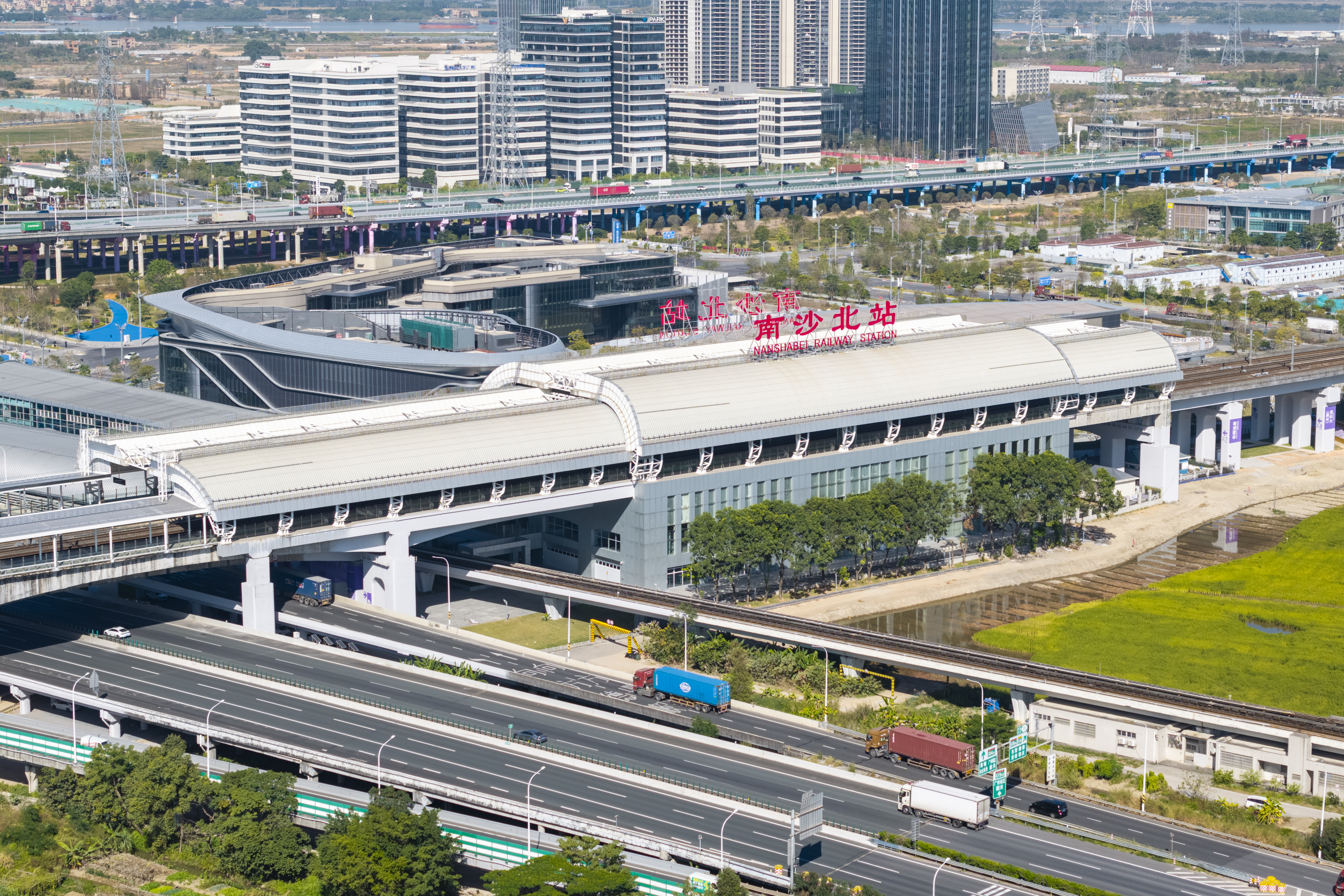
- Station building

Chinese name
- Simplified Chinese: 南沙北站
- Traditional Chinese: 南沙北站
Transcriptions
Standard Mandarin
- Hanyu Pinyin: Nánshā běi zhàn
Yue: Cantonese
- Yale Romanization: Nàahmsā Jaahm
- Jyutping: Naam^{4}saa^{1} Zaam^{6}

General information
- Location: Qingsheng, Dongchong, Nansha District, Guangzhou, Guangdong; China
- Lines: Guangzhou–Shenzhen–Hong Kong XRL; Line 4
- Platforms: China High Speed Railway: 2 side platforms Guangzhou Metro: 2 side platforms
- Tracks: CRH: 4 (2 nonstop); Guangzhou Metro: 2

Other information
- Station code: China Railway: TMIS: 65851; Telegraph: QSQ; Pinyin: NSB; Metro: 411
- Classification: 3rd class station (China Railway)

History
- Opened: 26 December 2011; 14 years ago 28 December 2017; 8 years ago

Services
Preceding station	Guangzhou Metro	Following station
Dongchong towards Huangcun	Line 4	Huangge Auto Town towards Nansha Passenger Port
Location

Nansha North railway station (Chinese: 南沙北站) is a station located in Qingsheng Village (庆盛村), Dongchong Town, Nansha District, Guangzhou. It is one of the stations on the Guangzhou–Shenzhen–Hong Kong Express Rail Link between Guangzhou South railway station in Panyu District, Guangzhou and Futian railway station in Futian District, Shenzhen.

It was formerly named Qingsheng railway station (simplified Chinese: 庆盛站; traditional Chinese: 慶盛站; Cantonese Yale: Hingsihng Jaahm) until 11 October 2025, when it was renamed "Nansha North railway station" to recongnize its location in Nansha District, Guangzhou.

== Guangzhou Metro ==
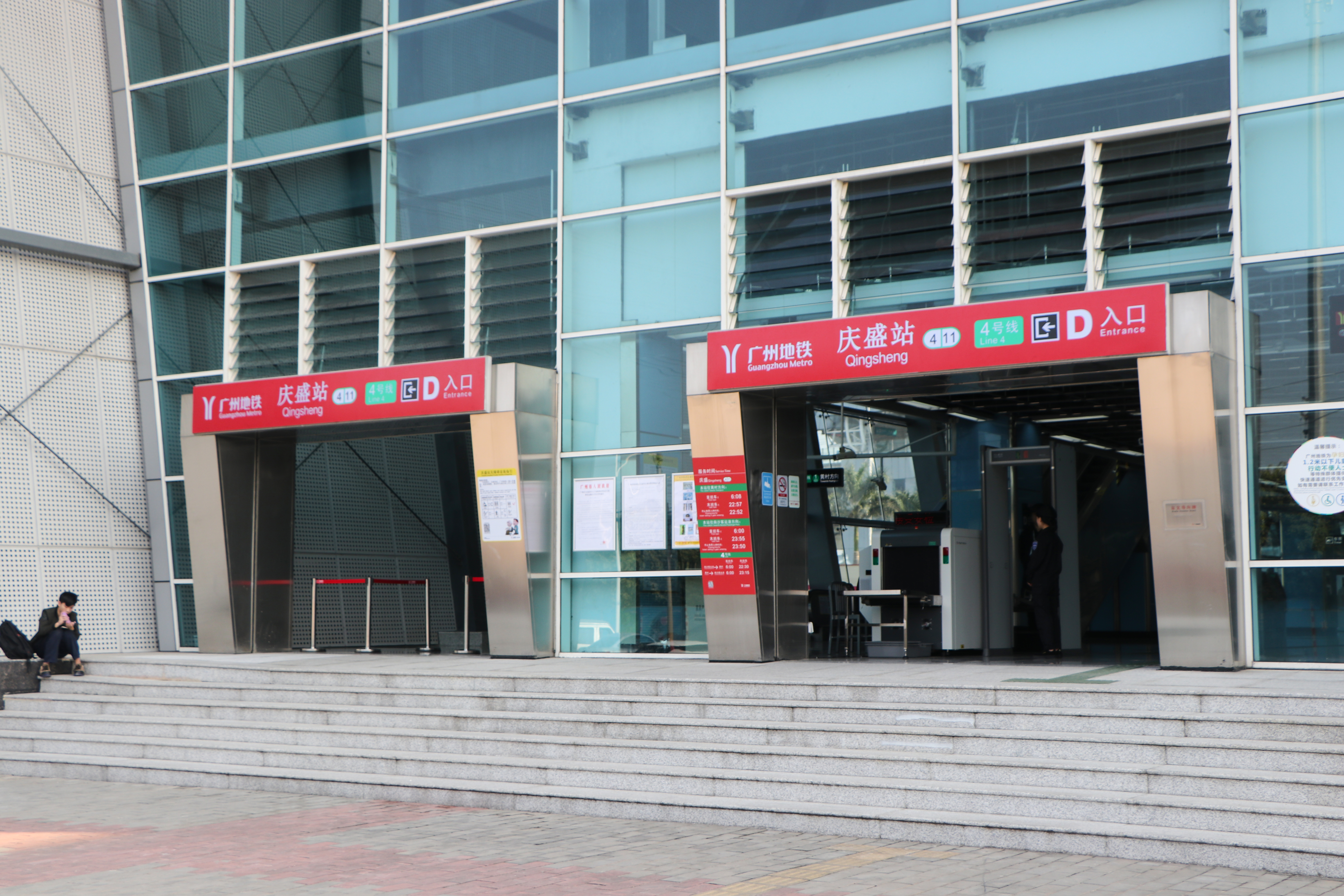
Exit D of the Guangzhou Metro station

An elevated metro station on Line 4 of the Guangzhou Metro, which remains named Qingsheng station, started operation on 28 December 2017.

== Services ==
=== China Railway ===
- Guangzhou–Shenzhen–Hong Kong Express Rail Link

=== Guangzhou Metro ===
- Line 4

Preceding station	China Railway High-speed	Following station
Guangzhou South towards Beijing West	Beijing–Guangzhou–Shenzhen–Hong Kong high-speed railway	Humen towards Hong Kong West Kowloon
Preceding station	Guangzhou Metro	Following station
Dongchong towards Huangcun	Line 4	Huangge Auto Town towards Nansha Passenger Port
