= Dachong station =

Guangzhou Metro station

Coordinates: 22°45′33″N 113°33′22″E

Dachong 大涌
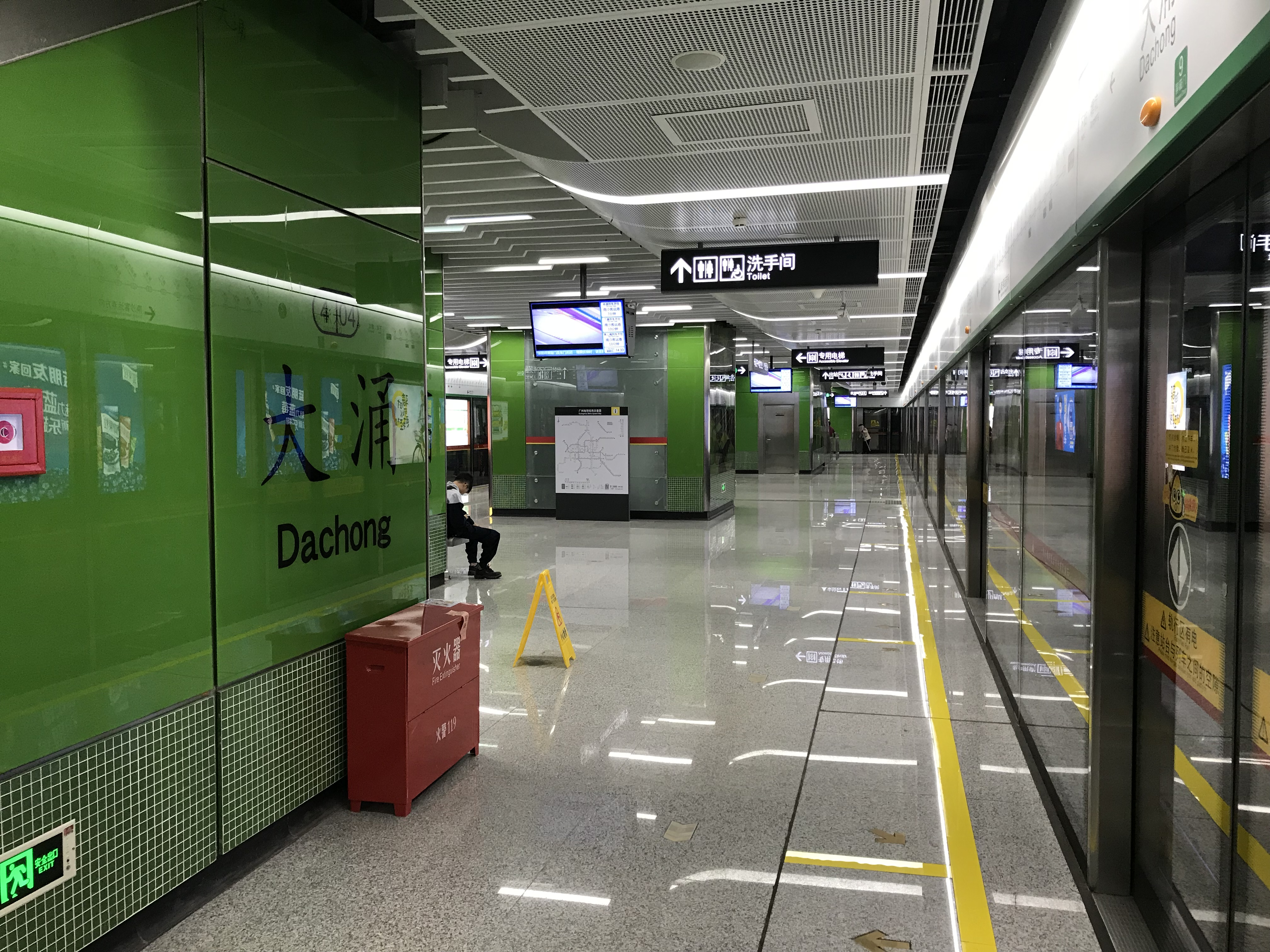

Chinese name
- Chinese: 大涌站
- Literal meaning: Big River Station
Transcriptions
Standard Mandarin
- Hanyu Pinyin: Dàchōng Zhàn
Yue: Cantonese
- Yale Romanization: Daaihchūng Jaahm
- Jyutping: Daai^{6}cung^{1} Zaam^{6}
- Hong Kong Romanization: Tai Chung station

General information
- Location: Huanshi Avenue West (环市大道西) and East Dachong Road (大涌东路); Nansha, Guangzhou, Guangdong; China
- Operator: Guangzhou Metro Co. Ltd.
- Line: Line 4

Construction
- Structure type: Underground

Other information
- Station code: 404

History
- Opened: 28 December 2017; 8 years ago

Services
Preceding station	Guangzhou Metro	Following station
Guanglong towards Huangcun	Line 4	Tangkeng towards Nansha Passenger Port
Location

Dachong station (Chinese: 大涌站; Cantonese Yale: Daaihchūng Jaahm) is a station on Line 4 of the Guangzhou Metro. It started operation on 28 December 2017.

== Station layout ==
G	-	Exit
L1; Concourse	Lobby	Customer Service, Shops, Vending machines, ATMs
L2; Platforms	Platform 2	4 towards Nansha Passenger Port (Tangkeng)
L2; Platforms	Island platform, doors will open on the left
L2; Platforms	Platform 1	4 towards Huangcun (Guanglong)

== Exits ==
Exit number	Exit location
Exit A	Gongye Silu
Exit B	Huanshi Dadaoxi
Exit D	Dachong Donglu
