= Feishajiao station =

Guangzhou Metro station

Coordinates: 22°46′55″N 113°32′27″E

Feishajiao 飞沙角
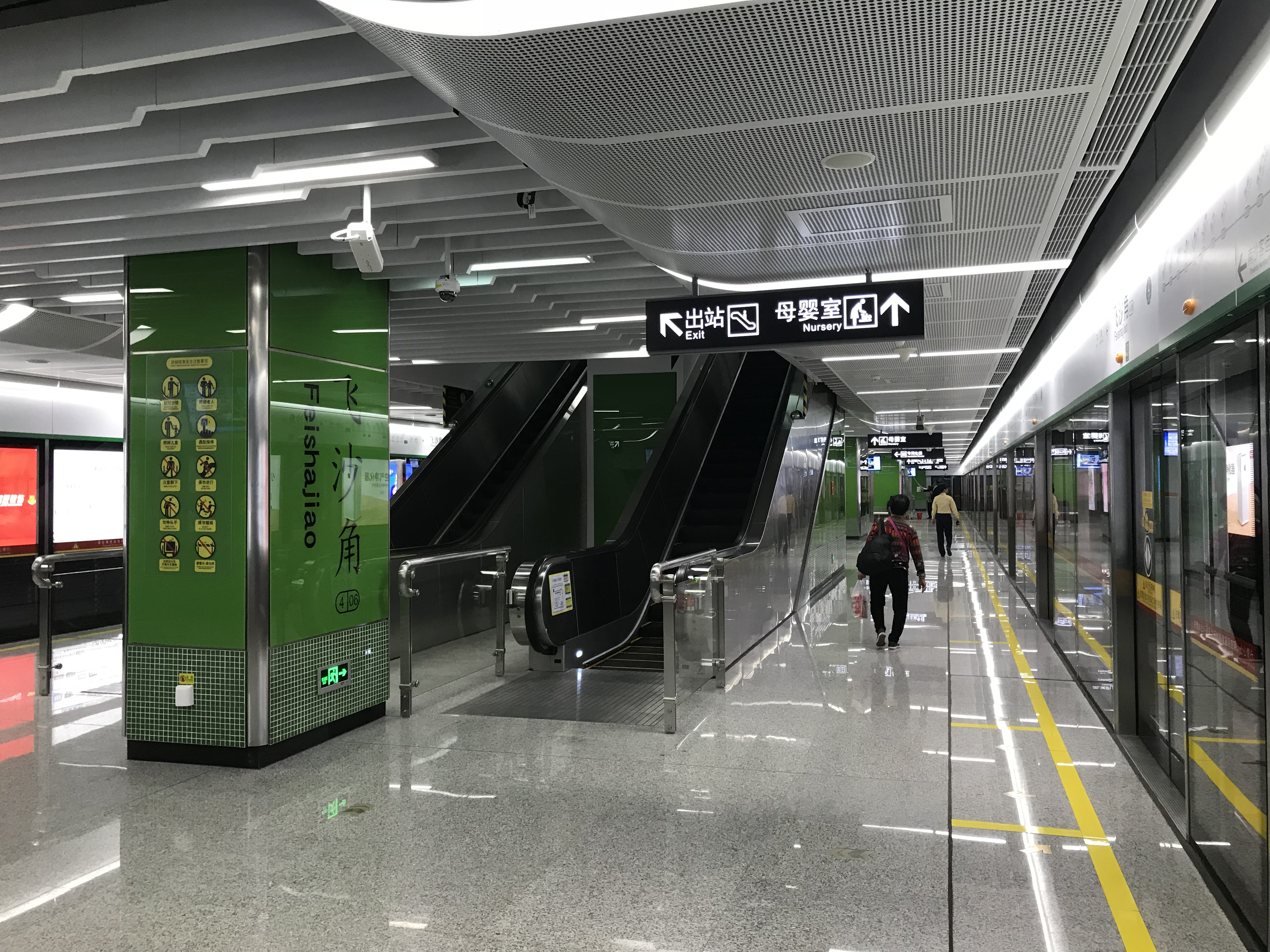

Chinese name
- Simplified Chinese: 飞沙角站
- Traditional Chinese: 飛沙角站
Transcriptions
Standard Mandarin
- Hanyu Pinyin: Fēishājiǎo Zhàn
Yue: Cantonese
- Yale Romanization: Fēisāgok Jaahm
- Jyutping: Fei^{1}saa^{1}gok^{3} Zaam^{6}
- Hong Kong Romanization: Fei Sha Kok station

General information
- Location: Jinlong Road (金隆路) north of the Dachong Bridge (大涌桥) on the Jingzhu Expressway; Nansha District, Guangzhou, Guangdong; China
- Operator: Guangzhou Metro Co. Ltd.
- Line: Line 4

Construction
- Structure type: Underground

Other information
- Station code: 406

History
- Opened: 28 December 2017; 8 years ago

Services
| Preceding station | Guangzhou Metro | Following station |
|---|---|---|
| Jinzhou towards Huangcun | Line 4 | Guanglong towards Nansha Passenger Port |
Location

Feishajiao station (simplified Chinese: 飞沙角站; traditional Chinese: 飛沙角站; Cantonese Yale: Fēisāgok Jaahm) is a station of Line 4 of the Guangzhou Metro. It started operations on 28 December 2017.

== Station layout ==
| G | - | Exit |
| L1; Concourse | Lobby | Customer Service, Shops, Vending machines, ATMs |
| L2; Platforms | Platform 2 | 4 towards Nansha Passenger Port (Guanglong) |
| L2; Platforms | Island platform, doors will open on the left |
| L2; Platforms | Platform 1 | 4 towards Huangcun (Jinzhou) |

== Exits ==
| Exit number | Exit location |
|---|---|
| Exit A | Jinlong Lu |
| Exit B | Jinlong Lu |
