= Guanglong station =

Guangzhou Metro station

Coordinates: 22°46′20″N 113°32′27″E

Guanglong 广隆
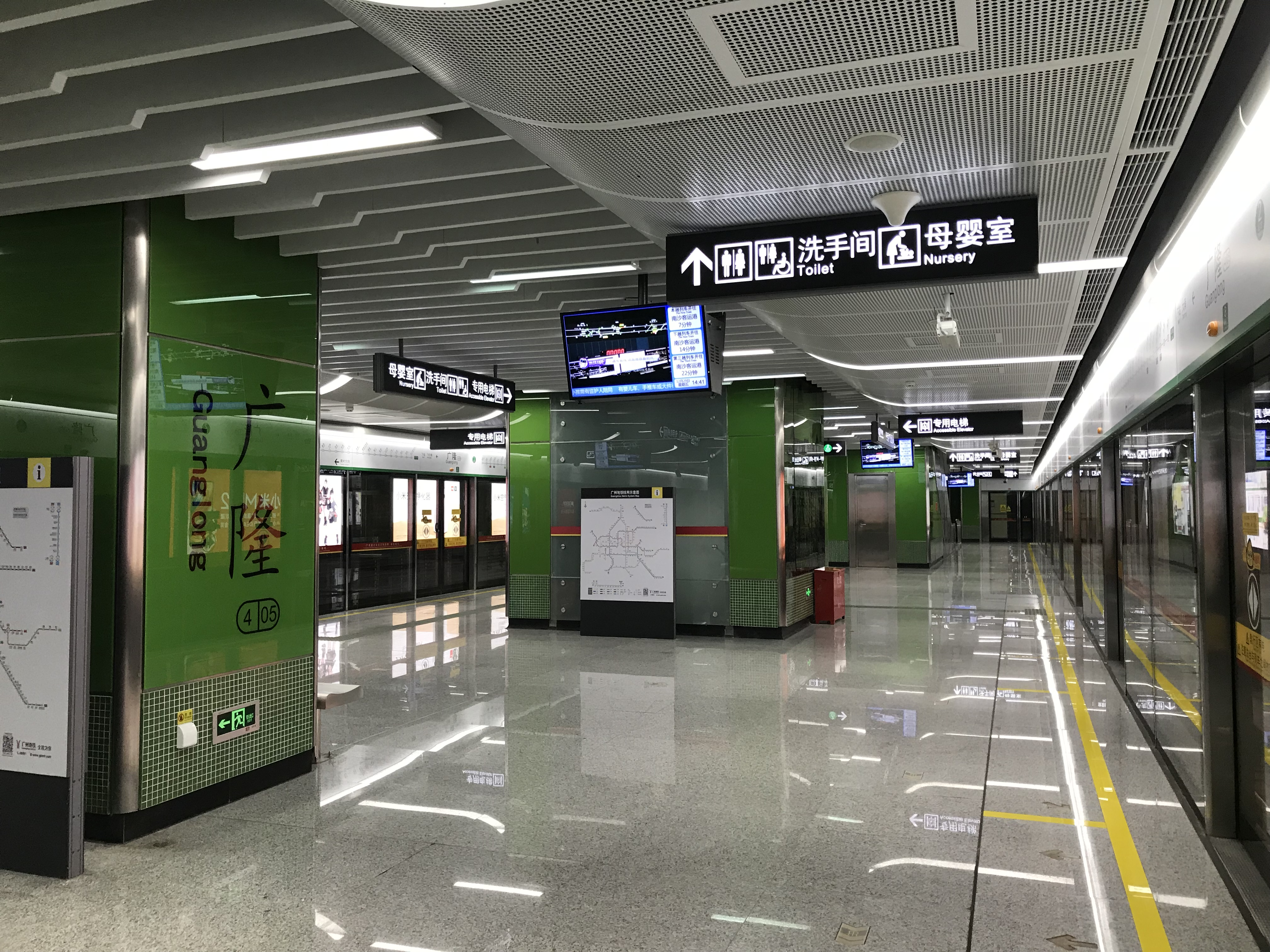

Chinese name
- Simplified Chinese: 广隆站
- Traditional Chinese: 廣隆站
Transcriptions
Standard Mandarin
- Hanyu Pinyin: Guǎnglóng Zhàn
Yue: Cantonese
- Yale Romanization: Gwónglùhng Jaahm
- Jyutping: Gwong^{2}lung^{4} Zaam^{6}
- Hong Kong Romanization: Kwong Lung station

General information
- Location: Huanshi Avenue West (环市大道西) and Guangxing Road (广兴路); Nansha District, Guangzhou, Guangdong; China
- Operator: Guangzhou Metro Co. Ltd.
- Line: Line 4

Construction
- Structure type: Underground

Other information
- Station code: 405

History
- Opened: 28 December 2017; 8 years ago

Services
Preceding station	Guangzhou Metro	Following station
Feishajiao towards Huangcun	Line 4	Dachong towards Nansha Passenger Port
Location

Guanglong station (simplified Chinese: 广隆站; traditional Chinese: 廣隆站; Cantonese Yale: Gwónglùhng Jaahm) is a station of Line 4 of the Guangzhou Metro. It started operations on 28 December 2017.

== Station layout ==
G	-	Exit
L1; Concourse	Lobby	Customer Service, Shops, Vending machines, ATMs
L2; Platforms	Platform 2	4 towards Nansha Passenger Port (Dachong)
L2; Platforms	Island platform, doors will open on the left
L2; Platforms	Platform 1	4 towards Huangcun (Feishajiao)

== Exits ==
Exit number	Exit location
Exit A	Guangxing Lu
Exit C	Guangye Dajie
Exit D	Guangxing Lu
Exit E	Huanshi Dadaoxi
