= Jinzhou station (Guangzhou Metro) =

Guangzhou Metro station

Coordinates: 22°47′32″N 113°32′20″E

Jinzhou 金洲
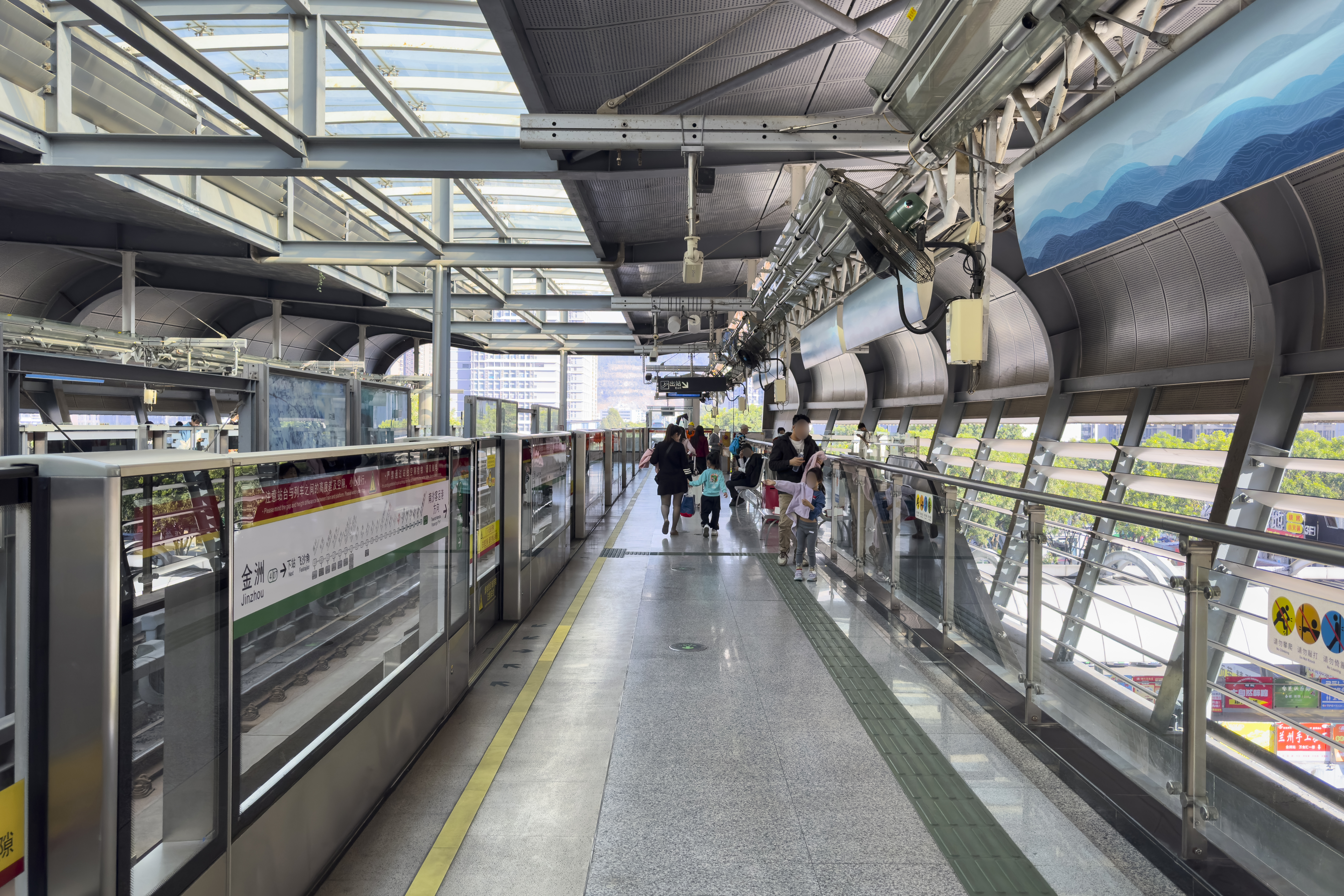

Chinese name
- Simplified Chinese: 金洲站
- Traditional Chinese: 金洲站
Transcriptions
Standard Mandarin
- Hanyu Pinyin: Jīnzhou Zhàn
Yue: Cantonese
- Yale Romanization: Gāmjāu Jaahm
- Jyutping: Gam^{1}zau^{1} Zaam^{6}
- Hong Kong Romanization: Kam Chau station

General information
- Location: Nansha District, Guangzhou, Guangdong; China
- Operated by: Guangzhou Metro Co. Ltd.
- Line: Line 4
- Platforms: 2 (2 side platforms)

Construction
- Structure type: Elevated

Other information
- Station code: 407

History
- Opened: 28 June 2007; 18 years ago

Services
Preceding station	Guangzhou Metro	Following station
Jiaomen towards Huangcun	Line 4	Feishajiao towards Nansha Passenger Port
Location

Jinzhou Station (Chinese: 金洲站; Cantonese Yale: Gāmjāu Jaahm) is an elevated station of Line 4 of the Guangzhou Metro. It started operations on 28 June 2007 and served as the southern terminus of Line 4 until the extension to Nansha Passenger Port. It is located at the junction of Shuangshan Avenue and Guangfeng Road in the town of Huangge, Nansha District.

The previous name of the station was "Chongwei Station" (冲尾站). Since May 2006, its name has changed to Jinzhou Station before the station put into service in 2007.

== Station layout ==
F3; Platforms	Side platform, doors will open on the right
F3; Platforms	Platform 2	4 towards Nansha Passenger Port (Feishajiao)
F3; Platforms	Platform 1	4 towards Huangcun (Jiaomen)
F3; Platforms	Side platform, doors will open on the right
F2; Concourse	Lobby	Customer Service, Shops, Vending machines, ATMs
F2; Concourse	-	Pedestrian overpass
G Equipment Area	-	Exit and Station equipment

== Exits ==
Exit number	Exit location
Exit A	Shuangshan Dadao
