= Nanheng station =

Guangzhou Metro station

Coordinates: 22°44′52″N 113°35′40″E

Nanheng 南横
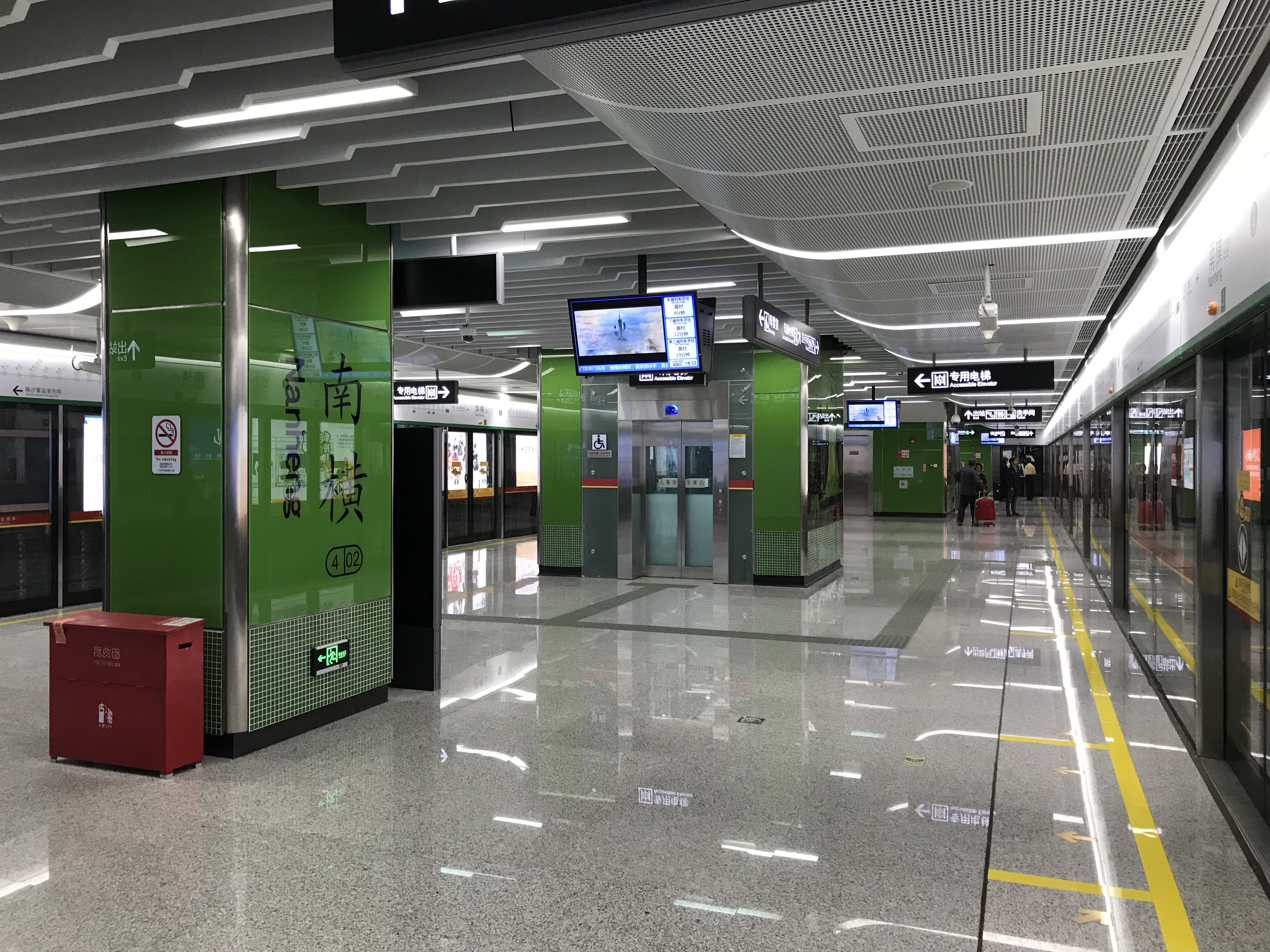

Chinese name
- Simplified Chinese: 南横站
- Traditional Chinese: 南橫站
Transcriptions
Standard Mandarin
- Hanyu Pinyin: Nánhéng Zhàn
Yue: Cantonese
- Yale Romanization: Nàahmwàahng Jaahm
- Jyutping: Naam^{4}waang^{4} Zaam^{6}
- Hong Kong Romanization: Nam Wang station

General information
- Location: Huanshi Avenue (环市大道) and Nanyihui Road (南逸晖路); Nansha District, Guangzhou, Guangdong; China
- Operator: Guangzhou Metro Co. Ltd.
- Line: Line 4

Construction
- Structure type: Underground

Other information
- Station code: 402

History
- Opened: 28 December 2017; 8 years ago

Services
Preceding station	Guangzhou Metro	Following station
Tangkeng towards Huangcun	Line 4	Nansha Passenger Port Terminus
Location

Nanheng station (simplified Chinese: 南横站; traditional Chinese: 南橫站; Cantonese Yale: Nàahmwàahng Jaahm) is a station of Line 4 of the Guangzhou Metro. It started operations on 28 December 2017, and is the southernmost station in the entire Guangzhou Metro system.

== Station layout ==
G	-	Exit
L1; Concourse	Lobby	Customer Service, Shops, Vending machines, ATMs
L2; Platforms	Platform 2	4 towards Nansha Passenger Port (Terminus)
L2; Platforms	Island platform, doors will open on the left
L2; Platforms	Platform 1	4 towards Huangcun (Tangkeng)

== Exits ==
Exit number	Exit location
Exit A	Huanshi Dadaonan
Exit B	Jiangmei Lu
Exit C	Huanshi Dadaonan
