= Line 4 (Guangzhou Metro) =

Line of the Guangzhou Metro

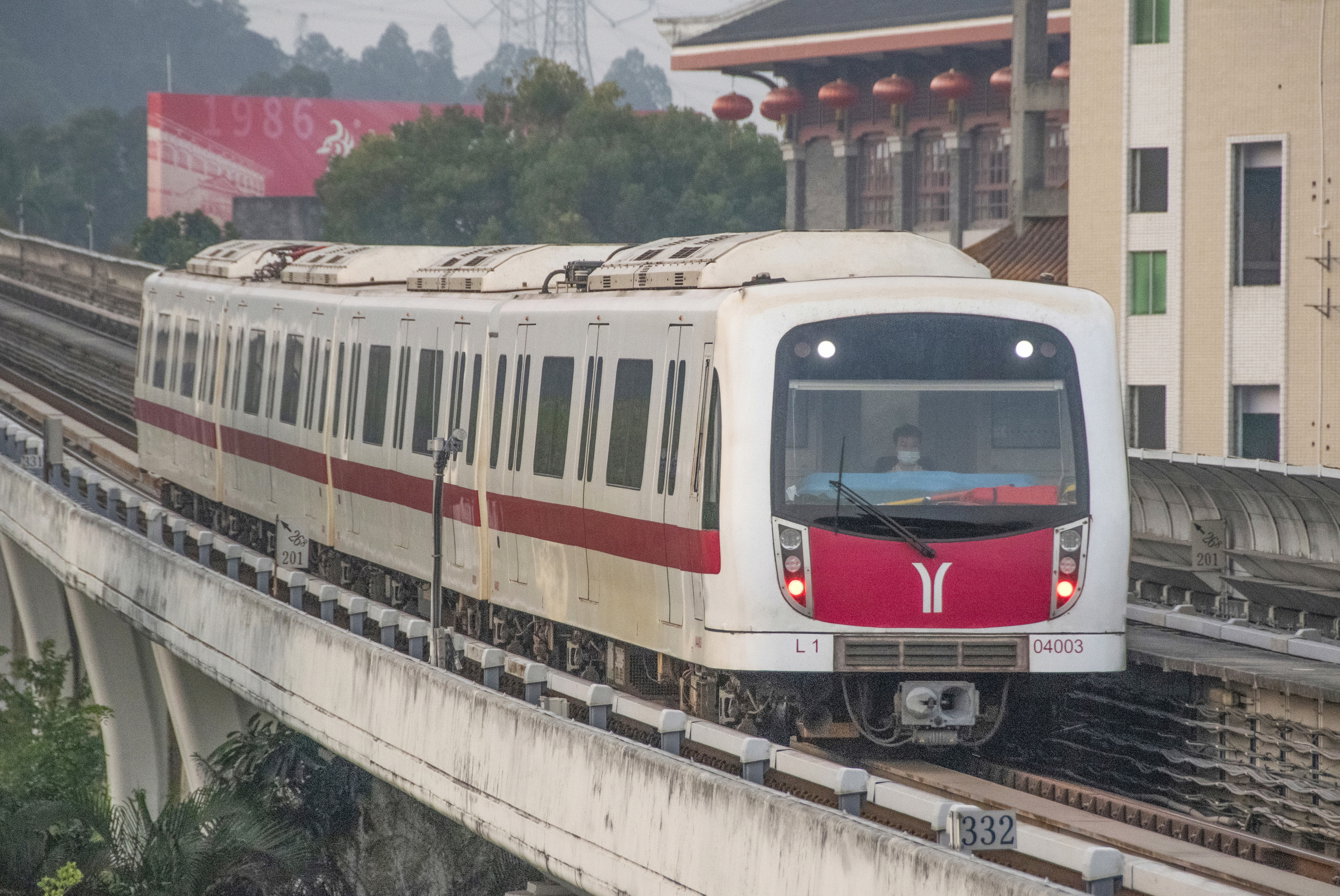
- Line 4 L1 train near Shiqi

Overview
- Other name(s): M5b (7 lines plan name); M4 (2000 plan name); Nansha line (南沙线)
- Status: Operational
- Owner: City of Guangzhou
- Locale: Nansha, Panyu, Haizhu and Tianhe districts Guangzhou, Guangdong
- Termini: Nansha Passenger Port; Huangcun
- Stations: 23

Service
- Type: Rapid transit
- System: Guangzhou Metro
- Services: 2
- Operator: Guangzhou Metro Corporation
- Rolling stock: CRRC Qingdao Sifang/ Kawasaki Heavy Industries; Metro cars
- Daily ridership: 373,900 (2017 daily average); 556,000 (2019 Peak)

History
- Opened: 26 December 2005; 20 years ago

Technical
- Line length: 60.03 km (37.30 mi)
- Number of tracks: 2
- Character: Underground + Elevated
- Track gauge: 1,435 mm (4 ft 8 1/2 in)
- Electrification: Third rail, 1,500 V DC (Overhead lines with same voltage installed in depot and zig zag tracks near Nansha Passenger Port Station)
- Operating speed: 85 km/h (53 mph)

Line 4
- Simplified Chinese: 广州地铁4号线
- Traditional Chinese: 廣州地鐵4號線
Transcriptions
Standard Mandarin
- Hanyu Pinyin: Guǎngzhōu Dìtiě Sì Hào Xiàn
Yue: Cantonese
- Jyutping: gwong^{2}zau^{1} dei^{6}tit^{3} sei^{3} hou^{6} sin^{3}

Line 4 of the Guangzhou Metro is a south-north line on the system that runs between Nansha Passenger Port and Huangcun stations, spanning a total of 60.03 km (37.30 mi) with 24 stations (while Guanqiao not yet in service). The sections of the line from Xinzao to Huangcun and Feishajiao to Nansha Passenger Port is underground, while the section from Jinzhou to Guanqiao is above ground. Line 4's colour is dark green. Like line 5 and 6, trains runs with linear motor technology.

== History ==
=== Early Planning ===
A line resembling the current northern section of Line 4 first appeared in plans for Guangzhou Metro in 1997. It would have been a branch off what was called Line 5 at the time, running from Pazhou to Grand World Scenic Park.

By 2000, it had been separated into its own line and realigned to run from Xinzhao to Guangzhou Science City, with construction slated to start in 2002 or 2003, pending approval, and expected completion in 2010.

The line received planning approval in 2005, planned to eventually connect the new districts of Luogang in the north and Nansha in the south. Four carriage linear motor train sets would run on the line, with the full line expected to need 30 sets initially.

=== Phase 1 (Huangcun - Xinzhao) ===
Work on the line commenced on 28 January 2003, initially focusing on the northern terminus and interchange station with Line 2 (now Line 8), Chigang Pagoda station (since renamed Wanshengwei). The first section would run from here to Xinzhao via Guangzhou Higher Education Mega Center, with a total of 5 stations.

With planning approval, this early work now formed part of Phase 1 from Olympic Sports Center (since renamed Huangcun) to Xinzhao, with a total of 8 stations, as well as a maintenance and stabling facility in Xinzhao.

Phase 1 between Wanshengwei and Xinzhao stations opened for passenger service on 26 December 2005. The line initially operated at a very low frequency of approximately every 32 minutes, as only a single train was ready for service of the two that had arrived.

The line was extended one stop north to Chebeinan on 28 December 2009, providing an interchange to Line 5 which opened on the same day.

The final section of Phase 1 (Chebeinan to Huangcun) opened on 25 September 2010.

=== Phase 2 (Xinzhao - Jinzhou) ===
A southward extension to the line, Phase 2, was approved in 2006. It would run from Xinzhao to Chongwei (since renamed Jinzhou), with a total of 10 stations, including 2 designated infill stations to be built later. Unlike phase 1, this section would be built elevated on a viaduct.

The first section of Phase 2 between Xinzao and Huangge opened on 30 December 2006, following a 9 day full line closure for train testing.

In the following year, the line again closed on 8 May for further testing, with replacement buses being provided. Upon reopening on 28 June, the remaining section of Phase 2 between Huangge and Jinzhou was opened for passenger service.

The first of the infill stations opened as Qingsheng on 28 December 2017, together with Phase 3 of the line. Work began on the second, named Guanqiao, in 2021. It was planned to be completed in 2024 but has not opened as of May 2026.

=== Phase 3 (Jinzhou - Nansha Passenger Port) ===
In 2012, as part of the Guangzhou Urban Rail Transport Near-term Plan (2012-2018), a further southern extension of Line 4 to Nansha Passenger Port was approved, with a further 5 stations to be completed between 2013 and 2017.

Work on the extension was officially started in Jinlong station (since renamed Feishajiao) on 31 May 2013.

Phase 3 opened in full on 28 December 2017.

=== Opening timeline ===
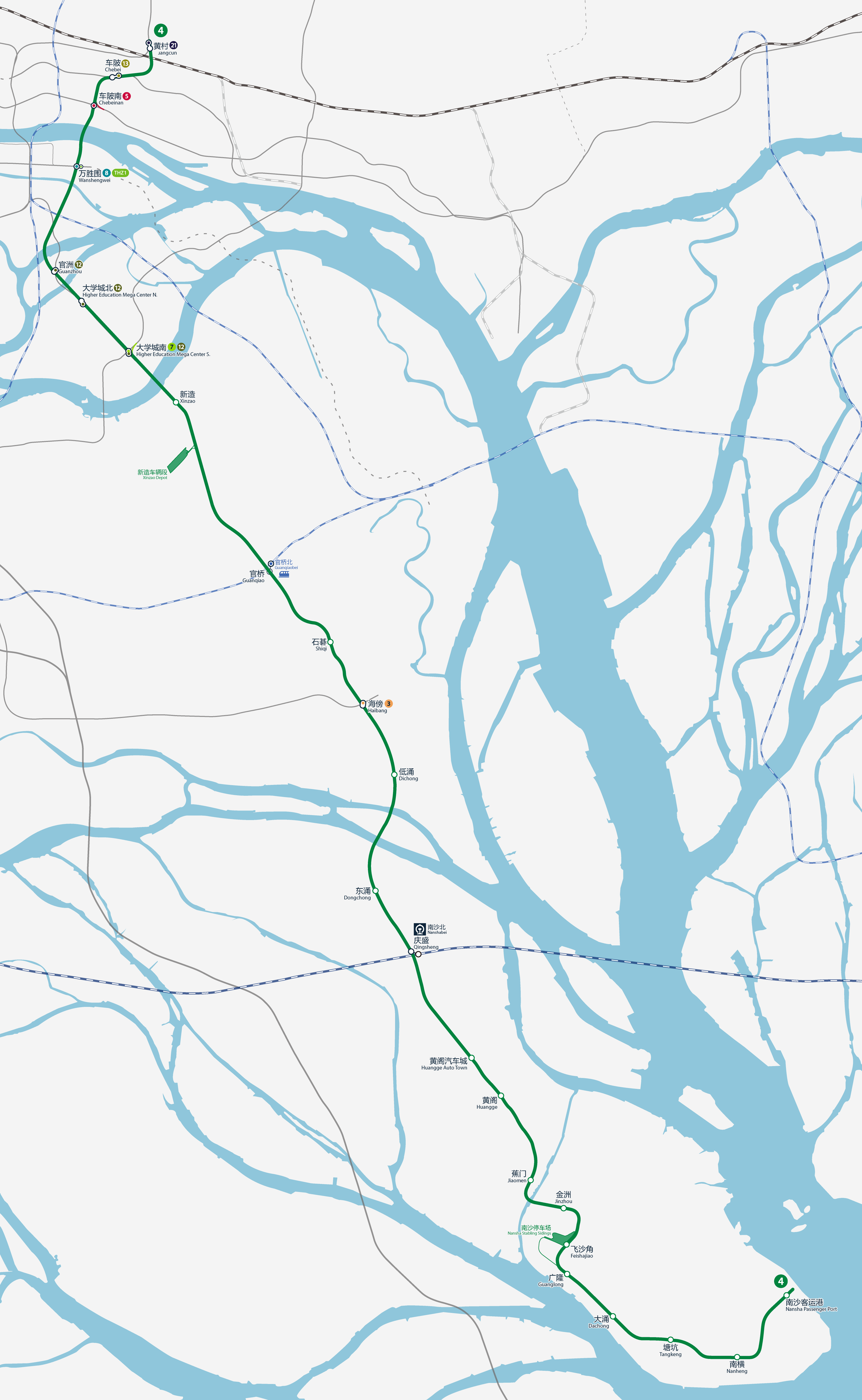
Line 4 drawn to scale.

Segment	Commencement	Length	Station(s)	Name
Xinzao — Wanshengwei	26 December 2005	16.2 km (10.07 mi)	5	(1st section)
Huangge — Xinzao	30 December 2006	22.3 km (13.86 mi)	6	(2nd section)
Jinzhou — Huangge	28 June 2007	5.1 km (3.17 mi)	2	(3rd section)
Wanshengwei — Chebeinan	28 December 2009	3.8 km (2.36 mi)	1	Line 4 & 5 connector project
Chebeinan — Huangcun	25 September 2010	2.0 km (1.24 mi)	2	Northern extension
Nansha Passenger Port — Jinzhou	28 December 2017	13.64 km (8.48 mi)	6	Southern extension
Qingsheng	28 December 2017	Infill station	1	Guangshengang XRL connector

== Stations ==
Service routes		Station №	Station name		Connections	Future Connections	Distance km		Location
Service routes		Station №	English	Chinese	Connections	Future Connections	Distance km		Location
●		401	Nansha Passenger Port	南沙客运港		15	0.00	0.00	Nansha
●		402	Nanheng	南横			2.97	2.97	Nansha
●		403	Tangkeng	塘坑			2.30	5.27	Nansha
●		404	Dachong	大涌			2.01	7.28	Nansha
●		405	Guanglong	广隆			2.14	9.42	Nansha
●		406	Feishajiao	飞沙角			1.91	11.33	Nansha
●		407	Jinzhou	金洲			2.31	13.64	Nansha
●		408	Jiaomen	蕉门		15	2.00	15.64	Nansha
●		409	Huangge	黄阁			3.00	18.64	Nansha
●		410	Huangge Auto Town	黄阁汽车城			1.54	20.18	Nansha
●		411	Qingsheng	庆盛	QSQ GSH		4.07	24.25	Nansha
●		412	Dongchong	东涌			2.39	26.64	Nansha
●		413	Dichong	低涌			3.94	30.58	Panyu
●		414	Haibang	海傍	3 301-4		2.45	33.03	Panyu
●		415	Shiqi	石碁			2.25	35.28	Panyu
｜		416	Guanqiao	官桥	GQA GH		2.49	37.77	Panyu
●	●	417	Xinzao	新造			7.25	45.02	Panyu
●	●	418	Higher Education Mega Center South	大学城南	7 709 12 1225		2.25	47.27	Panyu
●	●	419	Higher Education Mega Center North	大学城北	12 1224		2.22	49.49	Panyu
●	●	420	Guanzhou	官洲	12 1223		1.39	50.88	Haizhu
●	●	421	Wanshengwei	万胜围	8 828; THZ1 THZ110		3.69	54.57	Haizhu
●	●	422	Chebeinan	车陂南	5 518		2.07	56.64	Tianhe
●	●	423	Chebei	车陂	13 1322 GBRT		1.23	57.87	Tianhe
●	●	424	Huangcun	黄村	21 2104; JSQ		2.16	60.03	Tianhe

== Operations ==
On 9 May 2015, Line 4 commenced short working operations, with selected trains running only between Huangcun and Xinzao. This allowed headways in the busier northern section of the line to be reduced to as low as 3 minutes in the morning peak, serving the rapidly growing Huangcun and Higher Education Mega Center areas.

== Fleet ==
Line 4 uses four carriage linear motor L type trains. Each set is 71 m (233 ft) long, 2.8 m (9.2 ft) wide and has a maximum service speed of 90 km/h (56 mph).

Thirty trainsets (designated class L1) were initially ordered for the line, to be manufactured by Kawasaki Heavy Industries in collaboration with CSR Sifang. The first set rolled off the production line in Qingdao on 27 November 2005 and the final set was delivered in March 2008.

A further 27 sets (designated class L5) were ordered ahead of the Phase 3 extension to Nansha Passenger Port. These were manufacturered fully domestically by CSR Sifang. The first four sets ran under their own power for the first time on 20 May 2017 and all sets had been delivered by 2 August the same year.
