= Tangkeng station =

Tangkeng station may refer to:

- Tangkeng station (Guangzhou Metro), a station on the Guangzhou Metro in Guangzhou, Guangdong.
- Tangkeng station (Shenzhen Metro), a station on the Shenzhen Metro in Shenzhen, Guangdong.
