= JSQ (disambiguation) =

JSQ is Journal Square Transportation Center, Jersey City, New Jersey, US.

JSQ may also refer to:

- Jewish Studies Quarterly, a journal published by Mohr Siebeck
- Jianshan District (division code), in the List of administrative divisions of Heilongjiang, China
- Juilliard String Quartet, Juilliard School, New York, US
- Tianhe East railway station (telegraph code), China
