= Xiayuan station =

Xiayuan station may refer to the following stations with different Chinese names:

- Xiayuan station (Guangzhou Metro) (夏园站), a station on Line 5 and Line 13 of the Guangzhou Metro.
- Xiayuan railway station (下元站), a station on Guangzhou–Shenzhen railway.
