= Tangkeng station (Guangzhou Metro) =

Guangzhou Metro station

Coordinates: 22°45′11″N 113°34′23″E

Tangkeng 塘坑
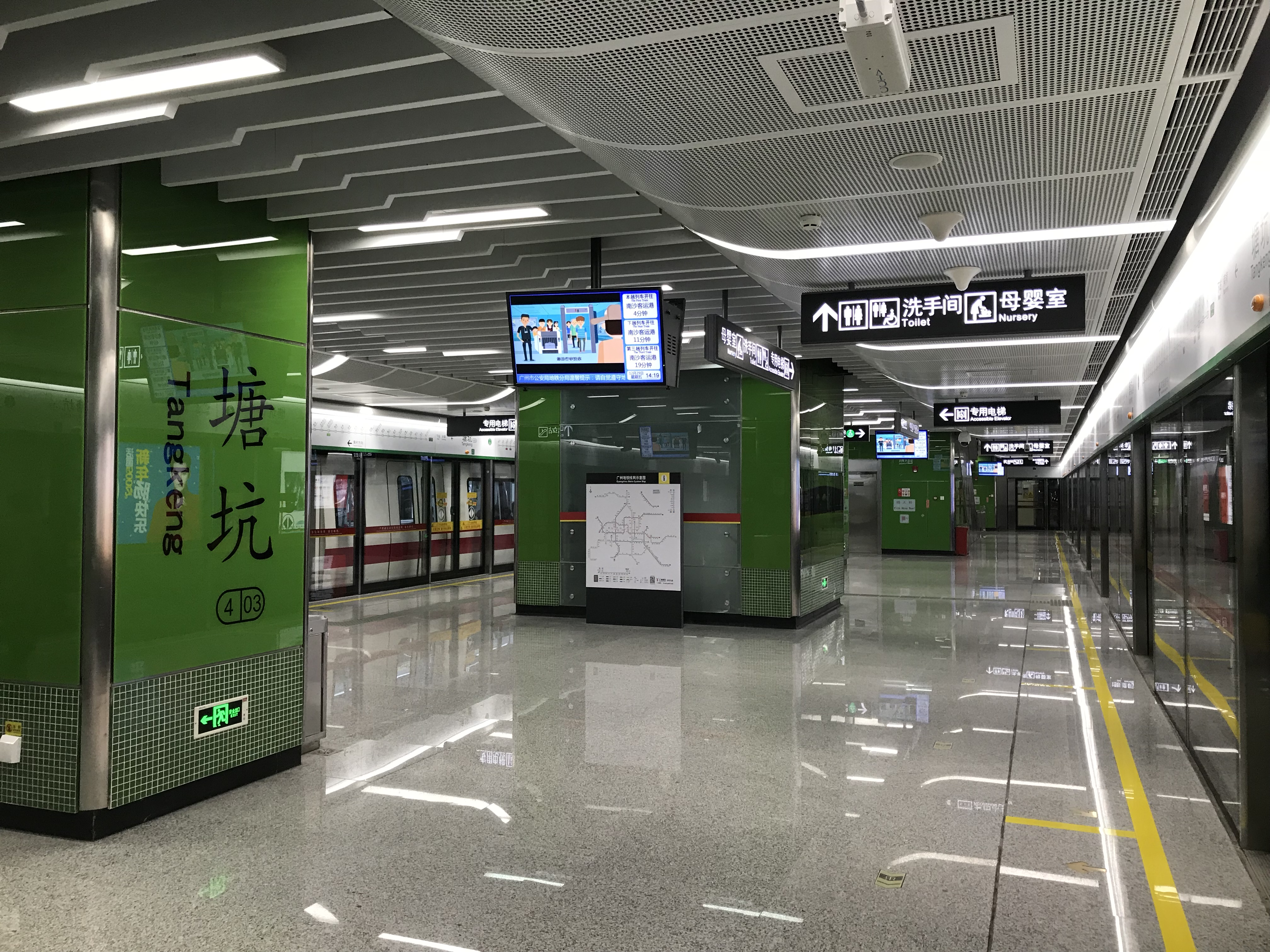

Chinese name
- Chinese: 塘坑站
Transcriptions
Standard Mandarin
- Hanyu Pinyin: Tángkēng Zhàn
Yue: Cantonese
- Yale Romanization: Tòhnghāang Jaahm
- Jyutping: Tong^{4}haang^{1} Zaam^{6}
- Hong Kong Romanization: Tong Hang station

General information
- Location: Huanshi Avenue West (环市大道西); Nansha District, Guangzhou, Guangdong; China
- Operator: Guangzhou Metro Co. Ltd.
- Line: Line 4

Construction
- Structure type: Underground

Other information
- Station code: 403

History
- Opened: 28 December 2017; 8 years ago

Services
Preceding station	Guangzhou Metro	Following station
Dachong towards Huangcun	Line 4	Nanheng towards Nansha Passenger Port
Location

Tangkeng station (Chinese: 塘坑站; Cantonese Yale: Tòhnghāang Jaahm) is a station of Line 4 of the Guangzhou Metro. It started operations on 28 December 2017.

== Station layout ==
G	-	Exit
L1; Concourse	Lobby	Customer Service, Shops, Vending machines, ATMs
L2; Platforms	Platform 2	4 towards Nansha Passenger Port (Nanheng)
L2; Platforms	Island platform, doors will open on the left
L2; Platforms	Platform 1	4 towards Huangcun (Dachong)

== Exits ==
Exit number	Exit location
Exit C	Yingdong Dadao
Exit D	Huanshi Dadaoxi
