= Nansha, Guangzhou =

Nansha 南沙区 / 南沙新区
- District and State-level new area
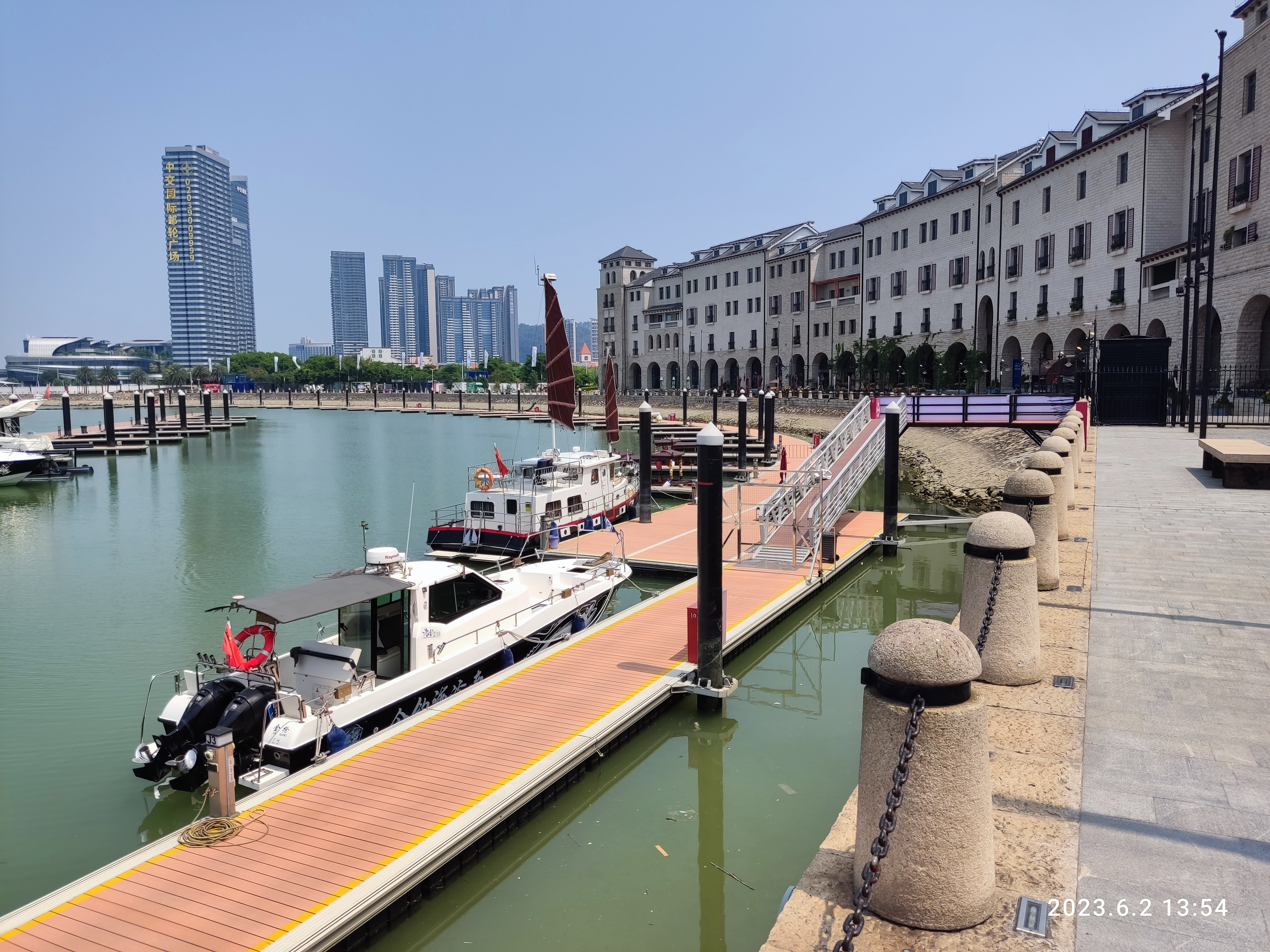
- Nansha Marina

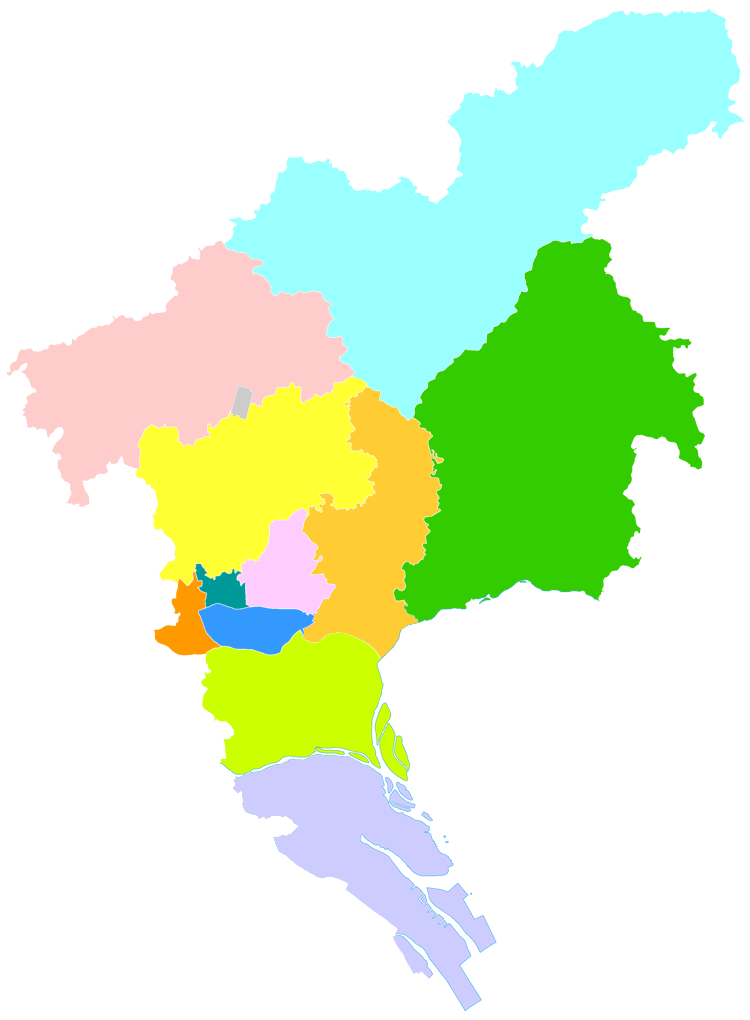
- Nansha in Guangzhou
- Coordinates: 22°50′18″N 113°36′30″E
- Country: People's Republic of China
- Province: Guangdong
- Sub-provincial city: Guangzhou

Area
  - Total: 803 km^{2} (310 sq mi)

Population (2020)
  - Total: 846,584
  - Density: 1,050/km^{2} (2,730/sq mi)
- Time zone: UTC+8 (China Standard)
- Postal code: 511455
- Area code: 020
- Website: http://www.gzns.gov.cn/

Nansha, Guangzhou
- Simplified Chinese: 南沙区
- Traditional Chinese: 南沙區
- Guangdong Romanization: nam4 sa1 kêu1
- Hanyu Pinyin: Nánshā Qū
Transcriptions
Standard Mandarin
- Hanyu Pinyin: Nánshā Qū
Yue: Cantonese
- Yale Romanization: Nàahmsā Kēui
- Jyutping: naam4 saa1 keoi1
- Canton Romanization: nam4 sa1 kêu1

Alternative Chinese name
- Simplified Chinese: 南沙新区
- Traditional Chinese: 南沙新區
- Guangdong Romanization: nam4 sa1 sen1 kêu1
- Hanyu Pinyin: Nánshā Xīnqū
Transcriptions
Standard Mandarin
- Hanyu Pinyin: Nánshā Xīnqū
Yue: Cantonese
- Yale Romanization: Nàahmsā Sànkēui
- Jyutping: naam4 saa1 san1 keoi1
- Canton Romanization: nam4 sa1 sen1 kêu1

Second alternative Chinese name
- Chinese: 南沙
- Guangdong Romanization: nam4 sa1
- Hanyu Pinyin: Nánshā
- Literal meaning: south sands
Transcriptions
Standard Mandarin
- Hanyu Pinyin: Nánshā
Yue: Cantonese
- Yale Romanization: Nàahmsā
- Jyutping: naam4 saa1
- Canton Romanization: nam4 sa1

Nansha District and Nansha New Area is one of 11 urban districts, the southernmost district, and a state-level new area of the prefecture-level city of Guangzhou, the capital of Guangdong Province, China. It is the home of the present-day port of Guangzhou, as well as the Nansha Wetland Park.

The Nansha Technology Development Zone was carved out of Panyu District in 1993. In 2005, it was named Nansha District. In September 2012, Nansha was designated a State-level New Area as Nansha New Area, the sixth such area.

== New area ==
Nansha is the newly established state-level new area (special economic and political administration zone) under the direct control of Guangzhou Municipal Government in September 2012.

In September 2012 Nansha New Area was approved by the State Council of China's Central Government as the sixth state-level new area (followed by Pudong of Shanghai, Binhai of Tianjin, Liangjiang of Chongqing, Zhoushan of Zhejiang, and Lanzhou New Area, Gansu), which is also the first state-level new development area in South Central China.

== Geography ==
Nansha District is located at the southernmost end of Guangzhou City, Guangdong Province, facing Dongguan City across the river in the east, bordering Zhongshan City and Shunde District in Foshan City in the west, connecting with Panyu District in Guangzhou City across the water with the Shawan Waterway as the boundary, and adjacent to Lingding, the outlet of the Pearl River in the south. Ocean, between 22°26′～23°06′ north latitude and 113°13′～113°43′ east longitude, with a total area of 803 square kilometers.

== Administrative divisions ==
| Name | Chinese (S) | Hanyu Pinyin | Canton Romanization | Population (2010) | Area (km^{2}) |
|---|---|---|---|---|---|
| Nansha Subdistrict | 南沙街道 | Nánshā Jiēdào | nam4 sa1 gai1 dou6 | 112,151 | 57.80 |
| Zhujiang Subdistrict | 珠江街道 | Zhūjiāng Jiēdào | ju1 gong1 gai1 dou6 | 28,575 | 41.50 |
| Longxue Subdistrict | 龙穴街道 | Lóngxué Jiēdào | lung4 yud6 gai1 dou6 | 44,891 | 128.90 |
| Wanqingsha Town | 万顷沙镇 | Wànqǐngshā Zhèn | man6 king2 sa1 zen3 | 44,891 | 319.20 |
| Huangge Town | 黄阁镇 | Huánggé Zhèn | wong4 gog3 zen3 | 43,791 | 76.50 |
| Hengli Town | 横沥镇 | Hénglì Zhèn | wang4 lig6 zen3 | 30,492 | 54.00 |
| Dongchong Town | 东涌镇 | Dōngchōng Zhèn | dung1 chung1 zen3 | 147,228 | 92.00 |
| Dagang Town | 大岗镇 | Dàgǎng Zhèn | dai6 gong1 zen3 | 125,011 | 90.07 |
| Lanhe Town | 榄核镇 | Lǎnhé Zhèn | lam5 wed6 zen3 | 73,078 | 74.48 |

== Transportation ==
=== Metro ===
Nansha is currently served by 2 metro lines operated by Guangzhou Metro:

- Line 4 - Dongchong, Qingsheng, Huangge Auto Town, Huangge, Jiaomen, Jinzhou, Feishajiao, Guanglong, Dachong, Tangkeng, Nanheng, Nansha Passenger Port
- Line 18 - Hengli, Wanqingsha

== Gallery ==
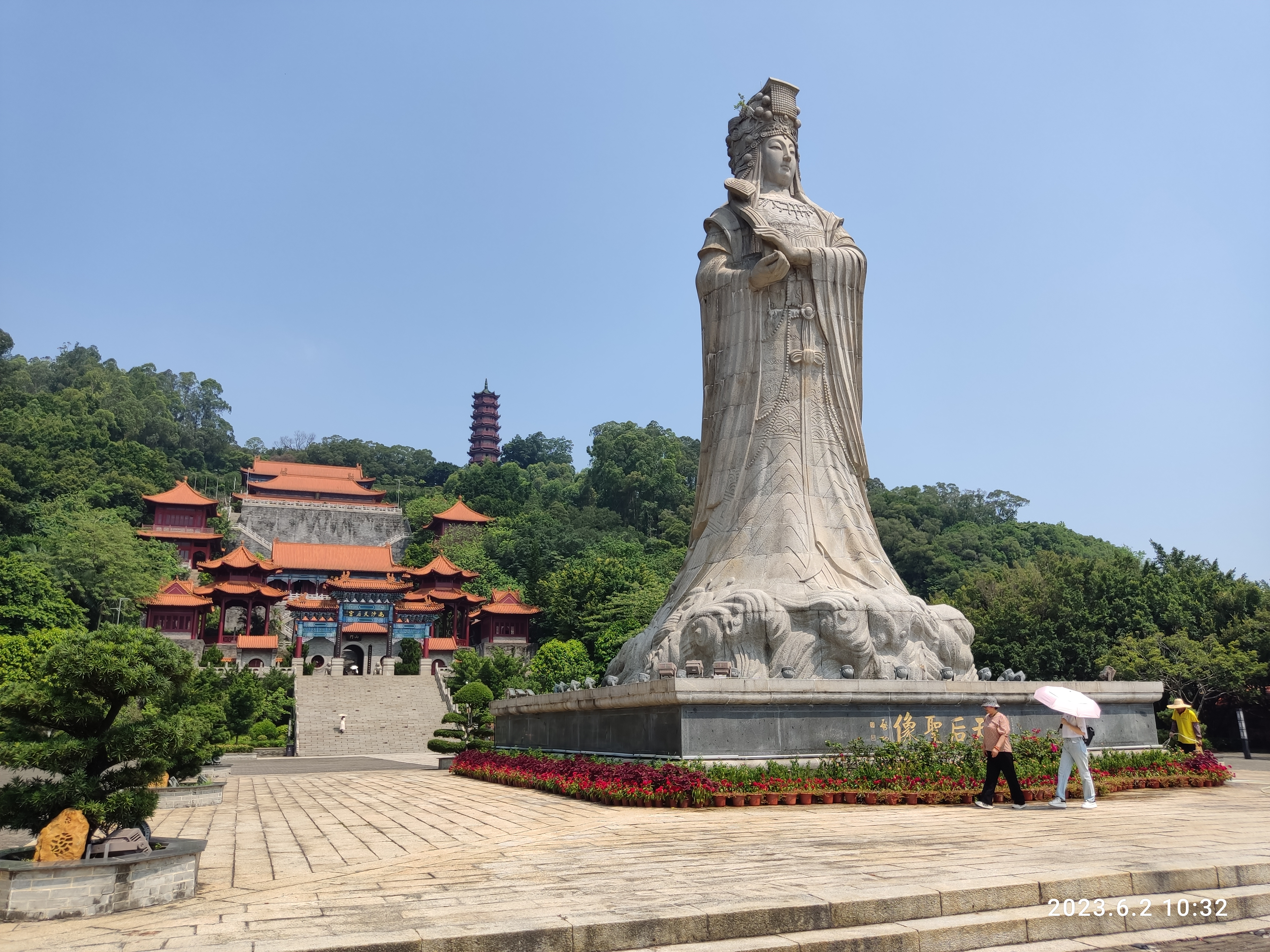
Nansha Tianhou Palace

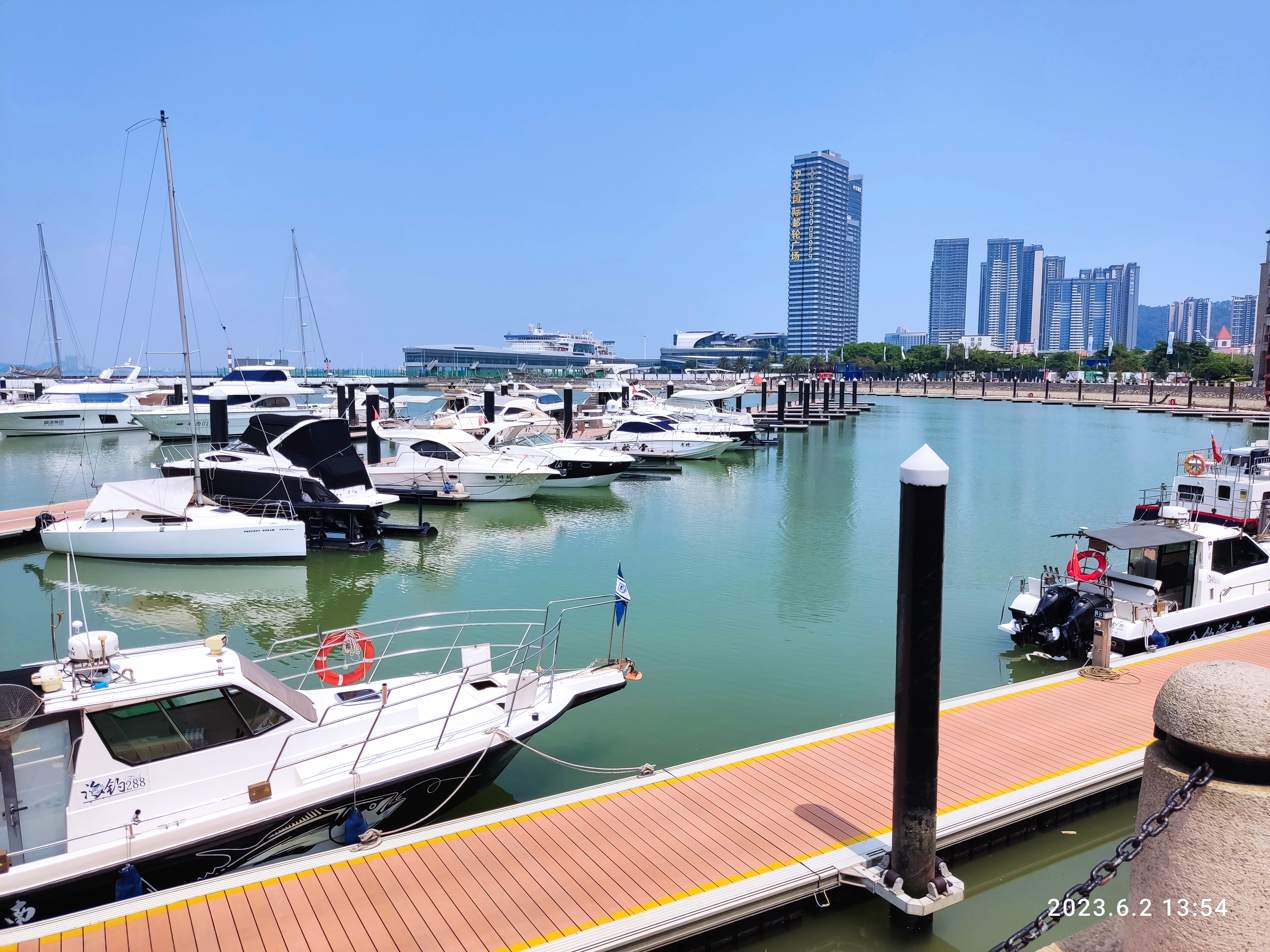
Nansha Marina

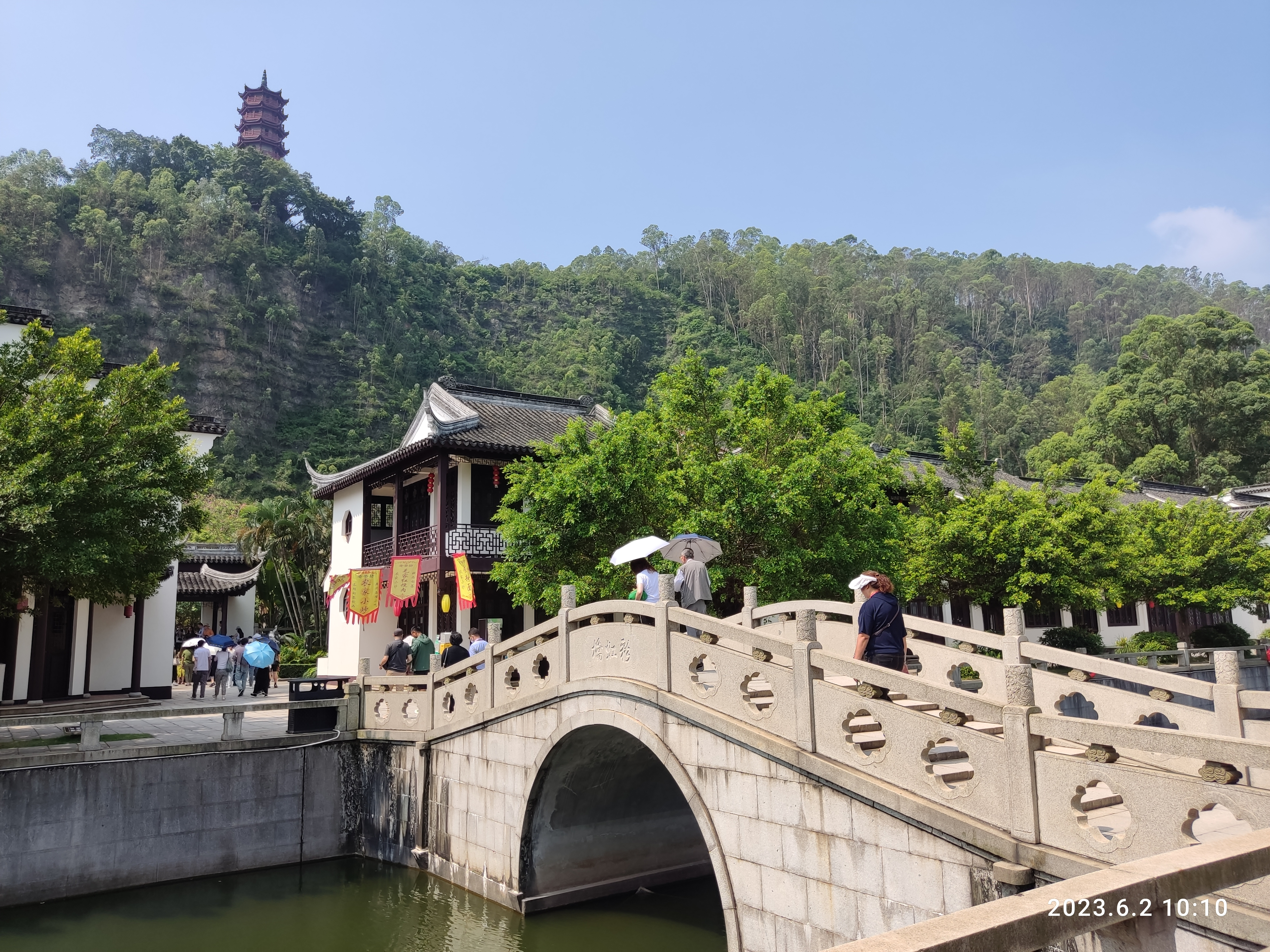
Puzhou Garden

== See also ==
- Chinese cutter Nansha - named for the district
