= Xiayuan railway station =

Railway station in Guangzhou, China

Coordinates: 23.12°N 113.49°E

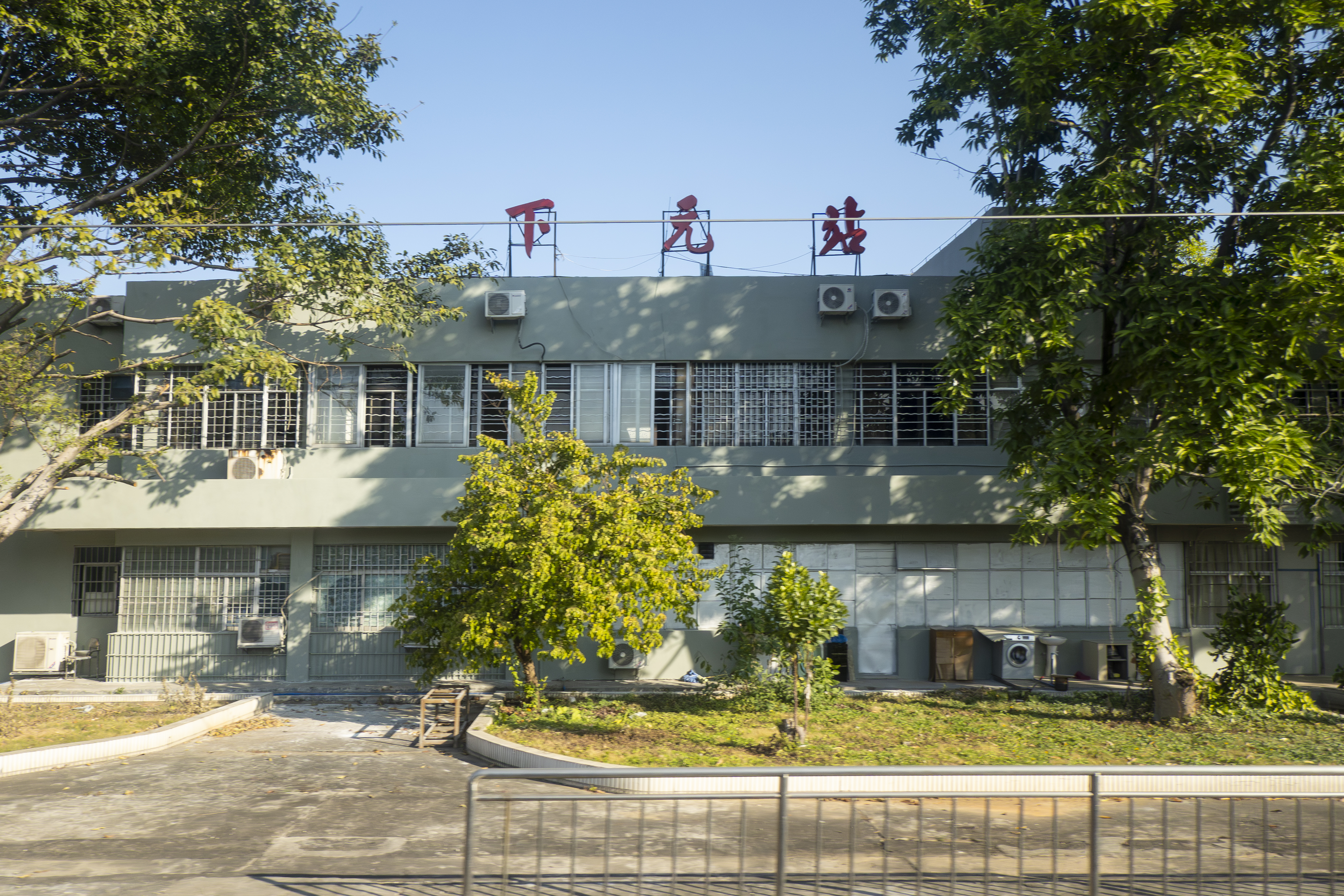
Xiayuan railway station

Xiayuan (下元站) is a railway station in Xiayuan, Huangpu District, Guangzhou, Guangdong, China. It is a station on the Guangshen Railway and managed by the Guangshen Railway Company. It was built in 1975 and is a class 3 station on the national railway station scale.

Preceding station	China Railway	Following station
Tianhe East towards Guangzhou	Guangzhou–Shenzhen railway	Guangzhou Xintang towards Shenzhen
