= Tianhe East railway station =

Railway station in Guangzhou, China

Tianhe East 天河东站
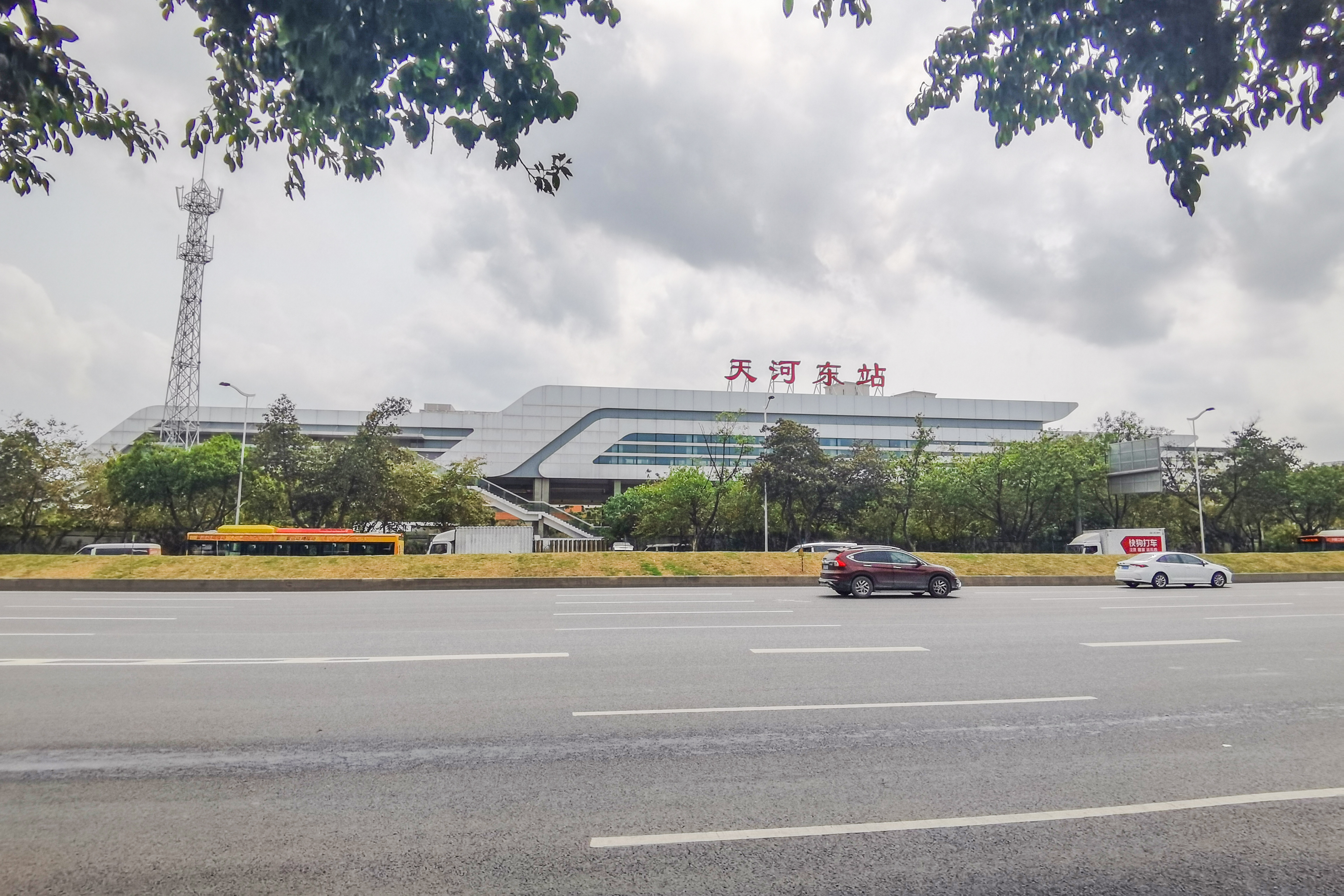

General information
- Other names: Jishan Railway Station (until 2018)
- Location: China
- Coordinates: 23°7′38″N 113°25′8″E
- Operated by: CR Guangzhou
- Line(s): Guangzhou–Shenzhen Railway

Other information
- Station code: 23717 (TMIS code); JSQ (telegraph code)
- Classification: Class 3 station

History
- Opened: 1916

Services
Preceding station	China Railway	Following station
Guangzhou East towards Guangzhou	Guangzhou–Shenzhen railway	Xiayuan towards Shenzhen

Tianhe East railway station (Tianhedong railway station), formerly known as Jishan railway station, is a railway station in Jishan, Dongpu, Tianhe District, Guangzhou, Guangdong, China. It is a station on the Guangshen Railway and managed by the Guangshen Railway Company. It was built in 1916 and is a class 3 station on the national railway station scale.
