= Huangge =

Huangge Town 黄阁镇
- Town
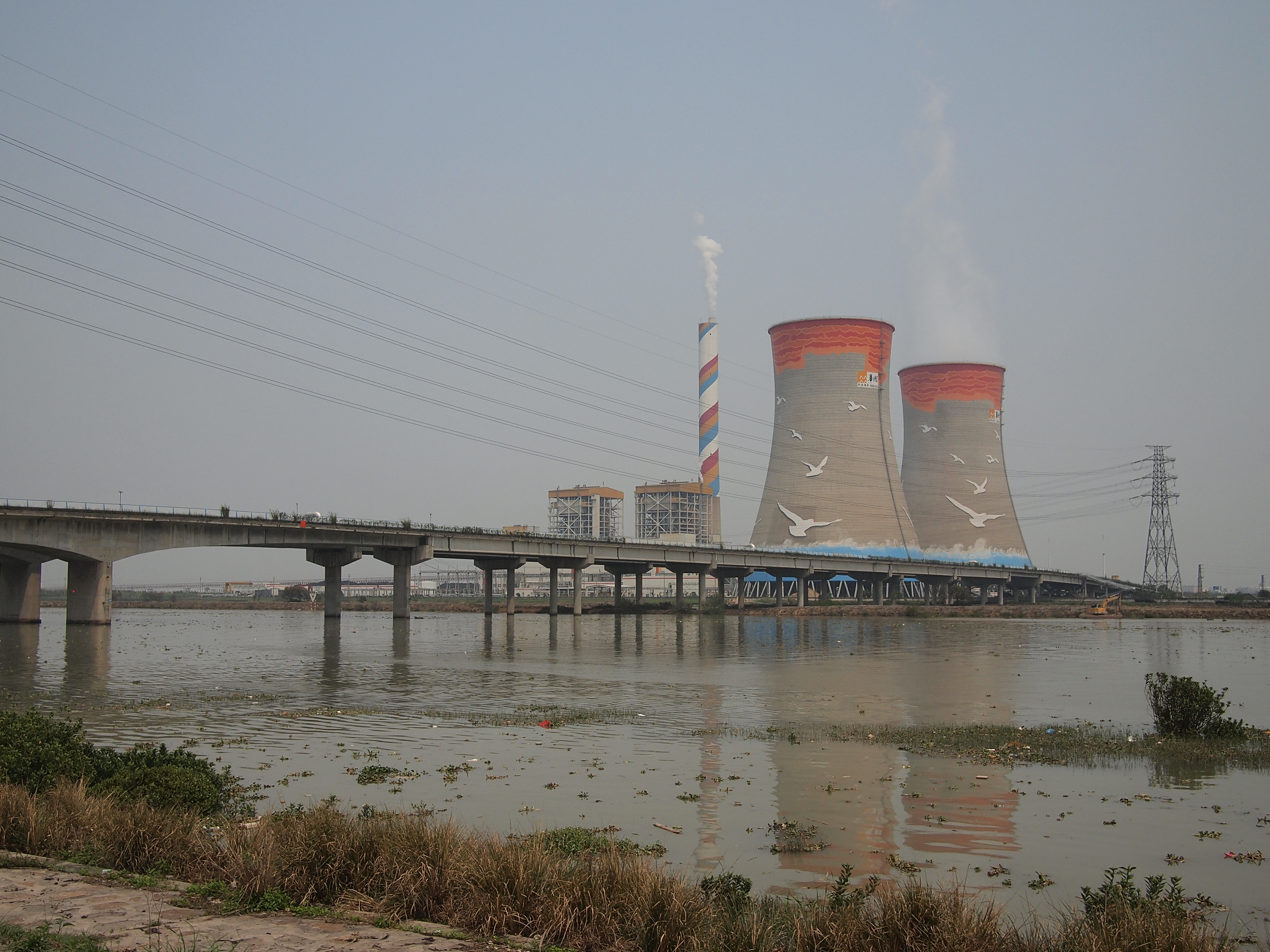

- Location in Guangdong
- Coordinates: 22°49′27″N 113°30′36″E
- Country: People's Republic of China
- Province: Guangdong
- Sub-provincial city: Guangzhou
- District: Nansha
- Time zone: UTC+8 (China Standard)
- Website: www.gzns.gov.cn/nshgz/

Huangge (黄阁镇) is a town in the Nansha District of Guangzhou, the largest city in the People's Republic of China.
