= Nansha Passenger Port station =

Metro station in Guangzhou, China

Coordinates: 22°46′01″N 113°36′39″E

Nansha Passenger Port 南沙客运港
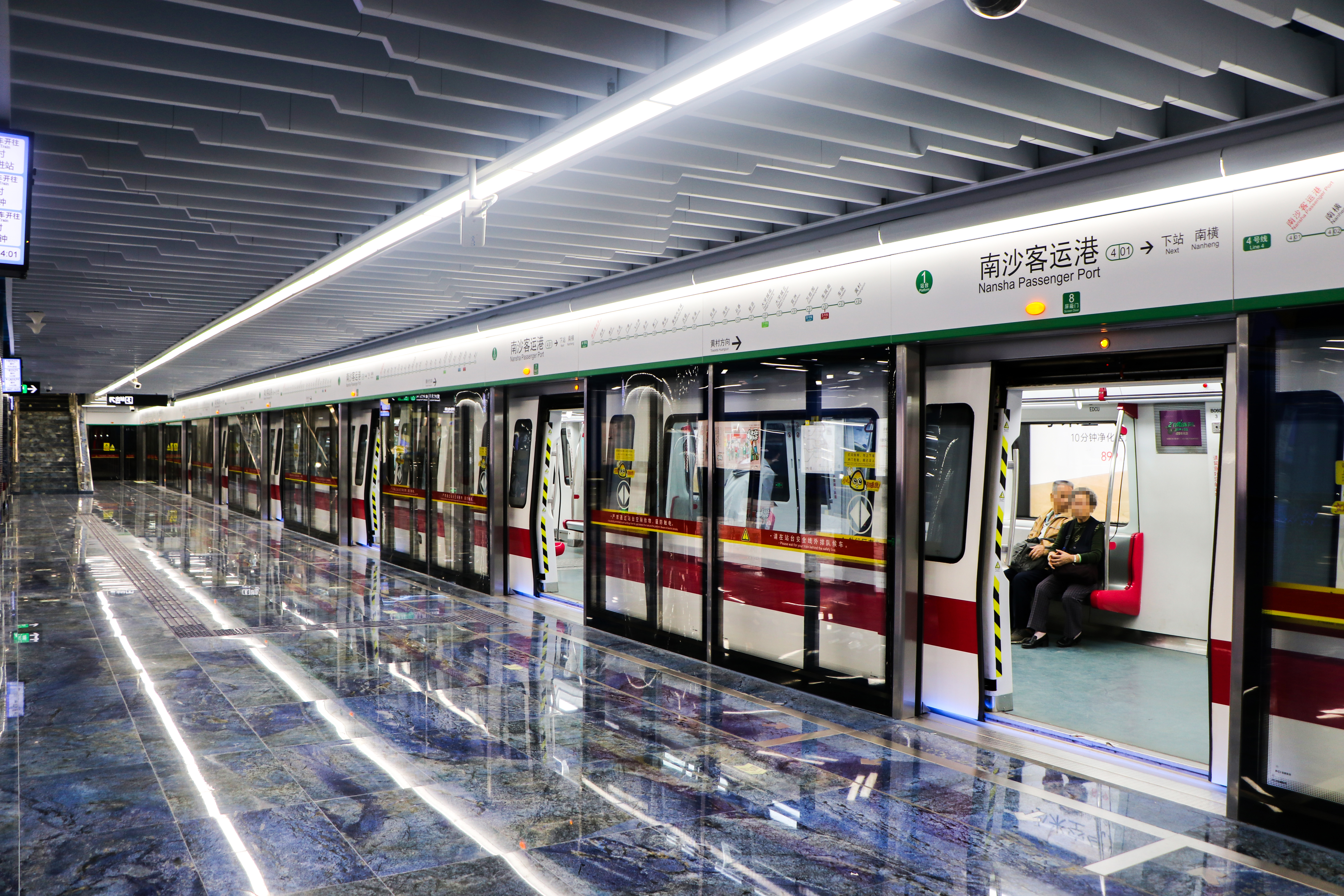

Chinese name
- Simplified Chinese: 南沙客运港站
- Traditional Chinese: 南沙客運港站
Transcriptions
Standard Mandarin
- Hanyu Pinyin: Nánshā Kèyùngǎng Zhàn
Yue: Cantonese
- Yale Romanization: Nàahmsā Haak'wahngóng Jaahm
- Jyutping: Naam^{4}saa^{1} Haak^{3}wan^{6}gong^{2} Zaam^{6}
- Hong Kong Romanization: Nam Sha Passenger Port station

General information
- Location: Haigang Avenue (海港大道) and Gangqian Avenue (港前大道); Nansha District, Guangzhou, Guangdong; China
- Operator: Guangzhou Metro Co. Ltd.
- Line: Line 4

Construction
- Structure type: underground

Other information
- Station code: 401

History
- Opened: 28 December 2017; 8 years ago

Services
| Preceding station | Guangzhou Metro | Following station |
|---|---|---|
| Nanheng towards Huangcun | Line 4 | Terminus |
Location

Nansha Passenger Port station (simplified Chinese: 南沙客运港站; traditional Chinese: 南沙客運港站; Cantonese Yale: Nàahmsā Haak'wahngóng Jaahm) is a station and the southern terminus of Line 4 of the Guangzhou Metro. It started operations on 28 December 2017.

== Station layout ==
| G | - | Exit |
| L1; Concourse | Lobby | Customer service, shops, vending machines, ATMs |
| L2; Buffer area & platforms | Buffer area | Buffer area of Line 4 |
| L2; Buffer area & platforms | Platform | 15 U/C |
| L2; Buffer area & platforms | Reserved island platform |
| L2; Buffer area & platforms | Platform | 15 U/C |
| L3; Platforms | Side platform, doors will open on the right |
| L3; Platforms | Platform 2 | 4 termination platform |
| L3; Platforms | Platform 1 | 4 towards Huangcun (Nanheng) |
| L3; Platforms | Side platform, doors will open on the right |

== Exits ==
| Exit number | Exit location |
|---|---|
| Exit A | Keji Dadao |
| Exit B | Gangqian Dadaonan |
| Exit C | Gangqian Dadaonan |
| Exit D | Keji Dadao |
| Exit E | Keji Dadao |
| Exit F | Keji Dadao |
| Exit G | Gangqian Dadao |
