= Huangcun station =

Guangzhou Metro station

Coordinates: 23°07′56″N 113°24′26″E

Huangcun 黄村
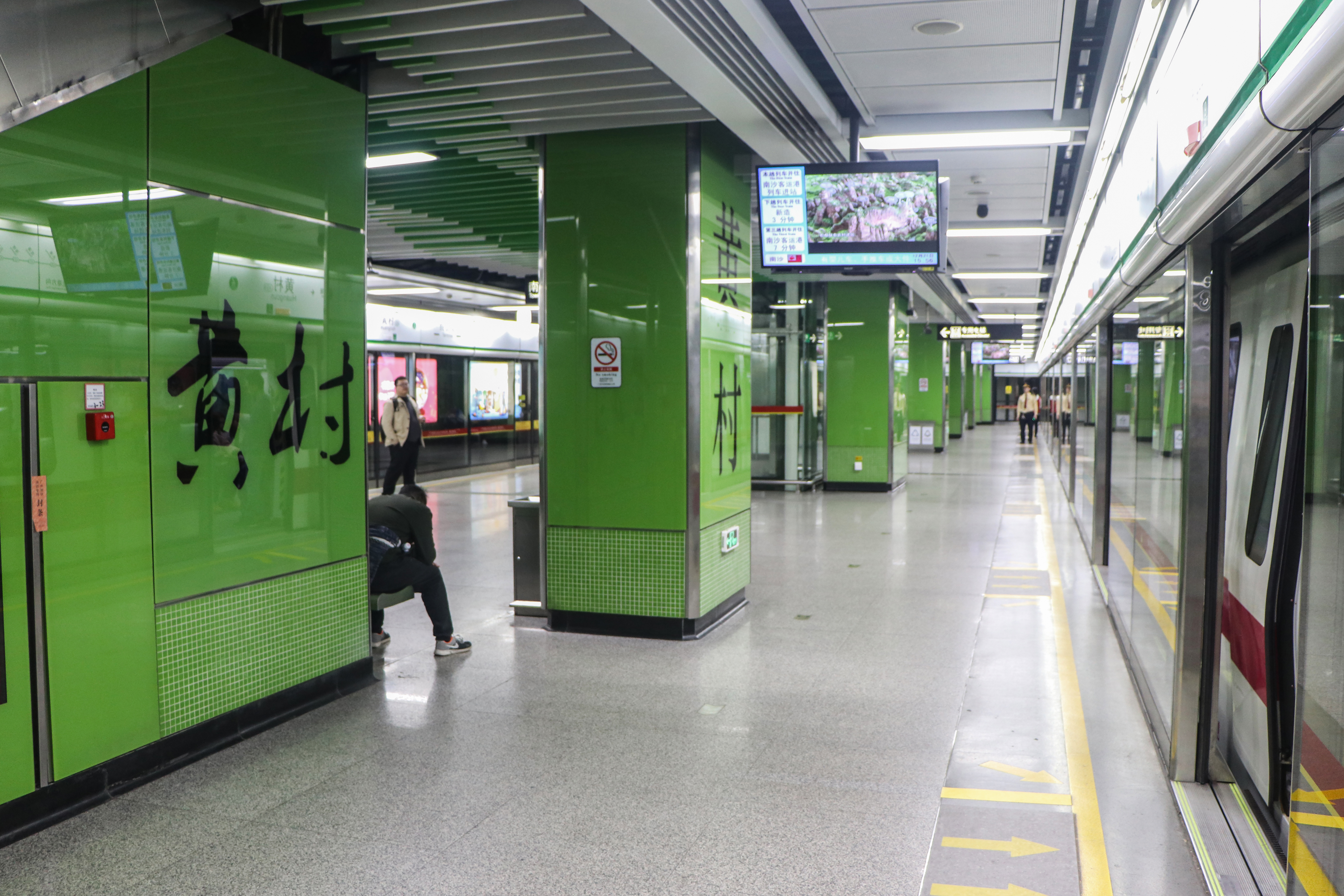
- Platform 2 (Line 4 originating platform)

Chinese name
- Chinese: 黃村站
Transcriptions
Standard Mandarin
- Hanyu Pinyin: Huángcūn Zhàn
Yue: Cantonese
- Yale Romanization: Wòhngchyūn Jaahm
- Jyutping: Wong^{4}cyun^{1} Zaam^{6}
- Hong Kong Romanization: Wong Tsuen station

General information
- Location: Tianhe District, Guangzhou, Guangdong; China
- Operated by: Guangzhou Metro Co. Ltd.
- Lines: Line 4 Line 21
- Platforms: 5 (2 island platforms and 1 side platform)
- Tracks: 4
- Connections: Tianhe East railway station

Construction
- Structure type: Underground
- Accessible: Yes

Other information
- Station code: 424 2104

History
- Opened: 25 September 2010; 15 years ago (Line 4); 20 December 2019; 6 years ago (Line 21)

Services
Preceding station	Guangzhou Metro	Following station
Terminus	Line 4	Chebei towards Nansha Passenger Port
Tangdong towards Tianhe Park	Line 21	Daguannanlu towards Zengcheng Square
Tangdong towards Tianhe Park	Line 21 Express	Tianhe Smart City towards Zengcheng Square
Location

Huangcun station (Chinese: 黄村站; Cantonese Yale: Wòhngchyūn Jaahm), formerly Olympic Sports Center station (奥林匹克中心站; Oulàhmpāthāk Jūngsām Jaahm) when planning, is an interchange station between Line 4 and Line 21 of the Guangzhou Metro, and also the northern terminus of Line 4. It is located at the underground outside Guangdong Olympic Stadium in Huangcun Subdistrict (黄村街道), Tianhe District. It started operation on 25 September 2010. Line 4 linking the Asian Games New Town outside Haibang Station with Guangdong Olympic Stadium plays a major role in carrying passengers during the Guangzhou Asian Games. The station became a transfer station with Line 21 on 20 December 2019. It is located near the Tianhe East railway station.

== Station layout ==
G	-	Exits A, B, D, E, F, H
L1; Concourse	Lobby	Ticket Machines, Customer Service, Shops, Police Station, Safety Facilities
L2; Platforms	Platform 4	21 towards Tianhe Park (Tangdong)
L2; Platforms	Island platform, doors will open on the left
L2; Platforms	Platform 5	21 towards Zengcheng Square (Daguannanlu / express: Tianhe Smart City)
L2; Platforms	Side platform, doors will open on the right
L2; Platforms	Platform 3 ↑ Platform 2 ↓	4 towards Nansha Passenger Port (Chebei)
L2; Platforms	Island platform, doors will open on the left
L2; Platforms	Platform 1	4 termination platform

== Exits ==
Exit number	Exit location
Exit A	Daguan Nanlu
Exit B	Daguan Nanlu
Exit D	Huanchang Lu
Exit E	Huanchang Lu
Exit F	Daguan Nanlu
Exit H	Daguan Nanlu

== Gallery ==
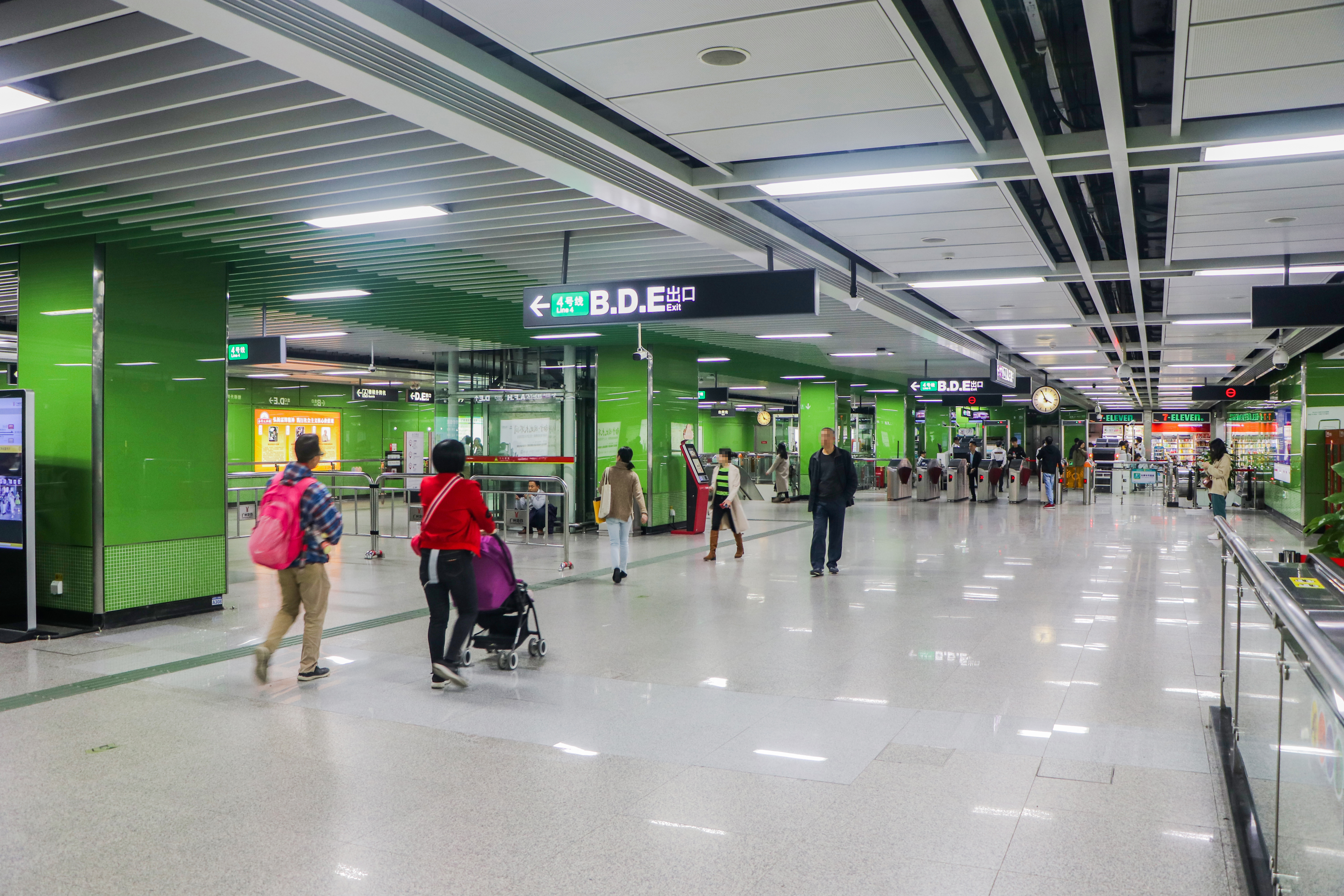
Line 4 concourse

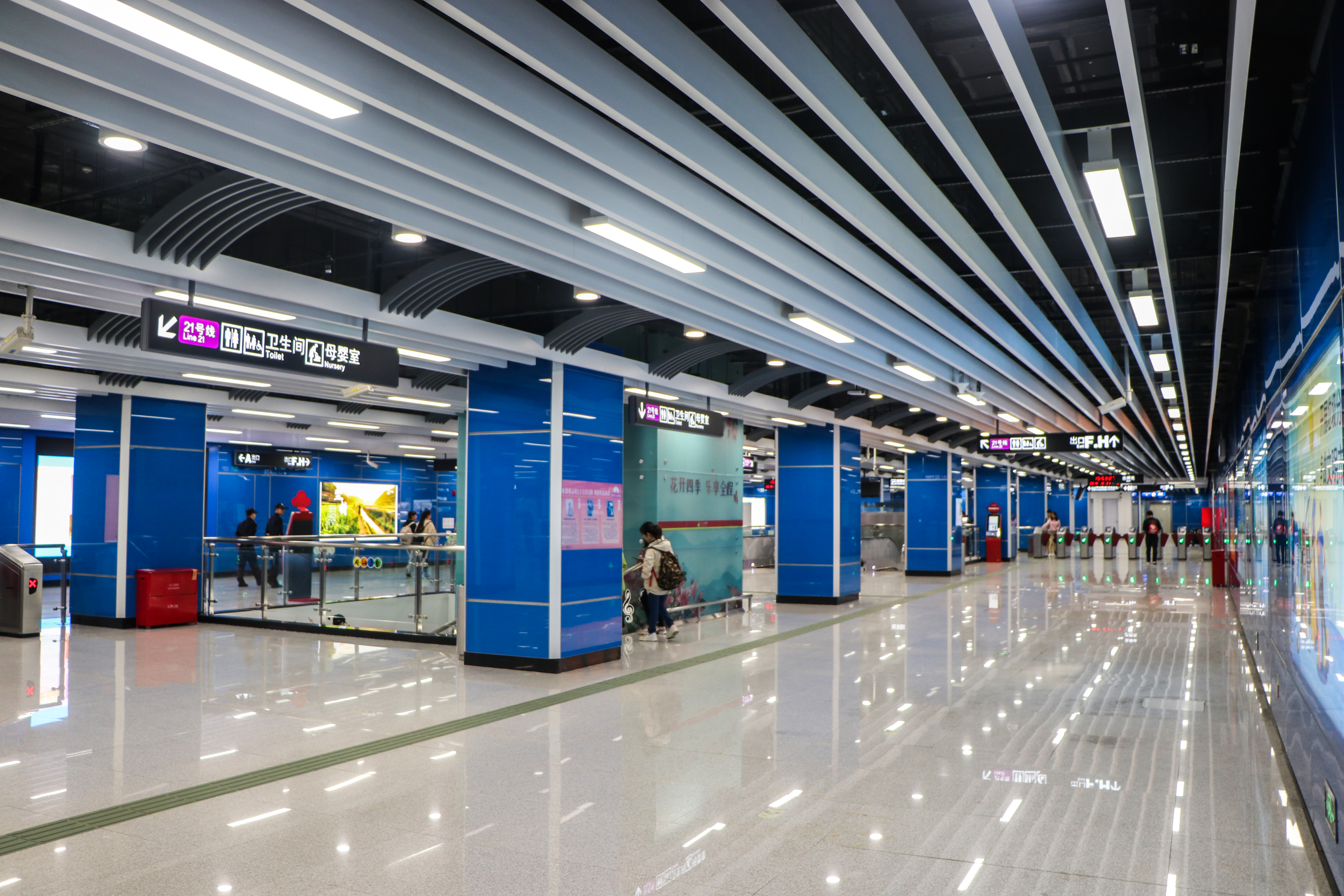
Line 21 Concourse

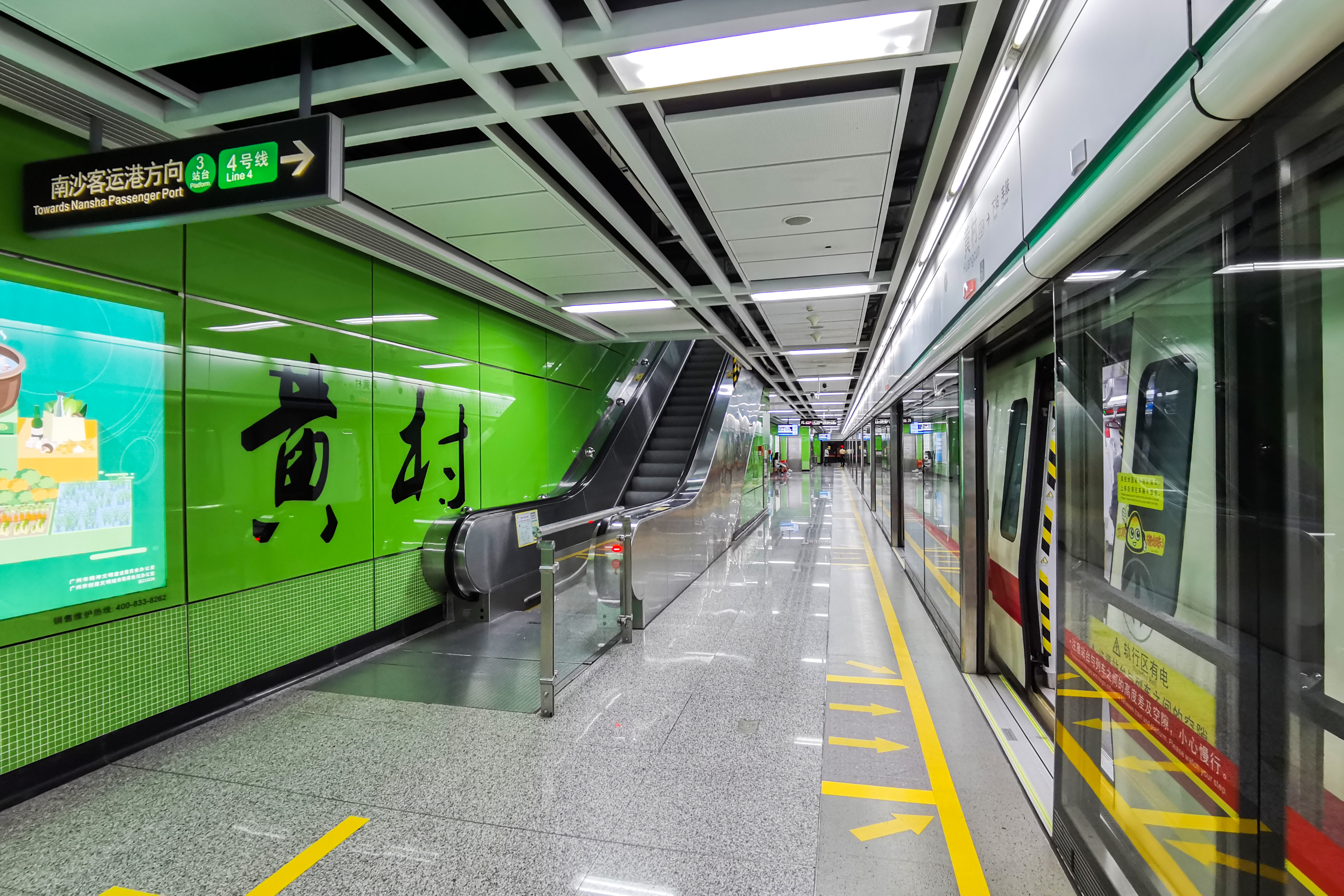
Platform 3 (Line 4 originating platform)

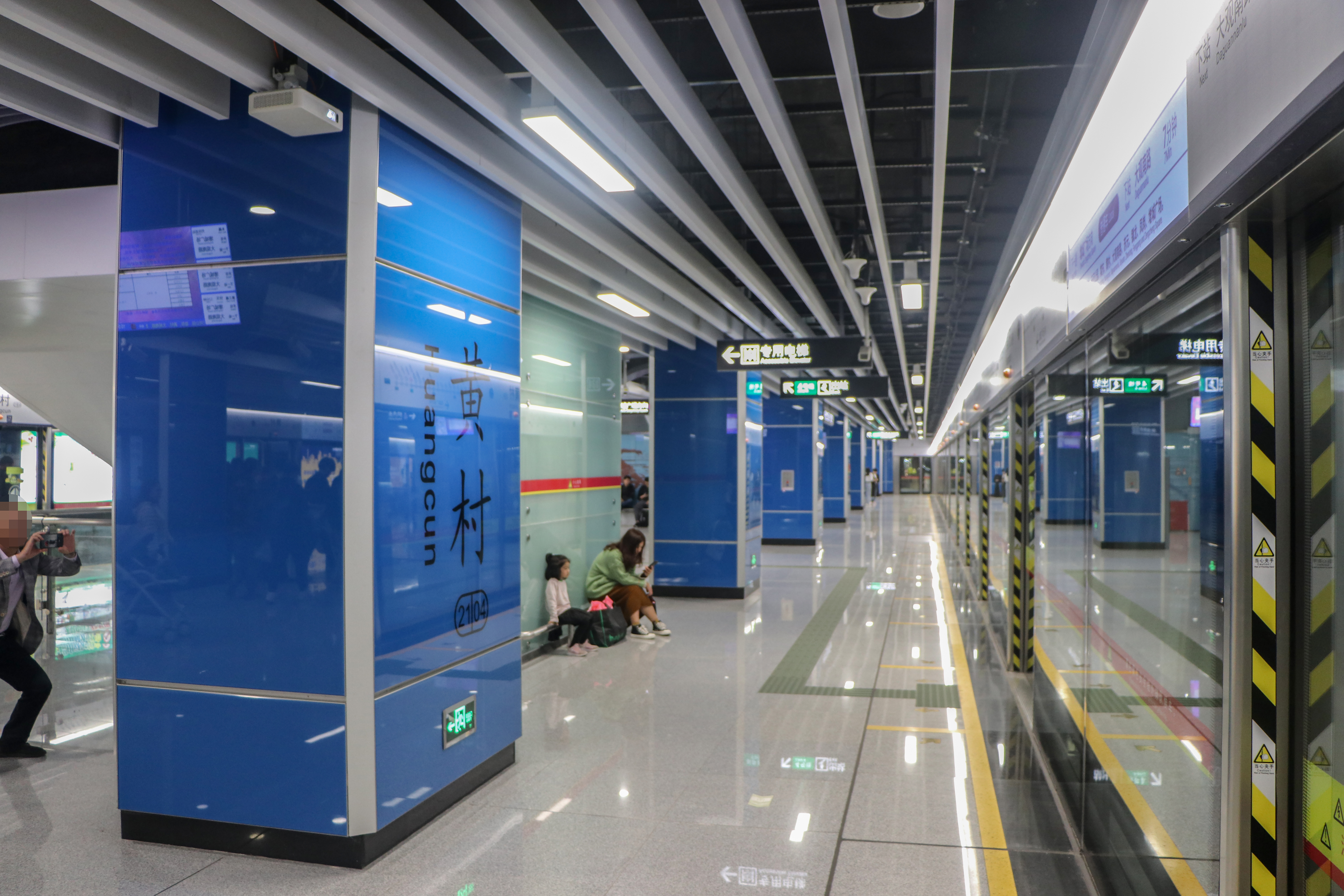
Platform 4 (Line 21 westbound platform)

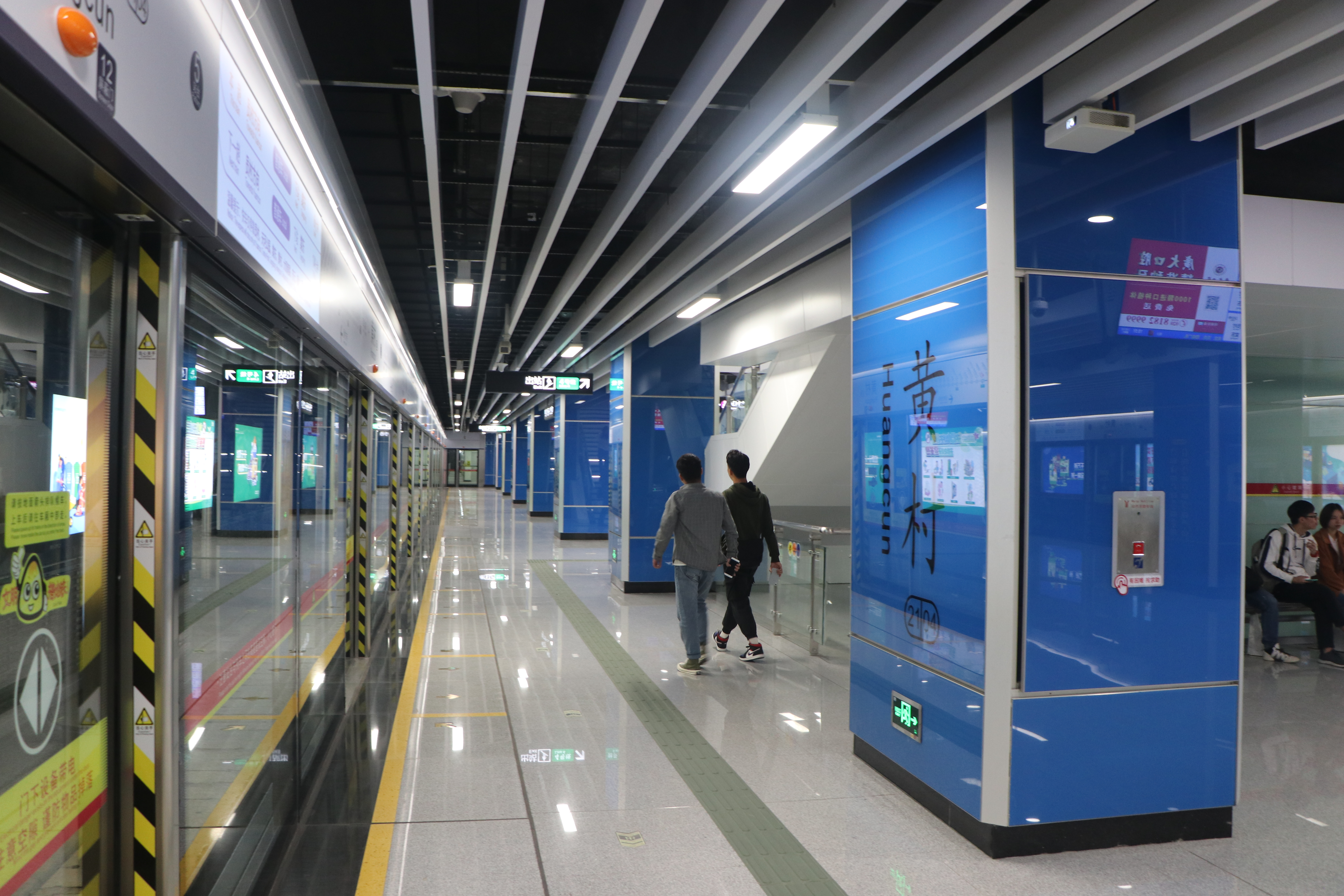
Platform 5 (Line 21 eastbound platform)

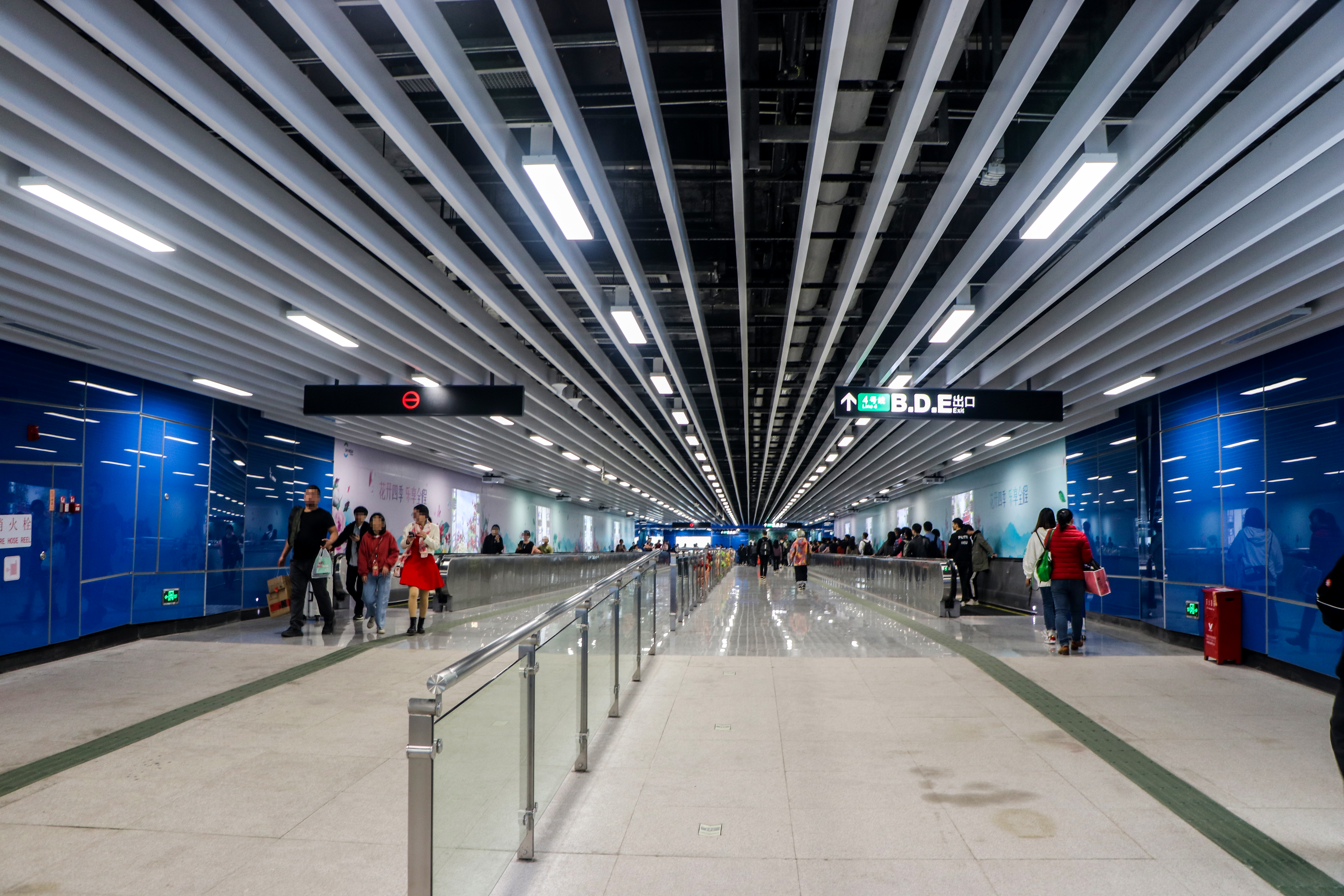
Transfer corridor
