= Shiqinan station =

Guangzhou Metro Line 3 station

Shiqinan 石碁南
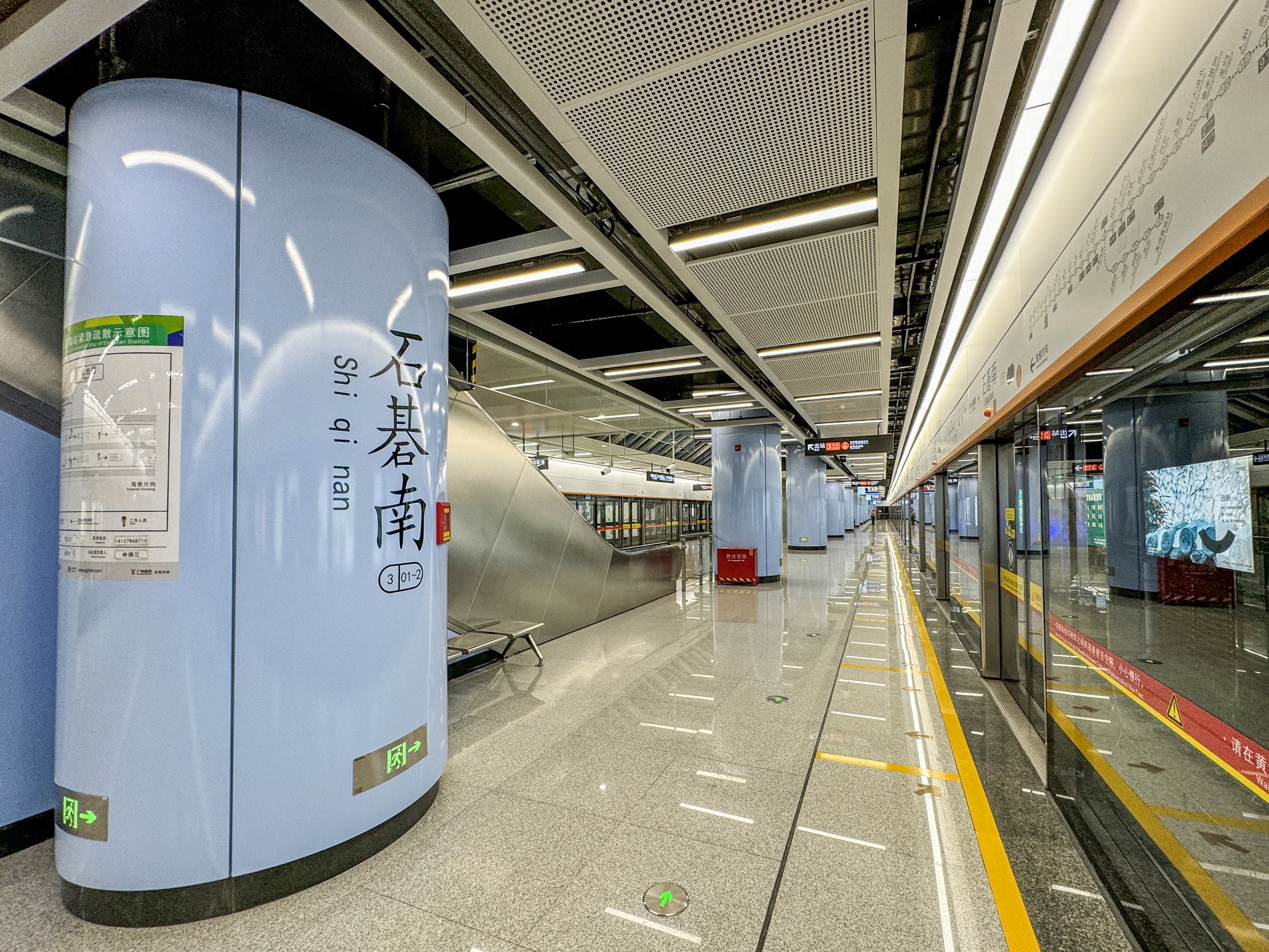
- Platform 1 (towards Haibang)

Chinese name
- Chinese: 石碁南站
Transcriptions
Standard Mandarin
- Hanyu Pinyin: Shíqínán Zhàn
Yue: Cantonese
- Yale Romanization: Sékgēinǎam Jaahm
- Jyutping: Sek^{6}gei^{1}naam^{4} Zaam^{6}
- Hong Kong Romanization: Shek Kei South station

General information
- Location: Intersection of Yayun Avenue (亚运大道) and Zhufen Road (朱份路), Shiqi; Panyu District, Guangzhou, Guangdong; China
- Coordinates: 22°56′25.64″N 113°26′2.70″E
- Operated by: Guangzhou Metro Co. Ltd.
- Line: Line 3
- Platforms: 4 (2 island platforms)
- Tracks: 3

Construction
- Structure type: Underground
- Accessible: Yes

Other information
- Station code: 301-2

History
- Opened: 1 November 2024 (20 months ago)
- Previous names: Guangzhou New Town West (广州新城西)

Services
Preceding station	Guangzhou Metro	Following station
Haichong Lu towards Haibang	Line 3	Bangjiang towards Airport North (Terminal 2) or Tianhe Coach Terminal
Location

Shiqinan Station (Chinese: 石碁南站; pinyin: Shíqínán Zhàn; Cantonese Yale: Sékgēinǎam Jaahm) is a station of Line 3 of the Guangzhou Metro. It started operations on 1 November 2024, along with the rest of the eastern extension of Line 3. It is located at the underground of the junction of Yayun Avenue and Zhufen Road, in Shiqi, Panyu District, Guangzhou. The station has a middle track used for train dispatches from and withdrawals to the nearby Guangzhou New Town Depot.

== Station layout ==
G	Street level	Exits A-D
L1; Concourse	Lobby	Ticket Machines, Customer Service, Shops, Police Station, Safety Facilities
L2; Platforms	Platform 1	3 towards Haibang (Haichong Lu)
L2; Platforms	Island platform, doors will open on the left (Toilets, Nursery)
L2; Platforms		3 Reserved platform, not in use
L2; Platforms	Island platform, doors will open on the left (Toilets, Nursery)
L2; Platforms	Platform 2	3 towards Tianhe Coach Terminal or Airport North (Terminal 2) (Bangjiang)

=== Entrances/exits ===
The station has four entrances/exits, one on each corner of the intersection between Yayun Avenue and Zhufen Road:

Exit	Corner	Opened
A	Southwest	1 November 2024
B	Southeast	1 November 2024
C	Northeast	30 April 2025
D	Northwest	11 January 2025

Exit B is equipped with an elevator. Exits C and D on the north side of Yayun Avenue were affected by construction of the expedited renovation work, and the opening was postponed to 30 April and 11 January 2025 respectively.

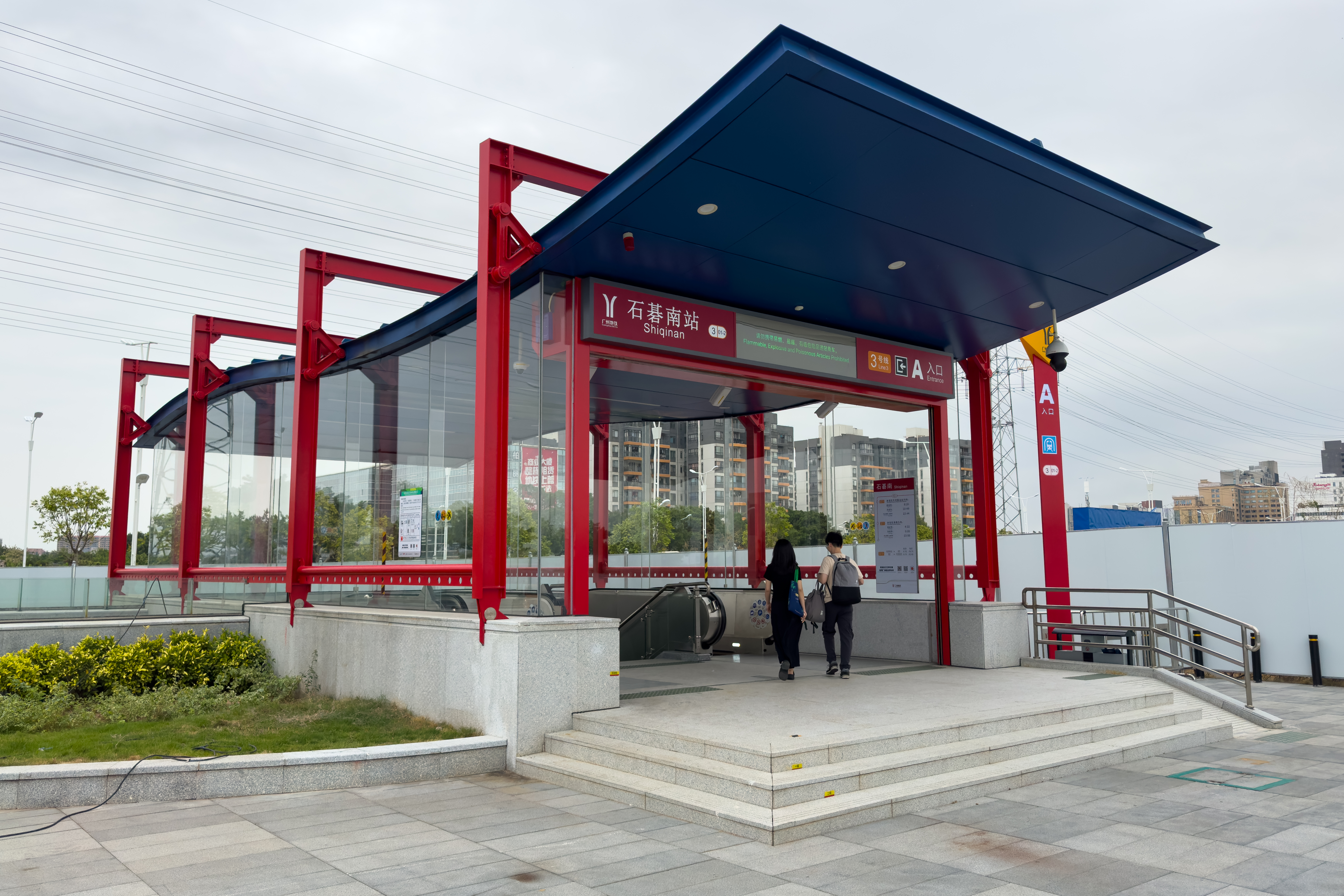
Entrance A

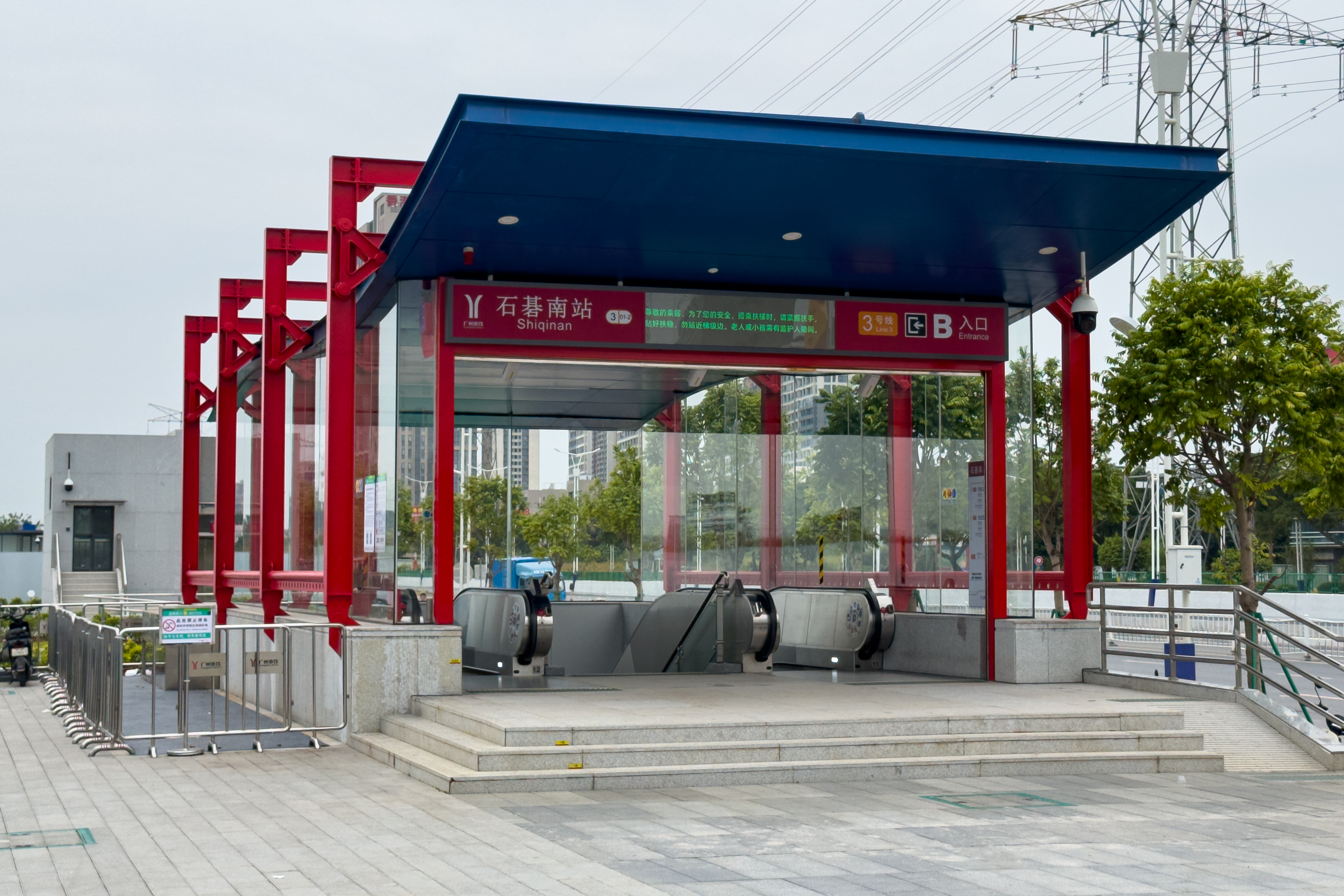
Entrance B

== Gallery ==
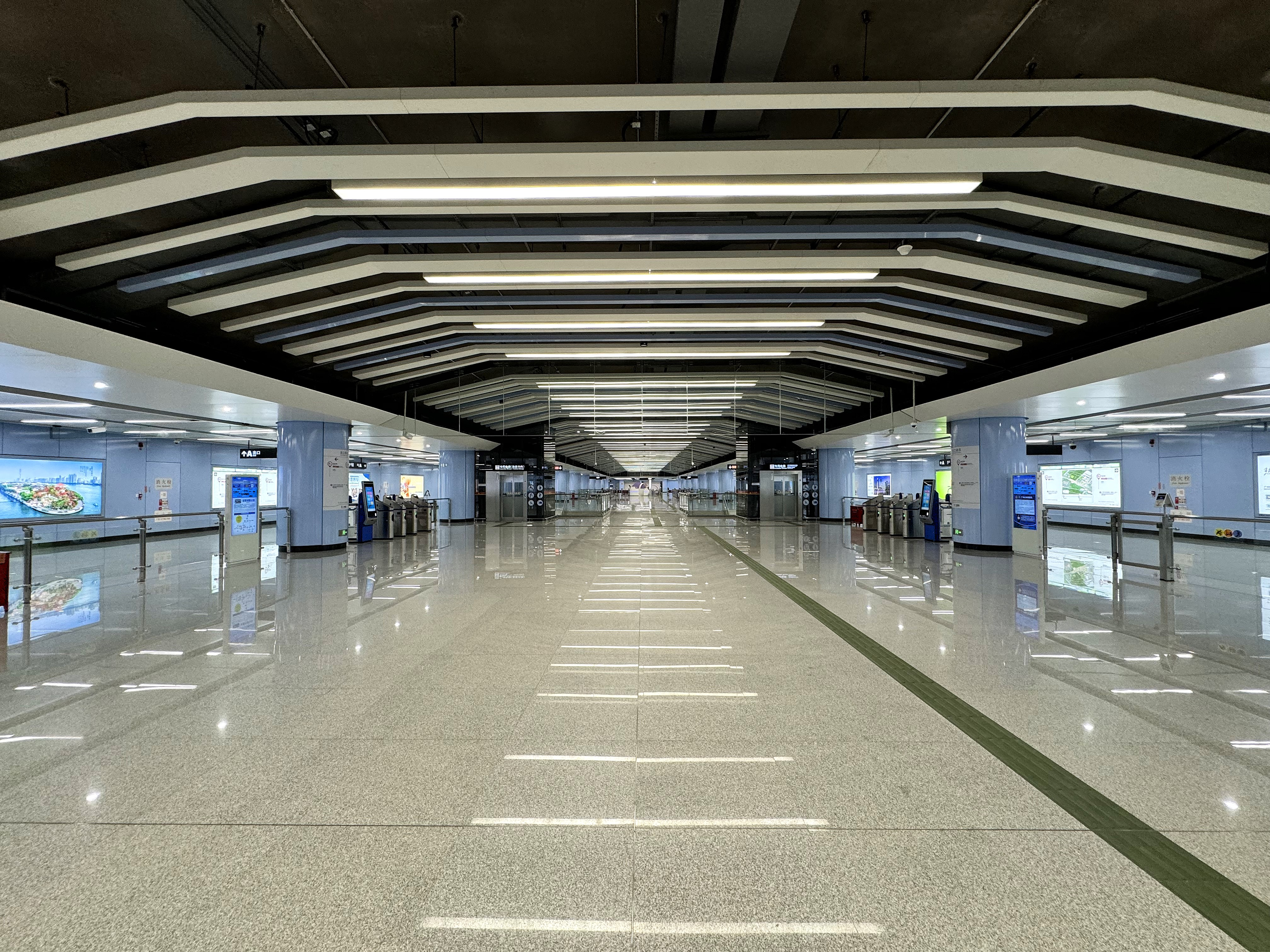
Concourse

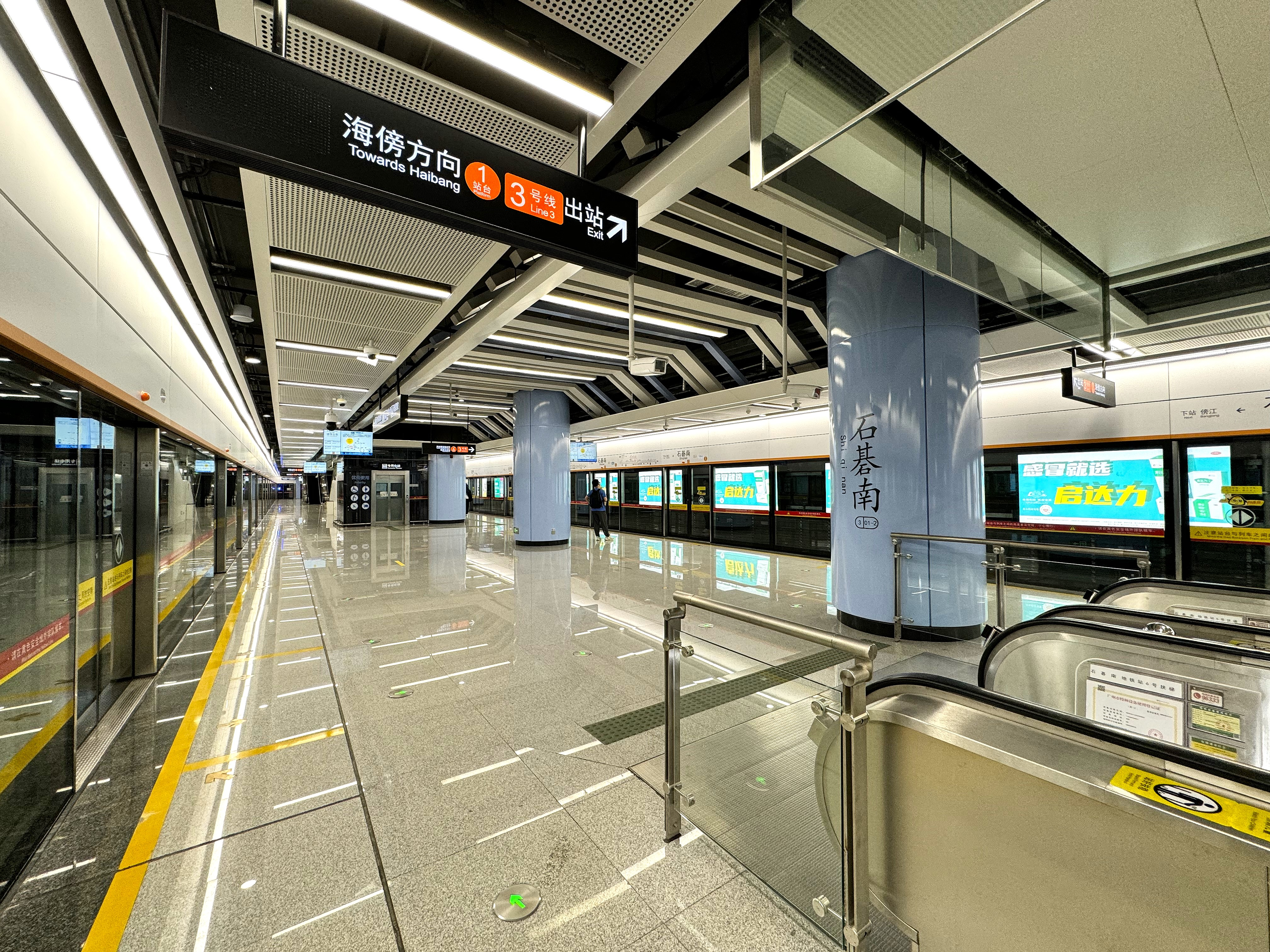
Platform 2 (towards Airport North)

== History ==
The station first appeared in the 2003 plan of Guangzhou Urban Rail Transit Plan, when Line 3 planned to travel from Panyu Square to the east to Guangzhou New Town in the direction of Nansha and build a station near Zhufen Road intersection with Yayun (Asian Games) Boulevard on the way. Subsequently, as part of the East Extension of Line 3, the station was approved by the National Development and Reform Commission in late March 2017 and plans were approved in early January 2018.

The construction of the station started on 31 July 2020, and construction of the main enclosure structure was topped out in September 2022.

The station was known as Guangzhou New Town West in the planning and construction stage. In June 2023, Guangzhou Metro Group plans to name the station Shiqinan (Shiqi South). During the publicity period, the naming of "Shi Qi Nan" was rarely used by Guangzhou citizens, and some commentators believed that according to the "Naming Rules for Guangzhou Metro Stations", "Qianfeng" was more suitable than "Shi Qi Nan". However, the authorities did not adopt the proposal because the station was far away from Qianfeng Road, and "Shiqinan" was officially approved in October of the same year.

On 31 May 2024, the station completed the "three rights" transfer. On 1 November 2024, the eastern extension of Line 3 was put into operation, along with the station.
