= Dongchong =

Dongchong (traditional Chinese: 東涌; simplified Chinese: 东涌; pinyin: Dōngchōng; Jyutping: Dung^{1}cung^{1}; Cantonese Yale: Dūngchūng) may refer to:

- Tung Chung, in the north of Lantau Island, Hong Kong
- Tung Chung line of the Hong Kong MTR
  - Tung Chung station on said line
- Dongchong, Guangzhou, town in and subdivision of Nansha District, Guangzhou, Guangdong
  - Dongchong station on Guangzhou Metro Line 4
- Dongchong, Shanwei, town in and subdivision of Chengqu, Shanwei, Guangdong
