= Bangjiang station =

Guangzhou Metro Line 3 station

Bangjiang 傍江
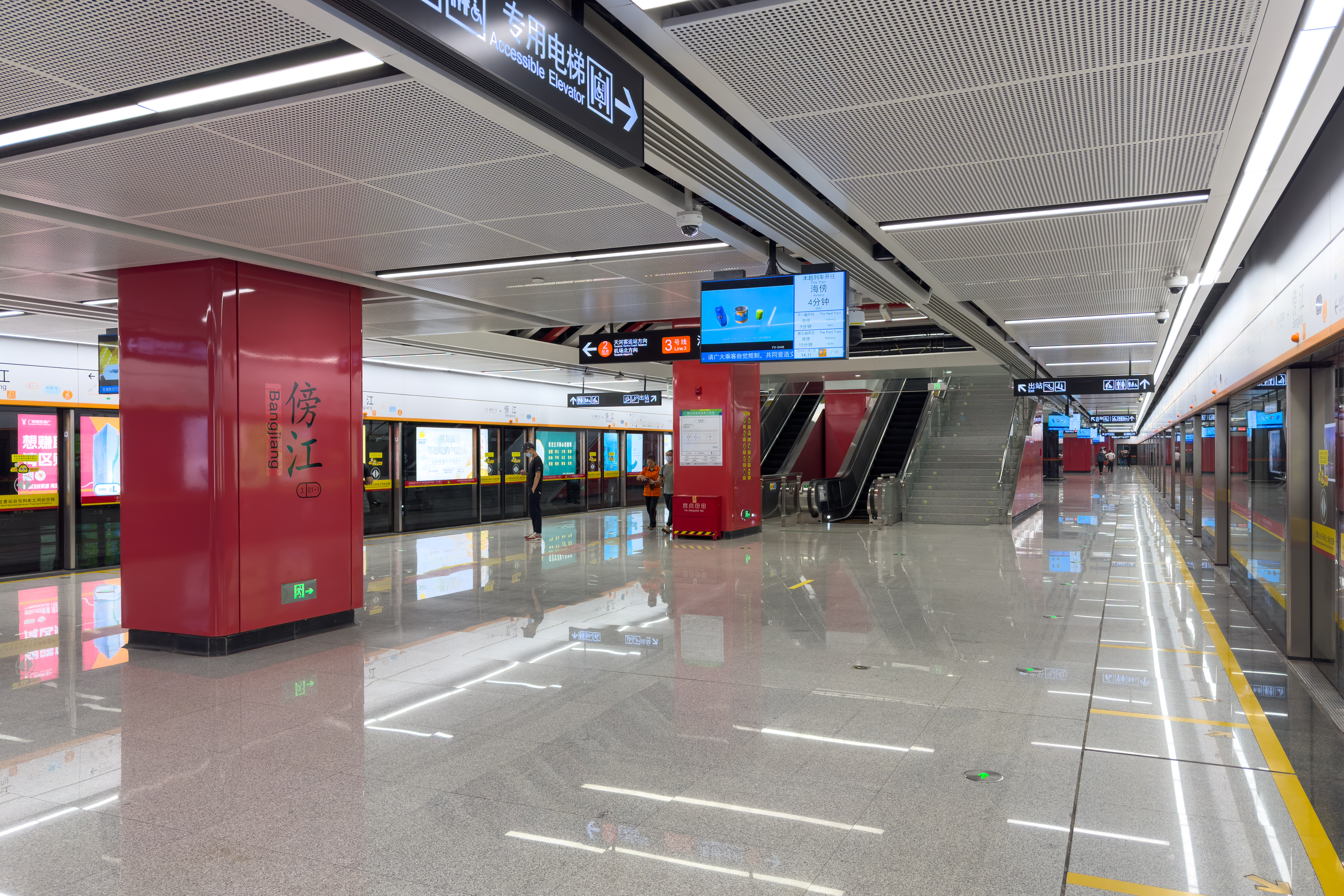
- Platform

Chinese name
- Chinese: 傍江站
Transcriptions
Standard Mandarin
- Hanyu Pinyin: Bàngjiāng Zhàn
Yue: Cantonese
- Yale Romanization: Bohnggōng Jaahm
- Jyutping: Bong^{6}gong^{1} Zaam^{6}
- Hong Kong Romanization: Pong Kong station

General information
- Location: West side of intersection of Yayun Boulevard (亚运大道) and Bangyan Road (傍雁路), Dalong Subdistrict; Panyu District, Guangzhou, Guangdong; China
- Coordinates: 22°56′21.73″N 113°24′17.35″E
- Operated by: Guangzhou Metro Co. Ltd.
- Line: Line 3
- Platforms: 2 (1 island platform)
- Tracks: 2

Construction
- Structure type: Underground
- Accessible: Yes

Other information
- Station code: 301-1

History
- Opened: 1 November 2024 (18 months ago)
- Previous names: Panyu Coach Terminal (番禺客运站)

Services
Preceding station	Guangzhou Metro	Following station
Shiqinan towards Haibang	Line 3	Panyu Square towards Airport North (Terminal 2) or Tianhe Coach Terminal
Location

Bangjiang Station (Chinese: 傍江站; pinyin: Bàngjiāng Zhàn; Cantonese Yale: Bohnggōng Jaahm) is a station of Line 3 of the Guangzhou Metro. It started operations on 1 November 2024, along with the rest of the eastern extension of Line 3. It is located at the underground of the junction of Yayun Boulevard and Bangyan Road, in Panyu District, Guangzhou.

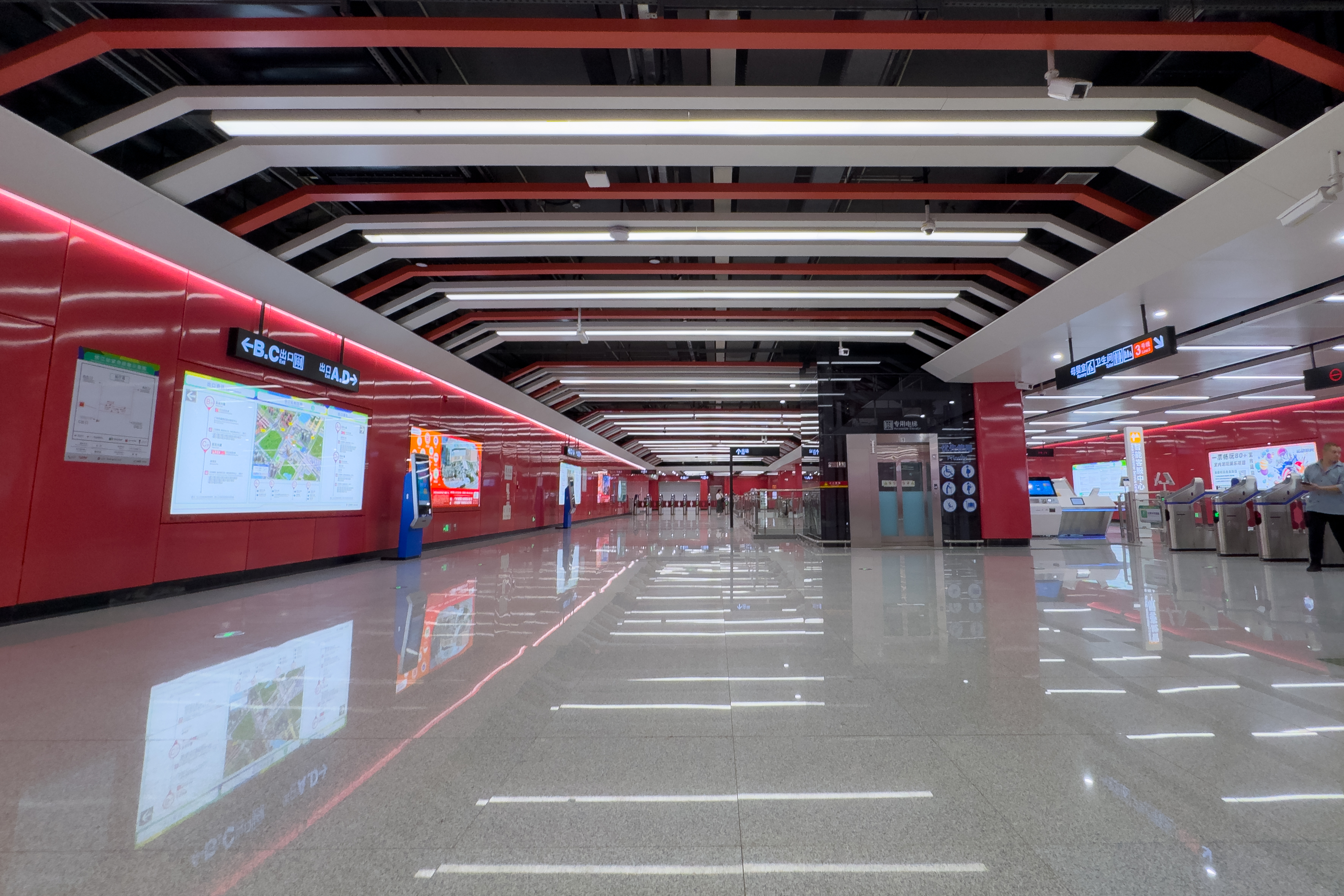
Concourse

== Station layout ==
G	Street level	Exits A-D
L1; Concourse	Lobby	Ticket Machines, Customer Service, Shops, Police Station, Safety Facilities
L2; Platforms	Platform 1	3 towards Haibang (Shiqinan)
L2; Platforms	Island platform, doors will open on the left (Toilets, Nursery)
L2; Platforms	Platform 2	3 towards Tianhe Coach Terminal or Airport North (Terminal 2) (Panyu Square)

=== Entrances/exits ===
The station has 4 points of entry/exit, with Exit C being accessible via elevator.

- A: Yayun Boulevard
- B: Yayun Boulevard
- C: Yayun Boulevard
- D: Yayun Boulevard
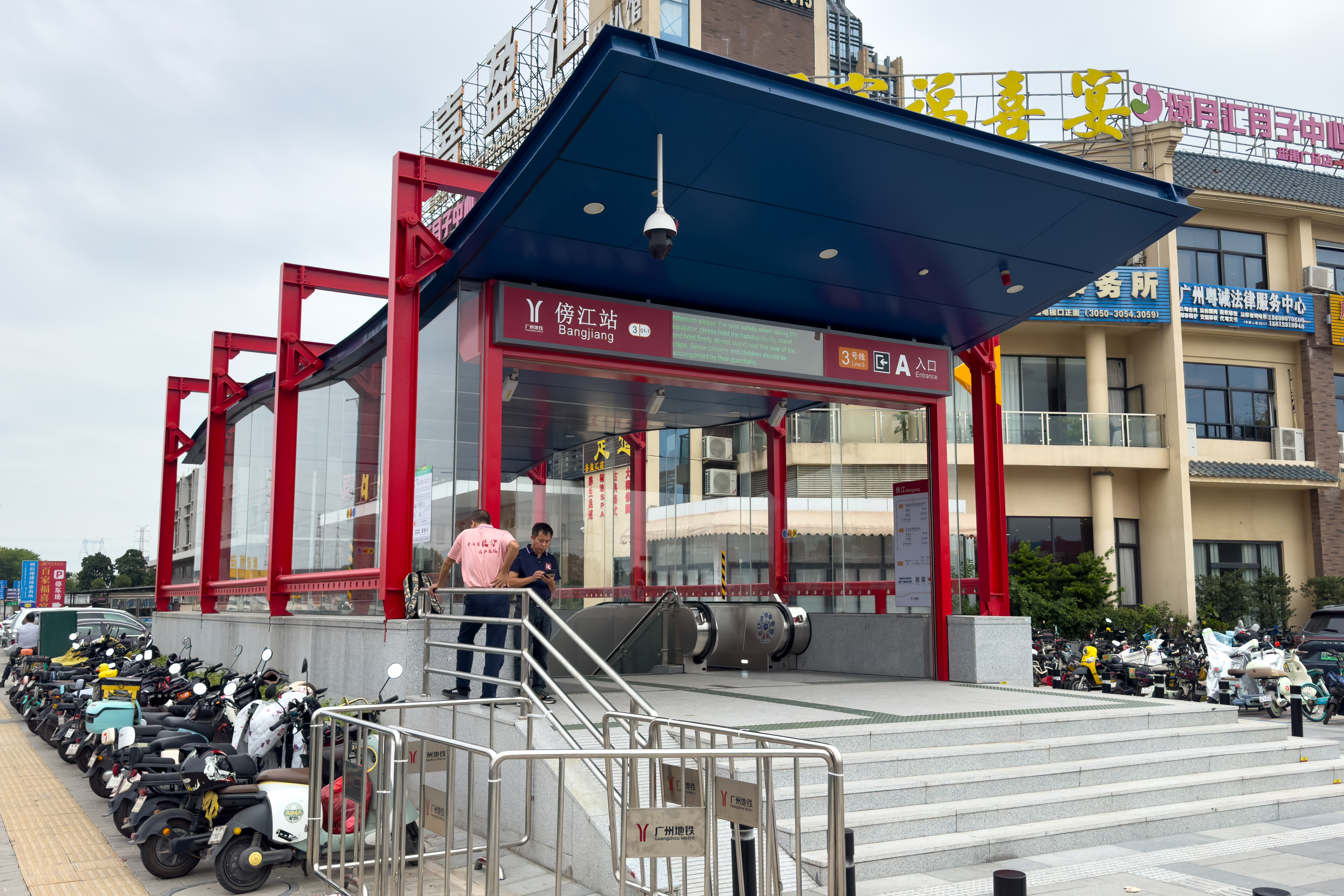
Entrance A

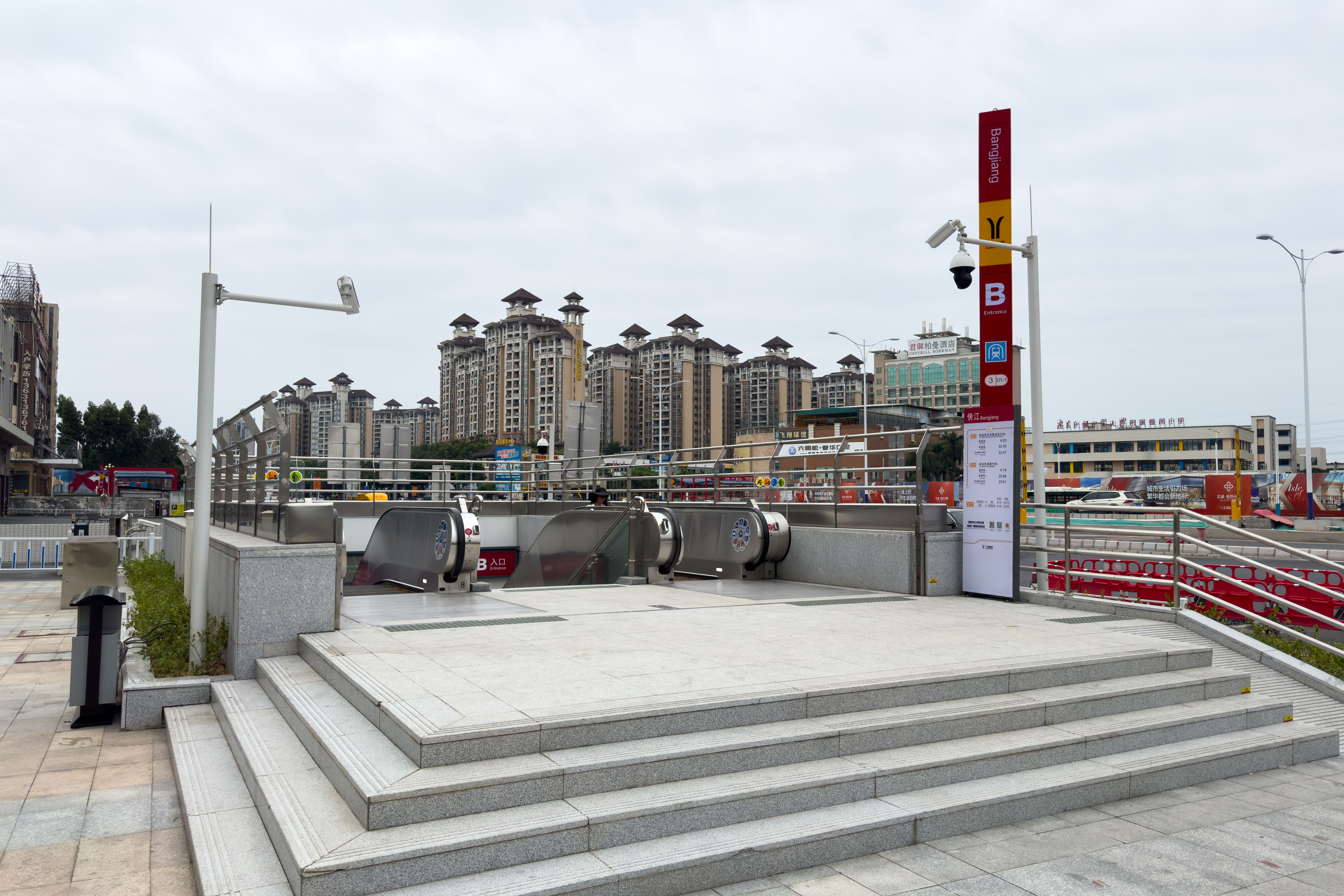
Entrance B

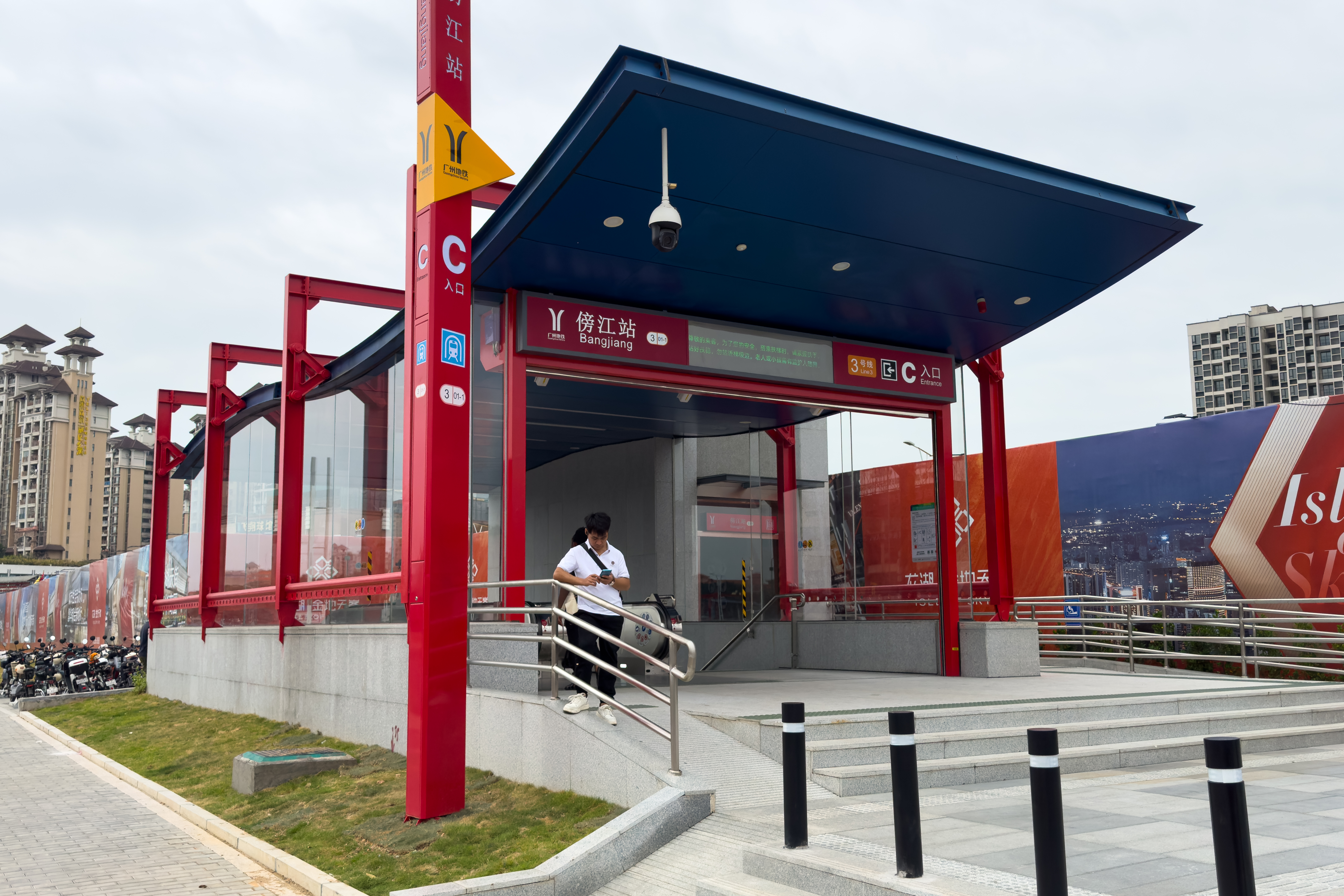
Entrance C

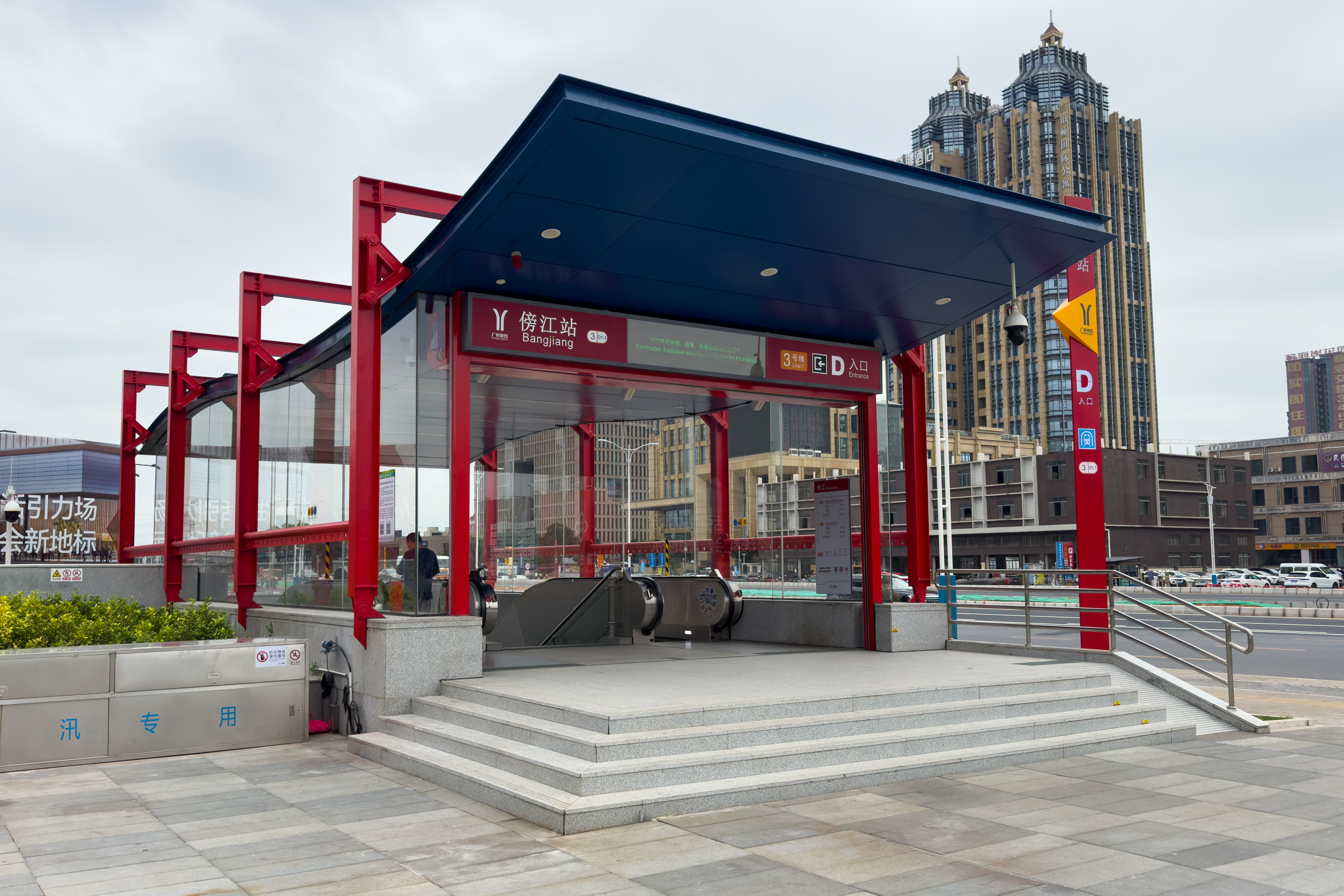
Entrance D

== History ==
The station first appeared in the 2003 plan of Guangzhou Urban Rail Transit Plan, when Line 3 planned to travel from Panyu Square to the east to Guangzhou New Town in the direction of Nansha and build a station near Panyu Coach Terminal on the way. Subsequently, as part of the East Extension of Line 3, the station was approved by the National Development and Reform Commission in late March 2017 and plans were approved in early January 2018.

The construction of the station started on 11 October 2019, and construction of the main enclosure structure was completed in March 2020. On November 23 of the same year, the topping out was completed, becoming the first station with the main structure topped out on the eastern extension of Line 3.

Due to the proximity of the station at the time to Panyu Coach Terminal, the station was therefore named Panyu Coach Terminal during the planning and construction period. However, the coach terminal was closed on 1 August 2019 and demolished in 2020, which is no longer suitable as a station name, so it was proposed to name it as Bangjiang Station in June 2023 based on the village where the station is located. During the publicity period, some members of the public thought that the Cantonese pronunciation of the station was similar to "bladder" (Yue pinyin: pong^{4} gwong^{1}), and the authorities responded that the village was named after the mountain and river, so the correct pronunciation in Cantonese should be "pound river" (Yue pinyin: bong^{6} gong^{1}), and did not follow the recommendations. Finally, the name of the station was officially approved in October of the same year.

On 1 June 2024, the station completed the "three rights" transfer. On 1 November 2024, the eastern extension of Line 3 was put into operation, along with the station.
