= Dichong station =

Guangzhou Metro station

Coordinates: 22°55′10″N 113°29′06″E

Dichong 低涌
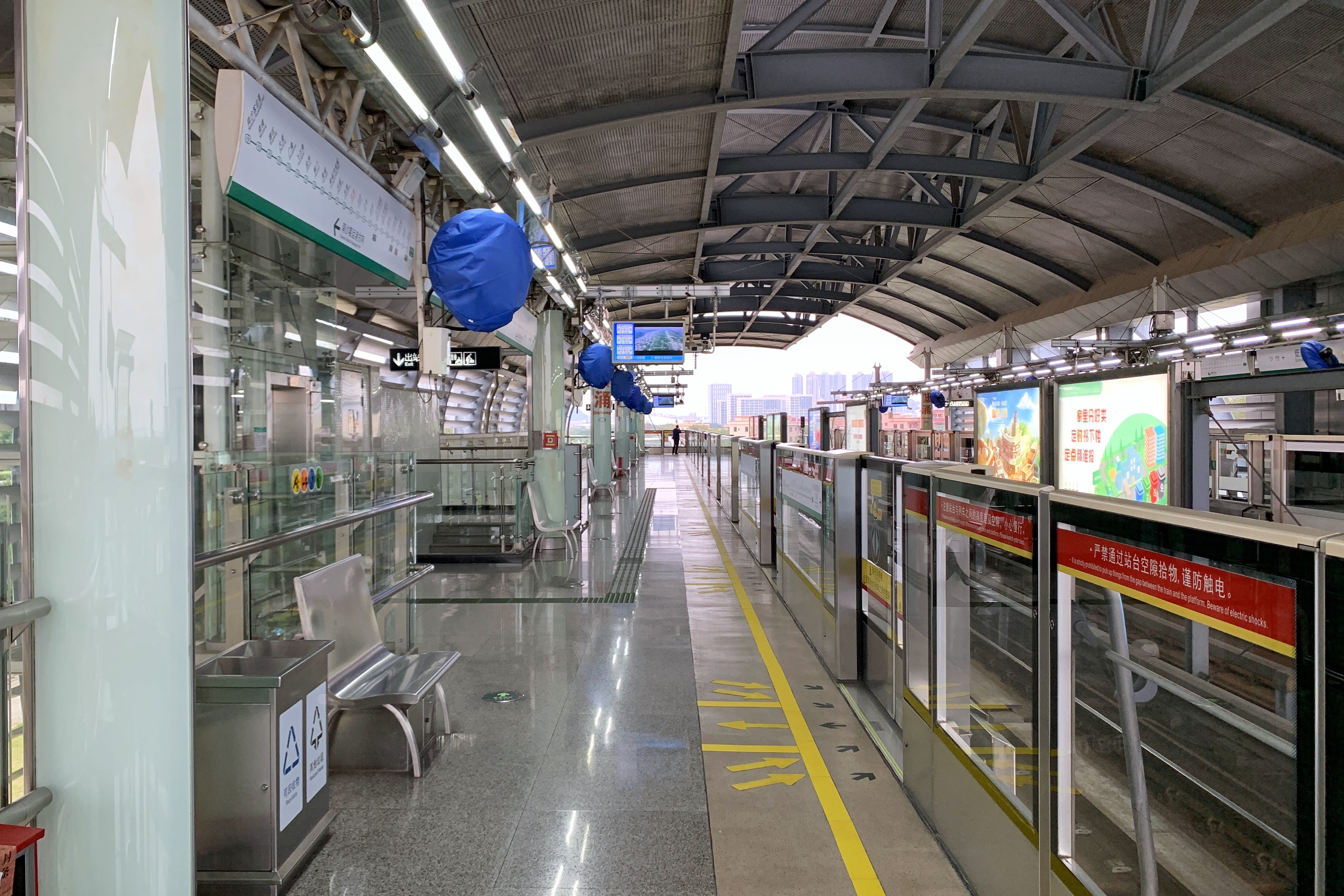
- Platform 2

Chinese name
- Chinese: 低涌站
Transcriptions
Standard Mandarin
- Hanyu Pinyin: Dīchōng Zhàn
Yue: Cantonese
- Yale Romanization: Dāichūng Jaahm
- Jyutping: Dai^{1}cung^{1} Zaam^{6}
- Hong Kong Romanization: Tai Chung station

General information
- Location: Panyu District, Guangzhou, Guangdong; China
- Operated by: Guangzhou Metro Co. Ltd.
- Line: Line 4
- Platforms: 2 (2 side platforms)

Construction
- Structure type: Elevated

Other information
- Station code: 413

History
- Opened: 30 December 2006; 19 years ago

Services
Preceding station	Guangzhou Metro	Following station
Haibang towards Huangcun	Line 4	Dongchong towards Nansha Passenger Port
Location

Dichong Station (Chinese: 低涌站; Cantonese Yale: Dāichūng Jaahm) is an elevated station of Line 4 of the Guangzhou Metro. It started operations on 30 December 2006. It is located at the junction of Nande Road and Qianqing Road in Shiqi Town (石碁镇), Panyu District.

== Station layout ==
F2; Platforms	Side platform, doors will open on the right
F2; Platforms	Platform 2	4 towards Nansha Passenger Port (Dongchong)
F2; Platforms	Platform 1	4 towards Huangcun (Haibang)
F2; Platforms	Side platform, doors will open on the right
G Concourse	Lobby	Customer Service, Vending machines, ATMs, Toilet, Payphones

== Exits ==
Exit number	Exit location
Exit A	Dichongcun
Exit B	Dichongcun
