= Haichong Lu station =

Guangzhou Metro Line 3 station

Haichong Lu 海涌路
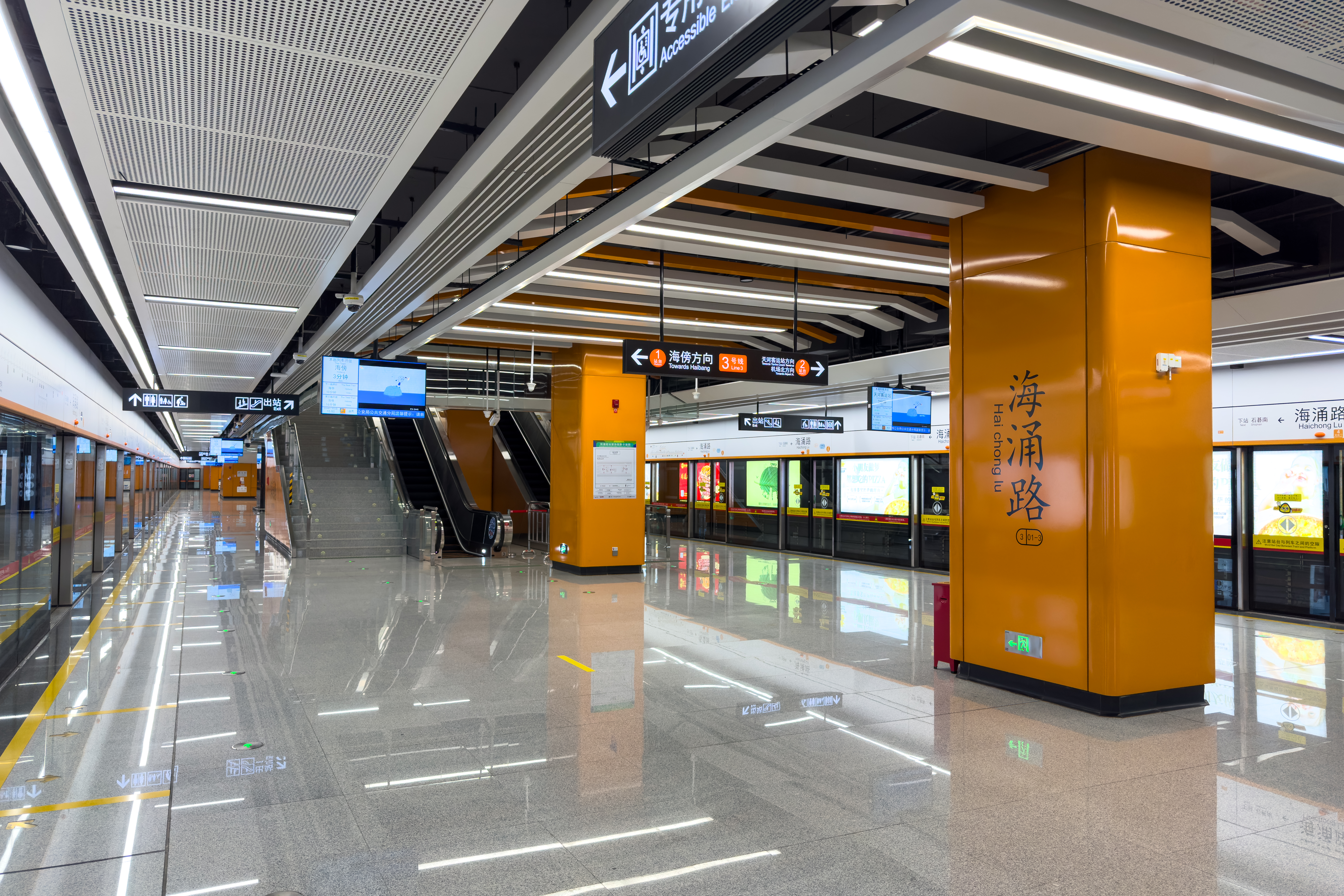
- Platform

Chinese name
- Chinese: 海涌路站
Transcriptions
Standard Mandarin
- Hanyu Pinyin: Hǎichōnglù Zhàn
Yue: Cantonese
- Yale Romanization: Hóichūnglǒu Jaahm
- Jyutping: Hoi^{2}chung^{1}lou^{6} Zaam^{6}
- Hong Kong Romanization: Hoi Chung Road station

General information
- Location: Intersection of Yayun Avenue (亚运大道) and Haichong Road (海涌路), Shiqi; Panyu District, Guangzhou, Guangdong; China
- Coordinates: 22°56′40.45″N 113°27′7.96″E
- Operated by: Guangzhou Metro Co. Ltd.
- Line: Line 3
- Platforms: 2 (1 island platform)
- Tracks: 2

Construction
- Structure type: Underground
- Accessible: Yes

Other information
- Station code: 301-3

History
- Opened: 1 November 2024 (20 months ago)
- Previous names: Jinguang Dadao (金光大道)

Services
Preceding station	Guangzhou Metro	Following station
Haibang Terminus	Line 3	Shiqinan towards Airport North (Terminal 2) or Tianhe Coach Terminal
Location

Haichong Lu Station (Chinese: 海涌路站; pinyin: Hǎichōnglù Zhàn; Cantonese Yale: Hóichūnglǒu Jaahm) is a station of Line 3 of the Guangzhou Metro. It started operations on 1 November 2024, along with the rest of the eastern extension of Line 3. It is located at the underground of the junction of Yayun Avenue and Haichong Road, in Shiqi, Panyu District, Guangzhou.

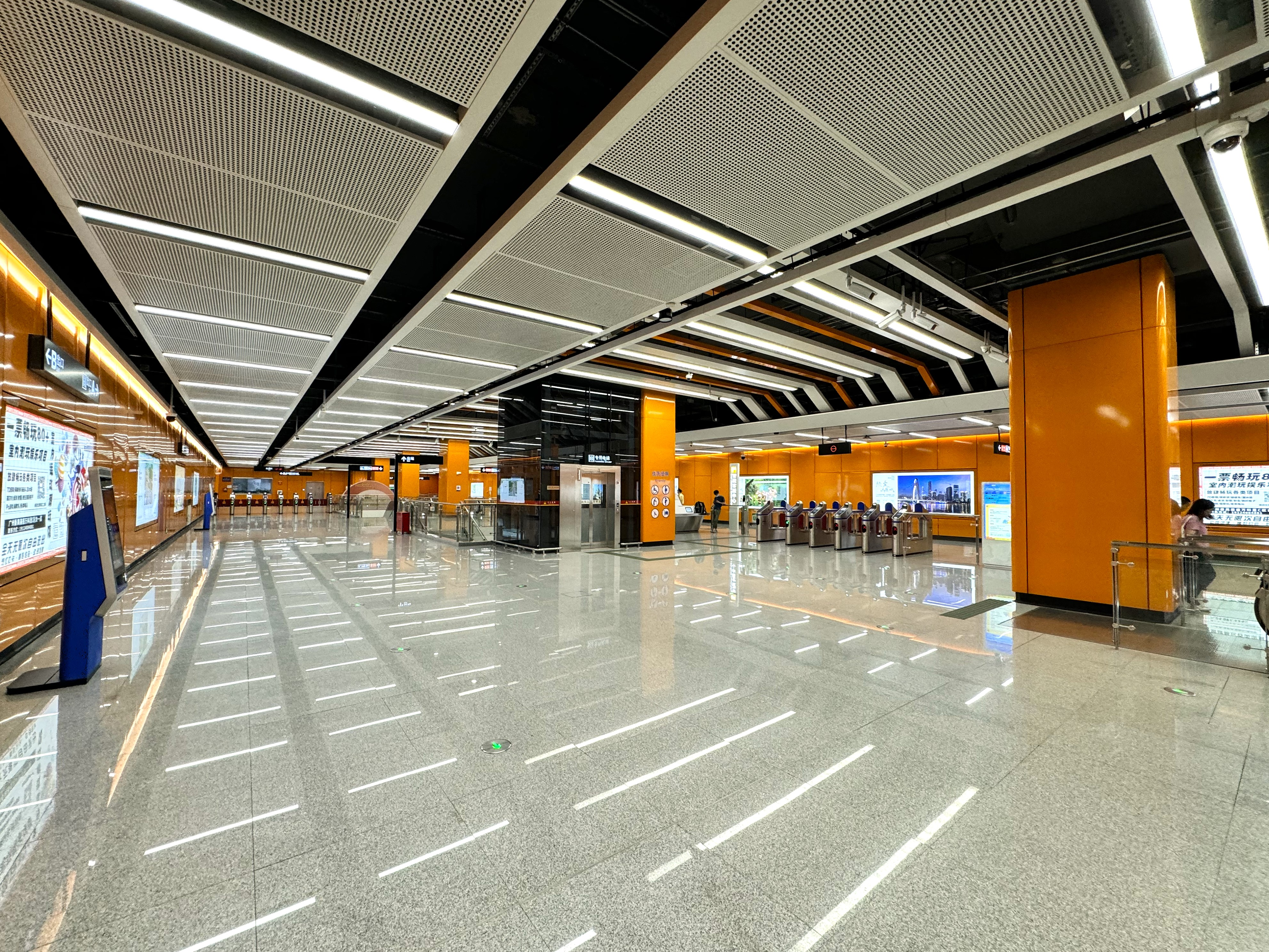
Concourse

== Station layout ==
G	Street level	Exits
L1; Concourse	Lobby	Ticket Machines, Customer Service, Shops, Police Station, Safety Facilities
L2; Platforms	Platform 1	3 towards Haibang (terminus)
L2; Platforms	Island platform, doors will open on the left (Toilets, Nursery)
L2; Platforms	Platform 2	3 towards Tianhe Coach Terminal or Airport North (Terminal 2) (Shiqinan)

=== Entrances/exits ===
The station has four entrances/exits, one on each corner of the intersection between Yayun Avenue and Haichong Road:

Exit	Corner	Opened
A	Southwest	1 November 2024
B	Southeast	1 November 2024
C	Northeast	29 December 2025
D	Northwest	22 June 2026

Exit A is equipped with an elevator. Exit C and D did not open with the station due to the ongoing construction work on Yayun Avenue at time of opening.

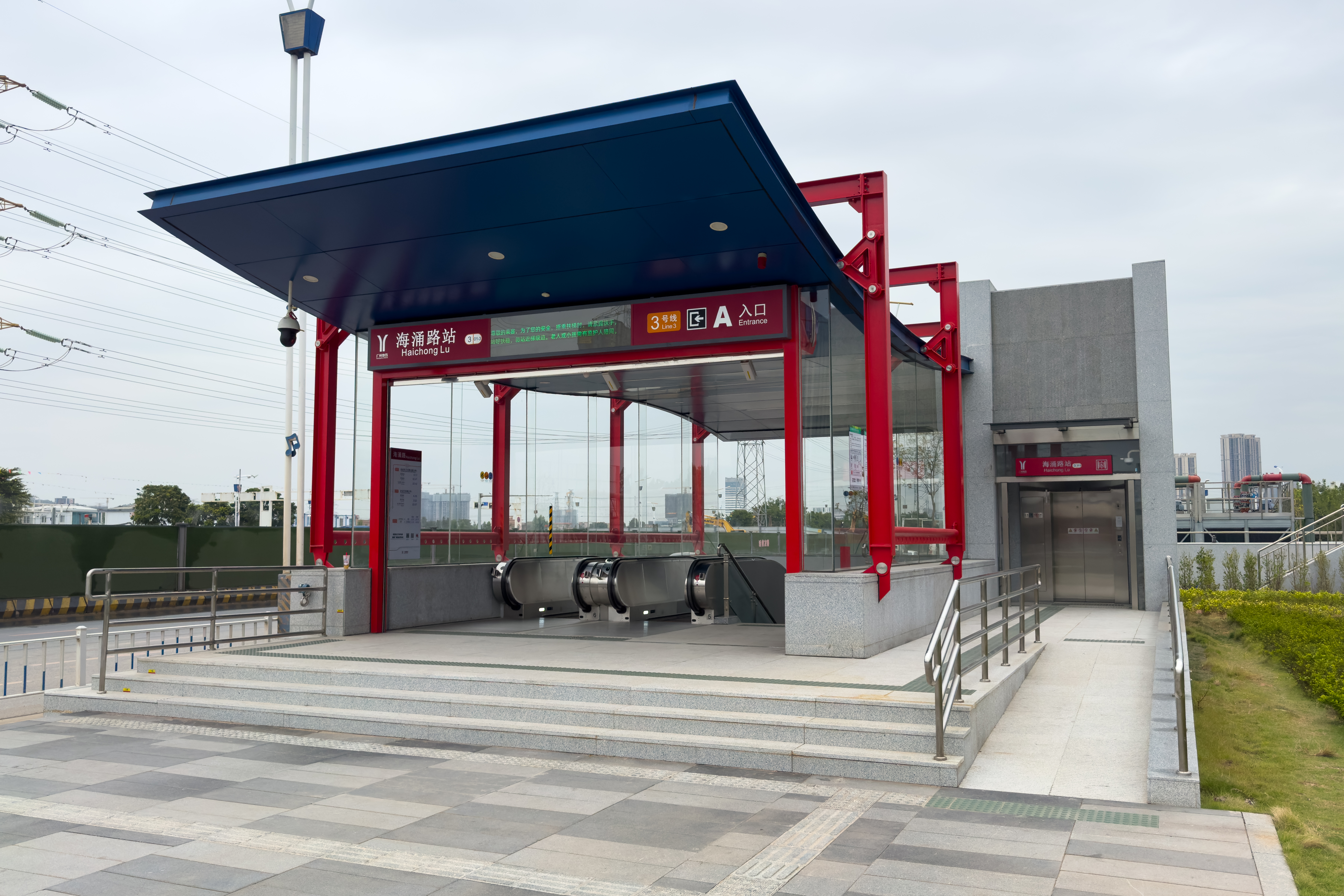
Entrance A

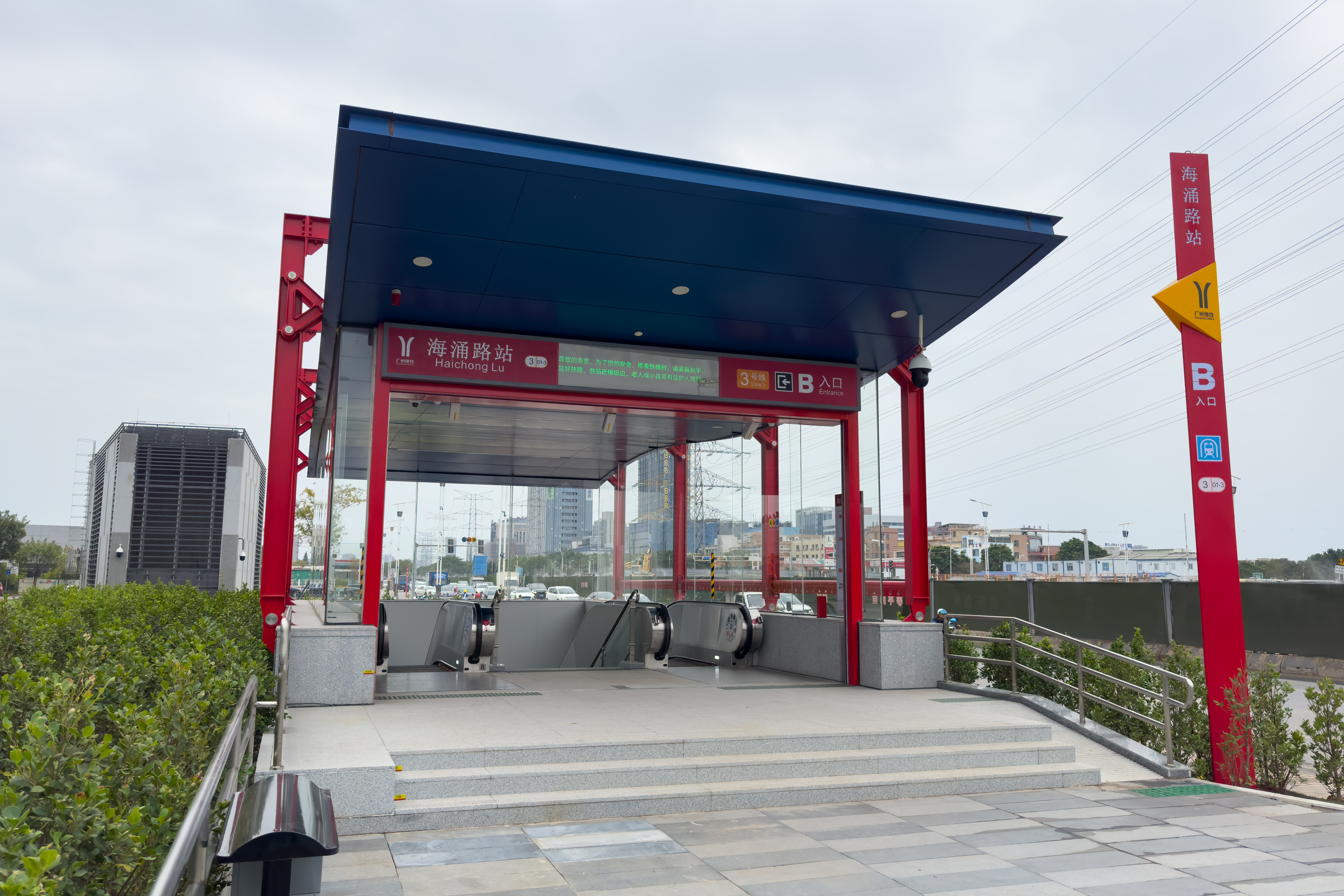
Entrance B

== History ==
The station first appeared in the 2003 plan of Guangzhou Urban Rail Transit Plan, when Line 3 planned to travel from Panyu Square to the east to Guangzhou New Town in the direction of Nansha and build a station near Haichong Road intersection with Yayun (Asian Games) Avenue on the way. The station was originally planned to be named Qianfengcun, but was later renamed to Jinguang Dadao. Subsequently, as part of the East Extension of Line 3, the station was approved by the National Development and Reform Commission in late March 2017 and plans were approved in early January 2018.

The construction of this station started on 29 April 2020, the construction of the enclosure structure was completed on September 27 of the same year, and the main structure was topped out in June 2021. In June 2023, Guangzhou Metro Group proposed to name the station Haichong Lu (Road), which was officially approved in October of the same year. On 31 May 2024, the station completed the "three rights" transfer. On 1 November 2024, the eastern extension of Line 3 was put into operation, along with the station.
