= Dongchong station =

Guangzhou Metro station

Coordinates: 22°53′09″N 113°28′45″E

Dongchong 东涌
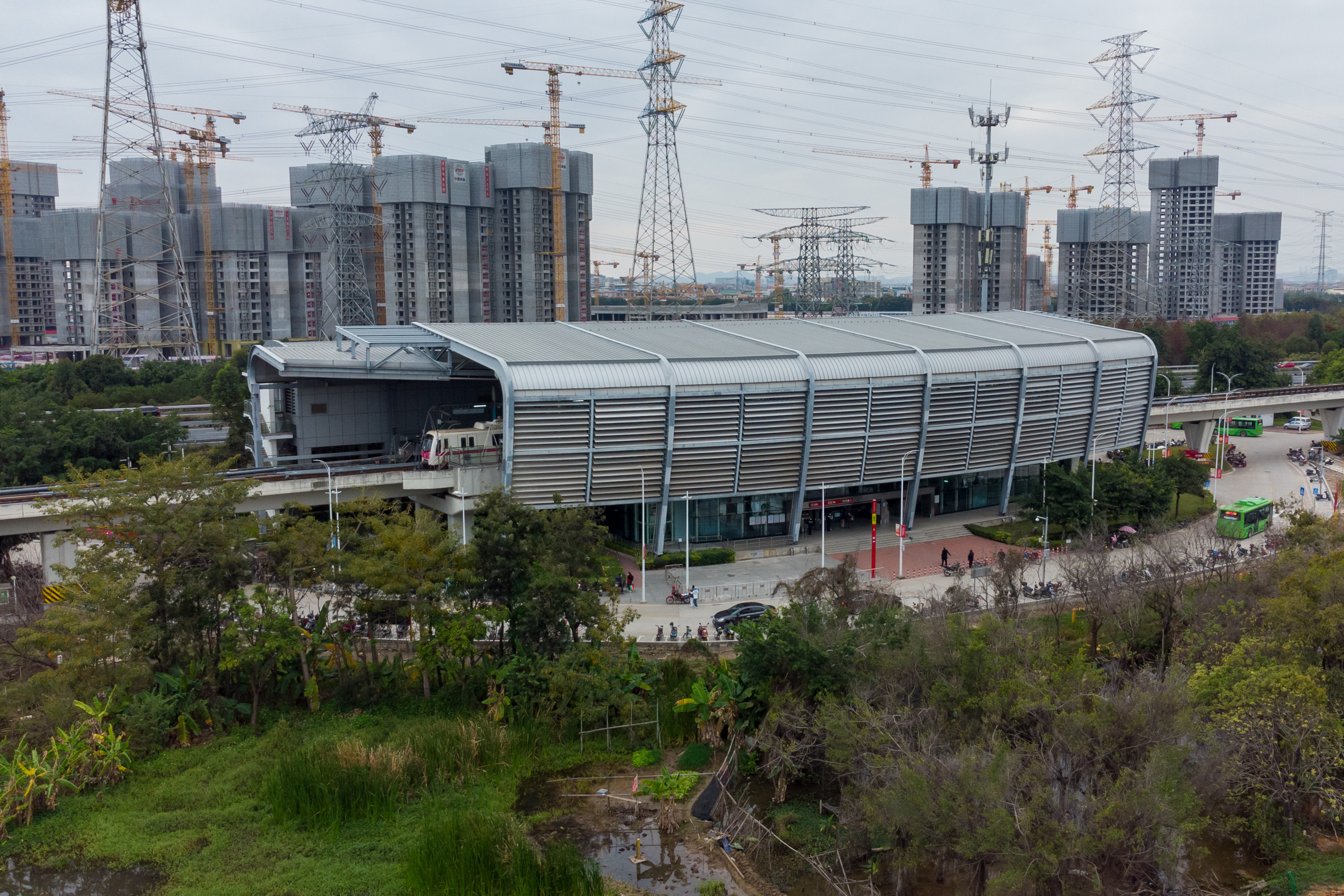

Chinese name
- Simplified Chinese: 东涌站
- Traditional Chinese: 東涌站
- Literal meaning: East River station
Transcriptions
Standard Mandarin
- Hanyu Pinyin: Dōngchōng Zhàn
Yue: Cantonese
- Yale Romanization: Dūngchūng Jaahm
- Jyutping: Dung^{1}cung^{1} Zaam^{6}
- Hong Kong Romanization: Tung Chung station

General information
- Location: Nansha District, Guangzhou, Guangdong; China
- Operated by: Guangzhou Metro Co. Ltd.
- Line: Line 4
- Platforms: 2 (2 side platforms)

Construction
- Structure type: Elevated

Other information
- Station code: 412

History
- Opened: 30 December 2006; 19 years ago

Services
Preceding station	Guangzhou Metro	Following station
Dichong towards Huangcun	Line 4	Qingsheng towards Nansha Passenger Port
Location

Dongchong Station (simplified Chinese: 东涌站; traditional Chinese: 東涌站; Cantonese Yale: Dūngchūng Jaahm) is an elevated station of Line 4 of the Guangzhou Metro. It started operations on 30 December 2006. It is located at the junction of Jingzhu Expressway, Dongchong Avenue and Maofeng Road in Dongchong Town, Nansha District.

== Station layout ==
F2; Platforms	Side platform, doors will open on the right
F2; Platforms	Platform 2	4 towards Nansha Passenger Port (Qingsheng)
F2; Platforms	Platform 1	4 towards Huangcun (Dichong)
F2; Platforms	Side platform, doors will open on the right
G Concourse	Lobby	Customer Service, Vending machines, ATMs, Toilet, Payphones, Police counter, Babycare room

== Exits ==
Exit number	Exit location
Exit A	Shinan Lu
Exit B	Shinan Lu
Exit C	Maofeng Lu

== Gallery ==
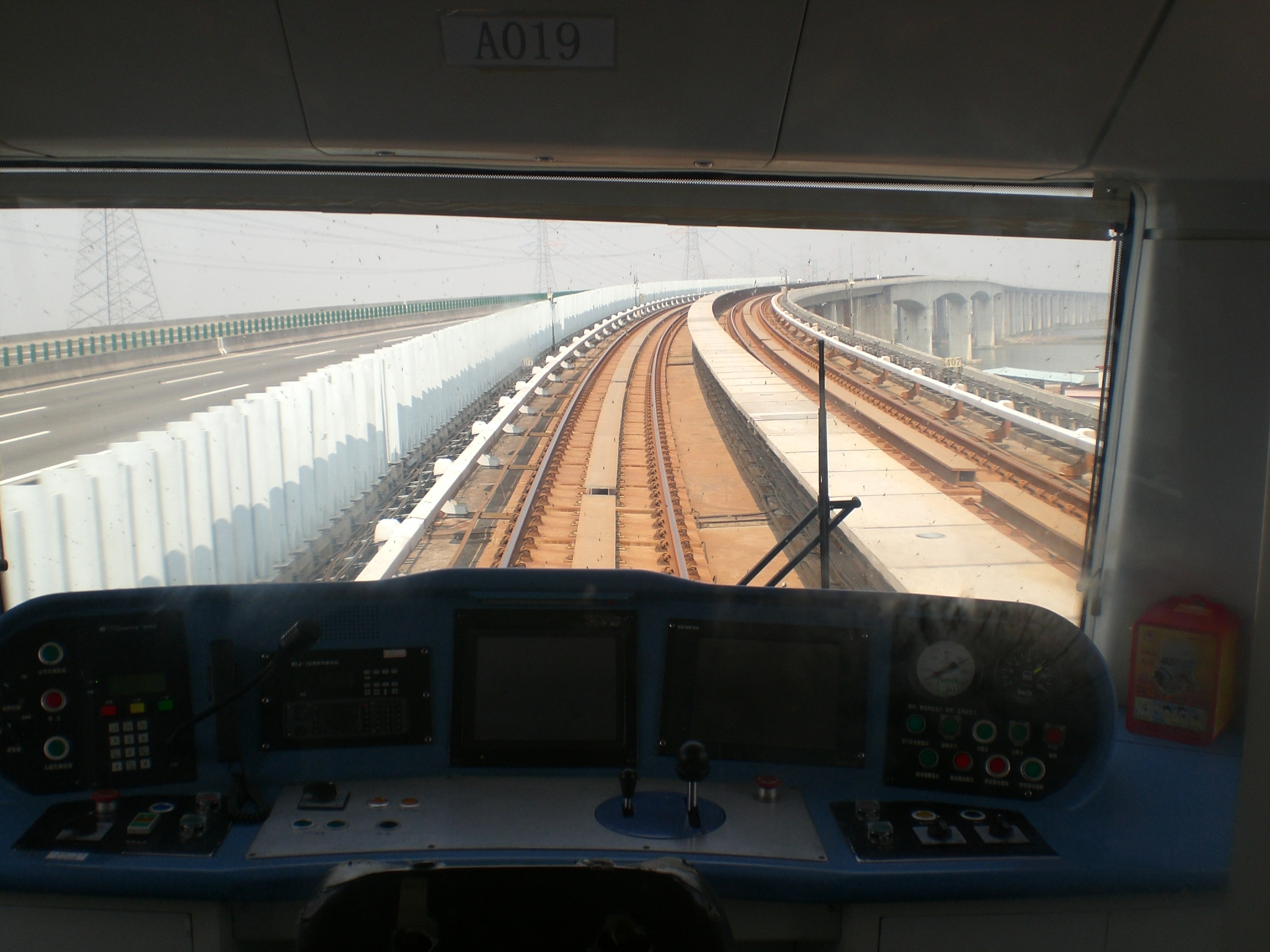
View from Metro near Dongchong
