= Haibang station =

Guangzhou Metro Line 3 and Line 4 station

Haibang 海傍
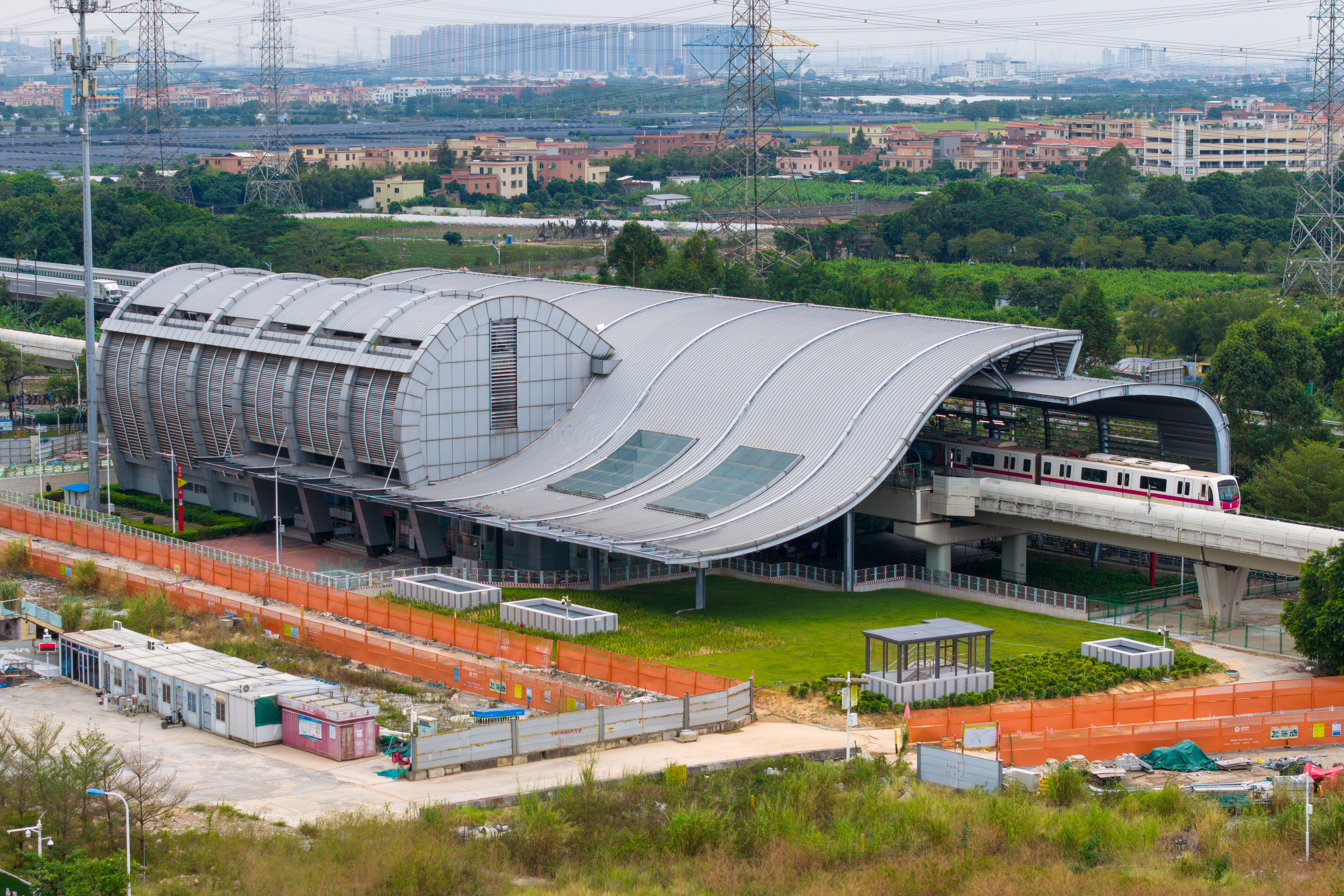
- Line 4 station exterior

Chinese name
- Chinese: 海傍站
Transcriptions
Standard Mandarin
- Hanyu Pinyin: Hǎibāng Zhàn
Yue: Cantonese
- Yale Romanization: Hóibohng Jaahm
- Jyutping: Hoi^{2}bong^{6} Zaam^{6}
- Hong Kong Romanization: Hoi Pong station

General information
- Location: East side of G4 Beijing–Hong Kong and Macau Expressway, northwest of intersection of South Yayun Road (亚运南路) and Kangti Road (康体路), Shiqi; Panyu District, Guangzhou, Guangdong; China
- Coordinates: 22°56′34″N 113°27′55″E
- Operated by: Guangzhou Metro Co. Ltd.
- Lines: Line 3; Line 4
- Platforms: 4 (2 side platforms for Line 4 and 1 island platform for Line 3)

Construction
- Structure type: Elevated (Line 4); Underground (Line 3)
- Accessible: Yes

Other information
- Station code: 301-4 414

History
- Opened: Line 4: 30 December 2006 (19 years ago); Line 3: 1 November 2024 (20 months ago)

Services
Preceding station	Guangzhou Metro	Following station
Terminus	Line 3	Haichong Lu towards Airport North (Terminal 2) or Tianhe Coach Terminal
Shiqi towards Huangcun	Line 4	Dichong towards Nansha Passenger Port
Location

Haibang Station (Chinese: 海傍站; Cantonese Yale: Hóibohng Jaahm) is an interchange station between Line 3 and Line 4 of the Guangzhou Metro, and also the southeastern terminus of Line 3. The Line 4 station started operations on 30 December 2006 and is located at the junction of Changnan Road. and the Jingzhu Expressway in Shiqi Town (石碁镇), Panyu District. The Line 3 station started operations on 1 November 2024.

== Station theme ==
It is the theme station of the east extension of Line 3, with the design theme of "Chasing the Water Facing the Sea". The ceiling of the station adopts a gradient color wave shape, and the wall is decorated with watercolor wave patterns to show the local characteristics of the Shatian Water Town style.

== Station layout ==
F2; Platforms	Side platform, doors will open on the right
F2; Platforms	Platform 4	4 towards Nansha Passenger Port (Dichong)
F2; Platforms	Platform 3	4 towards Huangcun (Shiqi)
F2; Platforms	Side platform, doors will open on the right
G Concourse	Line 4 Lobby	Customer Service, Shops, Vending machines, ATMs, Exits, Toilets, Nursery
B1; Concourse	Line 3 Lobby	Ticket Machines, Customer Service, Shops, Safety Facilities, Transfer passageways between Lobbies
B2; Platforms	Platform 1	3 termination platform
B2; Platforms	Island platform, doors will open on the left (Toilets, Nursery)
B2; Platforms	Platform 2	3 towards Tianhe Coach Terminal or Airport North (Terminal 2) (Haichong Lu)

=== Entrances/exits ===
The station has 6 points of entry/exit, distributed between the Line 4 ground level concourse and the Line 3 first basement floor concourse. Exits A, B and C have accessible ramps and Exit F is accessible via elevator.

==== Line 3 concourse (first basement floor) ====
- E: Kangti Road
- F: Kangti Road
- G: Kangti Road, The Second Affiliated Hospital of Guangzhou Medical University

==== Line 4 concourse (ground level) ====
- A: Kangti Road
- B: Kangti Road
- C: Kangti Road
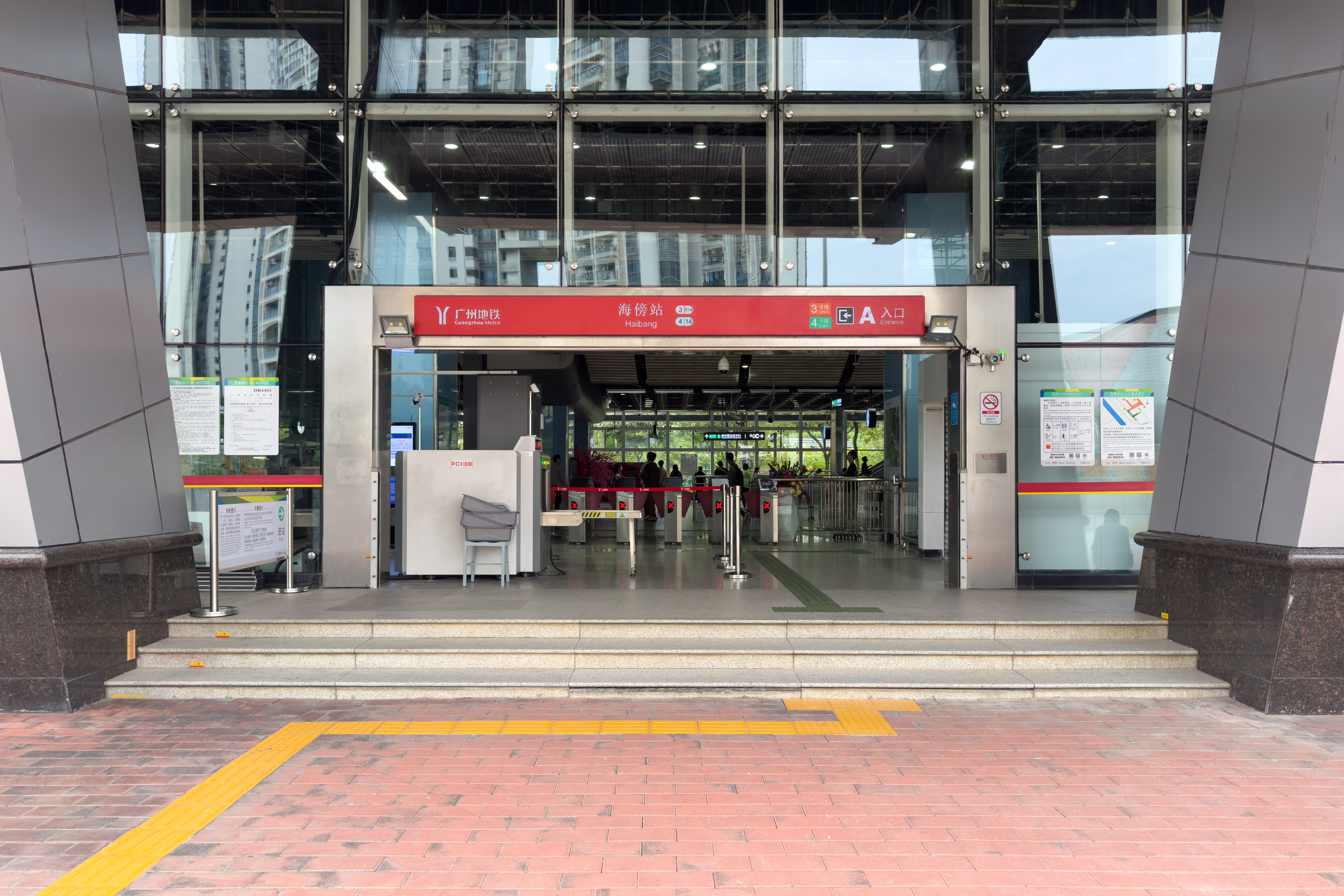
Entrance A

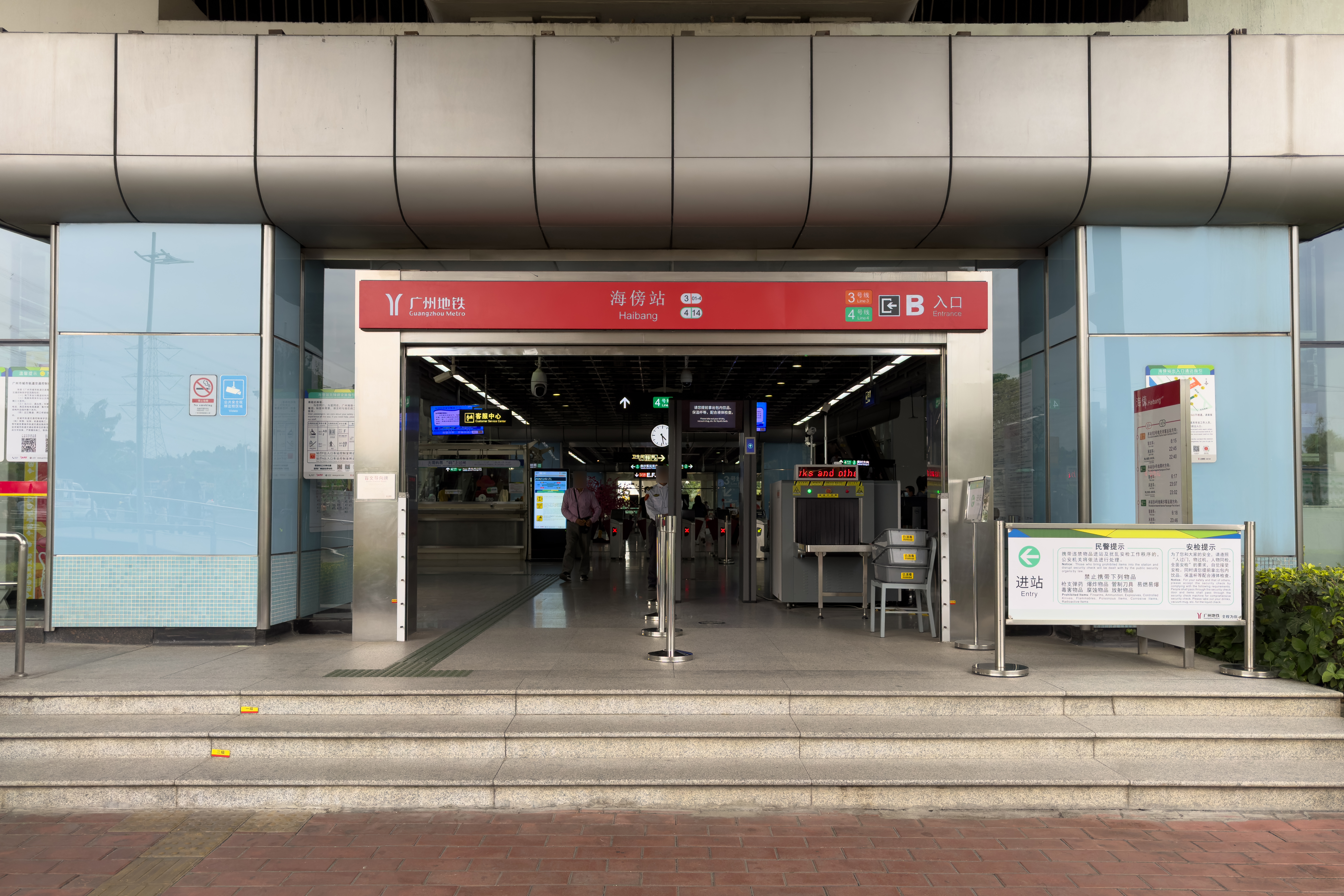
Entrance B

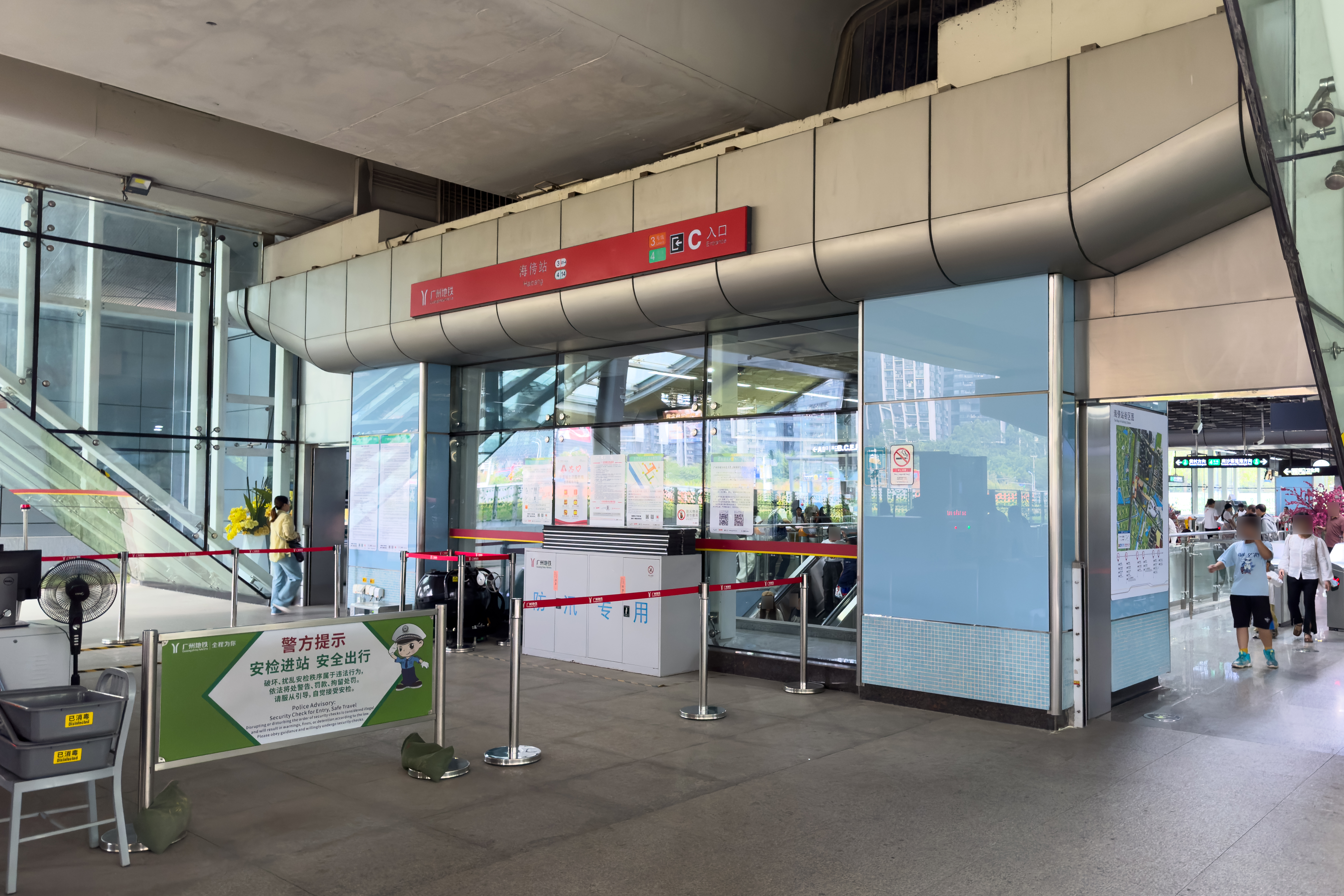
Entrance C

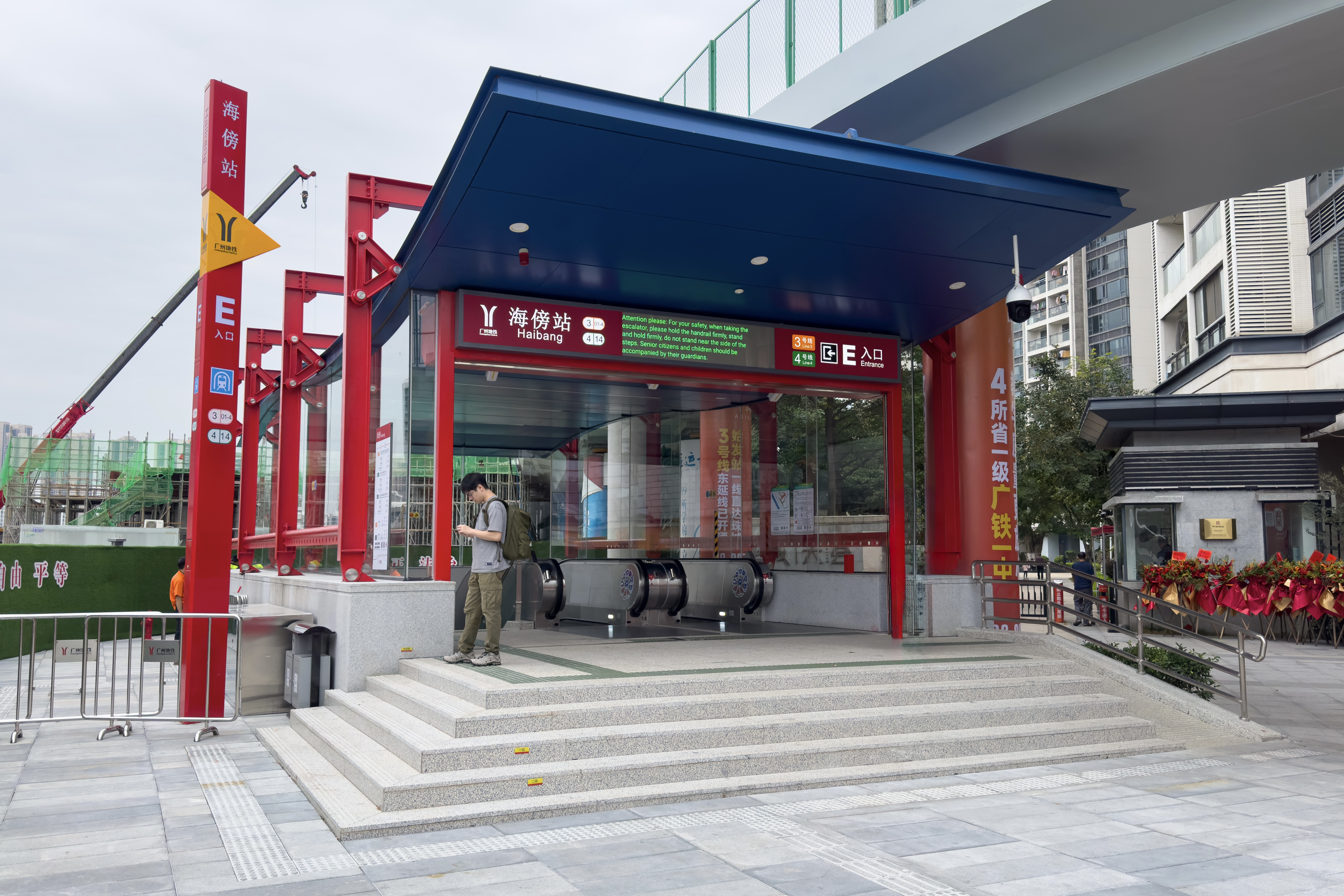
Entrance E

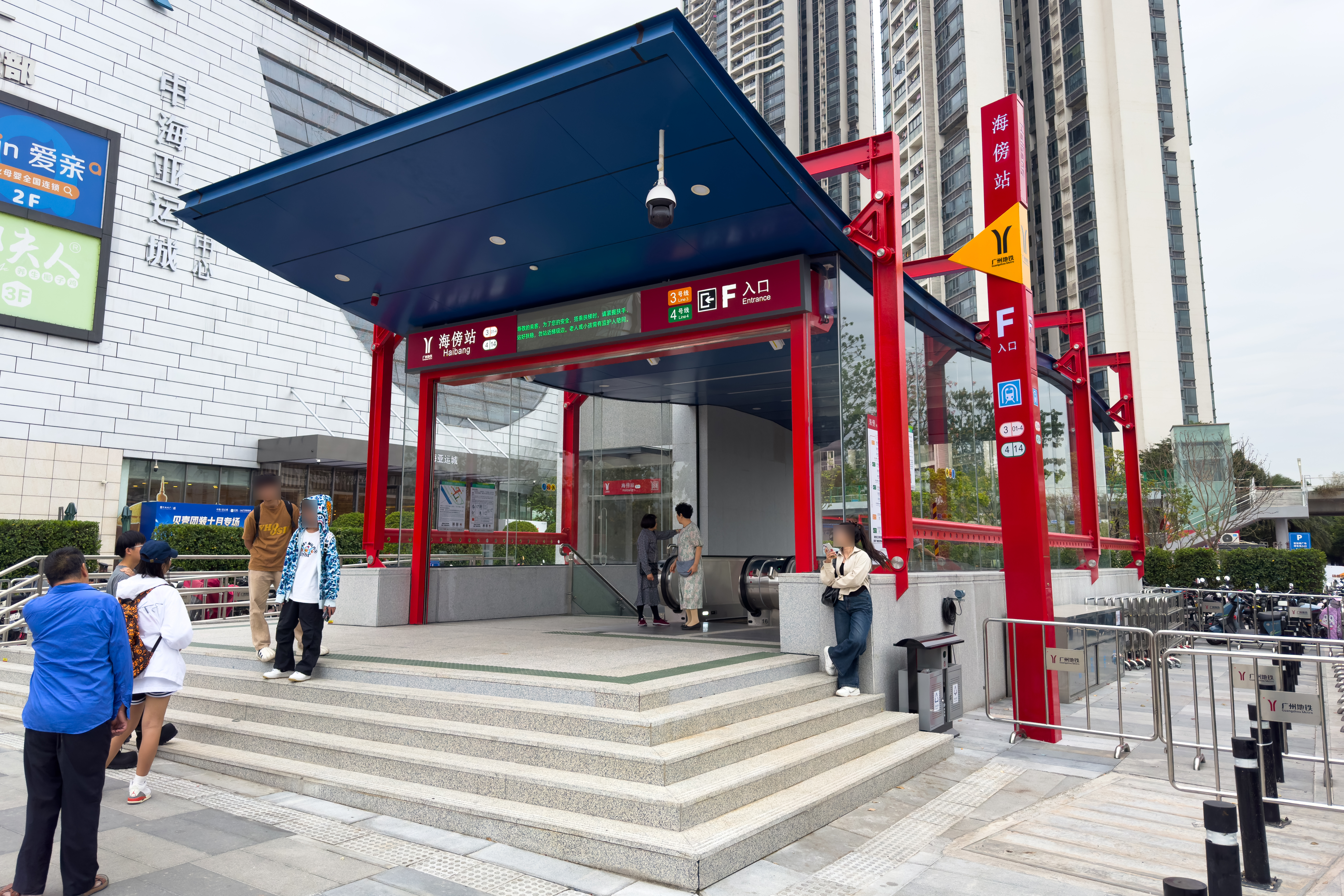
Entrance F

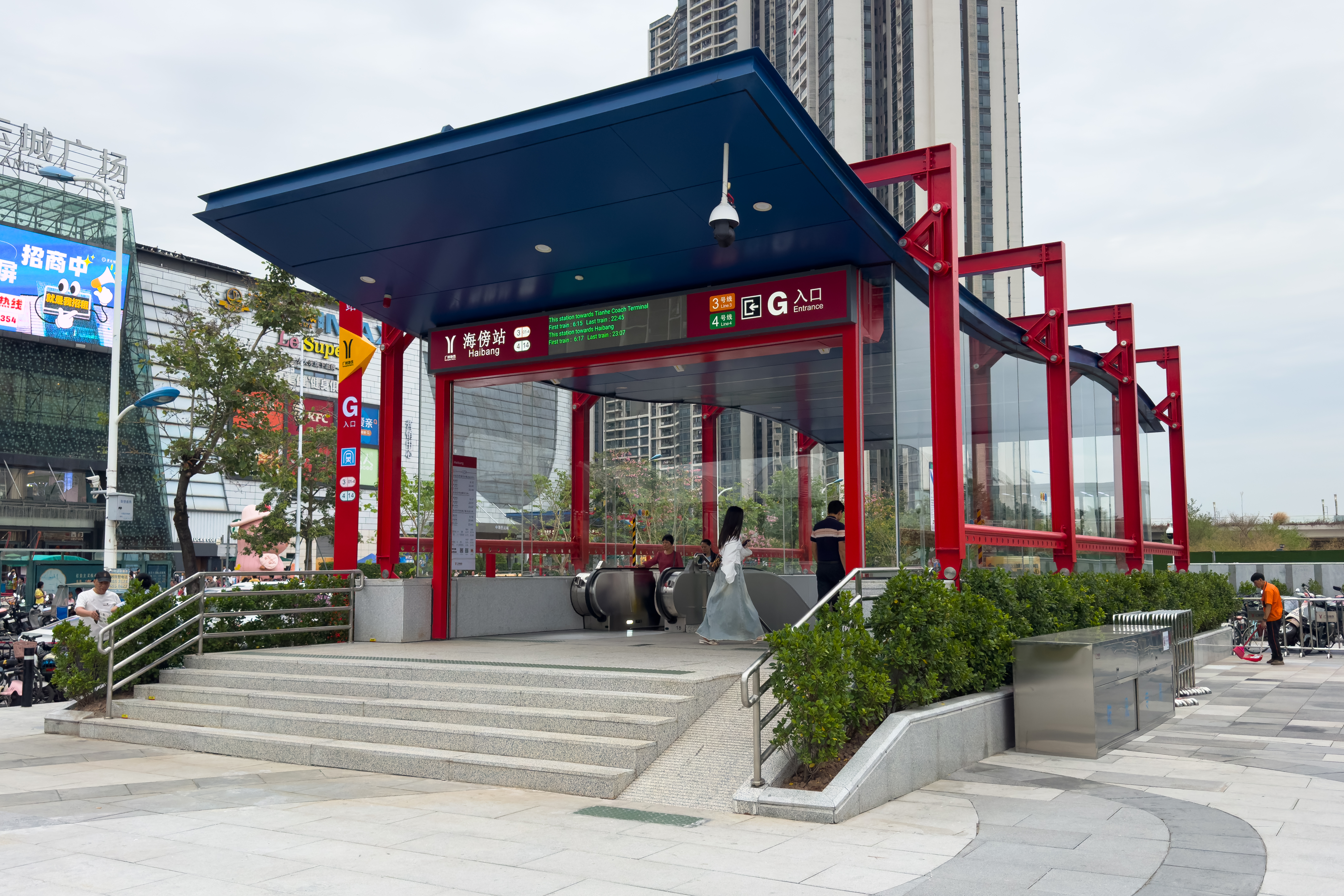
Entrance G

== Gallery ==
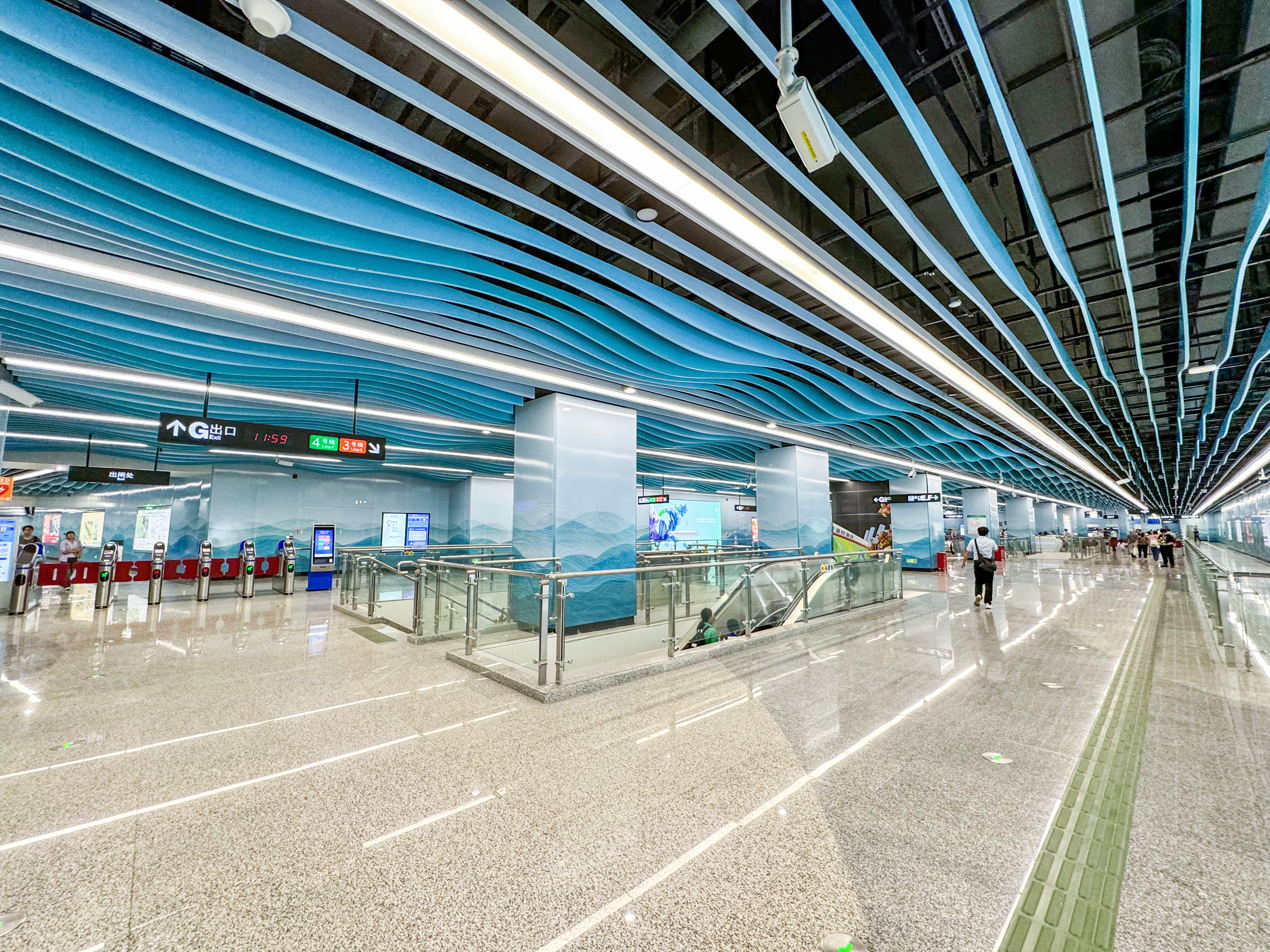
Line 3 concourse

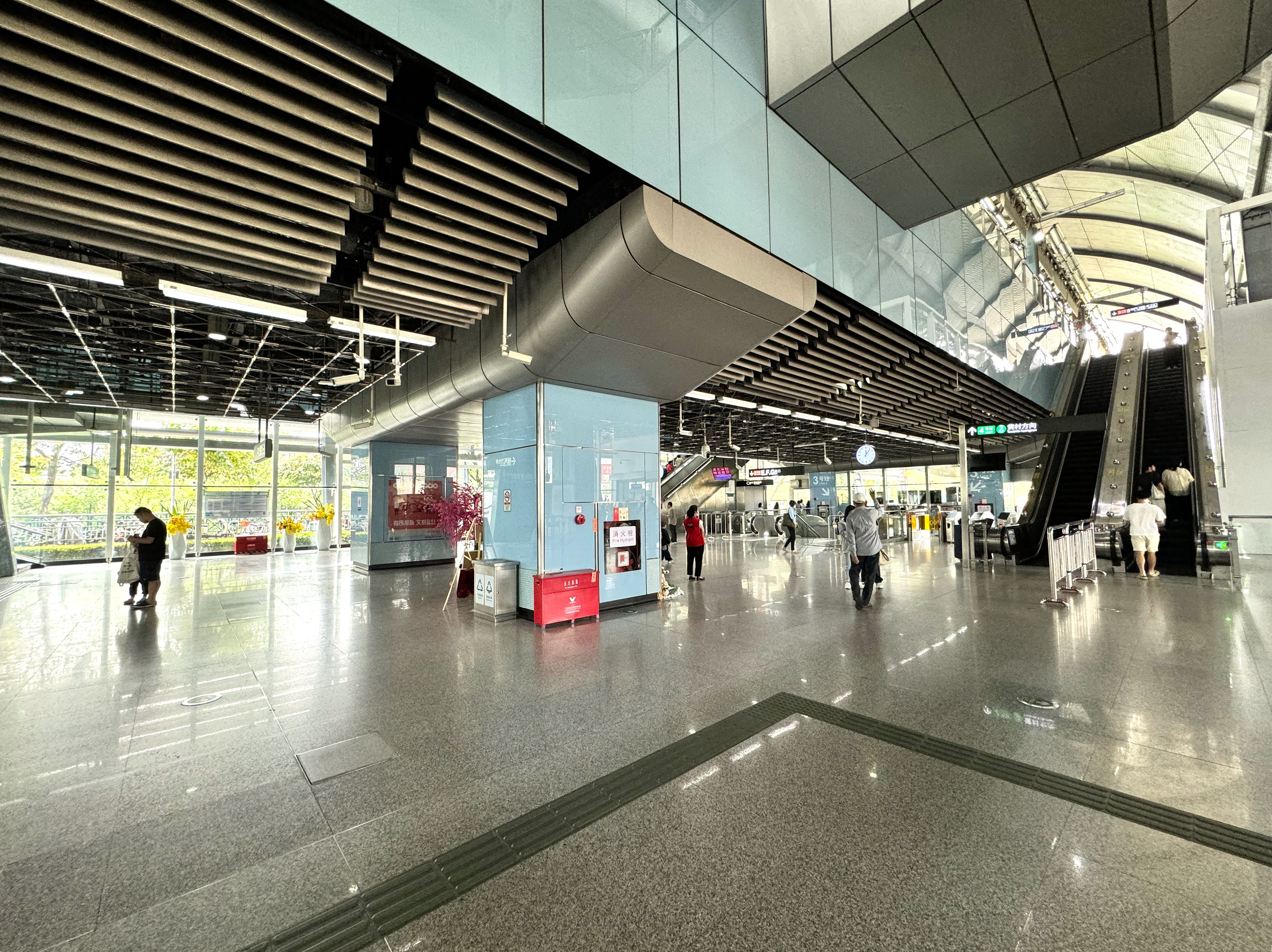
Line 4 concourse

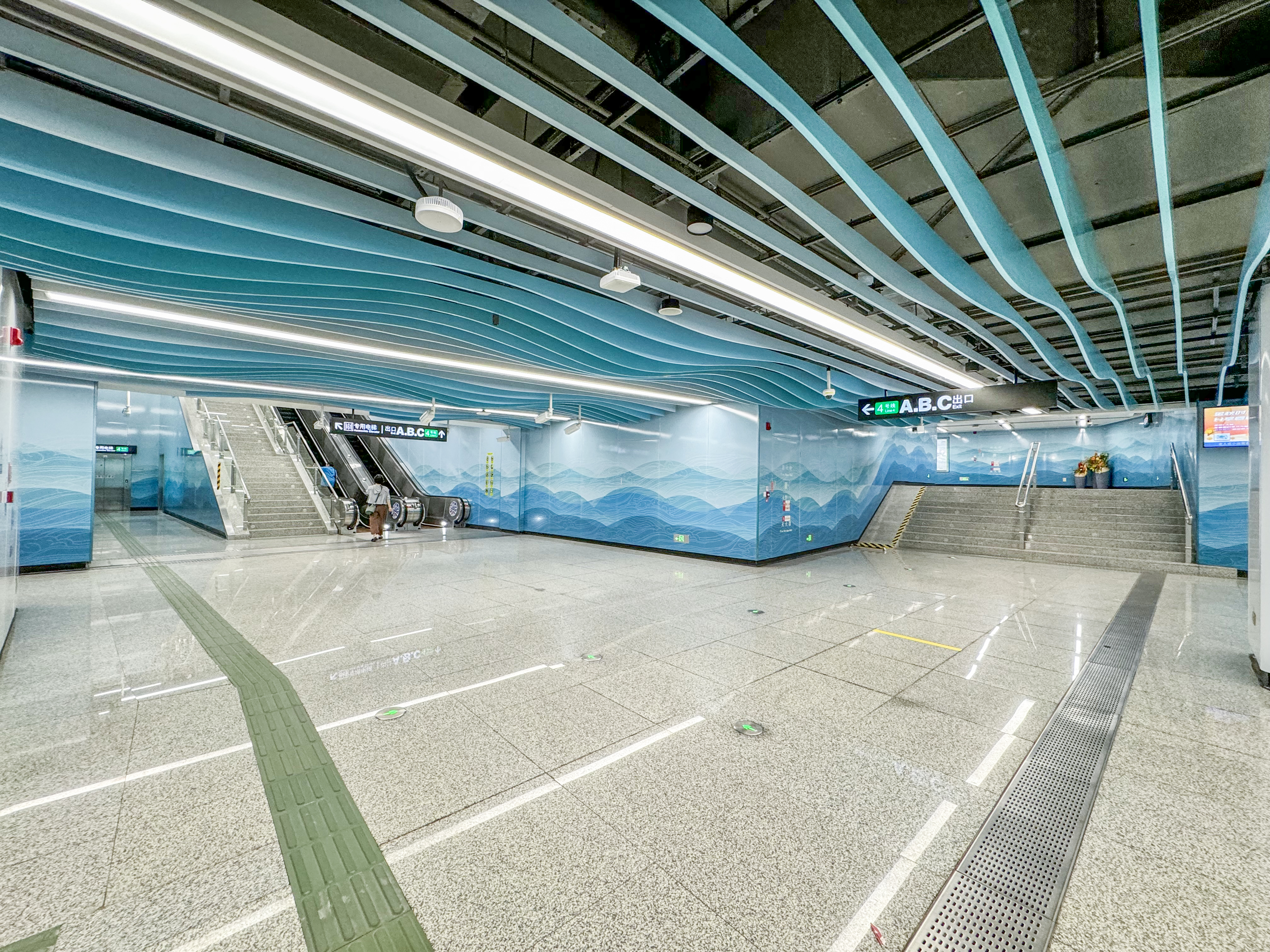
Transfer level between the two lines

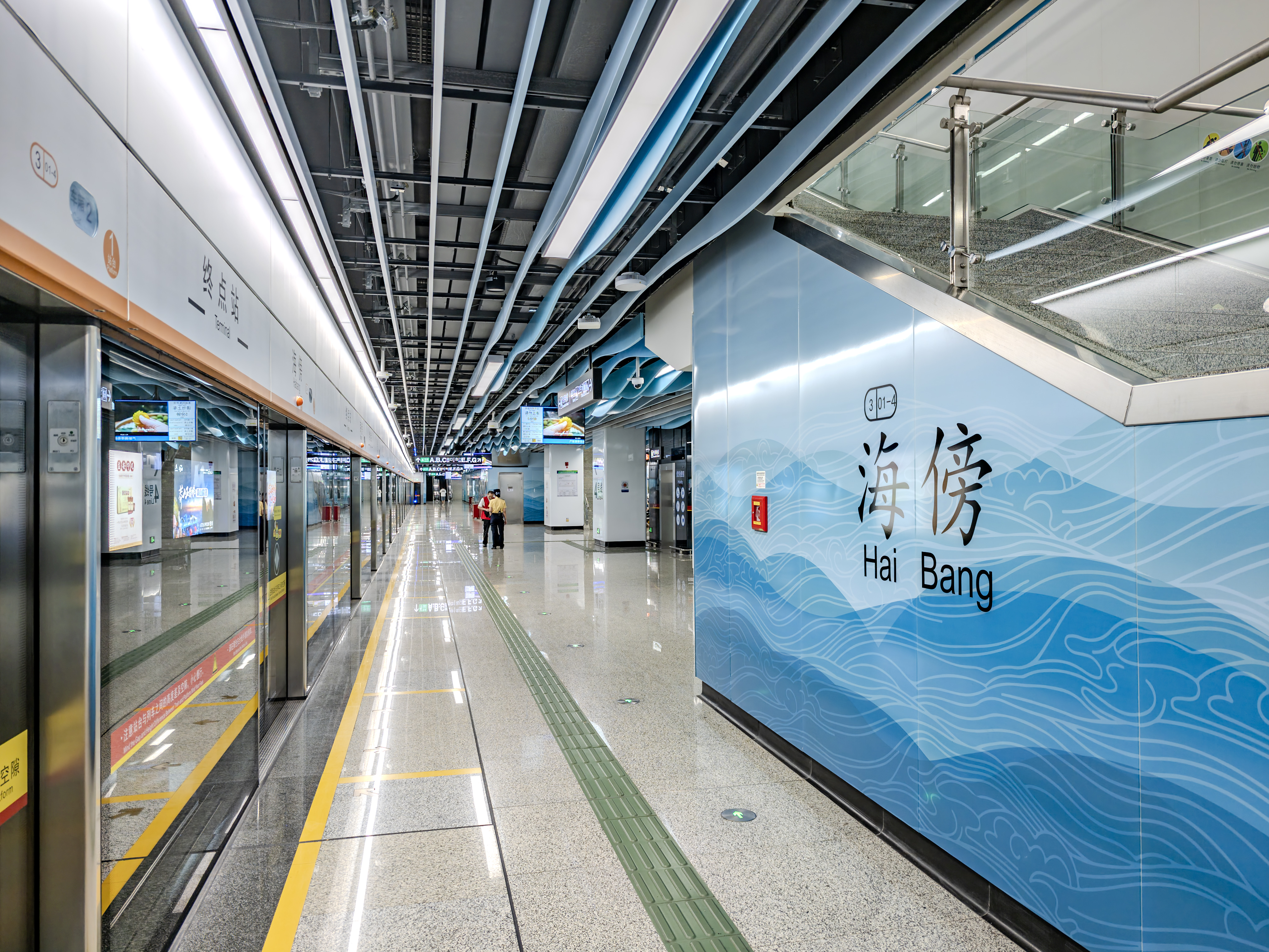
Line 3 alighting platform

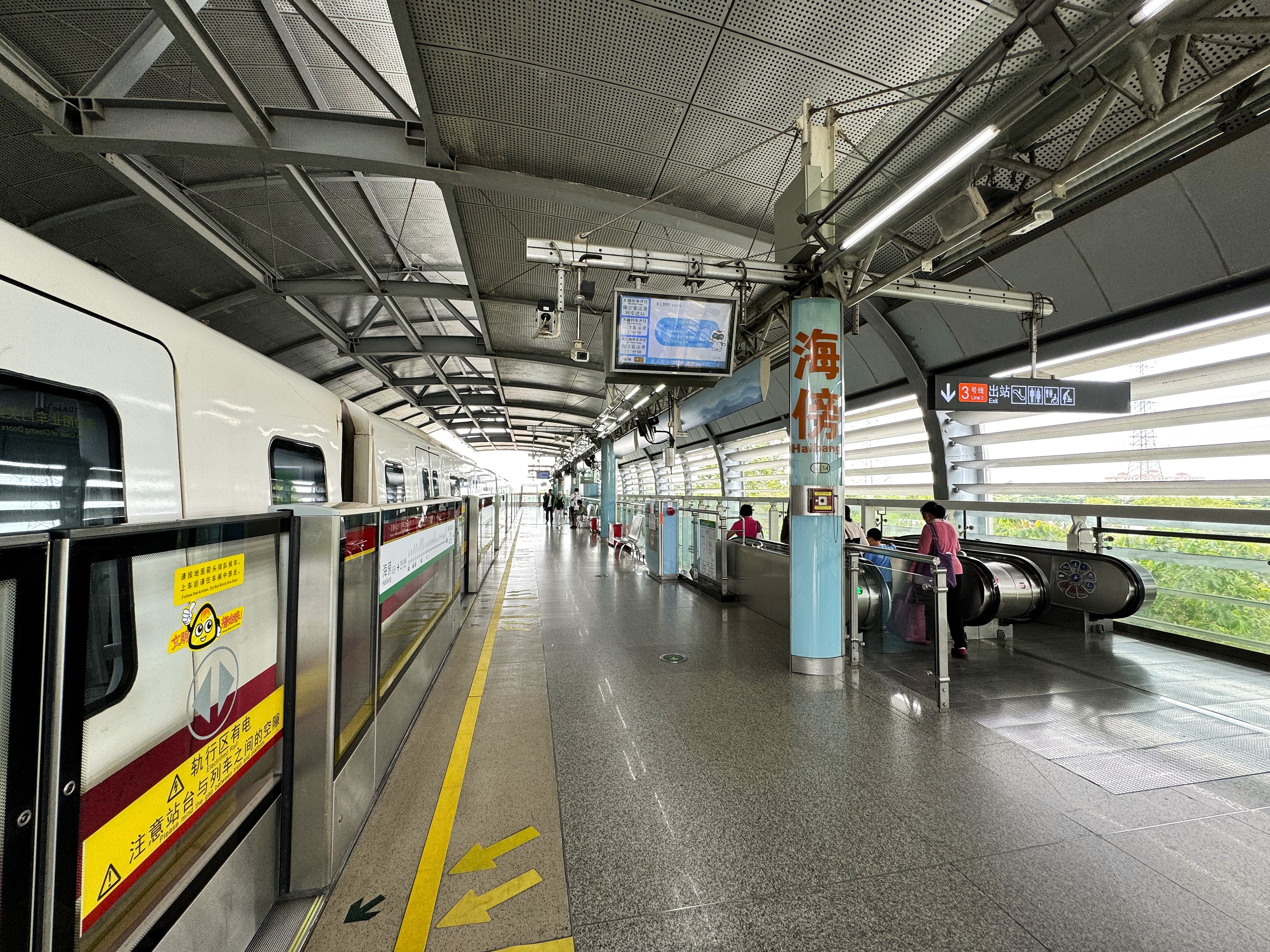
Line 4 platform (towards Nansha Passenger Port)

== History ==
The project of the eastern extension of Line 3 was approved by the National Development and Reform Commission in late March 2017, and the construction report was approved in early January 2018, followed by the construction of the station part of Line 3 in mid-2019. On 1 July 2023, the tunnel boring machine broke through, and on 27 October, the main structure was topped out. The "three rights" transfer was completed on 31 May 2024. On 1 November 2024, the eastern extension of Line 3 was put into operation, along with the station.

=== Line 3 opening complications ===
The natural gas pipelines that affected the opening of Qingsheng Station and Guangzhou Metro Line 22 earlier once brought uncertainty to the partial opening of Line 3 of this station. In 2022, the authorities issued a notice stating that the expansion of Haibang station would have affected the operation of the existing three pipelines, namely Guangzhou Gas, Dapeng Gas and Sinopec Pipeline, and they would need to be relocated. The Dapeng Gas Pipeline and Sinopec Oil Pipeline started construction and relocation in December 2023 and March 2024, respectively, and were completed in March 2025. The Guangzhou Gas Pipeline will be relocated and renovated by the Guangzhou Metro Group itself, and the relocation began as of October 2024.

Although the station had already been handed over to the subway operation department for commissioning, the latter was even ready to open the station at the end of September 2024, but this did not happen. The authorities have responded that the station of Line 3 can only be opened after the construction of the pipeline is completed and the pipeline is accepted. However, it was not until 30 October that the Guangzhou Metro Group announced that the eastern extension of Line 3, including this station, would open on 1 November of the same year. The relocation and renovation of the Dapeng gas pipeline was put into trial operation in April 2025.

=== Operational incident ===
During COVID-19 pandemic control rules at the end of 2022, due to the impact of prevention and control measures, station service was suspended from 28 November 2022 to the afternoon of 30 November 2022.
