= Higher Education Mega Center South station =

Guangzhou Metro interchange station

Higher Education Mega Center South 大学城南
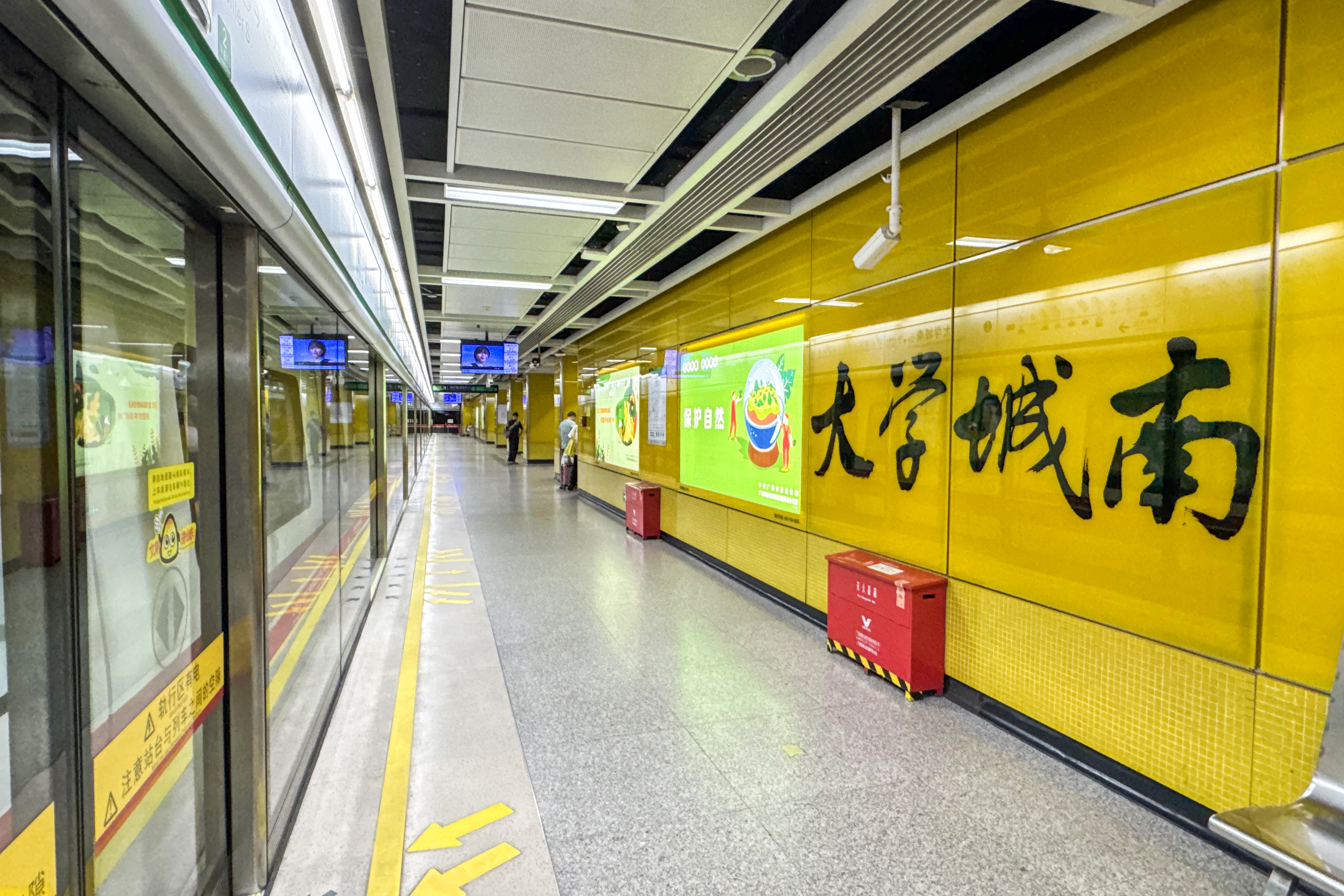
- Platform 1 (Line 4 towards Huangcun)

Chinese name
- Simplified Chinese: 大学城南站
- Traditional Chinese: 大學城南站
- Literal meaning: University City South Station
Transcriptions
Standard Mandarin
- Hanyu Pinyin: Dàxuéchéng Nán Zhàn
Yue: Cantonese
- Yale Romanization: Daaihhohksìhng Nàahm Jaahm
- Jyutping: Daai^{6}hok^{6}sing^{4} Naam^{4} Zaam^{6}

General information
- Location: Guangzhou Higher Education Mega Center Main North Street and Central Road Intersection; Xiaoguwei, Panyu District, Guangzhou, Guangdong; China
- Coordinates: 23°02′36″N 113°24′02″E
- Operator: Guangzhou Metro Co. Ltd.
- Lines: Line 4; Line 7; Line 12
- Platforms: 6 (2 side platforms and 2 island platforms)
- Tracks: 6

Construction
- Structure type: Underground
- Accessible: Yes

Other information
- Station code: 418 709 1225

History
- Opened: Line 4: 26 December 2005 (20 years ago); Line 7: 28 December 2016 (9 years ago); Line 12: 29 June 2025 (13 months ago)
- Former names: Nanting (南亭) (2005-May 2006)

Services
Preceding station	Guangzhou Metro	Following station
Higher Education Mega Center North towards Huangcun	Line 4	Xinzao towards Nansha Passenger Port
Banqiao towards Meidi Dadao	Line 7	Shenjing towards Yanshan
Higher Education Mega Center North towards Ersha Island	Line 12 East section	Terminus
Location

Higher Education Mega Center South Station (simplified Chinese: 大学城南站; traditional Chinese: 大學城南站; Cantonese Yale: Daaihhohksìhng Nàahm Jaahm) is an interchange station between Line 4, Line 7, and Line 12 of the Guangzhou Metro. The Line 4 station started operations on 26 December 2005. It is located at the underground of the south of Guangzhou Higher Education Mega Center, located on Xiaoguwei Island in Xiaoguwei Subdistrict in Guangzhou's Panyu District. The station became an interchange station when Line 7 started operations on 28 December 2016, and became a three-line interchange station when Line 12 started operations on 29 June 2025. It is the eastern terminus of Line 12.

The station was previously called Nanting Station (南亭站; Nàahmtìhng Jaahm) because of nearby Nanting Village (南亭村) on the island, before changing its name to its current name in May 2006.

== Station layout ==
The station is a three-storey underground station. The ground level is the exit, and it is surrounded by Higher Education Mega Center Main South Street, Central Road East and other nearby buildings. The first floor are the platforms for Line 4 and the west and east concourses, the second floor includes the platform for Line 7, connecting passages and the north and south transfer levels of Line 12, and the third floor is the platform for Line 12.

The station is one of three themed stations on Line 7, with the theme of "Zhi-Island" in the paid area of the east concourse, and the main content is in the form of Di Zi Gui and movable type printing, presenting the "idea of inheritance in three dimensions", consistent with the educational temperament of the Guangzhou Higher Education Mega Center.

There are toilets on the east concourse near Exit C when Line 7 initially opened. There are also toilets and a nursery room at the south end of the Line 12 platforms.

G	-	Exits A-F
L1; Concourse & 4 Platforms	4 7 12 West Lobby	Ticket Machines, Customer Service, Police Station
L1; Concourse & 4 Platforms	Side platform, doors will open on the right
L1; Concourse & 4 Platforms	Platform 2	4 towards Nansha Passenger Port (Xinzao)
L1; Concourse & 4 Platforms	Platform 1	4 towards Huangcun (Higher Education Mega Center North)
L1; Concourse & 4 Platforms	Side platform, doors will open on the right
L1; Concourse & 4 Platforms	4 7 East Lobby	Ticket Machines, Customer Service, Shops, Police Station, Security Facilities, Toilets
L2; 7 Platforms, 12 Mezzanine	Line 12 North Transfer Level	Towards west concourse and Line 12 platforms
L2; 7 Platforms, 12 Mezzanine	Connecting passage	Paid area link towards Line 4 platforms
L2; 7 Platforms, 12 Mezzanine	Platform 4	7 towards Meidi Dadao (Banqiao)
L2; 7 Platforms, 12 Mezzanine	Island platform, doors will open on the left
L2; 7 Platforms, 12 Mezzanine	Platform 3	7 towards Yanshan (Shenjing)
L2; 7 Platforms, 12 Mezzanine	Line 12 South Transfer Level	Towards west concourse and Line 12 platforms
L3; 12 Platforms	Platform 6	12 towards Ersha Island (Higher Education Mega Center North)
L3; 12 Platforms	Island platform, doors will open on the left (Toilets, Nursery)
L3; 12 Platforms	Platform 5	12 termination platform

=== Concourse ===
The station is divided into two concourses, east and west, both of which are located on the first floor and are separated by the Line 4 platforms. The two concourses and the two platforms of Line 4 are connected by two under-track links and the Line 7 platform, where the non-paid area is connected by the staircase side of the underpass, and the paid area is connected by the escalator side and the Line 7 platform. There is a dedicated elevator in the paid area of both concourses, stairs and escalators connecting to the Line 7 platform.

Both concourses are equipped with electronic ticket vending machines and AI customer service centers. Convenience stores and snack stores, as well as self-service facilities such as vending machines, charging machines and luggage lockers are also available for passengers, including a 7-Eleven near Exit C and a FamilyMart near Exit D. An automated external defibrillator is located next to the station control center and at Exit A.

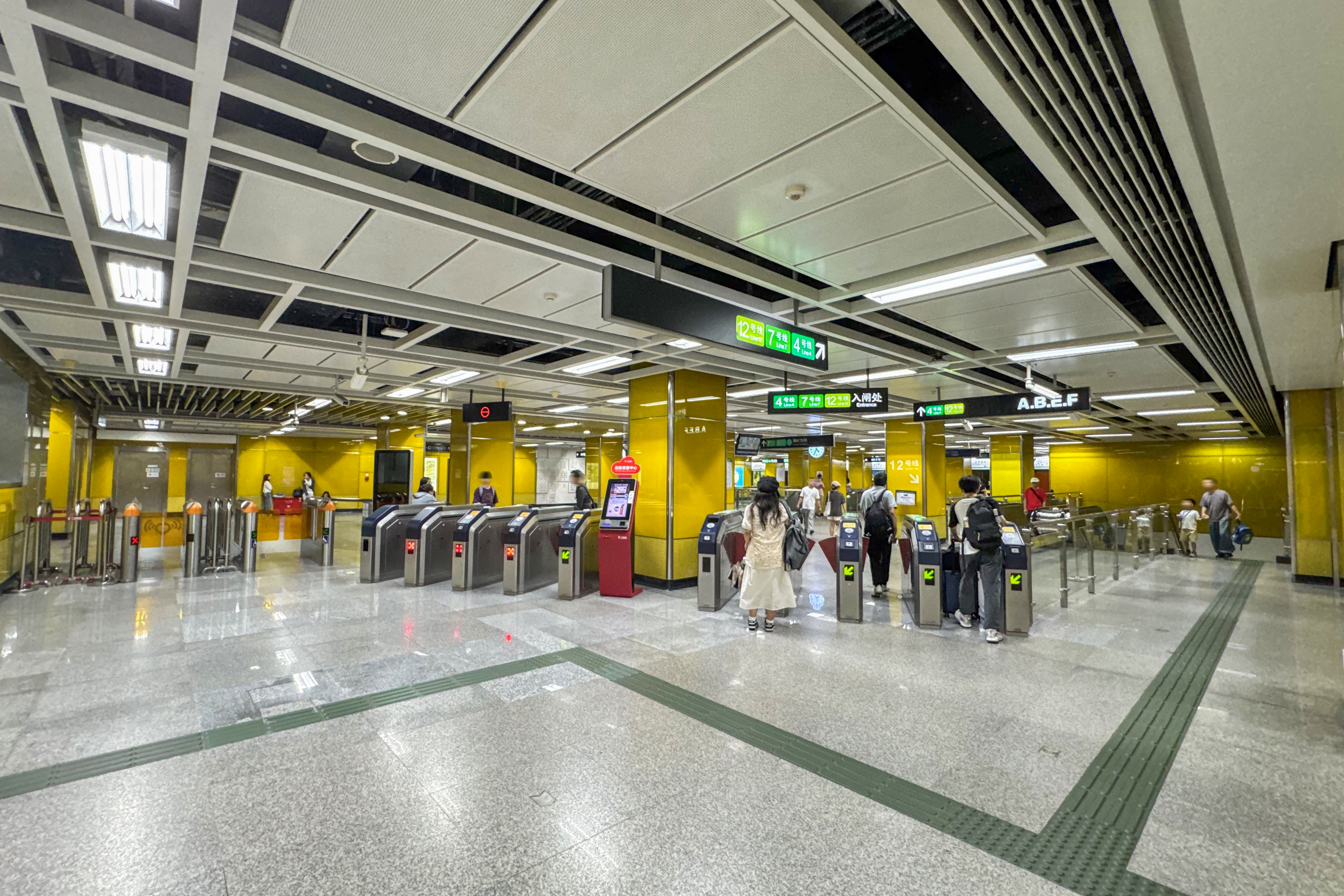
West concourse

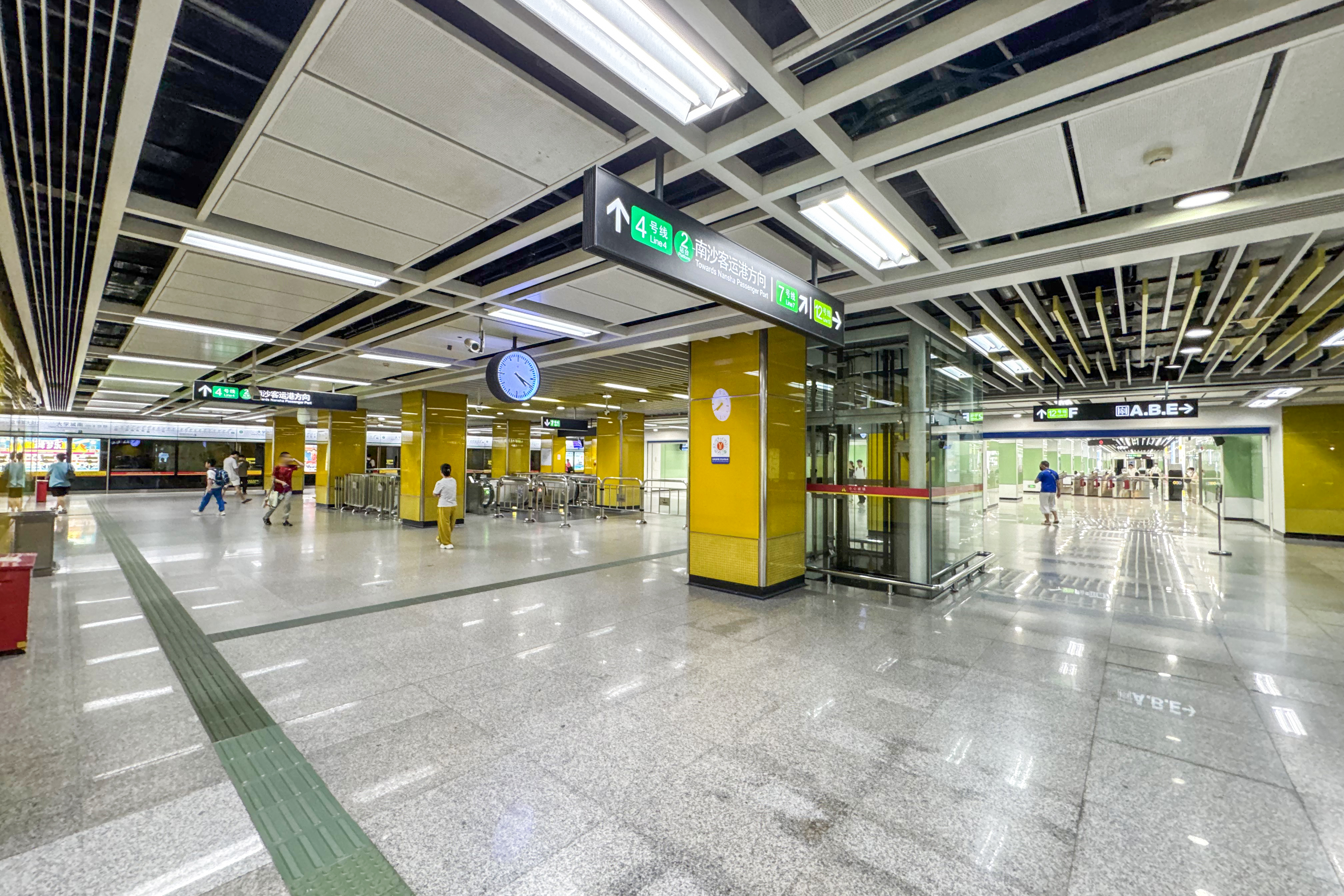
South concourse

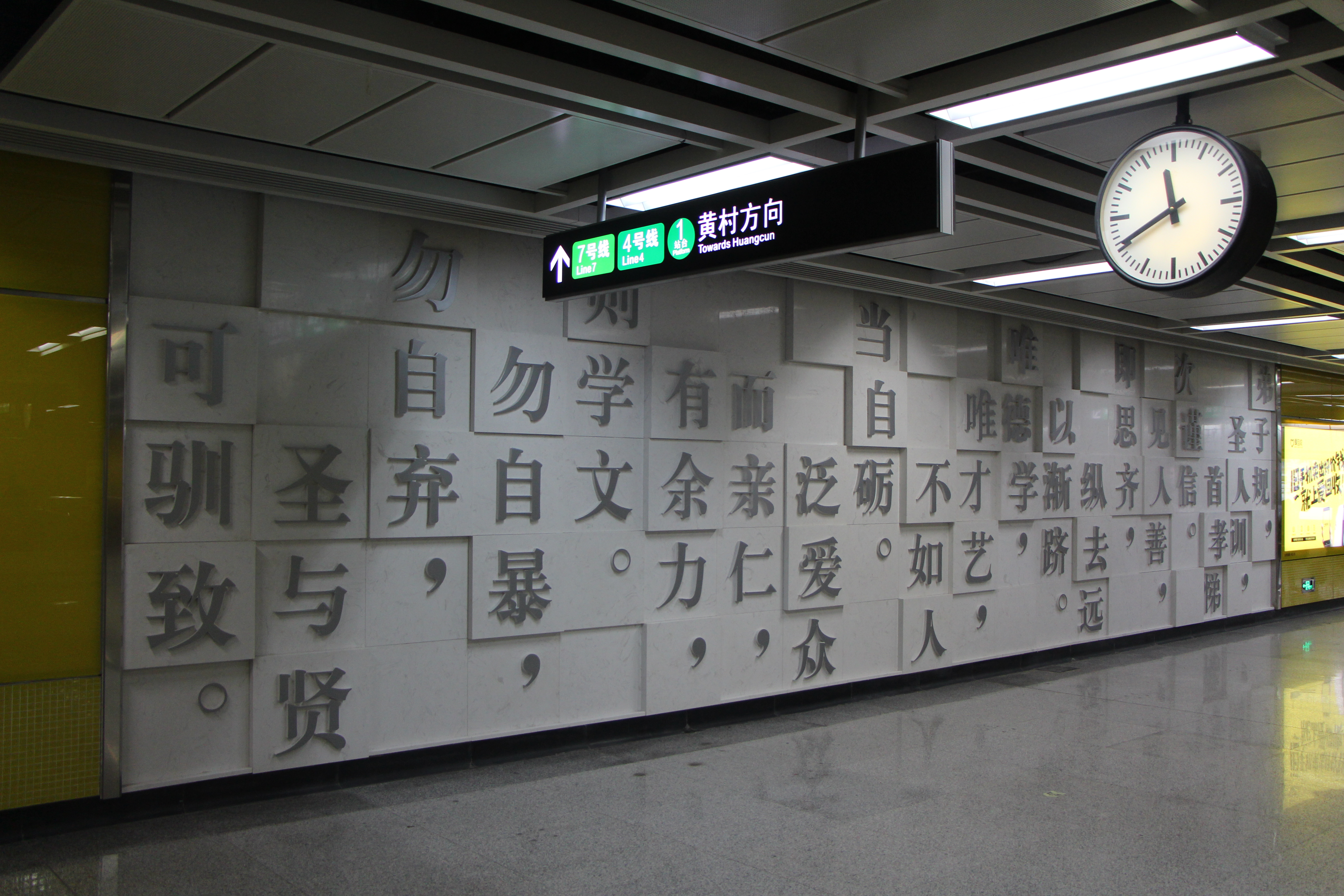
Culture wall

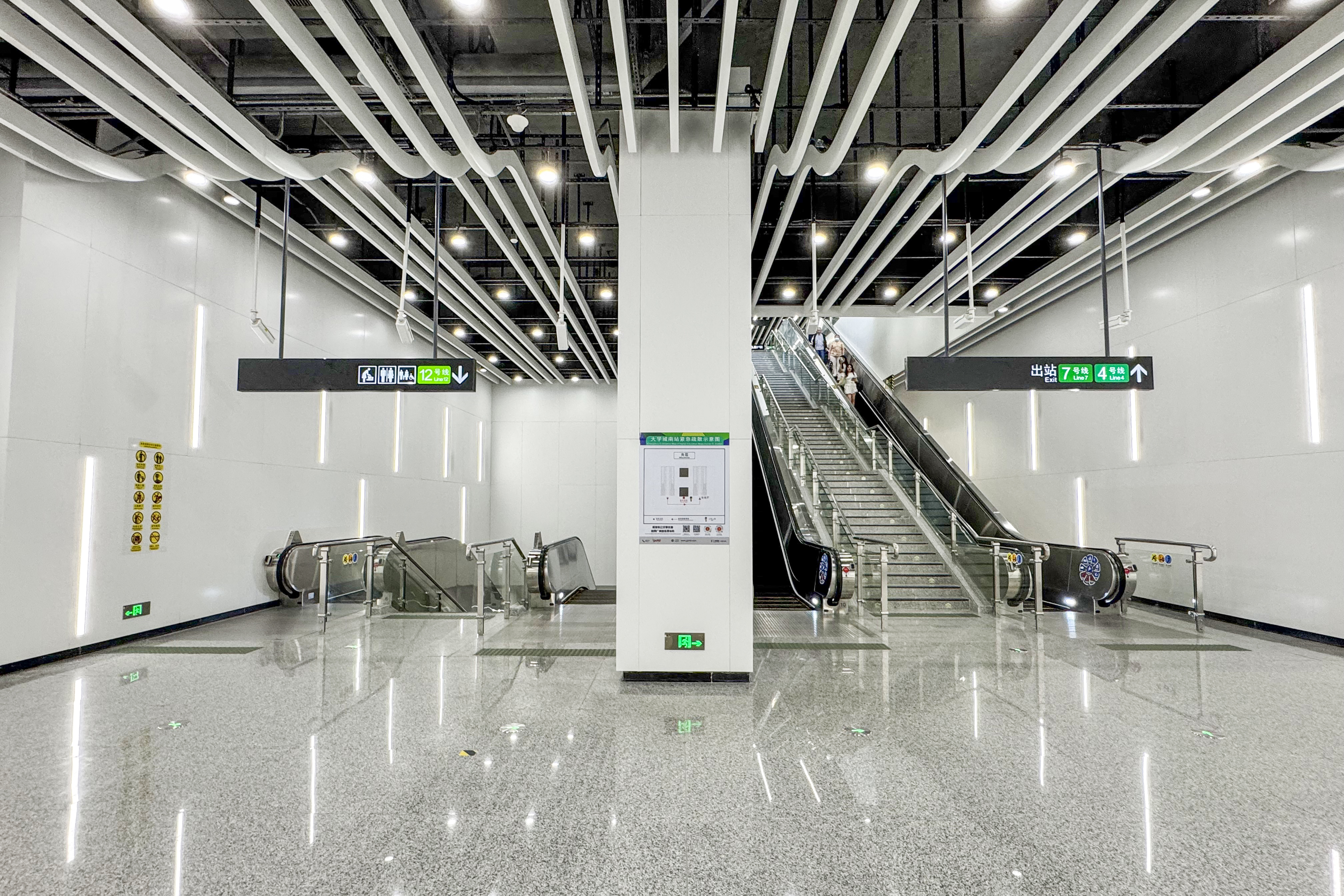
Transfer level between Lines 4/7 and Line 12

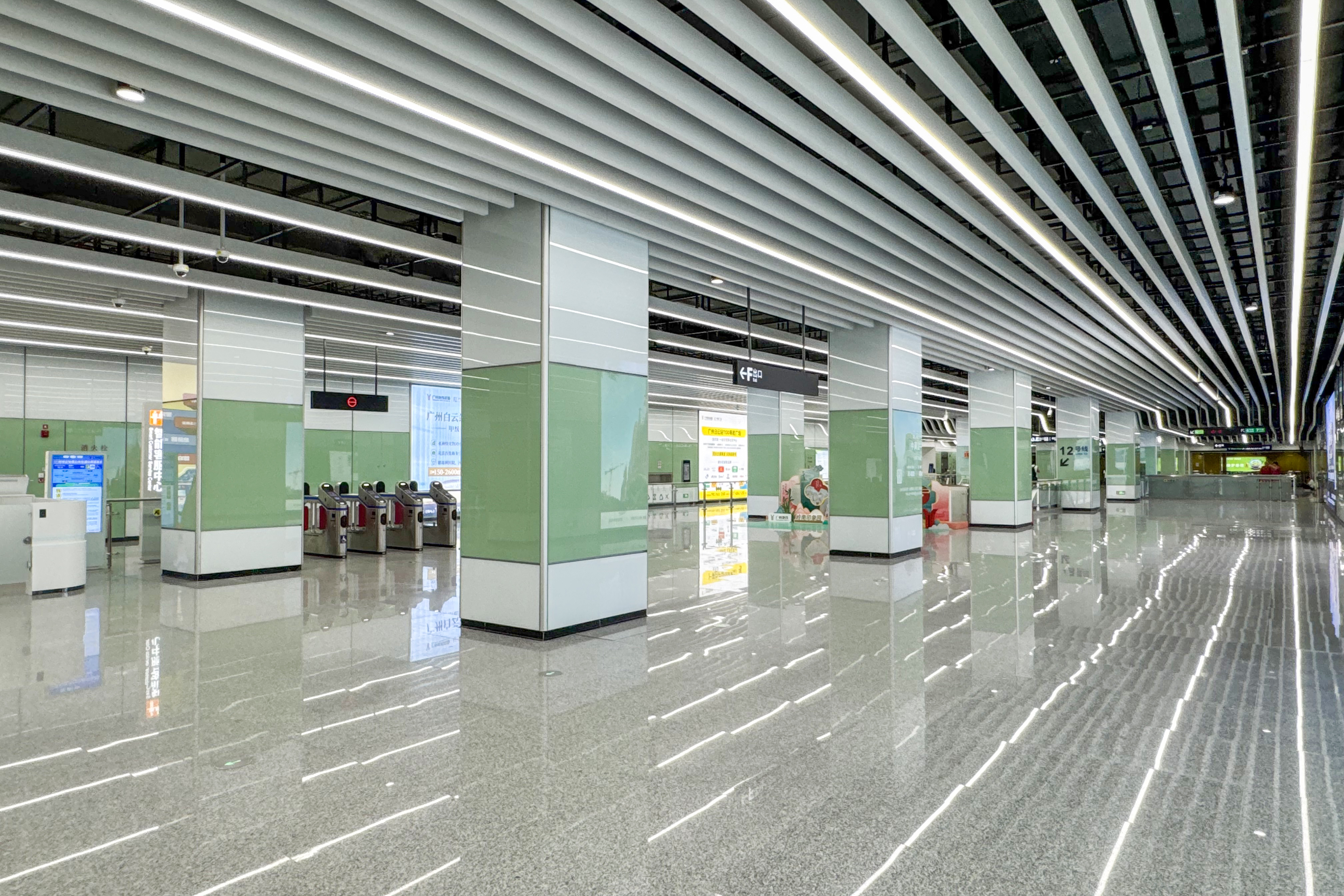
West concourse (Line 12 southwest section)

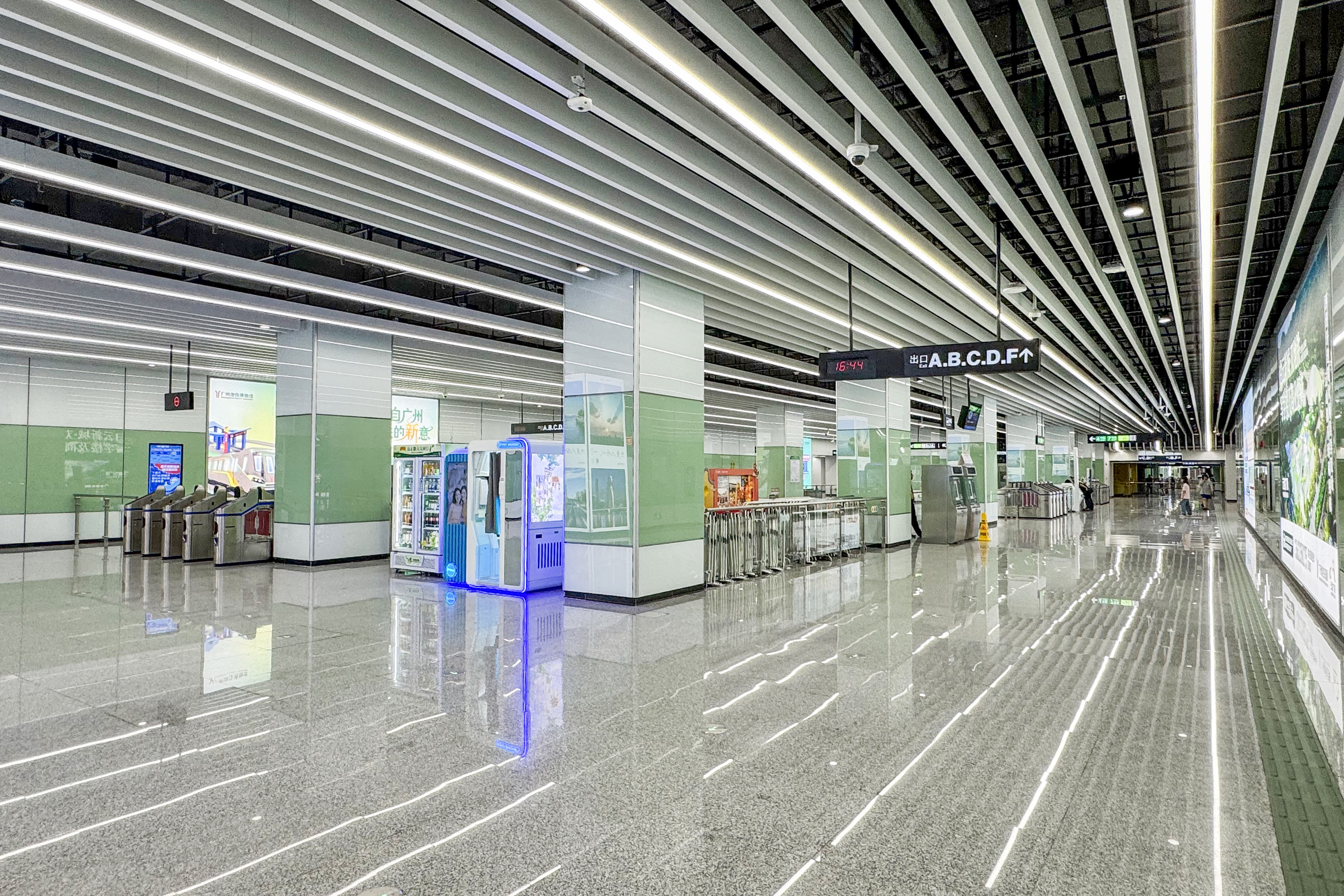
West concourse (Line 12 northwest section)

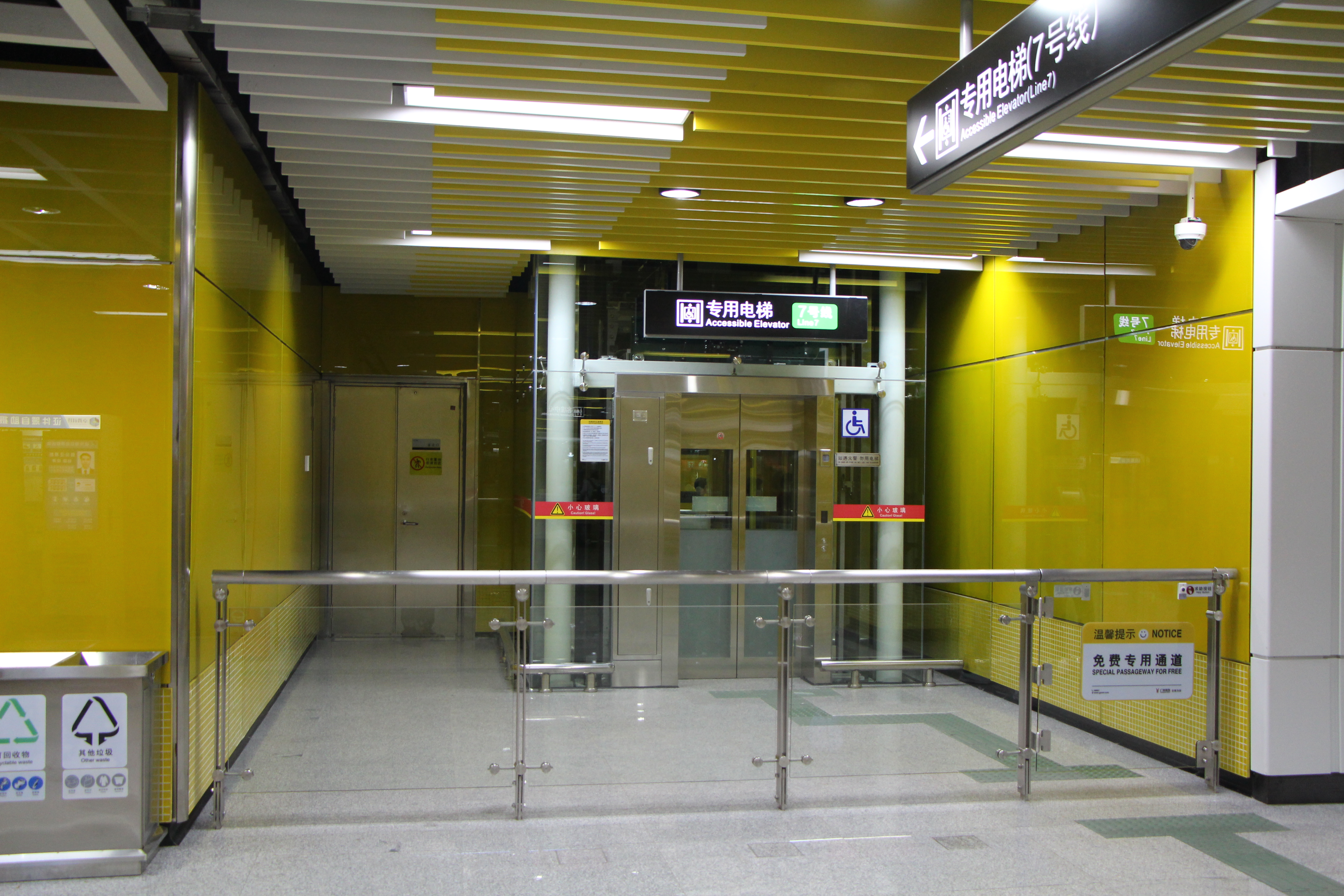
East concourse paid area elevator towards Line 7 platform

=== Transfer method ===
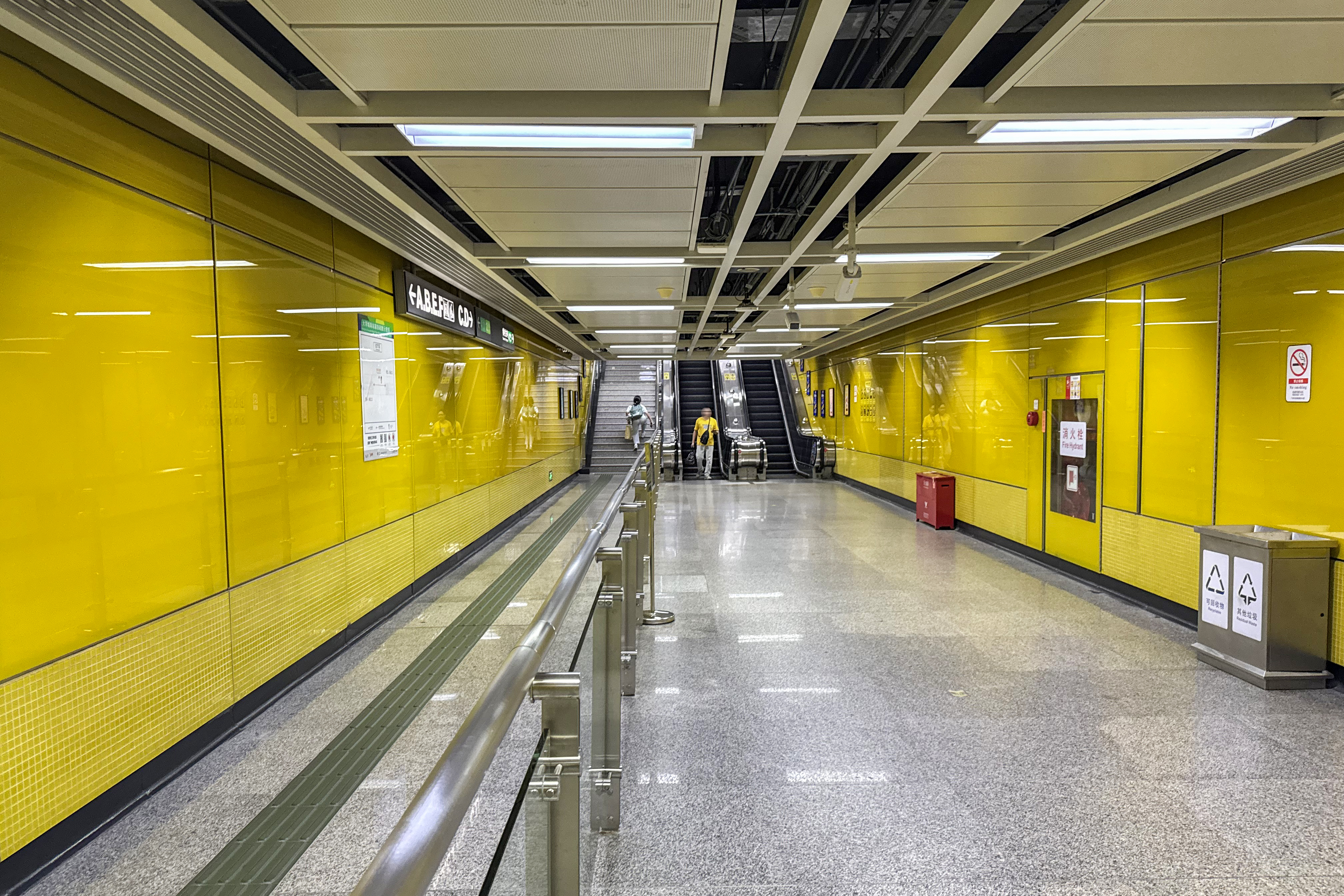
Line 4 under-track connecting passage, the side with the stairs is the non-paid area, and the side with the escalators is the paid area

The transfer between Lines 4 and 7 uses node transfer, accessible by stairs and escalators. Before the opening of Line 7, the two paid areas of Line 4 could not be connected because the station only opened a non-paid area passage between the two concourses. At that time, notices were placed in front of the entrance to remind passengers of the direction of travel. If a passenger accidentally chooses to enter the station in the wrong paid area, he or she can only seek help from the station staff and go to the other concourse through the non-paid area passage or take a train to the next station before switching to the right direction. After the opening of Line 7, the concourses are connected through the paid area via the Line 7 platform.

Transferring between Line 12 and other lines is accessible through the west concourse, using escalators, stairs and elevators for Line 4 in the direction of Nansha Passenger Port. Transferring to Line 7 is accessed via escalators, stairs and elevators in middle part of the west concourse. However, transferring to Line 4 in the direction of Huangcun requires passing through the Line 7 platform or the connecting passage towards the east concourse.

=== Platforms ===
Line 4 has two side platforms located under Higher Education Mega Center Main South Street. Line 7 has an island platform located under Central Road. Line 12 has an island platform located under the west side of Higher Education Mega Center Main South Street. The three-line platform is formed into a "卄" shape. Line 4 is on the top deck; Line 7 is on the middle deck and Line 12 is on the bottom deck.

Due to design reasons, the platform part of Line 4 is the same as Wanshengwei, and the range of screen doors installed on the platform is longer than that required for the 4-car L train type, so the driver needs to open the shield push door to look out on the platform when stopping and loading.

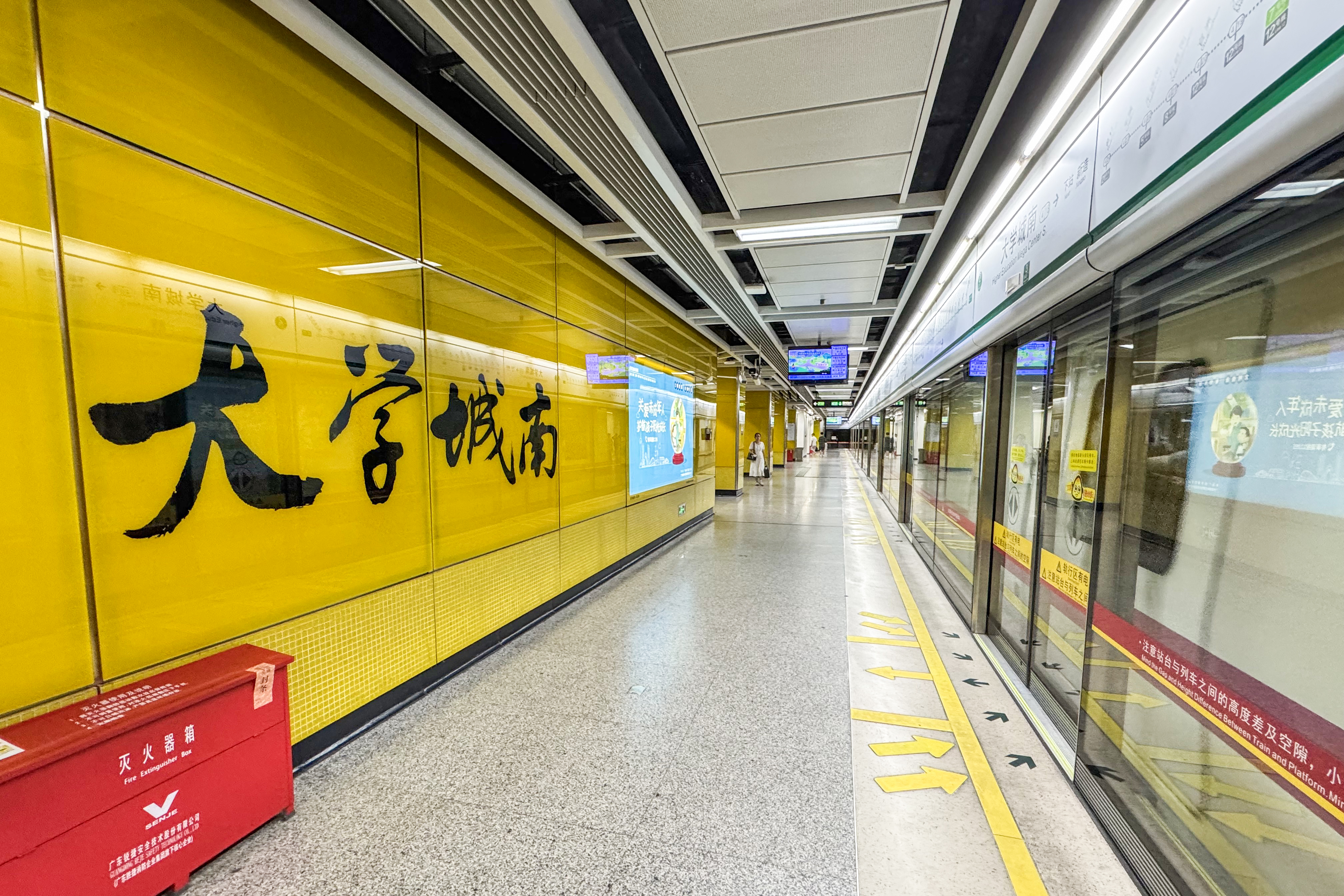
Line 4 platform 2 (towards Nansha Passenger Port)

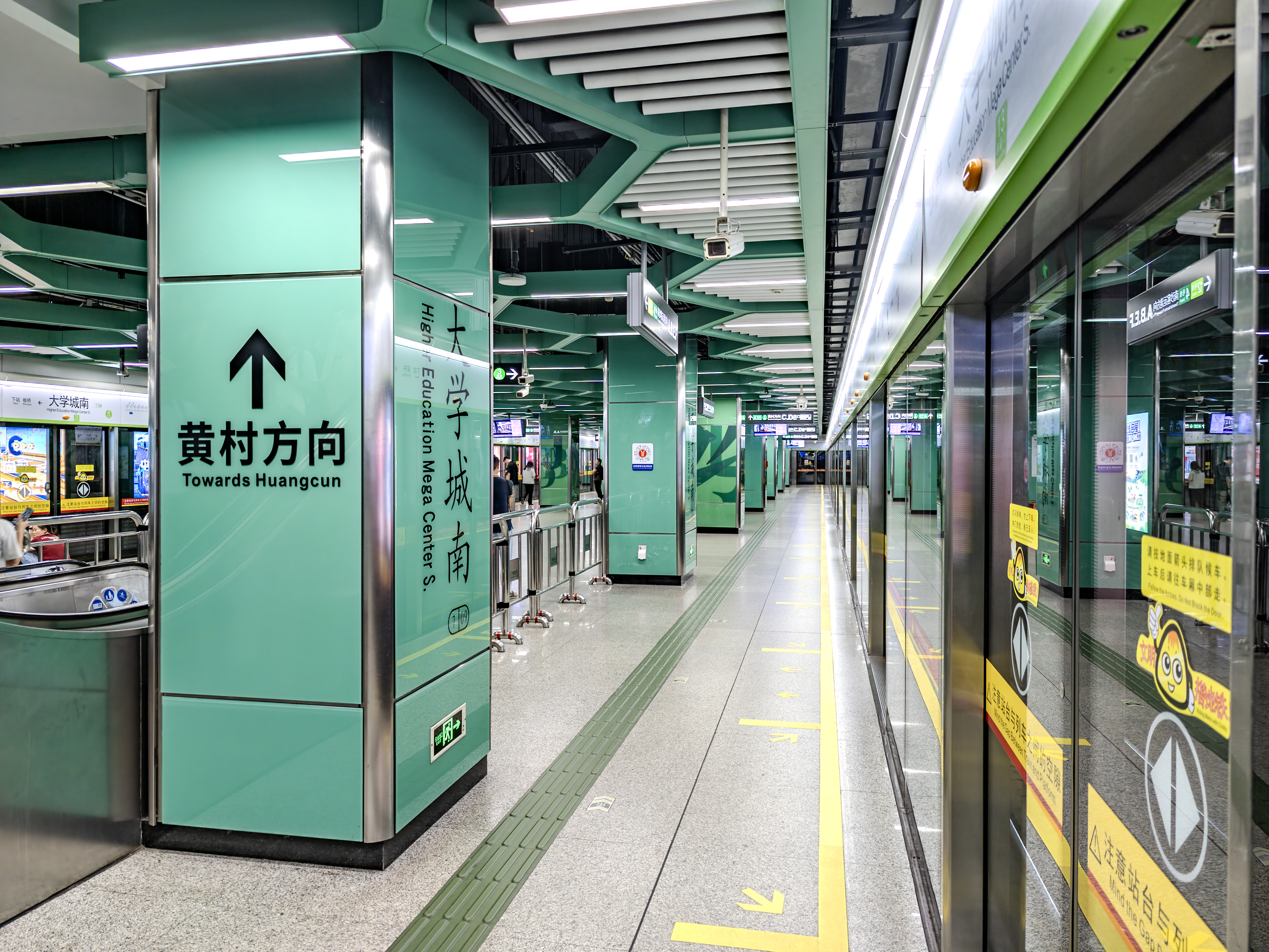
Line 7 platform 3 (towards Meidi Dadao)

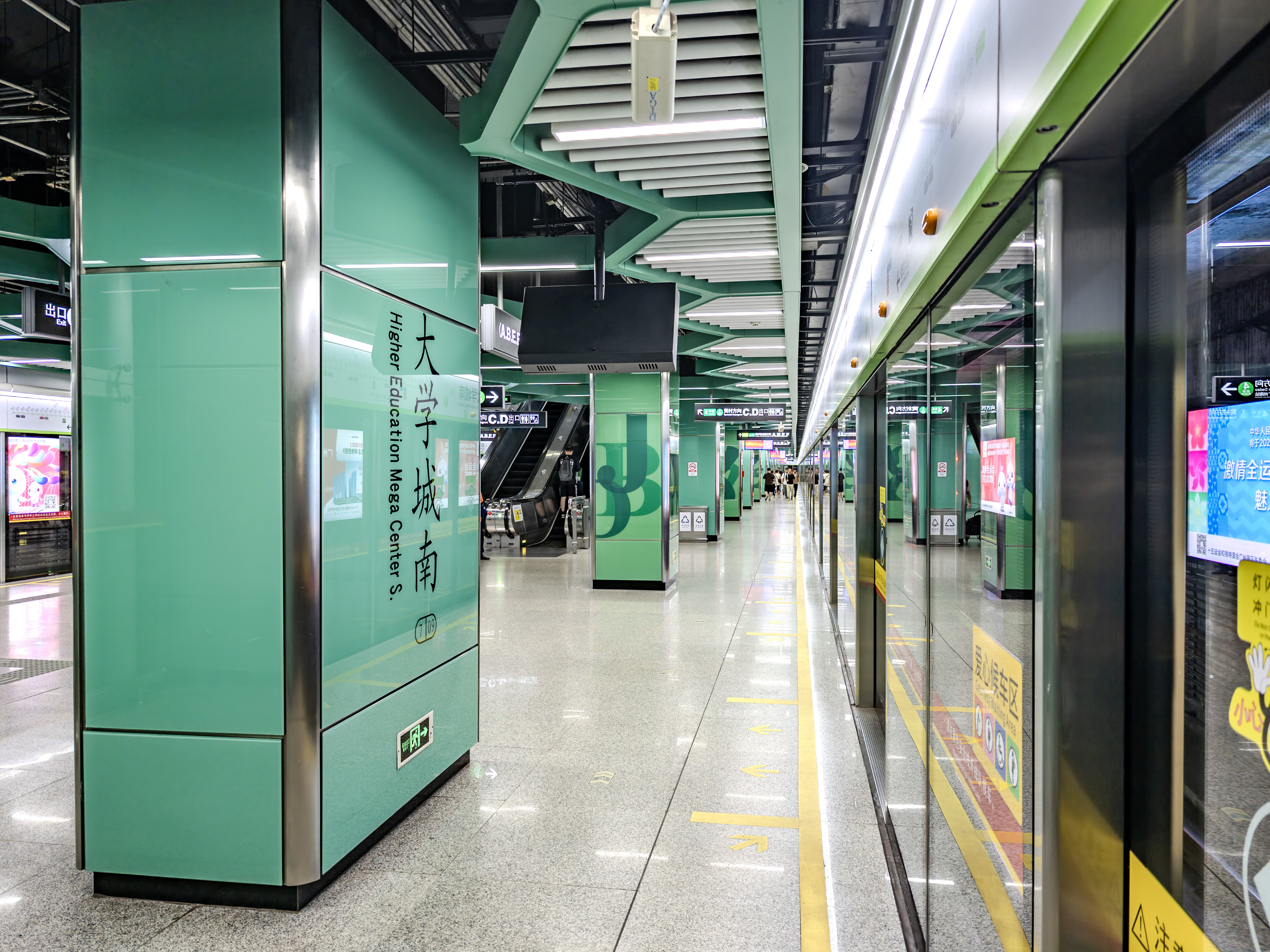
Line 7 platform 4 (towards Yanshan)

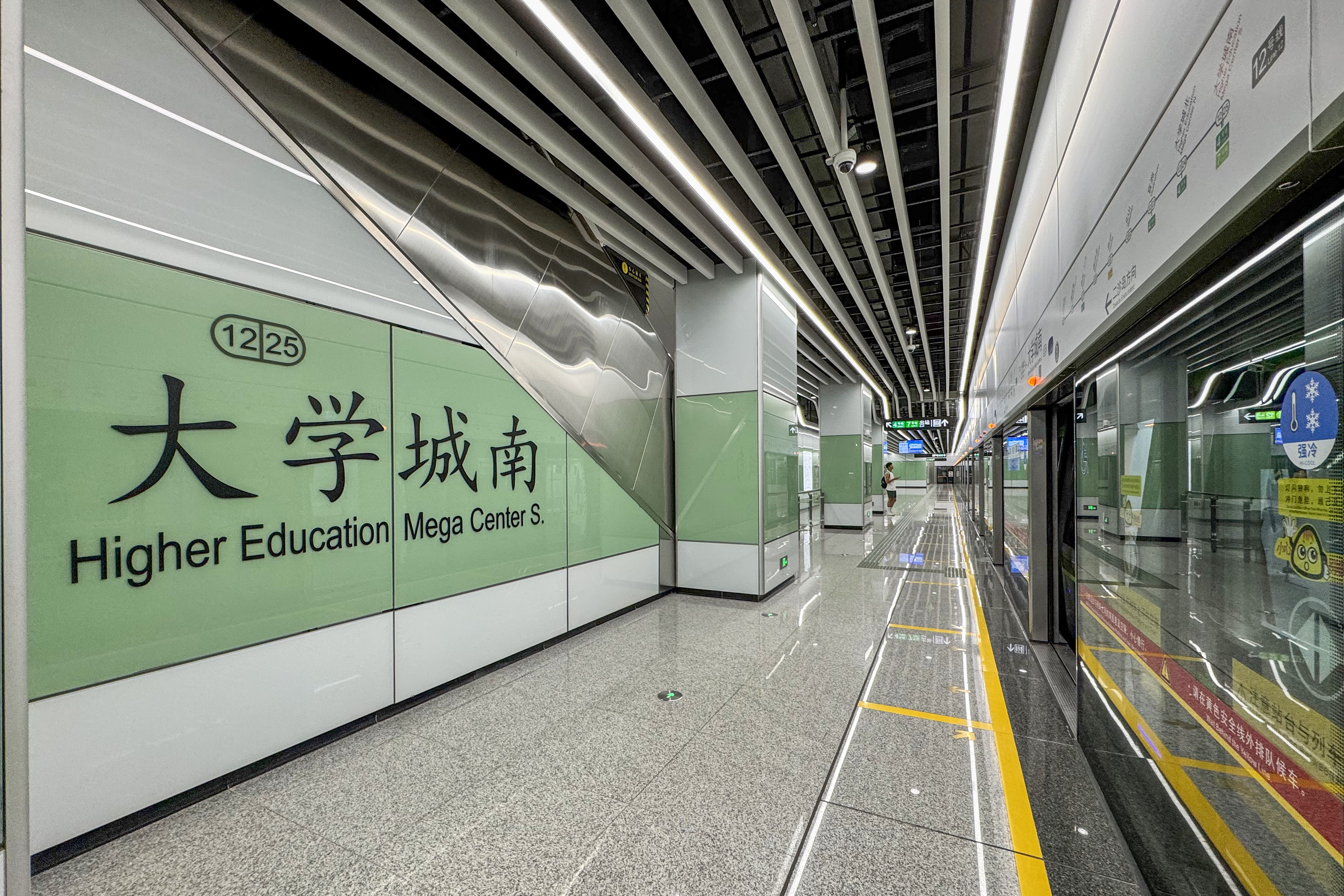
Line 12 platform 6 (towards Ersha Island)

=== Line configuration ===
There is a manouvering line at the south end of the Line 4 platforms. When there is a breakdown in the southern section after Xinzao, the train bound for Nansha Passenger Port will turn back through the storage line and use this station as the temporary terminal station. Before the opening of Line 7 Phase 2, the crossing line in the direction of Banqiao is used by the train to turnback before the station under special circumstances, and the crossing line in the direction of Shenjing is used for the train to turnback after the station during normal operation.

There is a connecting line between Line 4 and Line 7 to the southeast of the station.

There is a single manouvering line at the northwest end of the Line 12 platform for turnback in front of the station. At the southeastern end, there will be an access line to and from the Higher Education Mega Center South Stabling Yard, and there will also be a crossover line for all trains operating on Line 12 to turnback after the station, and at the end of the main line, there will be a reservation for extending to the south.

=== Entrances/exits ===
The station has 6 points of entry/exit, shared between the east and west concourses. The west concourse comprises Exits A, B, E and F, whilst the east concourse comprises Exits C and D. In the initial opening of Line 4, there were four exits lettered A to D, of which because of construction of the Line 12 station Exits A and B were rebuilt, and Exits E and F were opened when Line 12 started operations.

==== West concourse ====
- A: Central Ring West Road
- B: Central Ring West Road, Lingnan Impression Garden
- E: Central Ring East Road
- F: Central Ring East Road

==== East concourse ====
- C: Central South Street, South China University of Technology
- D: Central South Street

Exit D is equipped with a stairlift, Exit E is equipped with an elevator.

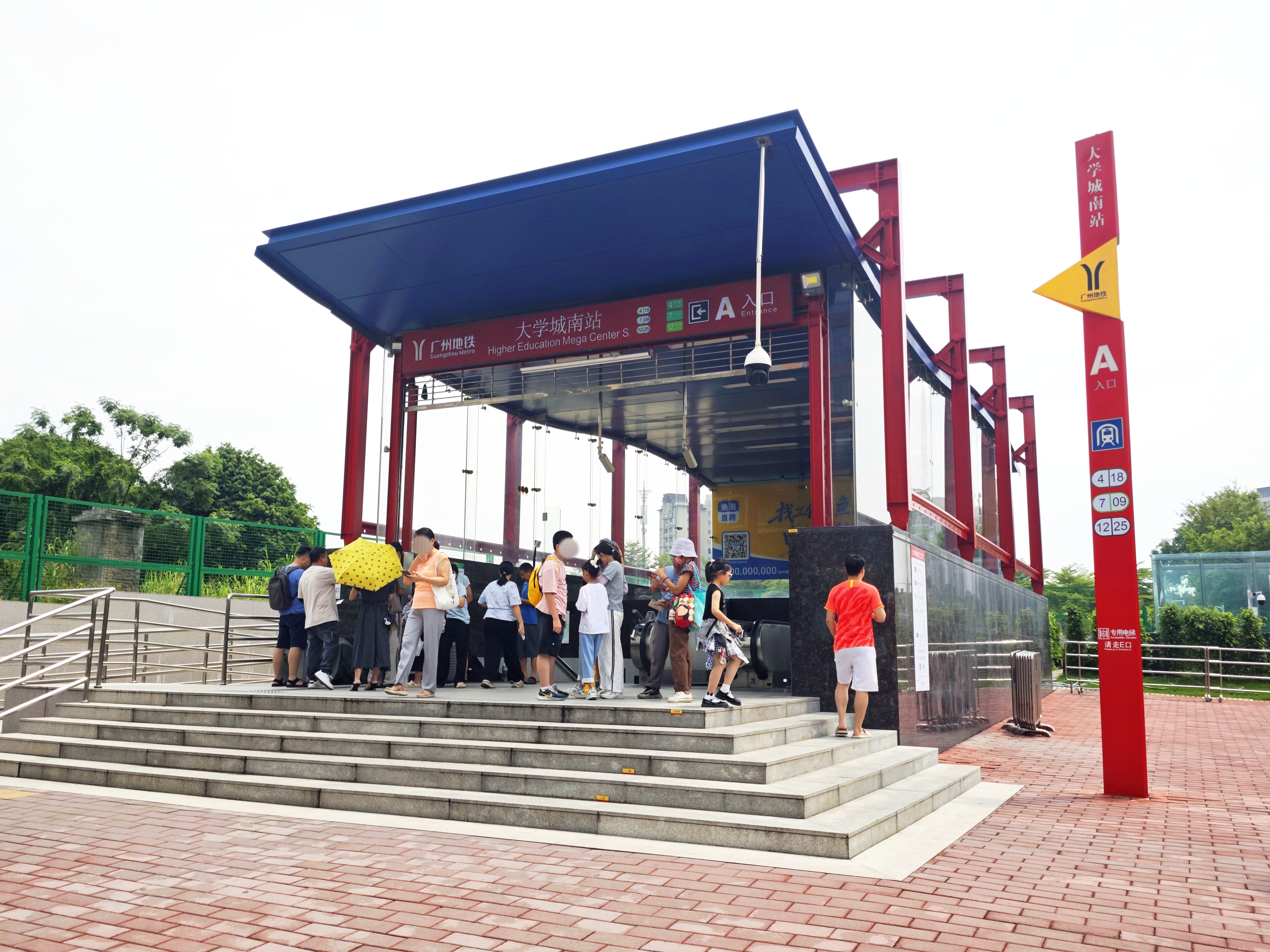
Entrance A

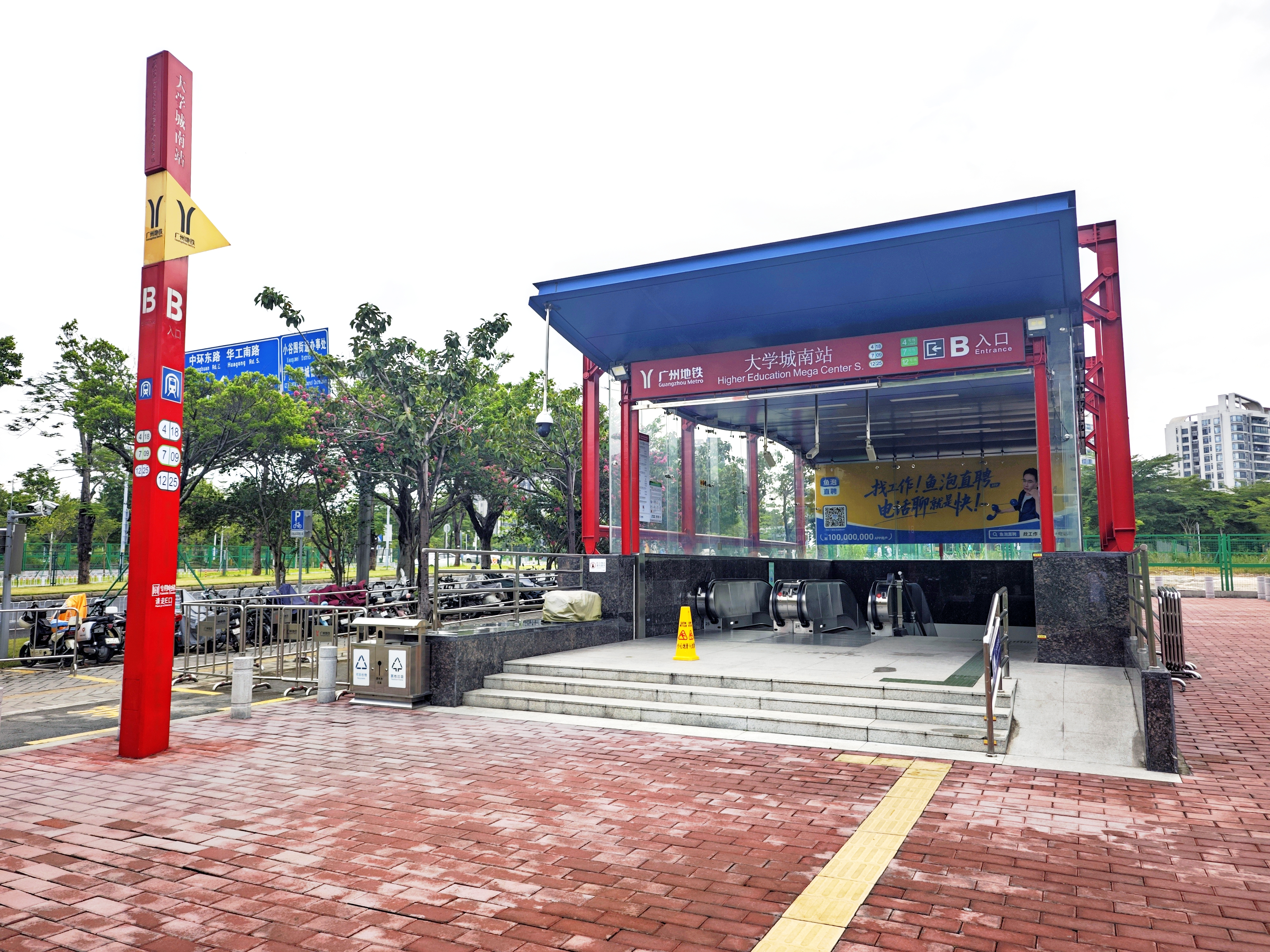
Entrance B

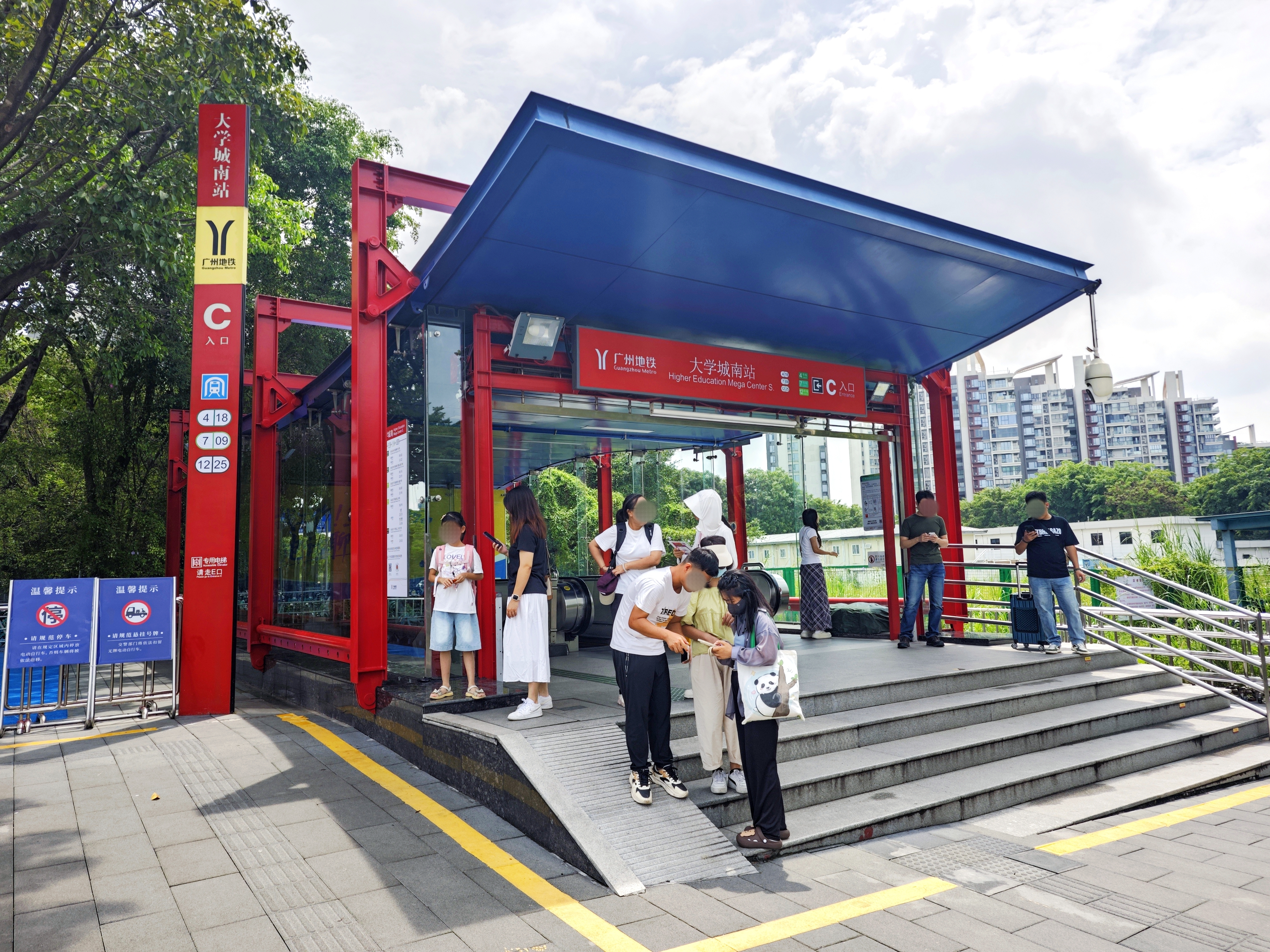
Entrance C

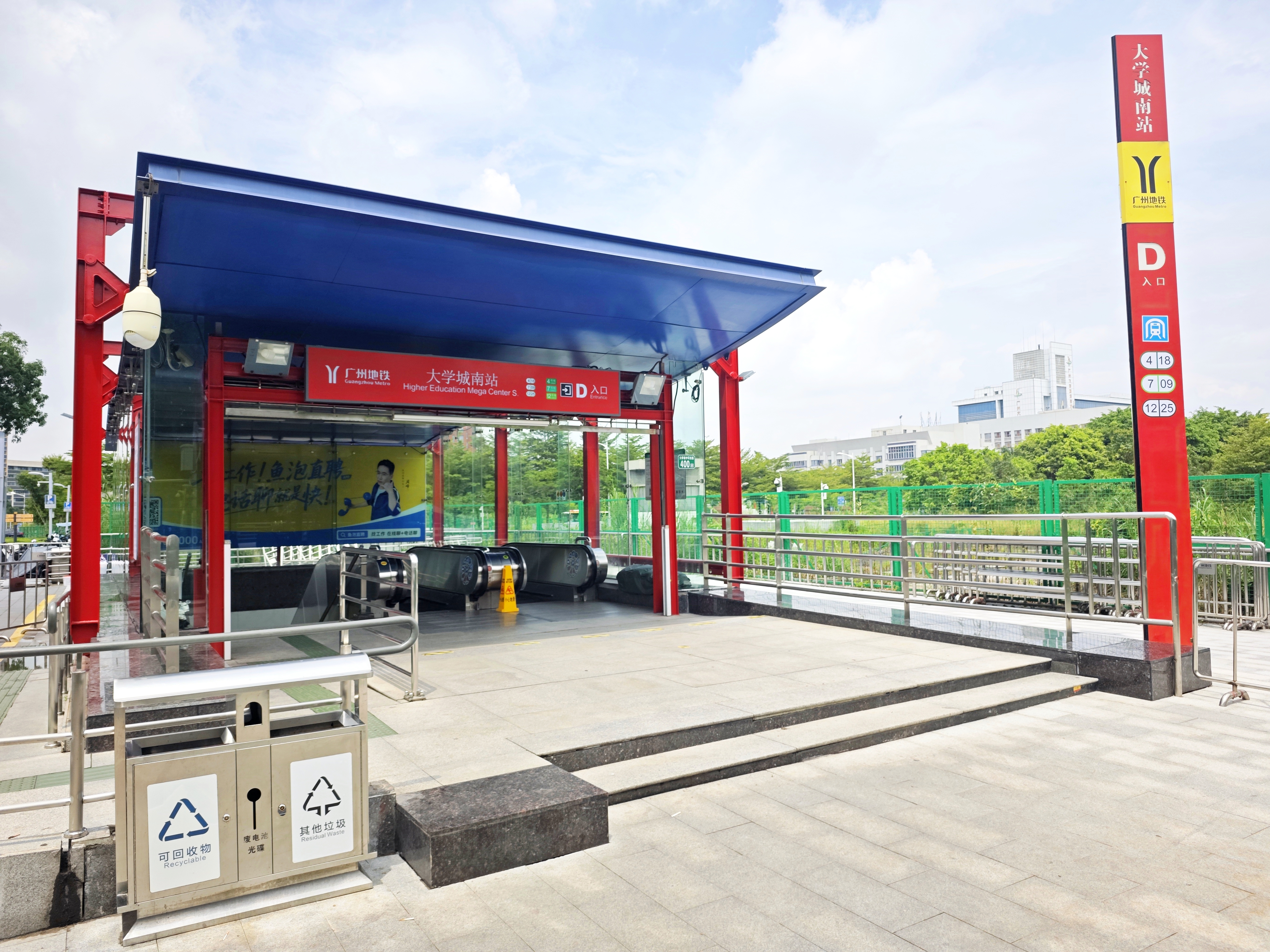
Entrance D

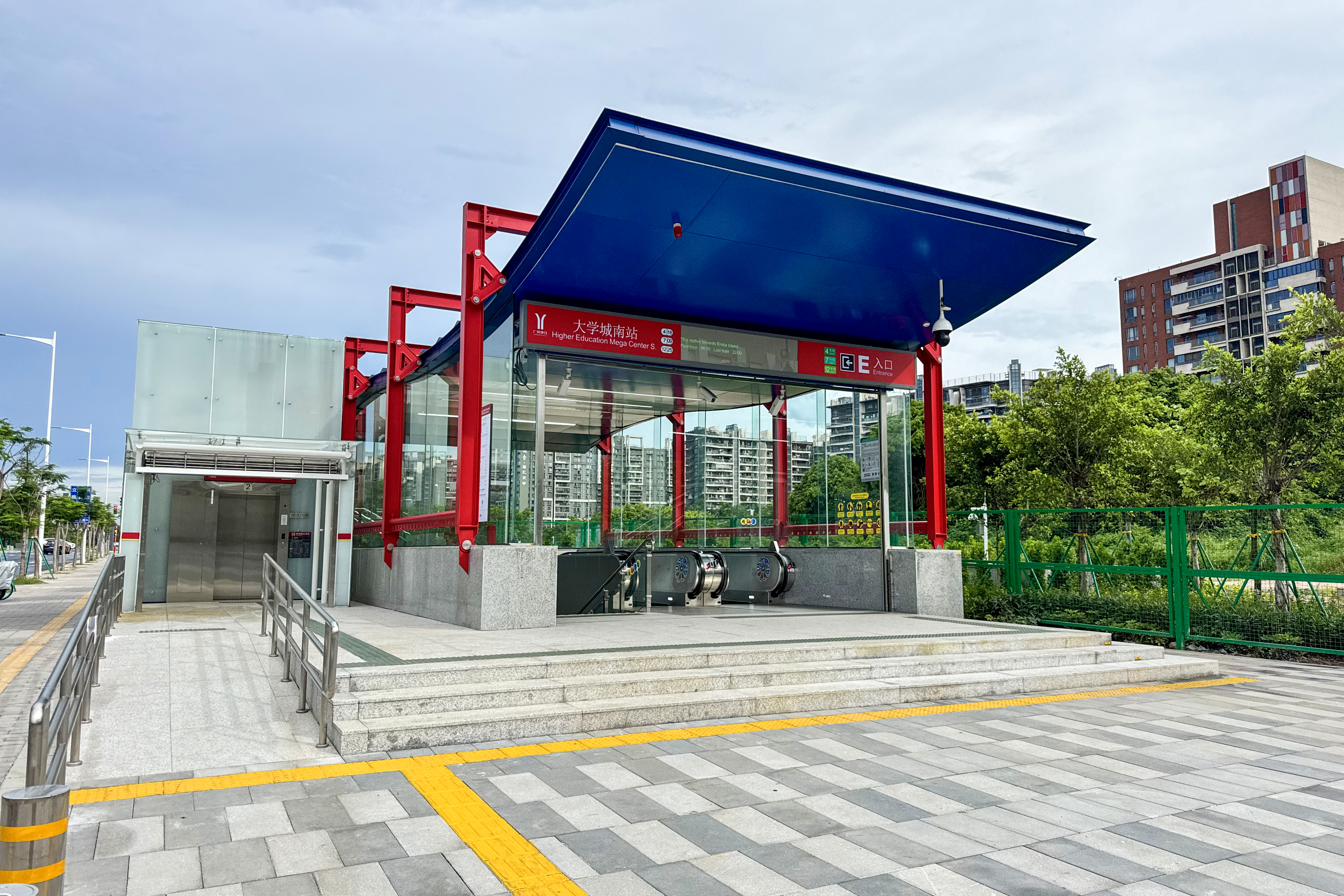
Entrance E

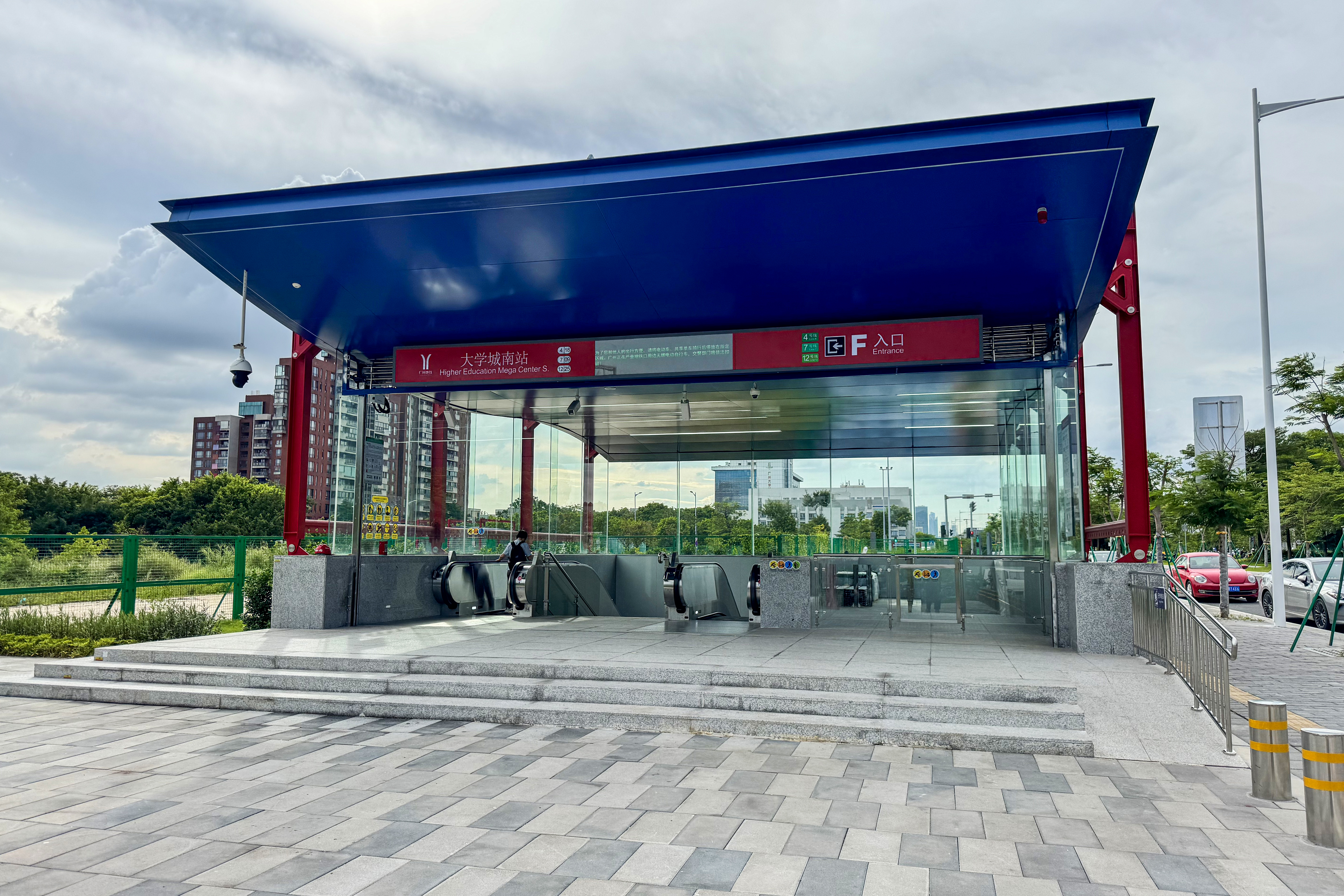
Entrance F

== History ==
=== Planning ===
The station first appeared in the "Near-Term Online Network Planning Implementation Adjustment Plan" in 2000, as one of the intermediate stations of the newly emerged Line 4 and at the same time one of the supporting stations of the Higher Education Mega Center, when the station was named Xiaoguwei station. Subsequently, the station was included in the first section of Line 4 (Higher Education Mega Center Line) project and was constructed in advance.

In the 2003 plan, the station was built in mind with a transfer to Line 7, so the station was built together with the platform of Line 7 and the connecting tunnel of the two lines. During this period, the planning of Line 7 was adjusted, and the interchange station with Line 4 was changed to Xinzao. Later, in the 2010 plan, Line 7 was finally confirmed to be intersected with Line 4 at this station, and at the same time, this station was also confirmed as the terminal station of the first phase of Line 7.

In 2008, when it was planned, this station also became Line 12's southern terminus. In the 2015 plan, Line 12 will no longer continue to this station after passing through Higher Education Mega Center North, and the terminal station will be adjusted to the Science Center. In 2017, the plan reverted to having this station as the terminus and was eventually implemented.

=== Construction ===
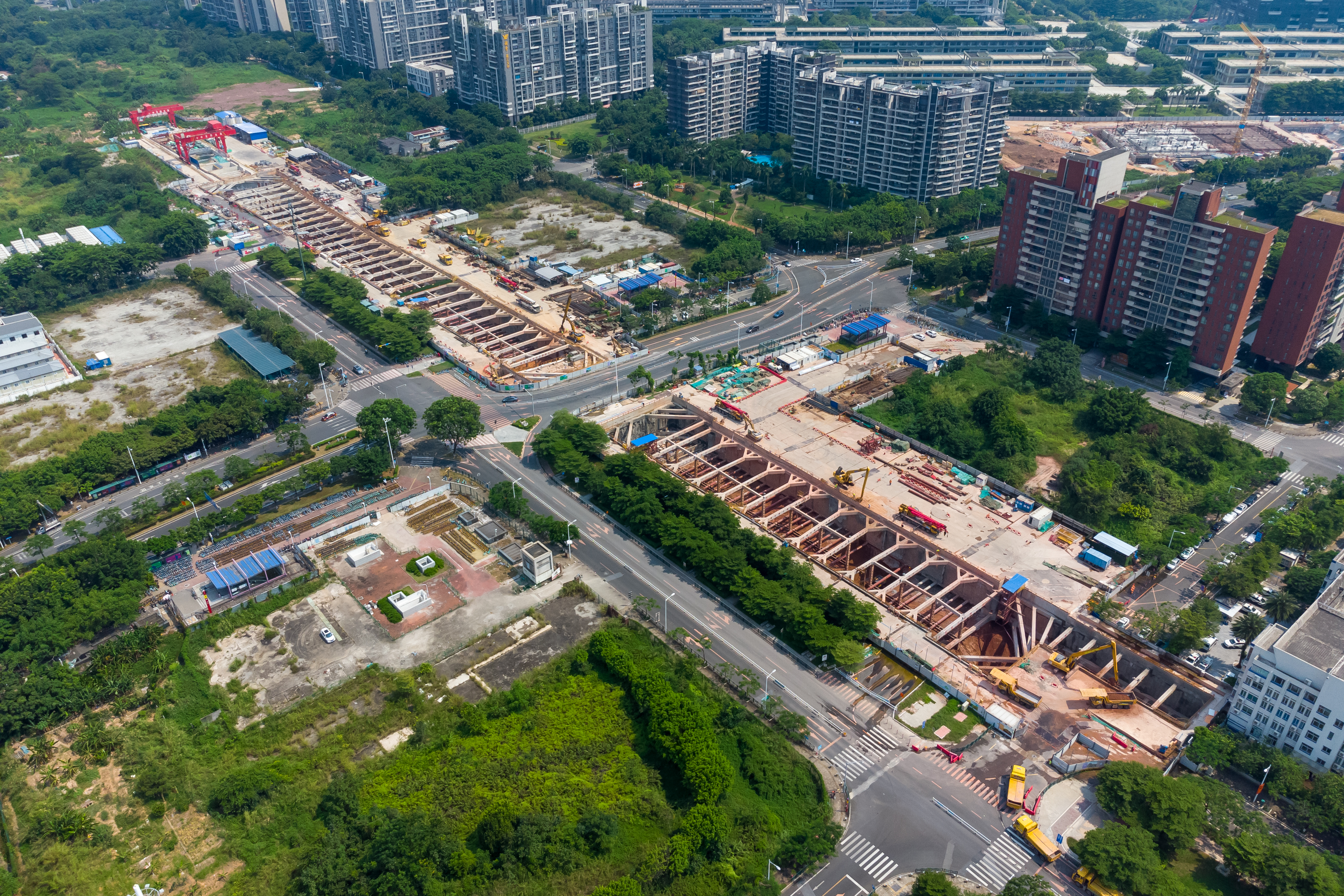
Line 12 construction site (July 2022)

In 2003, construction of the station began with the first section of Line 4. On 6 January 2004, the civil works of the connecting line between the University Town Line (Line 4) and Line 7 began. On 11 January 2005, the roof slab was sealed.

At the time of construction of Line 4, the platform of Line 7 and the interchange point had been reserved at this station. Line 7 was originally planned to use 4-car L type trains, so only 85 meters of platform was reserved, but due to the final decision of Line 7 to use 6-car B type trains, the reserved platform of Line 7 had to be extended. During the construction of Line 7, the reserved platform was extended to meet the new requirements. At the same time, the original east concourse of Line 4 was also renovated, the payment area was reset, and part of the equipment area was made public to extend the non-paid area of the concourse. At the same time, the construction of Line 7 required the installation of toilets in the station in accordance with the new national standards, so Exit C was temporarily closed from 30 October 2015 until the opening of the Line 7 station on 28 December 2016.

The station section of Line 12 was partially enclosed in August 2019. On 28 September 2020, Exit A was temporarily closed to meet the construction needs of Line 12, reopened at the end of that year, and then closed again on May 16, 2021. Exit B was closed on 20 December 2020, and the two entrances/exits needed to be removed because they were located within the construction of the Line 12 station structure. It was rebuilt on both sides of the Mingzhi Street intersection and reopened on 1 January 2022 after completion. On 28 February 2025, the Line 12 station completed the "three powers" transfer.

At the beginning of design of the Line 12 station, there was also a concourse on the upper floor of the south end of the platform of Line 12 leading to the east concourse, but Line 12 and Line 4 can be transferred between Guanzhou and this station, and a certain amount of transfer passenger flow can also be diverted, so the design was cancelled. In addition, on the eve of the opening of the Line 12 station, the existing non-paid area connecting the two concourses was also re-divided, and the side adjacent to the escalator was divided into a paid area to ease the flow of passengers between Line 12 and Line 4 in the direction of Huangcun, and at the same time expand the scope of the paid area of the existing east and west concourses.

=== Operation ===
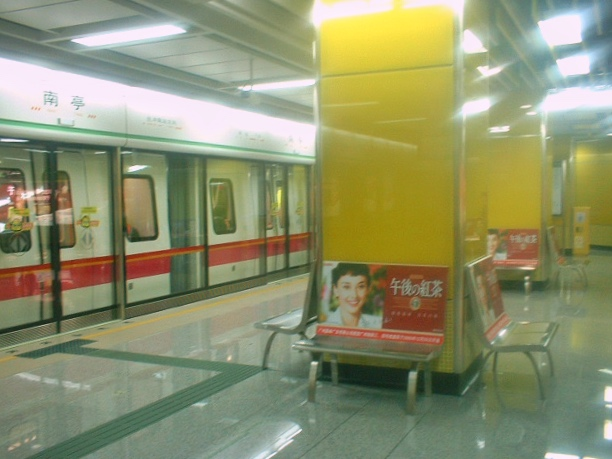
In the station's initial opening, the station platform was called Nanting Station, and the screen door was marked with "Nanting" and "Towards Chongwei Station", "Chongwei Station" was the former name of the current Jinzhou station

On the eve of the opening of the station, the station was renamed Nanting station. On 26 December 2005, the station was opened with the official opening of the first section of Line 4 (University Town Line), and the authorities held an opening ceremony at the station. In May 2006, the site was renamed Higher Education Mega Center South station.

On 28 December 2016, the first phase of Line 7 opened, and the Line 7 platform and the east concourse extension were officially opened. The station was the eastern terminus of Line 7 before the opening of Phase 2 on 28 December 2023. On 29 June 2025, the Line 12 station opened, thus becoming a three-line interchange station.

=== Incidents ===
On the morning of 15 July 2020, a large amount of mud suddenly poured into Exit A at the construction site of Line 12, causing it to be temporarily closed and restored soon after.

During COVID-19 pandemic control rules at the end of 2022, the station was affected by prevention and control measures and its exits were suspended from 28 November to the afternoon of 30 November. Only transfers between lines were retained.
