= Xiaoguwei =

Island of Panyu, Guangzhou, China

Coordinates: 23°3′8.3″N 113°23′21.27″E

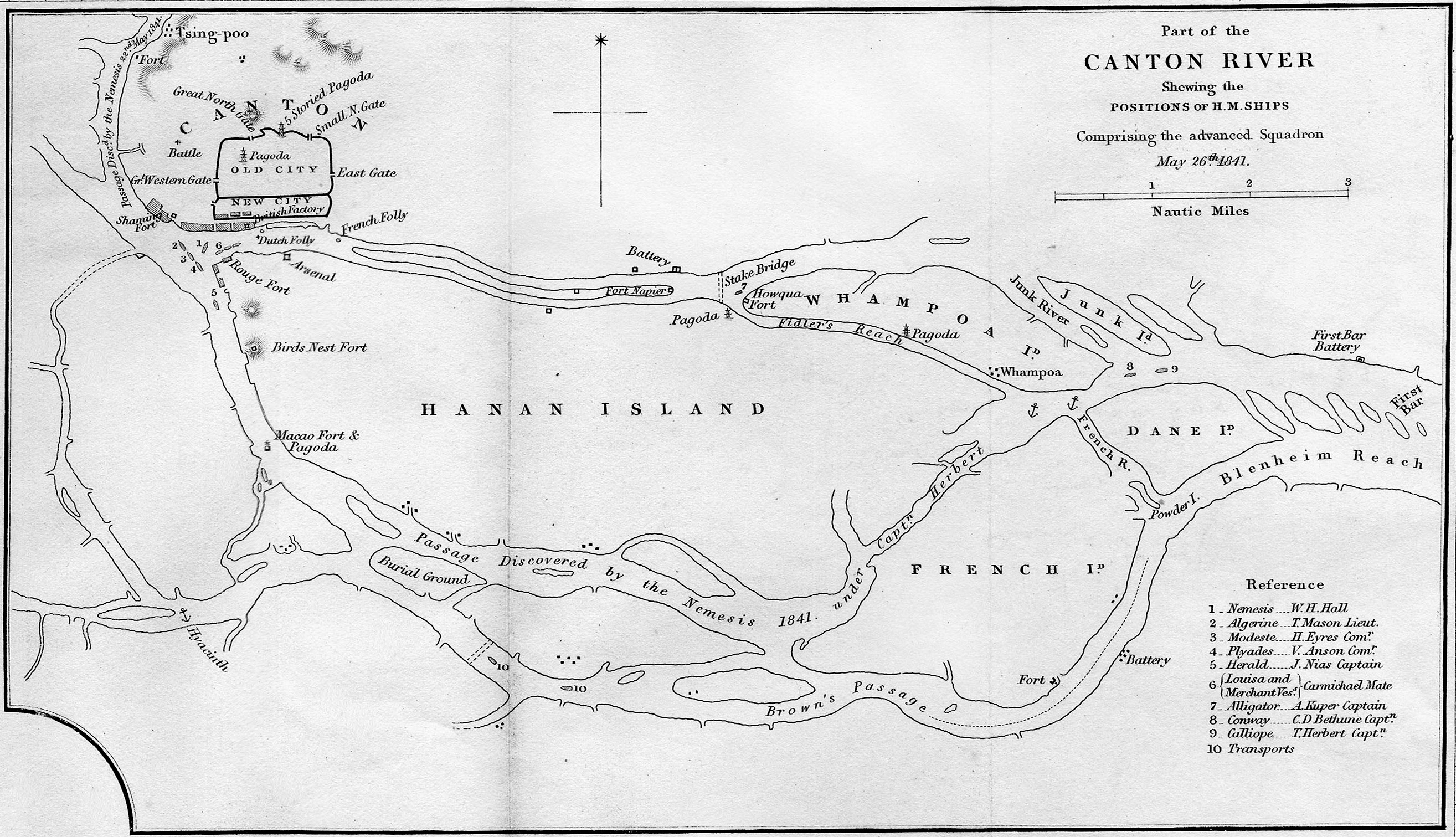
- "Part of the Canton River" in 1841, a map showing Guangzhou and its surrounding islands during the First Opium War. Xiaoguwei Island ("French Is.") lies in the southeast, Changzhou Island ("Dane Is.") to its north, Henan Island ("Honam Is.") to its west, and Pazhou Island ("Whampoa Is.") to its northwest.
- Traditional Chinese: 小谷圍島
- Simplified Chinese: 小谷围岛
- Postal: French Island
Transcriptions
Standard Mandarin
- Hanyu Pinyin: Xiǎogǔwéi Dǎo
Yue: Cantonese
- Jyutping: siu2 guk1 wai4 dou2

Xiaoguwei Island, formerly known in English as French Island, is an island in the Pearl River Delta in Guangdong Province, China. It is administered as Xiaoguwei Subdistrict, a subdistrict in Panyu District, Guangzhou. The Guangzhou Higher Education Mega Center now occupies the entire island.

== Geography ==
Xiaoguwei is about 17.9 km^{2} (6.9 sq mi).

== History ==
During the Canton trade, Xiaoguwei was used by French crews for repairs and burials. It lay on the southeastern side of the Huangpu or "Whampoa" anchorage. French access to Guangzhou was, however, frequently blocked by the British Navy amid its colonial, revolutionary, and Napoleonic Wars.

== Transportation ==
Xiaoguwei is connected with Luntou (仑头) in Haizhu District by tunnel. Bridges on the Nansha Port Expressway, a toll road, links it to Henan Island (Haizhu District) in the west and the rest of Panyu District to the south. A third bridge connects it to Haizhu's Yingzhou Ecological Park and a fourth to Huangpu District's Changzhou Island in the northeast.

Dozens of bus routes cross the island and connect its universities with downtown Guangzhou, the most important of which is Bus 381, which connects every university to the two subway stations. There are regular buses and express commuter buses using the toll roads and having fewer stops. Many of the express buses connect different campuses of the island's universities. In addition to these routes, some universities offer their own shuttle services for their faculty and staff.

=== Metro stations ===
The Guangzhou Metro has two stations on the Xiaoguwei Island.

- Higher Education Mega Center North station (Line 4 & Line 12)
- Higher Education Mega Center South station (Line 4, Line 7 & Line 12)
