= Xinghai Conservatory of Music =

Music school in Guangzhou, China

- 星海音乐学院 (Chinese)
- Motto: 求真、尚美、崇德、敬业
- Affiliations: Guangdong Province Office of Education
- Location: No. 398, Waihuan Xilu (Waihuan Rd. W.), HEMC, Panyu District, Guangzhou, Guangdong, China; 23.06055°N 113.37500°E
- Campus: 225,000 square metres (2,420,000 sq ft) (both campuses)
- Website: www.xhcom.edu.cn

Chinese name
- Simplified Chinese: 星海音乐学院
- Traditional Chinese: 星海音樂學院
Transcriptions
Standard Mandarin
- Hanyu Pinyin: Xīnghǎi Yīnyuè Xuéyuàn

The Xinghai Conservatory of Music, also known as the Xinghai Conservatory, is a music conservatory in Guangzhou City, Guangdong Province, China. It has two campuses: one in the Guangzhou Higher Education Mega Center in Panyu District, another at No. 48, Xianlie Donglu (Xianlie Rd. E. 23.14978°N 113.30412°E), Tianhe District. The conservatory was established in 1932 by the composer Ma Sicong as the Guangzhou Conservatory of Music.

Both the Xinghai Conservatory of Music and the Xinghai Concert Hall are named after the noted composer Xian Xinghai (Chinese: 冼星海), who died on October 30, 1945, at the age of 40.

== See also ==
- Beijing Midi School of Music
- Central Conservatory of Music
