= Changzhou Island =

Island in the Pearl River

Coordinates: 23°04′52″N 113°24′48″E

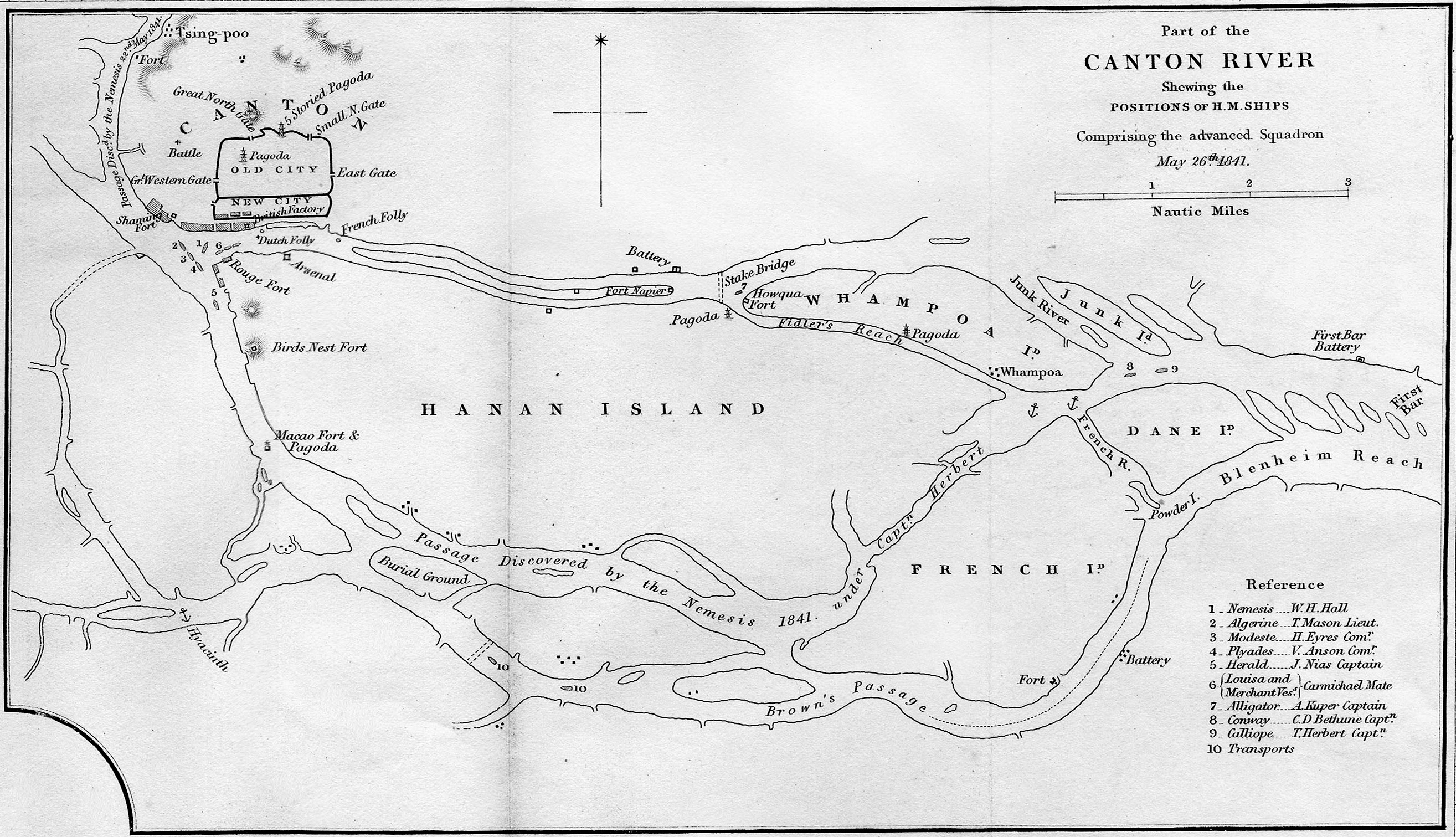
- "Part of the Canton River" in 1841, a map showing Guangzhou and its surrounding islands during the First Opium War. Changzhou ("Dane Is.") lies in the east, Xiaoguwei ("French Is.") to its south, and Pazhou ("Whampoa Is.") to its northwest.
- Traditional Chinese: 長洲島
- Simplified Chinese: 长洲岛
- Postal: Dane's Island
Transcriptions
Standard Mandarin
- Hanyu Pinyin: Chángzhōudǎo
Yue: Cantonese
- Jyutping: Coeng4 zau1 dou2

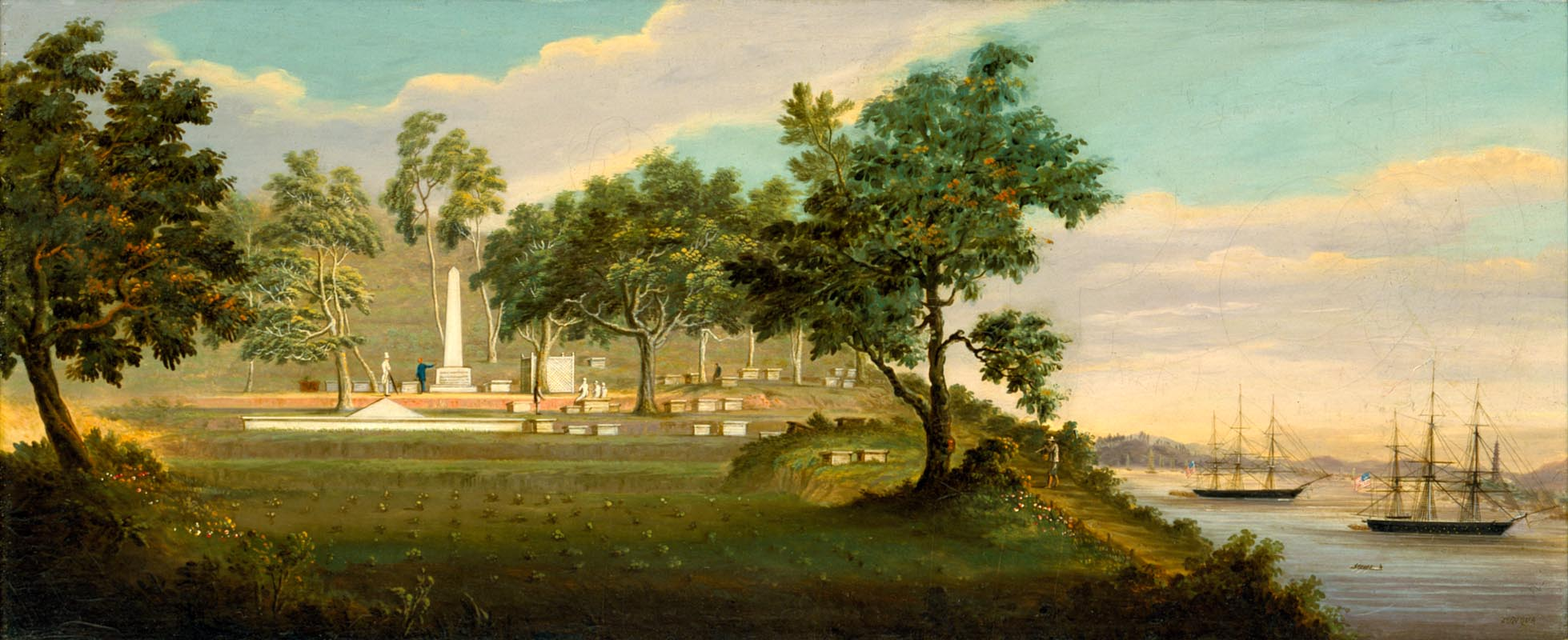
Sunqua's c. 1840 View of the Foreign Cemetery on Dane's Island

Changzhou Island, formerly known in English as Dane or Dane's Island, is an island in the Pearl River Delta of China's Guangdong Province. It is now administered as part of Guangzhou's Huangpu District, although the historic Huangpu Island was nearby Pazhou, which forms part of Haizhu District.

== Geography ==
Changzhou is about 11.5 km^{2} (4.4 sq mi), of which 8.5 km^{2} (3.3 sq mi) is dry land.

== History ==
During the Canton trade, Changzhou was used by Danish crews for repairs and burials. It lay on the eastern side of the Huangpu or "Whampoa" anchorage.

The island was the site of Sun Yat-sen's Whampoa Military Academy (est. 1924) and the 1926 Zhongshan Incident that propelled the academy's commandant Chiang Kai-shek to leadership over the Chinese Nationalists and then all of Warlord China.

== Transportation ==
Changzhou is now linked to Guangzhou's road network by a bridge to neighboring Xiaoguwei and will be served by the Phase II eastern extension of Guangzhou Metro Line 7.
