= Shiqi station (Guangzhou Metro) =

Guangzhou Metro station

Coordinates: 22°57′27″N 113°27′56″E

Shiqi 石碁
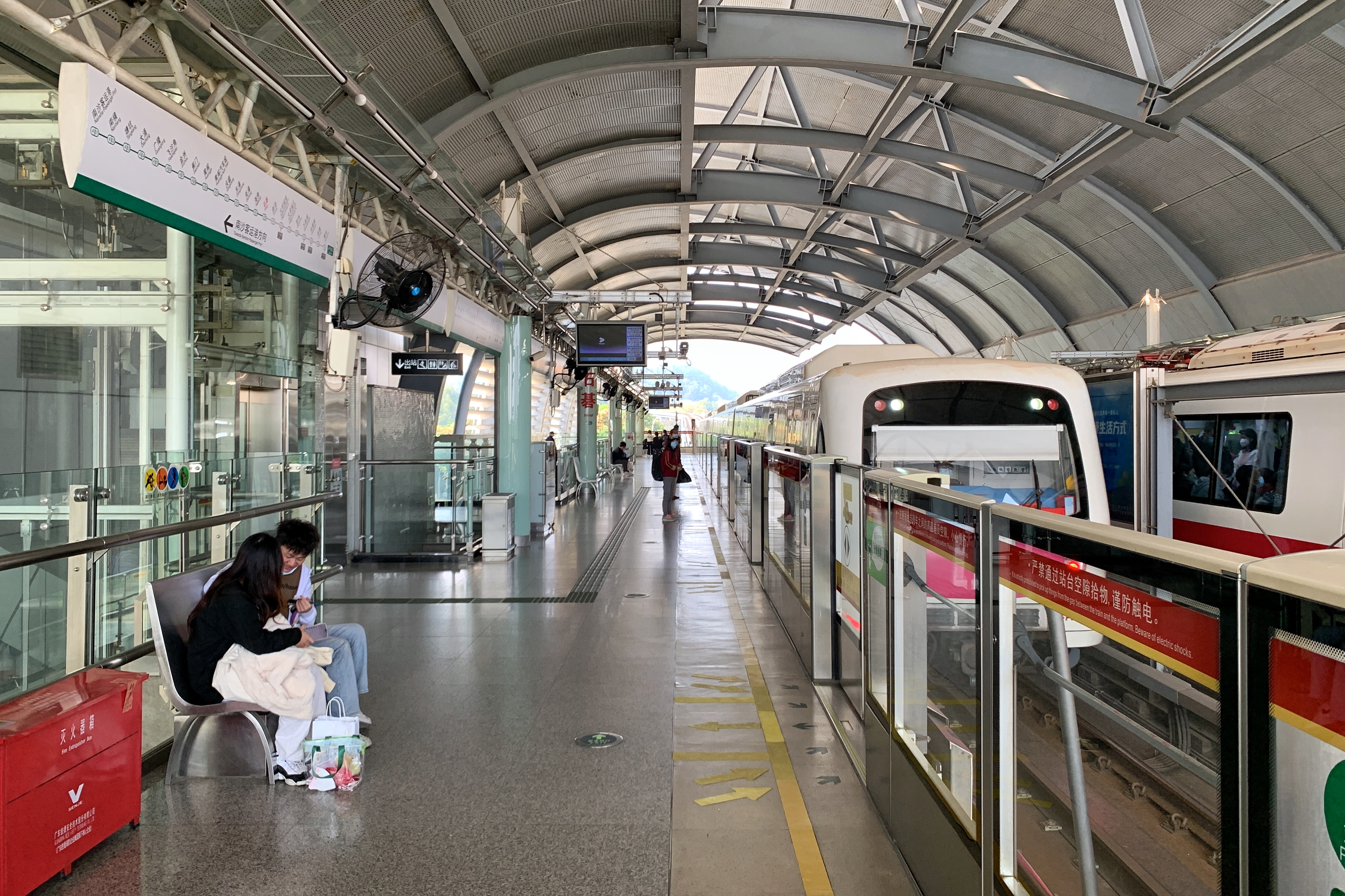
- Platform 2

Chinese name
- Chinese: 石碁站
Transcriptions
Standard Mandarin
- Hanyu Pinyin: Shíqí Zhàn
Yue: Cantonese
- Yale Romanization: Sehkgēi Jaahm
- Jyutping: Sek^{6}gei^{1} Zaam^{6}
- Hong Kong Romanization: Shek Kei station

General information
- Location: Panyu District, Guangzhou, Guangdong; China
- Operator: Guangzhou Metro Co. Ltd.
- Line: Line 4
- Platforms: 2 (2 side platforms)

Construction
- Structure type: Elevated

Other information
- Station code: 415

History
- Opened: 30 December 2006; 19 years ago

Services
| Preceding station | Guangzhou Metro | Following station |
|---|---|---|
| Xinzao towards Huangcun | Line 4 | Haibang towards Nansha Passenger Port |
Location

Shiqi Station (Chinese: 石碁站; Cantonese Yale: Sehkgēi Jaahm) is an elevated station of Line 4 of the Guangzhou Metro. It started operations on 30 December 2006. It is located at the junction of Shilian Road and Jingzhu Expressway in Shiqi Town (石碁镇), Panyu District.

== Station layout ==
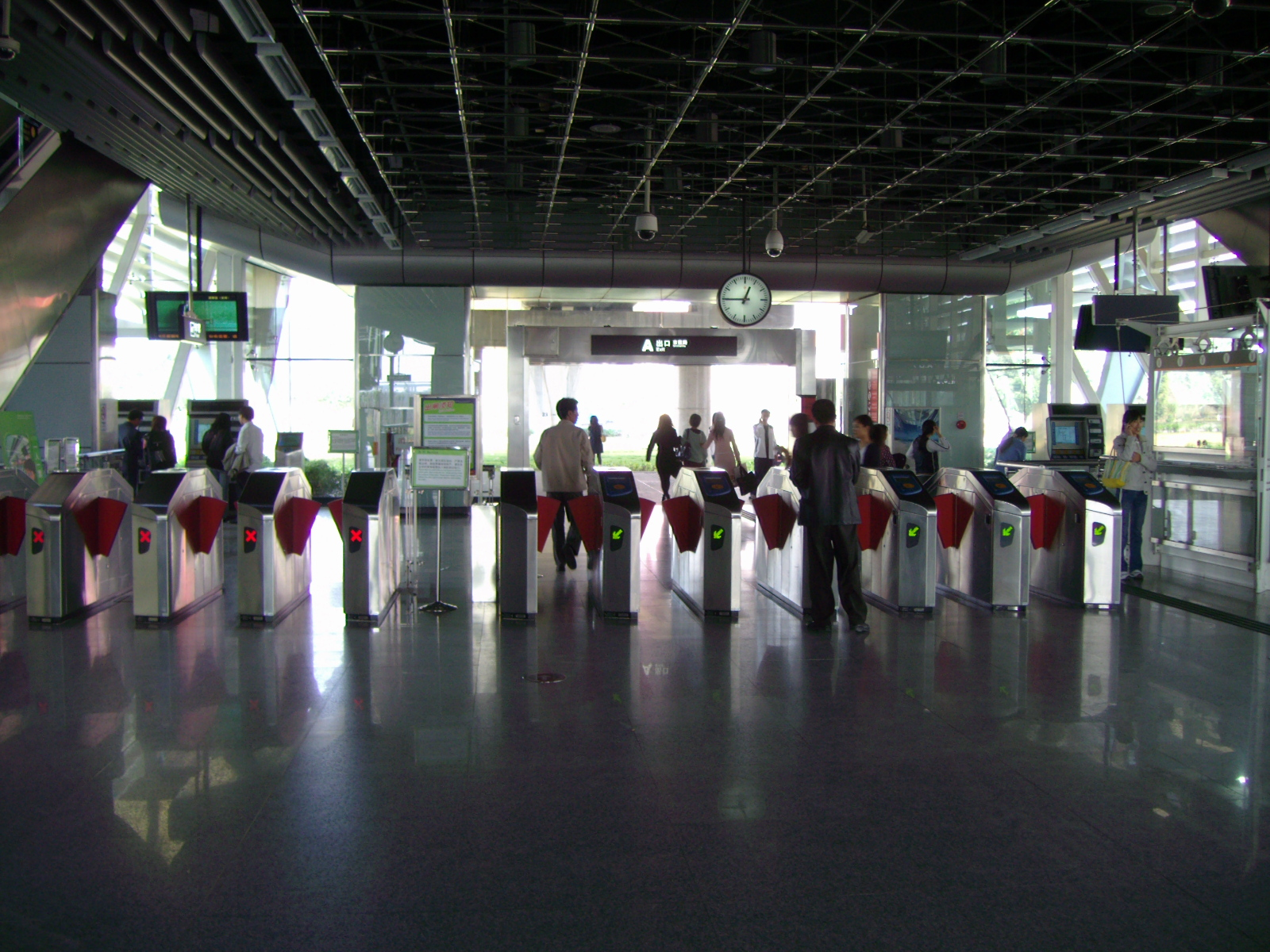
Gate area of the station

| F2; Platforms | Side platform, doors will open on the right |
| F2; Platforms | Platform 2 | 4 towards Nansha Passenger Port (Haibang) |
| F2; Platforms | Platform 1 | 4 towards Huangcun (Xinzao) |
| F2; Platforms | Side platform, doors will open on the right |
| G Concourse | Lobby | Exits, Customer Service, Vending machines, ATMs, Toilet |

== Exits ==
| Exit number | Exit location |
|---|---|
| Exit A | Shilian Lu |
| Exit B | Shilian Lu |
