= Xinzao station =

Guangzhou Metro station

Coordinates: 23°01′42″N 113°24′56″E

Xinzao 新造
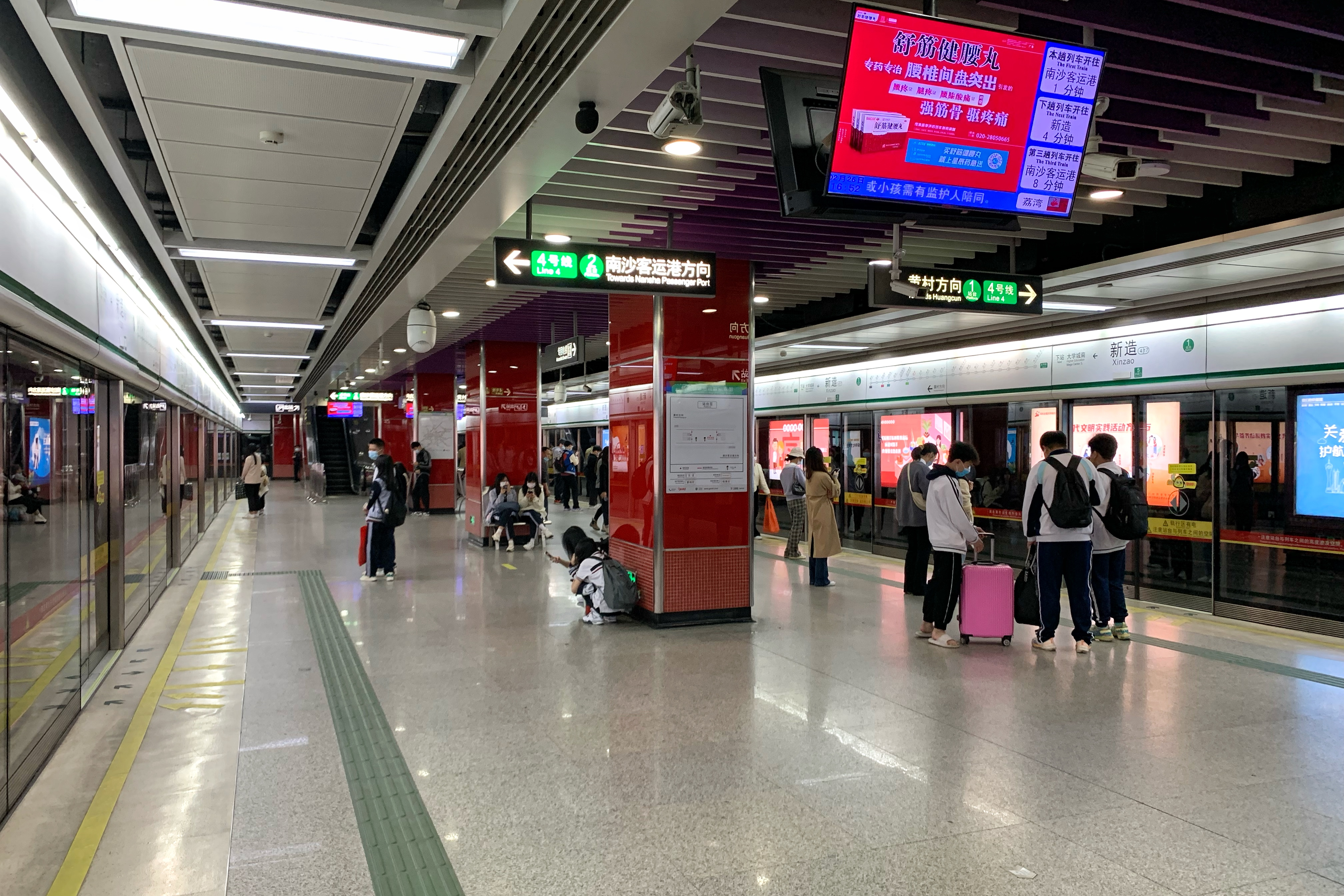
- Platform

Chinese name
- Chinese: 新造站
Transcriptions
Standard Mandarin
- Hanyu Pinyin: Xīnzào Zhàn
Yue: Cantonese
- Yale Romanization: Sānjouh Jaahm
- Jyutping: San^{1}zou^{6} Zaam^{6}
- Hong Kong Romanization: San Cho station

General information
- Location: Panyu District, Guangzhou, Guangdong; China
- Operated by: Guangzhou Metro Co. Ltd.
- Line: Line 4
- Platforms: 2 (1 island platform)

Construction
- Structure type: Underground

Other information
- Station code: 417

History
- Opened: 26 December 2005; 20 years ago

Services
Preceding station	Guangzhou Metro	Following station
Higher Education Mega Center South towards Huangcun	Line 4	Shiqi towards Nansha Passenger Port
Future services (2026)
Higher Education Mega Center South towards Huangcun	Line 4	Guanqiao towards Nansha Passenger Port
Location

Xinzao Station (Chinese: 新造站; Cantonese Yale: Sānjouh Jaahm) is a station of Line 4 of the Guangzhou Metro. It started operations on 26 December 2005. It is located at the underground of Zengbian Village (曾边村), Xinzao Town (新造镇), Panyu District. It was the terminus of Line 4 before the route between Xinzao and Huangge started in service on 30 December 2006.

== Station layout ==
G	-	Exits
L1; Concourse	Lobby	Customer Service, Shops, Vending machines, ATMs
L2; Platforms	Platform 2	4 towards Nansha Passenger Port (Shiqi)
L2; Platforms	Island Platform, doors will open on the left
L2; Platforms	Platform 1	4 towards Huangcun (Higher Education Mega Center South)

== Exits ==
Exit number		Exit location
Exit A	A1	Shixin Lu
Exit A	A2	Shixin Lu
Exit B	B1	Nanyuecun
Exit B	B2	Shilian Lu
