= Guangzhou Higher Education Mega Center =

Area of Guangzhou, China

Coordinates: 23°3′8.3″N 113°23′21.27″E

- Simplified Chinese: 广州大学城
- Traditional Chinese: 廣州大學城
Transcriptions
Standard Mandarin
- Hanyu Pinyin: Guǎngzhōu Dàxuéchéng
Yue: Cantonese
- Jyutping: gwong2 zau1 daai6 hok6 sing4

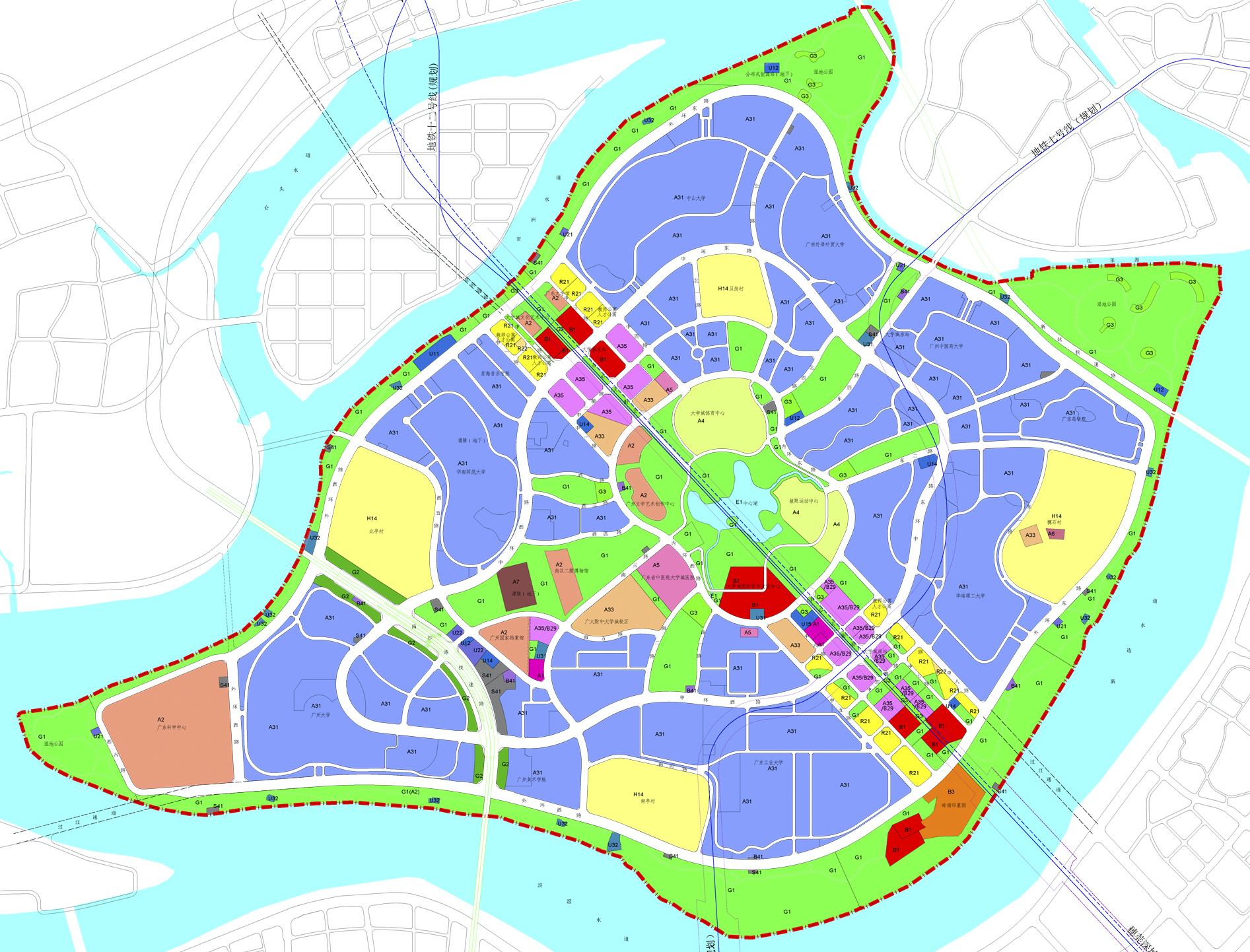
Map of Guangzhou HEMC

Guangzhou Higher Education Mega Center (HEMC), Guangzhou University Town or Guangzhou University City (Chinese: 广州大学城) is an area featured by higher education institutions, located on Xiaoguwei Island (Chinese: 小谷围岛) in Panyu District, Guangzhou, Guangdong Province, China. It was opened in 2004. With an area of approximately 17.9 km^{2} and 3.53 millions square meters of indoor space, the complex is capable of accommodating 350 to 400 thousand people. At the time of construction, it was known as the New University Campus of Guangzhou Region. It is a university park located in Guangzhou, Guangdong Province, China. It is located on Xiaoguwei Island, Panyu District, with an area of 17.9 square kilometers. Construction started in January 2003, and it was officially put into use at the end of August 2004 and welcomed the first ten universities. Since 2014, three universities have successively settled in the 25.3 square kilometer "South Bank of Guangzhou International Innovation City" (that is, the "University City Phase II" in the initial planning period) located in the south bank area of Xiaoguwei Island.

== Components ==
In phase I of the project, ten local higher education institutions set up new campuses on the Xiaoguwei Island with a total capacity of 120,000 students. All except Guangzhou University maintain their old campuses within the city.

Besides ten universities, Guangdong Science Center (Chinese: 广东科学中心), a major science center in China, is located in the Higher Education Mega Center on the west end of Xiaoguwei Island.

In the phase II, two more universities set up campuses in Xinzao town which is located across the river on a separate site. The twelve institutions are:

Phase	University	Chinese	Est.	Type	Location
Phase I	Sun Yat-sen University	中山大学	1924	National	Xiaoguwei Island
Phase I	South China University of Technology	华南理工大学	1952	National	Xiaoguwei Island
Phase I	South China Normal University	华南师范大学	1933	Provincial	Xiaoguwei Island
Phase I	Guangdong University of Foreign Studies	广东外语外贸大学	1995	National	Xiaoguwei Island
Phase I	Guangdong University of Technology	广东工业大学	1995	Provincial	Xiaoguwei Island
Phase I	Guangzhou University	广州大学	2000	Provincial	Xiaoguwei Island
Phase I	Guangzhou University of Chinese Medicine	广州中医葯大学	1956	National	Xiaoguwei Island
Phase I	Guangdong Pharmaceutical University	广东药学院	1958	Provincial	Xiaoguwei Island
Phase I	Xinghai Conservatory of Music	星海音乐学院	1932	Provincial	Xiaoguwei Island
Phase I	Guangzhou Academy of Fine Arts	广州美术学院	1953	Provincial	Xiaoguwei Island
Phase II	Jinan University	暨南大学	1906	National	Xinzao town
Phase II	Guangzhou Medical University	广州医科大学	1958	Provincial	Xinzao town
Phase II	South China University of Technology International Campus	华南理工大学广州国际校区	1952	National	Xinzao town
