= Interwine =

Interwine China, also known as China (Guangzhou) International Wine & Spirits Exhibition, is a trade show in China organized by Canton Universal Fair Group Ltd. It was founded in 2005, when the customs duty on imports of wine decreased from 40% to 14%. It is a showcase for wine and spirits production, trade, and related products and services from abroad, responding to the need of professionals in the field for a trade-fair with strong international appeal and a strict business-to-business formula. In the context of China's rapidly growing appetite for wine consumption, it is the largest international wine exhibition in China and the only wine and spirits fair approved to exhibit at the Canton Fair Complex in Pazhou. It is dedicated entirely to the wine and spirits industry, and brings together the country's whole community of wine and spirits importers, distributors, wholesalers and retailers, along with large-scale buyers such as hotels, airlines, and restaurants.

Interwine is described as the biggest Chinese wine importers networking in China Mainland. Over 60% of the imported wine is located in Guangdong area, making it ranked as the most dynamic place for a wine business with a huge quantity of importers and distributors.

Interwine also organizes professional wine tastings and forums during and before the exhibition. The use to invite different wine experts to join the wine tasting summits. Interwine also organizes business-matching, promotional events and Roadshows in 40 different Chinese cities (46 cities starting from 2018). Since 2008, Interwine organizes and brings Chinese importers to visit wineries overseas. France, Spain, Italy, South Africa, Chile, Argentina, Israel, Romania, Moldova,...are these countries are continuously visited by importers thanks to Interwine.

Interwine China 2013 Spring Session promoted over 50,000 different wines.

Interwine China 2017 Autumn Session took place on 12-14 November at China Import and Export Fair Pazhou Complex in Guangzhou, China.
