= Modiesha station =

Guangzhou Metro interchange station

Modiesha 磨碟沙
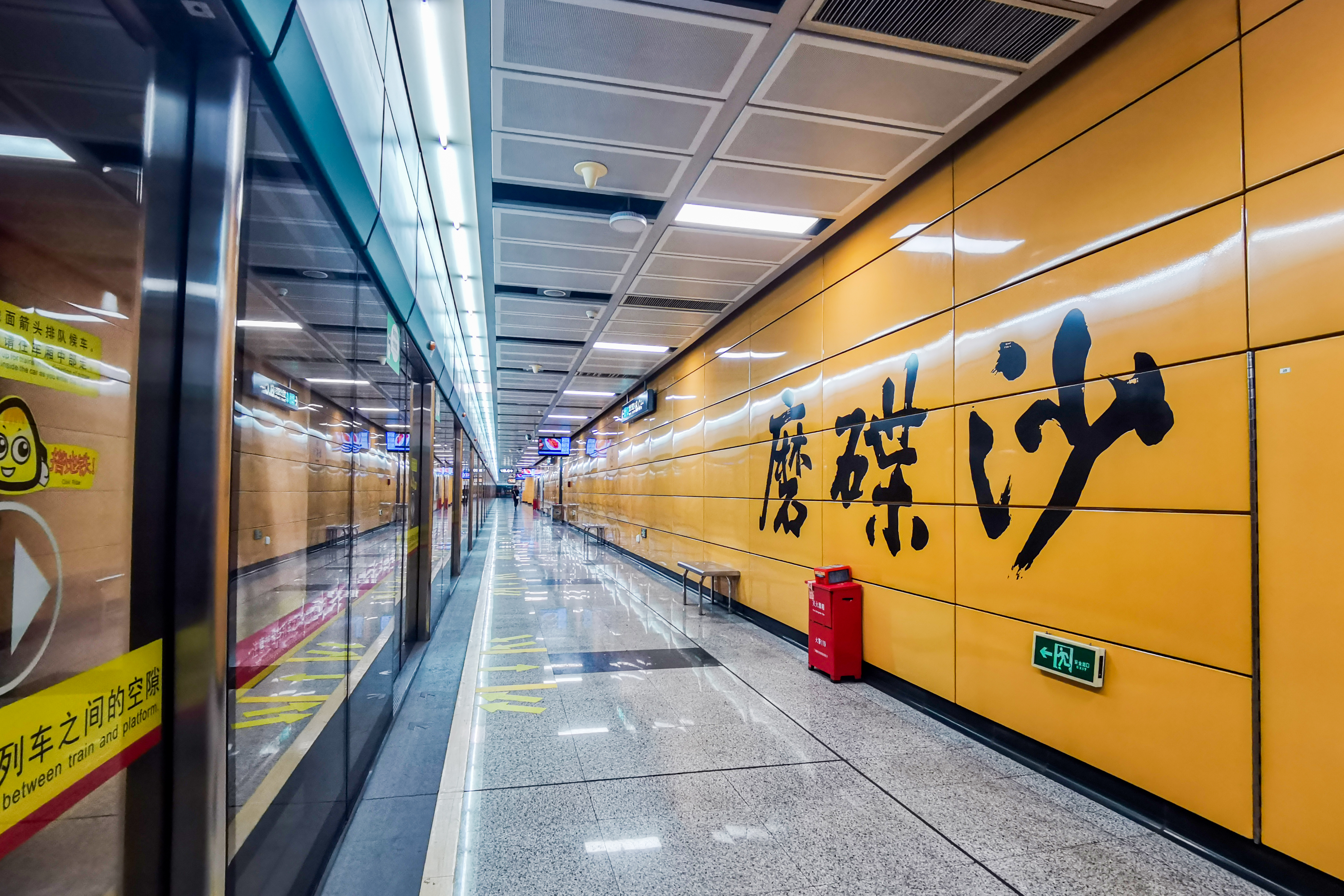
- Platform 2 (Line 8 eastbound platform)

General information
- Location: Xingang East Road; Pazhou Island, Haizhu District, Guangzhou, Guangdong; China
- Coordinates: 23.0986°N 113.3425°E
- Operated by: Guangzhou Metro Co. Ltd.
- Lines: Line 8 Line 18
- Platforms: 4 (2 side platforms and 1 island platform)
- Tracks: 6

Construction
- Structure type: Underground
- Accessible: Yes

Other information
- Station code: 825 1807

History
- Opened: 28 June 2003; 22 years ago (Line 8); 28 September 2021; 4 years ago (Line 18)

Services
Preceding station	Guangzhou Metro	Following station
Chigang towards Jiaoxin	Line 8	Xingangdong towards Wanshengwei
Xiancun Terminus	Line 18	Longtan towards Wanqingsha
Xiancun Terminus	Line 18 Express	Nancun Wanbo towards Wanqingsha
Location

Modiesha station (Chinese: 磨碟沙站; pinyin: Módiéshā Zhàn; Jyutping: mo^{4}dip^{6}saa^{1} zaam^{6}) is an interchange station between Line 8 and Line 18 of the Guangzhou Metro. Line 8 started operation on 28 June 2003 and Line 18 started operation on 28 September 2021. It is located under Xingang East Road (新港东路) in the Haizhu District of Guangzhou.

Before the extension to both lines 2 and 8 opened in September 2010, this station ran as part of Line 2 as a single line from Wanshengwei to Sanyuanli.

== Station layout ==
L1; Concourse & Platforms	Line 18 Lobby	Customer Service, Vending machines, ATMs
L1; Concourse & Platforms	Transfer Passageway	Transfer passageway between Lines 8 & 18
L1; Concourse & Platforms	Line 8 North Lobby	Ticket Machines, Customer Service, Shops, Police Station, Safety Facilities
L1; Concourse & Platforms	Side platform, doors will open on the right
L1; Concourse & Platforms	Platform 1	8 towards Jiaoxin (Chigang)
L1; Concourse & Platforms	Platform 2	8 towards Wanshengwei (Pazhou)
L1; Concourse & Platforms	Side platform, doors will open on the right
L1; Concourse & Platforms	Line 8 South Lobby	Customer Service, Shops, Vending machines, ATMs
L2; Passageways	-	Passageways between North & South Lobbies, Platforms 1 & 2
L2; Passageways	Buffer Area	Buffer area of Line 18
L3; Platforms	Bypass Track	18 express service passing loop (not in passenger use)
L3; Platforms	Platform 3	18 towards Xiancun (Terminus)
L3; Platforms	Island platform, doors will open on the left
L3; Platforms	Platform 4	18 towards Wanqingsha (Longtan / express: Nancun Wanbo)
L3; Platforms	Bypass Track	18 express service passing loop (not in passenger use)

== Gallery ==
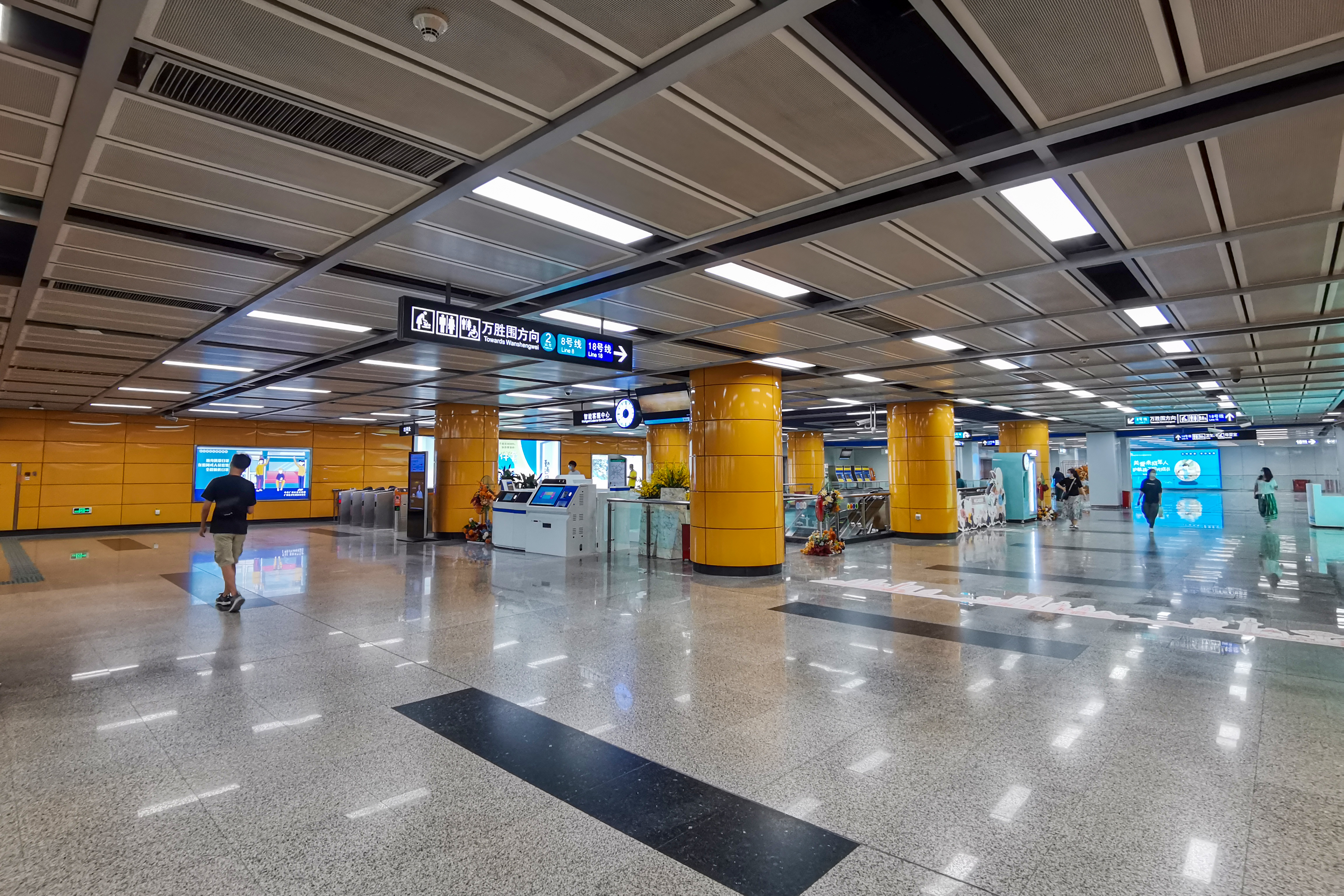
Line 8 north concourse

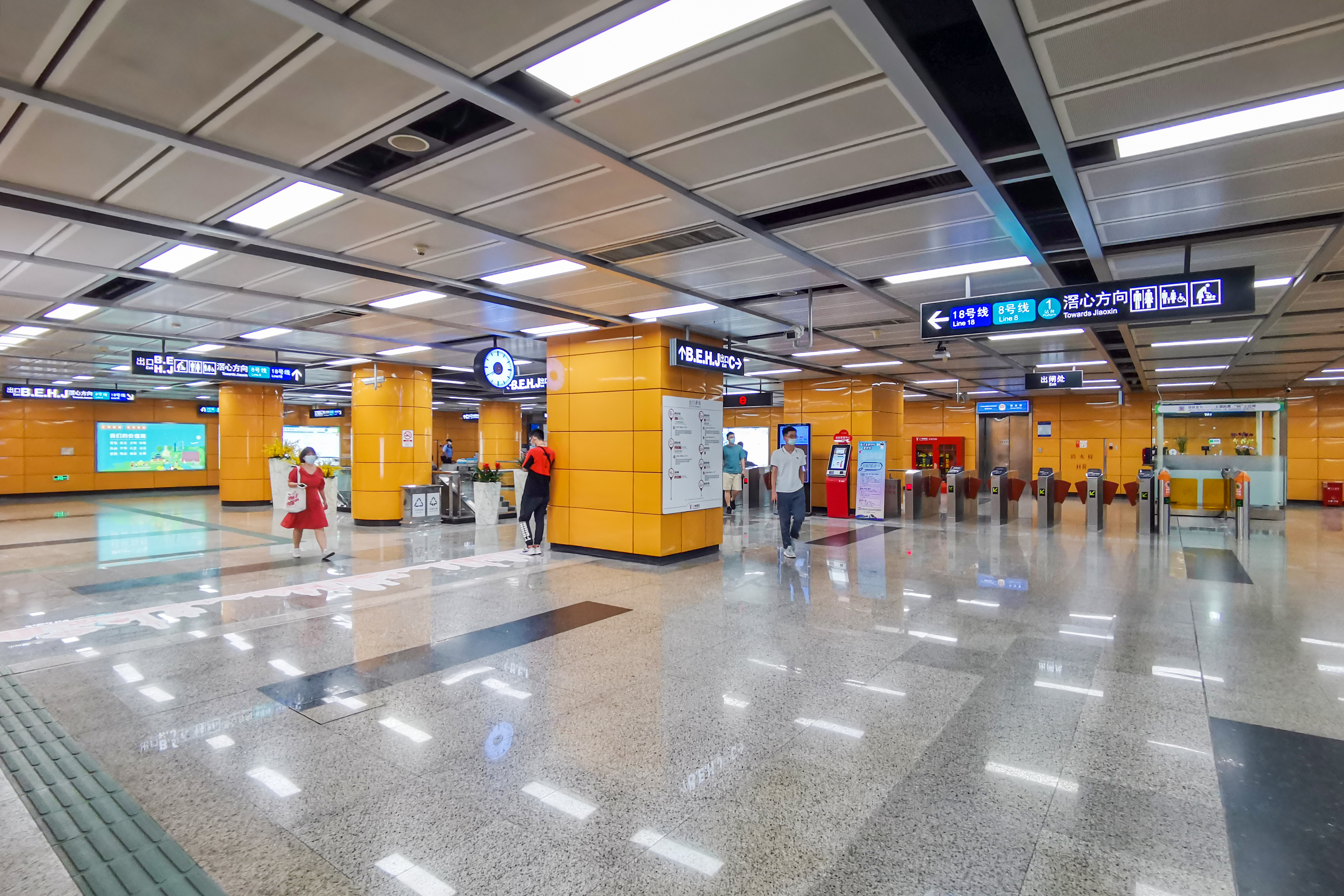
Line 8 south concourse

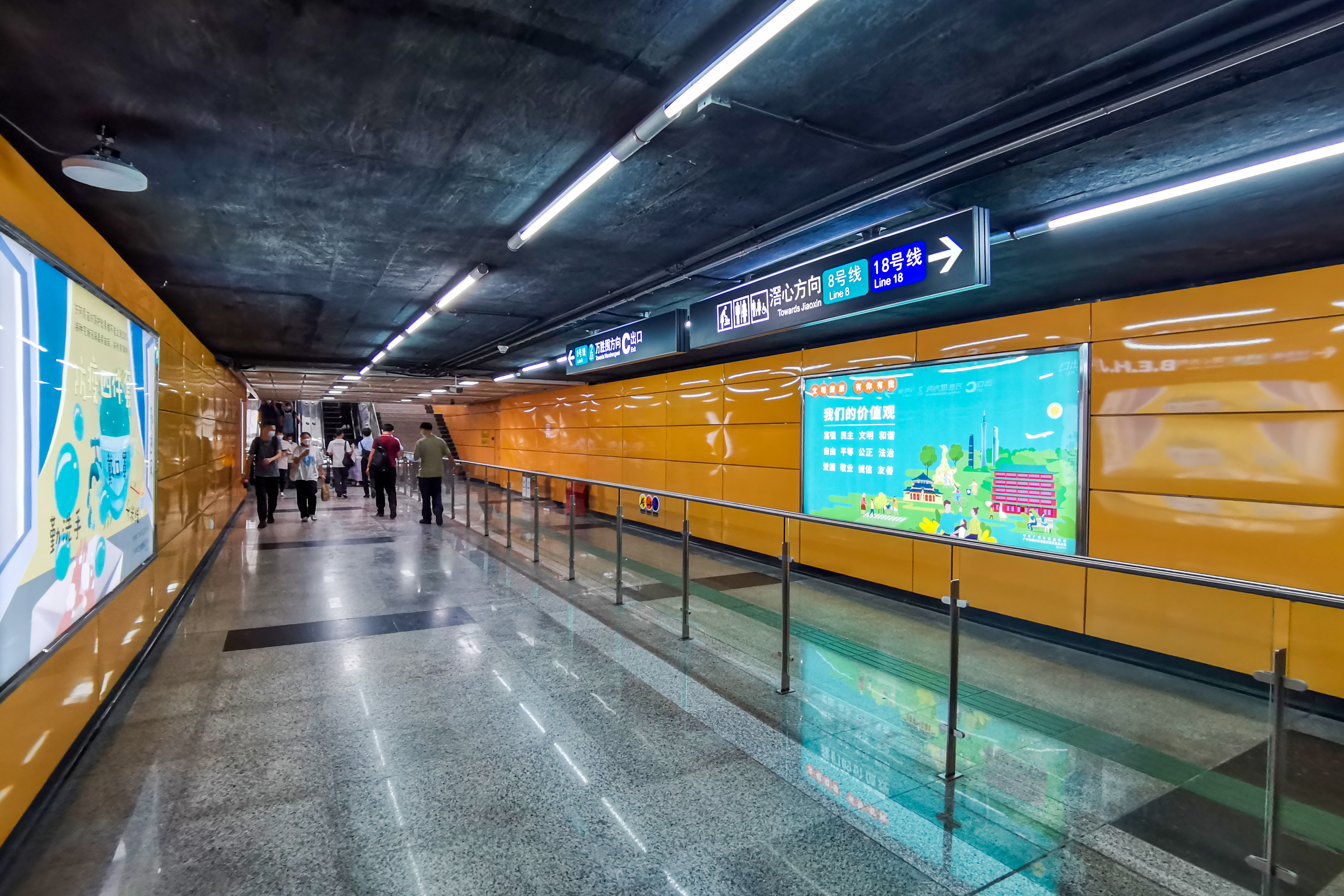
Line 8 concourse connecting passageway

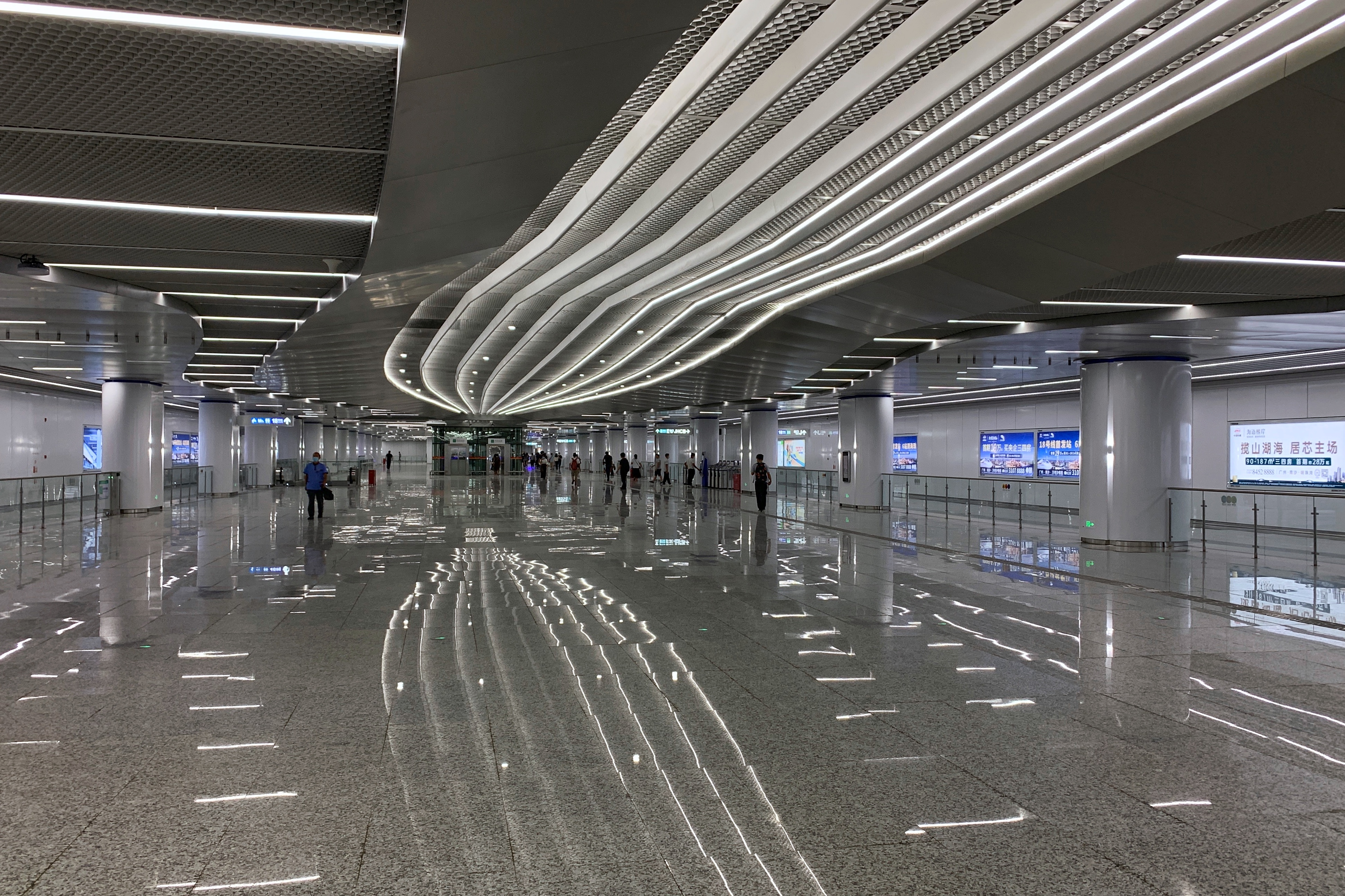
Line 18 concourse

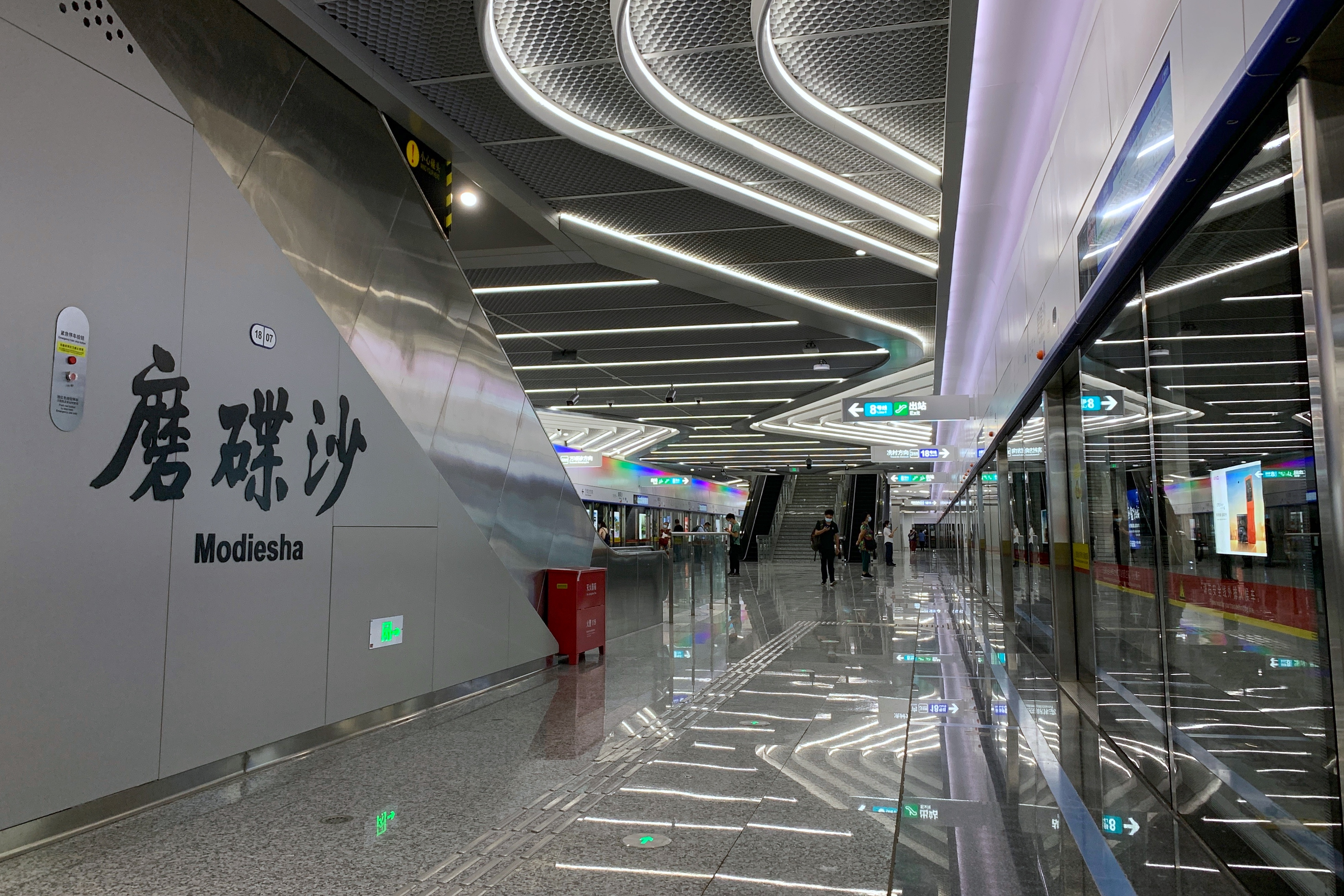
Line 18 platform

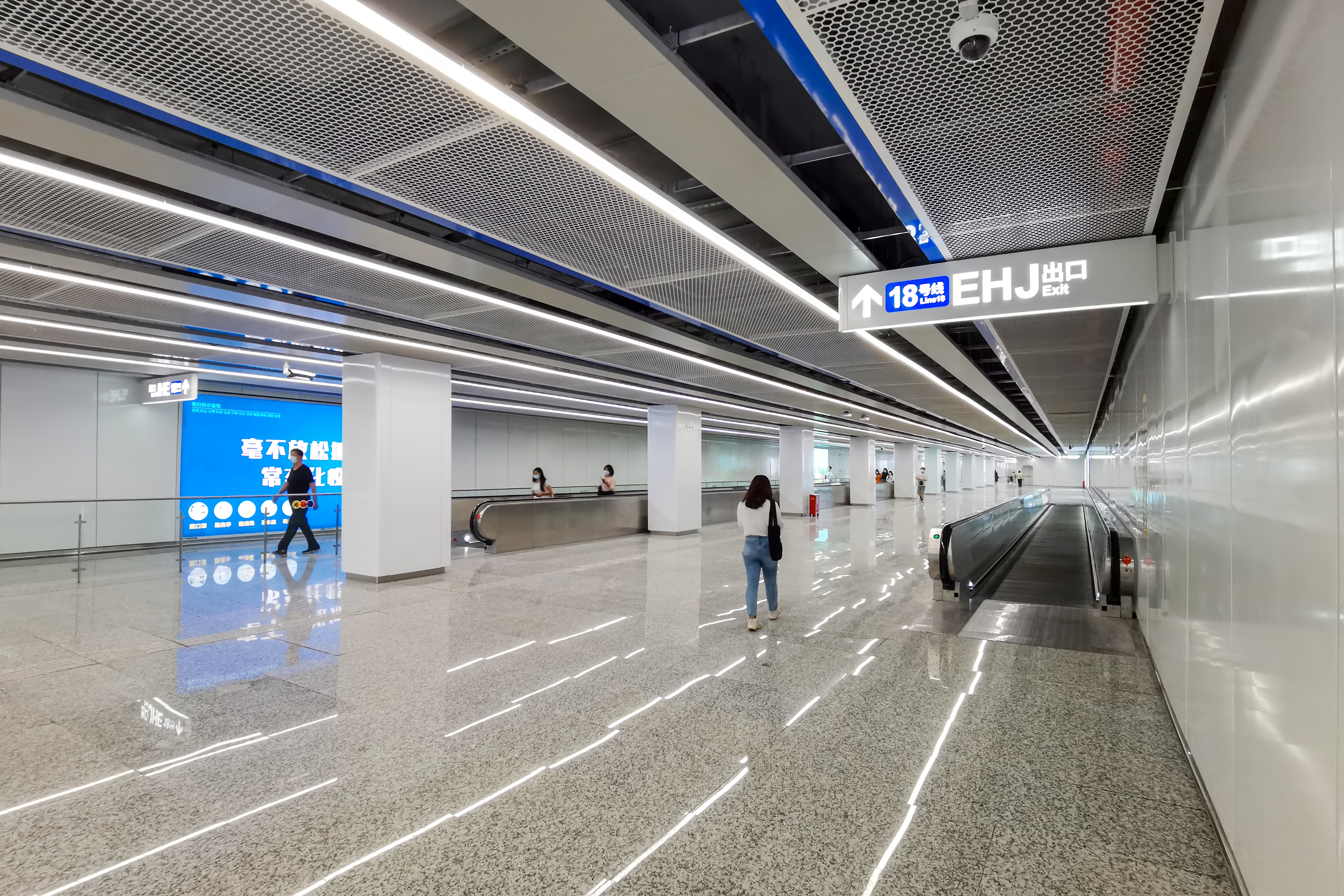
Transfer corridor
