= Canton Fair Complex =

Exhibition center in Guangzhou, China

Coordinates: 23.1041°N 113.3553°E

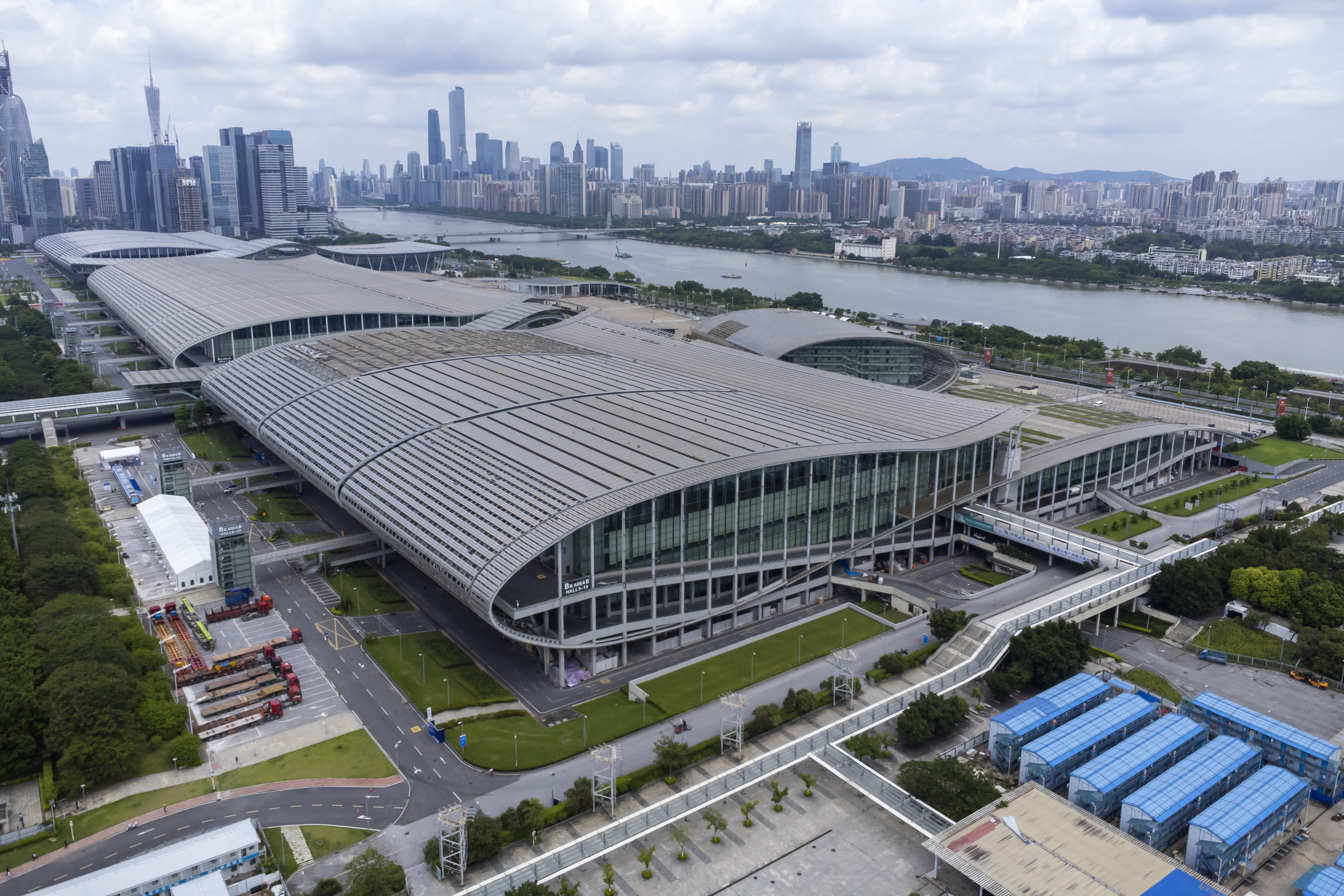
Canton Fair Complex

The Canton Fair Complex (Chinese: 广交会展馆; Jyutping: gwong^{2}gaau^{1}wui^{2} zin^{2}gun^{2}), formerly known as Guangzhou International Convention and Exhibition Center (Chinese: 广州国际会议展览中心; Jyutping: gwong^{2}zau^{1} gwok^{3}zai^{3} wui^{6}ji^{5} zin^{2}laam^{5} zung^{1}sam^{1}), is located on Pazhou Island in the Guangzhou (Canton City) in the People's Republic of China. It is possibly the largest convention center in the world at 12,174,000 sq ft (1,131,000 m^{2}), and also contains the world's largest exhibition hall at 1,700,000.5 sq ft (157,935.21 m^{2}).

Events like Auto Guangzhou and Interwine are held here.

== Transport ==
Canton Fair Complex is served by three Haizhu Tram stations, Canton Fair Complex West, Middle, and East, as well as the nearby Guangzhou Metro stations Xingangdong on Line 8 and Pazhou on Line 8 and Line 11.

== See also ==
- Canton Fair
- List of tourist attractions in China
