= Xingangdong station =

Guangzhou Metro station

Coordinates: 23.0987°N 113.3582°E

Xingangdong 新港东
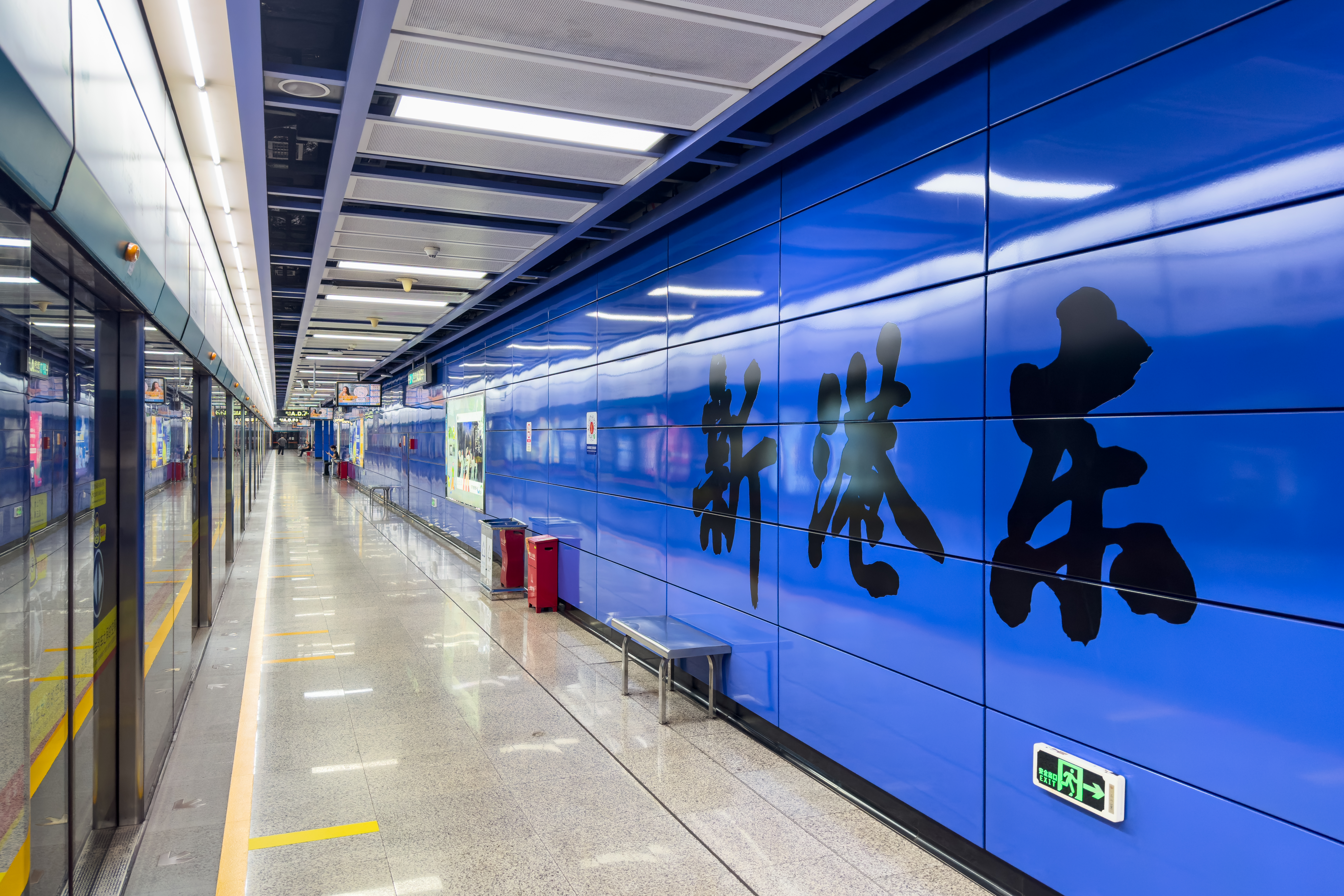

Chinese name
- Simplified Chinese: 新港东站
- Traditional Chinese: 新港東站
Transcriptions
Standard Mandarin
- Hanyu Pinyin: Xīngǎngdōng Zhàn
Yue: Cantonese
- Jyutping: san^{1}gong^{2}dung^{1} zaam^{6}

General information
- Location: Xingang East Road; Pazhou Island, Haizhu District, Guangzhou, Guangdong; China
- Operated by: Guangzhou Metro Co. Ltd.
- Line: Line 8
- Platforms: 2 (2 side platforms)
- Tracks: 2

Construction
- Structure type: Underground
- Accessible: Yes

Other information
- Station code: 826

History
- Opened: 28 June 2003; 22 years ago

Services
Preceding station	Guangzhou Metro	Following station
Modiesha towards Jiaoxin	Line 8	Pazhou towards Wanshengwei
Location

Xingangdong (Chinese: 新港东站; pinyin: Xīngǎng dōng zhàn) is a station on Line 8 of the Guangzhou Metro that became operational on 28 June 2003. It is located at the underground of Xingang Road East in the Haizhu District of Guangzhou. The station is close to the Guangzhou International Convention Exhibition Center, the main venue for the Canton Fair.

Before the extension to both lines 2 and 8 opened in September 2010, this station ran as part of Line 2 as a single line from Wanshengwei to Sanyuanli.

== Station layout ==
G	-	Exits
L1; Concourse & Platforms	North Lobby	Customer Service, Shops, Vending machines, ATMs
L1; Concourse & Platforms	Side platform, doors will open on the right
L1; Concourse & Platforms	Platform 1	8 towards Jiaoxin (Modiesha)
L1; Concourse & Platforms	Platform 2	8 towards Wanshengwei (Pazhou)
L1; Concourse & Platforms	Side platform, doors will open on the right
L1; Concourse & Platforms	South Lobby	Customer Service, Shops, Vending machines, ATMs
L2; Passageways	-	Passageways between North & South Lobbies, Platforms 1 & 2

== Exits ==
Exit number	Exit location
Exit A	Xingang Donglu
Exit D	Xingang Donglu
Exit F	Xingang Donglu
