= Pazhou =

Subdistrict of Haizhu in Guangzhou

Coordinates: 23°05′57″N 113°22′36.2″E

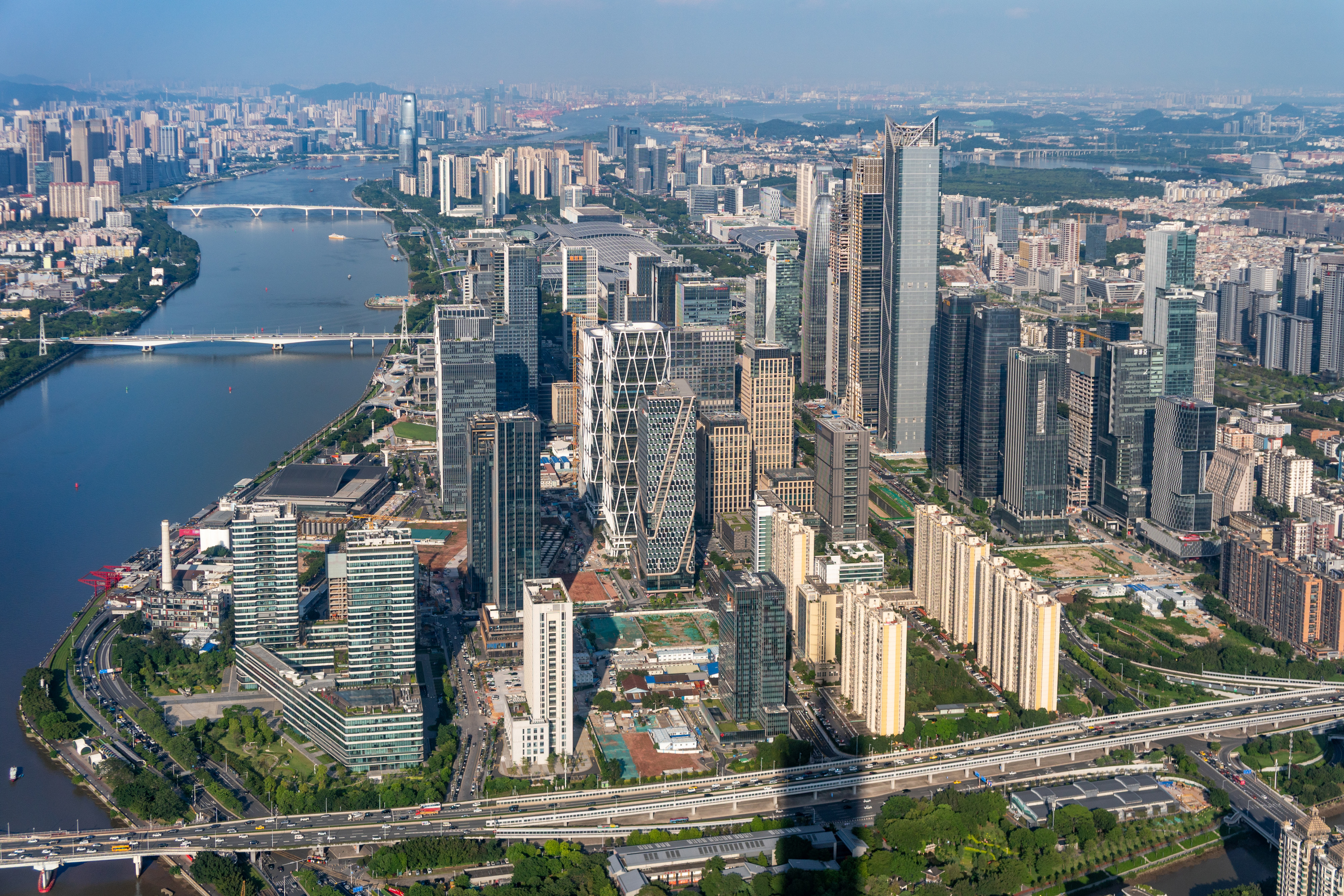
- View of Pazhou
- Chinese: 琶洲
Transcriptions
Standard Mandarin
- Hanyu Pinyin: Pázhōu
- Wade–Giles: Pʻa^{2}chou^{1}
Yue: Cantonese
- Jyutping: Paa^{4} Zau^{1}
- IPA: [pʰa˩.tsɐw˥]

Pazhou Subdistrict
- Chinese: 琶洲街道
Transcriptions
Standard Mandarin
- Hanyu Pinyin: Pázhōu Jiēdào
- Wade–Giles: Pʻa1chou1 Chieh1tao4
Yue: Cantonese
- Jyutping: Paa^{4}zau^{1} Gaai^{1}dou^{6}

Pazhou Island
- Traditional Chinese: 琶洲㠀
- Simplified Chinese: 琶洲岛
Transcriptions
Standard Mandarin
- Hanyu Pinyin: Pázhōudǎo
- Wade–Giles: Pʻa2chou1tao3
Yue: Cantonese
- Jyutping: Paa^{4}zau^{1}dou^{2}

Pazhou is a subdistrict of Haizhu in southeastern Guangzhou, Guangdong Province, in China.

Whampoa Island
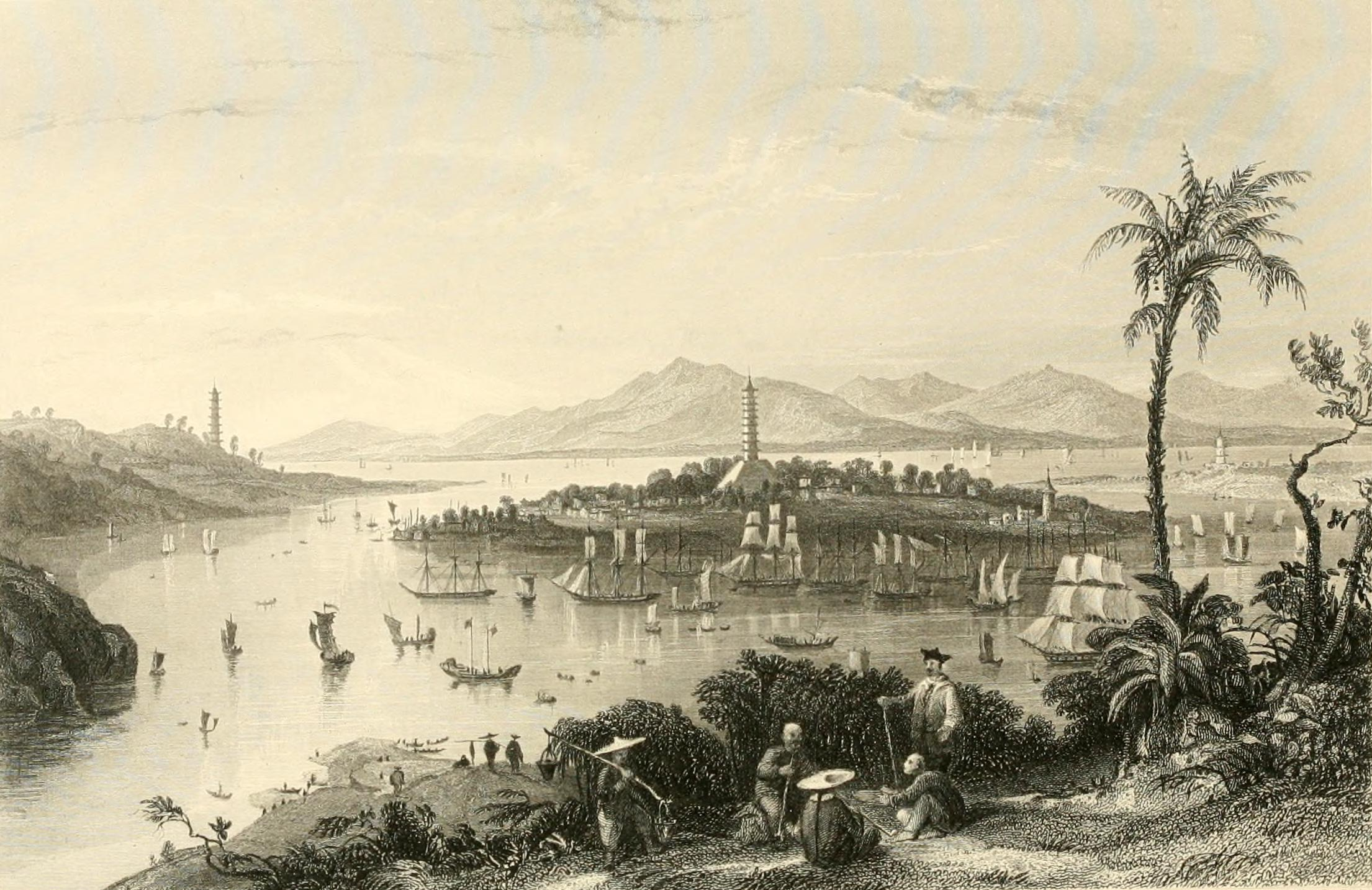
- Whampoa, from Dane's Island (a. 1858)
- Traditional Chinese: 黃埔島
- Simplified Chinese: 黄埔岛
- Postal: Whampoa Island
Transcriptions
Standard Mandarin
- Hanyu Pinyin: Huángpǔdǎo
- Wade–Giles: Huang2pʻu3 Tao3
Yue: Cantonese
- Jyutping: Wong^{4}bou^{3} Dou^{2}

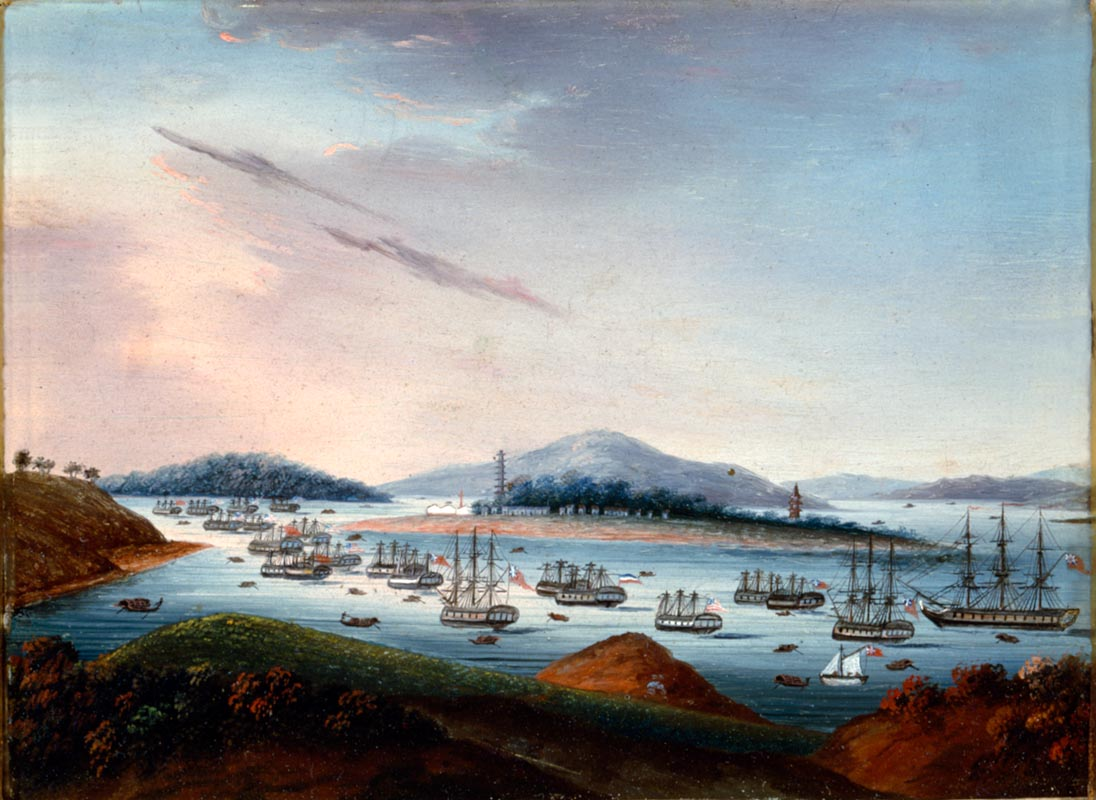
Whampoa Anchorage (c. 1810)

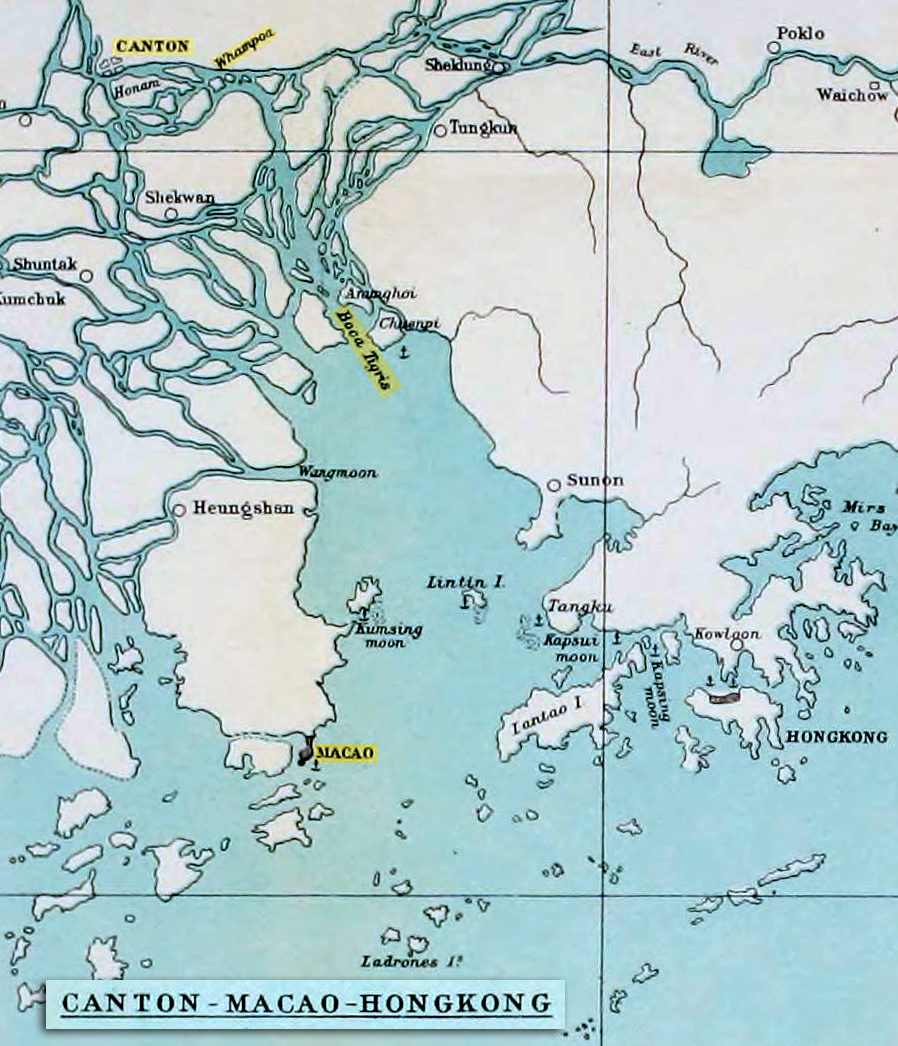
The Pearl River Delta.

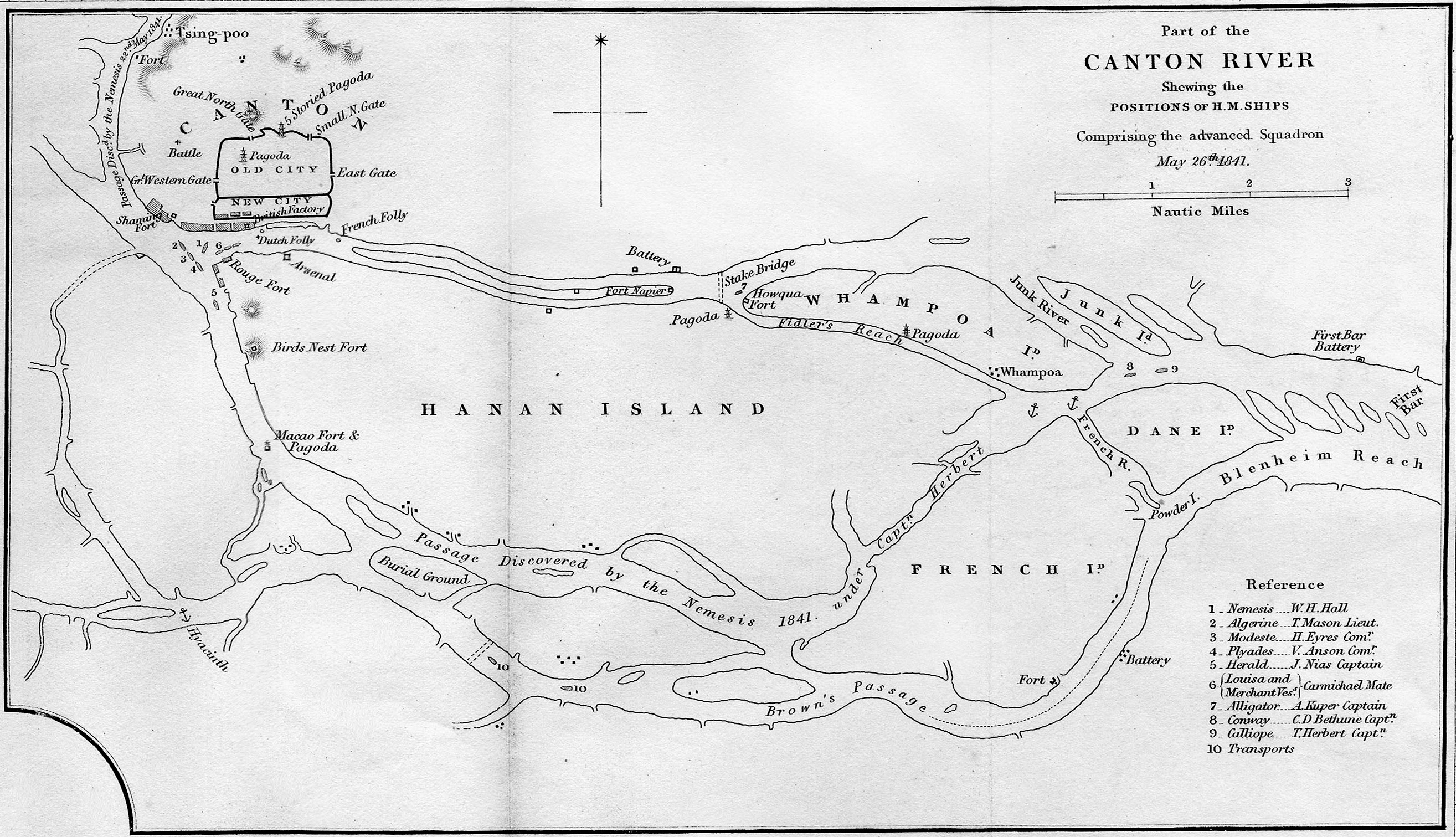
A map of the islands around Pazhou ("Whampoa") c. 1840. Henan ("Hanan") lies to its west and south, Changzhou ("Dane's Island") to its east, and Xiaoguwei ("French Island") to its southeast. The "Whampoa Anchorage" lay between them.

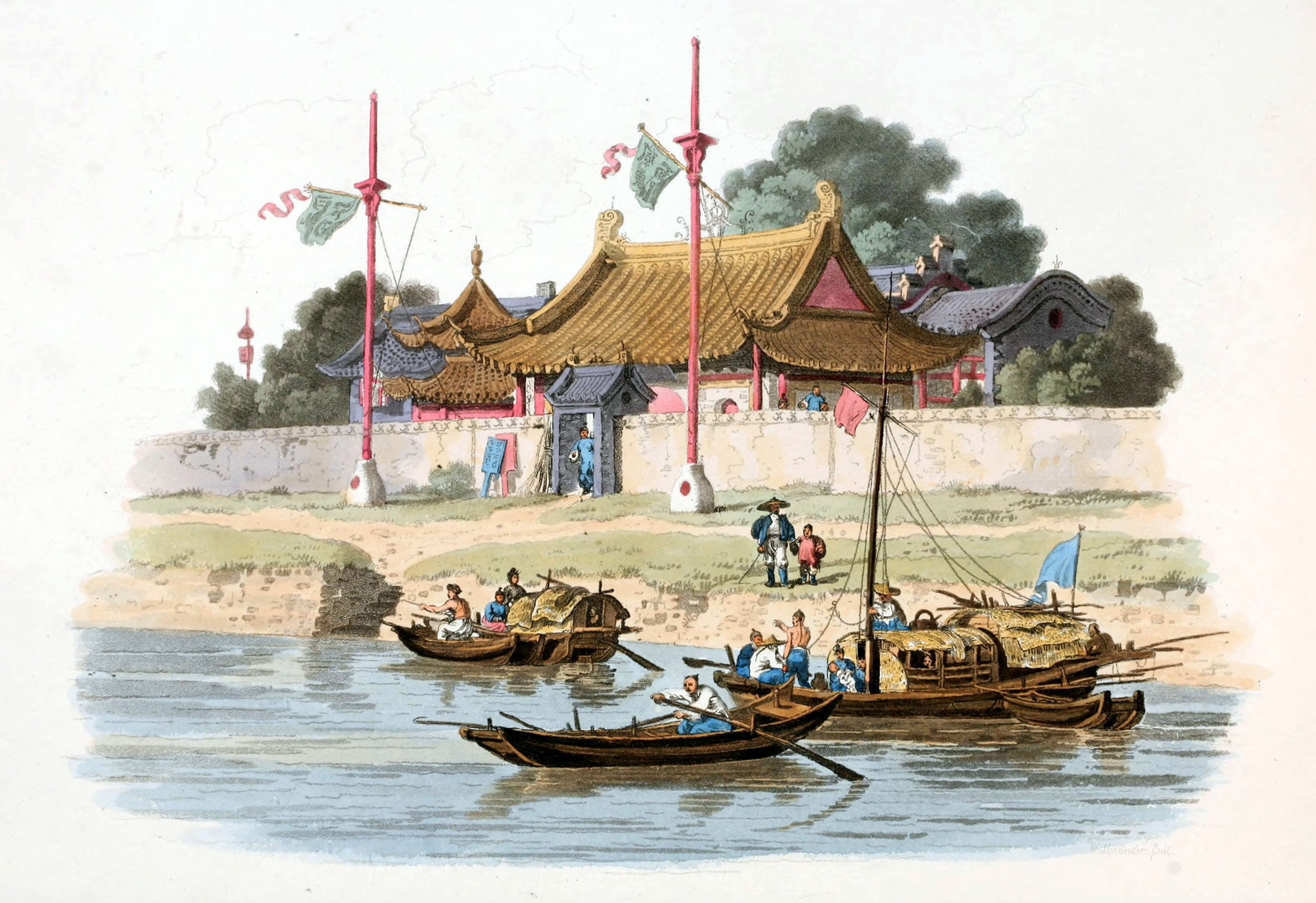
Sampans outside the house of a mandarin, c. 1800

Pazhou Island, formerly Whampoa Island, has a total area of 15 km^{2} (5.8 sq mi) and is the site of Pazhou Pagoda. Its eastern bay was formerly the chief anchorage for ships participating in Guangzhou's foreign trade. Traders from the "Southern Sea", including Indians, Arabians, and most Europeans, were required to keep their ships at Pazhou while smaller craft ferried goods to and from the Thirteen Factories area of Guangzhou's western suburbs. Traders rented storage for ships supplies and repair shops on Whampoa Island. Images of the anchorage were a common theme in 18th-century art.

With the expansion of Guangzhou, the subdistrict is now part of its downtown area, with many commercial and recreational facilities. The Guangzhou International Convention and Exhibition Center is the current site of the annual Canton Fair.

== Names ==
The English, French, and Danish Whampoa and Swedish Wampoa are irregular romanizations of the Chinese 黃埔, "Yellow Bank". The name was used to refer indifferently to the island, its settlement, and its anchorage.

== Geography ==
Modern Pazhou is an island in the Pearl River with an area of about 15 km^{2} (5.8 sq mi). It lies 25 miles (40 km) upriver of the Humen Strait and historically about 12 miles (19 km) east of the walled city of Guangzhou proper, although Guangzhou has since expanded so greatly that Puzhou forms part of its city center. Since the Thirteen Factories—the ghetto assigned to foreign traders in the 17th, 18th, and 19th centuries—was located in Guangzhou's western suburbs, the trip between the anchorage and the wharves at Jack-ass Point was about 16 miles (26 km).

Before modern dredging, the silt carried by the Pearl River made it shallow and unpredictable as far south as Macao, with large sand banks and swift currents impeding navigation from the Humen Strait on. Foreign ships usually depended on local pilots; the relative lack of wind also meant that most sailing ships required towing north from the strait. The main anchorage was off southeastern Pazhou. Southeast of this was Changzhou ("Dane's Island"). South of Pazhou was Xiaoguwei ("French Island") and southwest Henan ("Honam Island").

== History ==
The Baiyue peoples had settlements around Guangzhou since the Neolithic era, although the Chinese date the city to the foundation of Panyu by soldiers under Zhao Tuo during the Qin conquest. From then on, it formed a major port on the South China Sea, connecting its traders with Hunan and northern China via a network of canals. The port was protected by its city wall and by fortifications and naval bases around the Humen Strait (formerly the "Boca Tigris" or "Bogue"). Ships of war were not permitted to pass closer to the city. European trade began with the arrival of Rafael Perestrello on a native junk in 1516 and was originally conducted directly on Guangzhou's waterfront. Portuguese misconduct—and rumors that they were eating the children they were enslaving (Note: "Some early Chinese historians go even so far as to give vivid details of the price paid for the children and how they were roasted.")—quickly cut off access, but this was regained after the 1554 Luso-Chinese Accord. Their trade was based out of Macao, but after the general sea bans were lifted in 1684 Pazhou (as "Whampoa") became an important anchorage as the great draft of the East Indiamen turned it into Guangzhou's deep-water port.

Early traders were obliged to follow the monsoon winds, arriving between June and September, conducting their business, and then departing between November and February. Typically, cargo was ferried from the ships by its own crew and to the ships at the expense of the Chinese merchants on their "chop boats" (lighters). To avoid theft or piracy, foreign traders began assigning a few of their own seamen to these ships as guards. In 1686, Westerners were allowed to rent accommodations in the factory quarter to avoid the necessity of shuttling back to Pazhou each night. For the most part, the supercargos, their assistants, and the bookkeepers stayed at the factories, the crew—except for a few guards or those on shore leave—stayed with the ships, and the captains continued to ferry between the two. A comprador (買班) dealt with the ship's provisions at Pazhou, where sampan ladies crowded around the ships to do laundry and odd jobs for the sailors.

As an added layer of defense and revenue, city officials continued to enforce anchorage at Pazhou even when smaller private craft began to trade in increasing numbers following the mid-18th discovery of the Philippine route allowed them to come and go without waiting months for the monsoon winds. By then, fixed berths for different nations were established at the anchorage. Innermost and westernmost were the Americans and after them came the Dutch and the Swedes. Next came the Danes and the French, close to Changzhou ("Dane's Island") and Xiaoguwei ("French Island"), which they used for their bases. (Note: The French, British, Swedes, and some Dutch were interred in graves on Xiaoguwei; the Danes and other Dutchmen buried their dead on Changzhou. Both islands were also used for Chinese graves.) The British were last and outermost. Getting the ship from the Human Strait to Pazhou usually required traveling only by day and assistance from a local pilot, although English merchants occasionally showed off by making the trip unaided. The swift current and lack of wind meant most ships needed towing; this was usually done using the ship's boats but some needed help from other ships' boats or the Chinese sampans. (Note: The pilot and 30 sampans employed by the Swedish ship Prins Carl in 1765 cost it 26 taels.) Chinese regulations prescribed that the ships entered the anchorage with their gunwales decked out in a "paunk suite", a brightly colored cloth with yellow ribbons; the crew were also done up in special clothes: black velvet caps, tassels, cotton stockings, buckled knee-garters and shoes, and special buttons. The firing of salutes and replies at Pazhou, where twenty ships might be anchored at a time, made the area a noisy one. (Note: At the time, it was customary to fire salutes of eight blank shots as a mark of respect when passing certain landmarks; when meeting other ships in transit; when ships arrived or left the anchorage; and when prominent officers arrived or left a ship. Given a salute, a ship had to respond in kind.)

While at anchor, the ships were overhauled: cleaned, repaired, painted, with the rigging and sails mended. To facilitate loading and unloading cargo, the ships' yards and sprits were removed and stored in sheds on Pazhou or Xiaoguwei. The sheds, made of bamboo poles and woven mats and known as "bankshalls", (Note: The English "bankshall" was mistranslated by Swedes as bängsal ("devil's" or "brawl hall") and by Danes as bankesal ("beating hall").) were usually rented from local officials, though the French and Swedes (Note: Beginning with the 1761 arrival of the Riksens Stränder.) received permission to build their own on Xiaoguwei. They also served as a workshop for careful repairs or living quarters for the ships' supercargos, but most of them preferred to be left at Macao or ferried to the Thirteen Factories at Guangzhou. Foreign crews were usually left on their ships, but captains usually rotated shore leaves and work on land to keep up morale. Common trips were to the Fanee Gardens and Hoi Tong Monastery on Henan and to the shopping streets of the Thirteen Factories, particularly Hog Lane. Despite the generally healthy climate, fevers still occasionally decimated crews and drunkenness and brawls were common. Officers chaperoned shore leaves but sometimes required help from local authorities, as in 1761 when the Pazhou mandarins closed down a Dutch punsch tent set up on Xiaoguwei at the request of Puankhequa, then the fiador of the Swedish East India Company. He was passing along a request from their supercargo, who in turn was acting on a note from a Swedish captain who had become powerless to keep his men away from it. For the men on the ships, however, sampan ladies would crowd around them to get laundry work or odd jobs.

At that time, the land from Pazhou down to the Humen Strait was made up of undulating green hills cut into rice paddies and crowned by groves. Locals also grew sugarcane and vegetables. Since the area was barely above sea level and subject to typhoons, levies were raised around the villages to protect them from the sea. From Pazhou, one could make out five signal towers, the largest being the Lion's Tower on an island halfway between Pazhou and the Humen Strait. These 9-story towers used signal fires to relay messages, and it was said they could be sent from Guangzhou to Beijing—a distance of about 1,200 miles (1,900 km)—in less than 24 hours. During his 1832 visit, Edmund Roberts noted that Pazhou was unsafe for foreigners, with locals beating anyone who entered certain areas. Xiaoguwei was more accommodating.

During the First Opium War, the Battle of Whampoa was fought between British and Chinese forces on 2 March 1841. Even following the Opium Wars and into the 20th century, sailing vessels continued to stop at Pazhou though steamers began to call at Guangzhou directly.

The Canton Fair has been located in Pazhou since its 104th session.

== Transportation ==
Pazhou station, Xingangdong station and Modiesha station of Guangzhou Metro are located on the island.

== See also ==
- Haijin, Canton System, & Thirteen Factories
