= Pazhou station (Guangzhou Metro) =

Guangzhou Metro Lines 8 and 11 station

Pazhou 琶洲
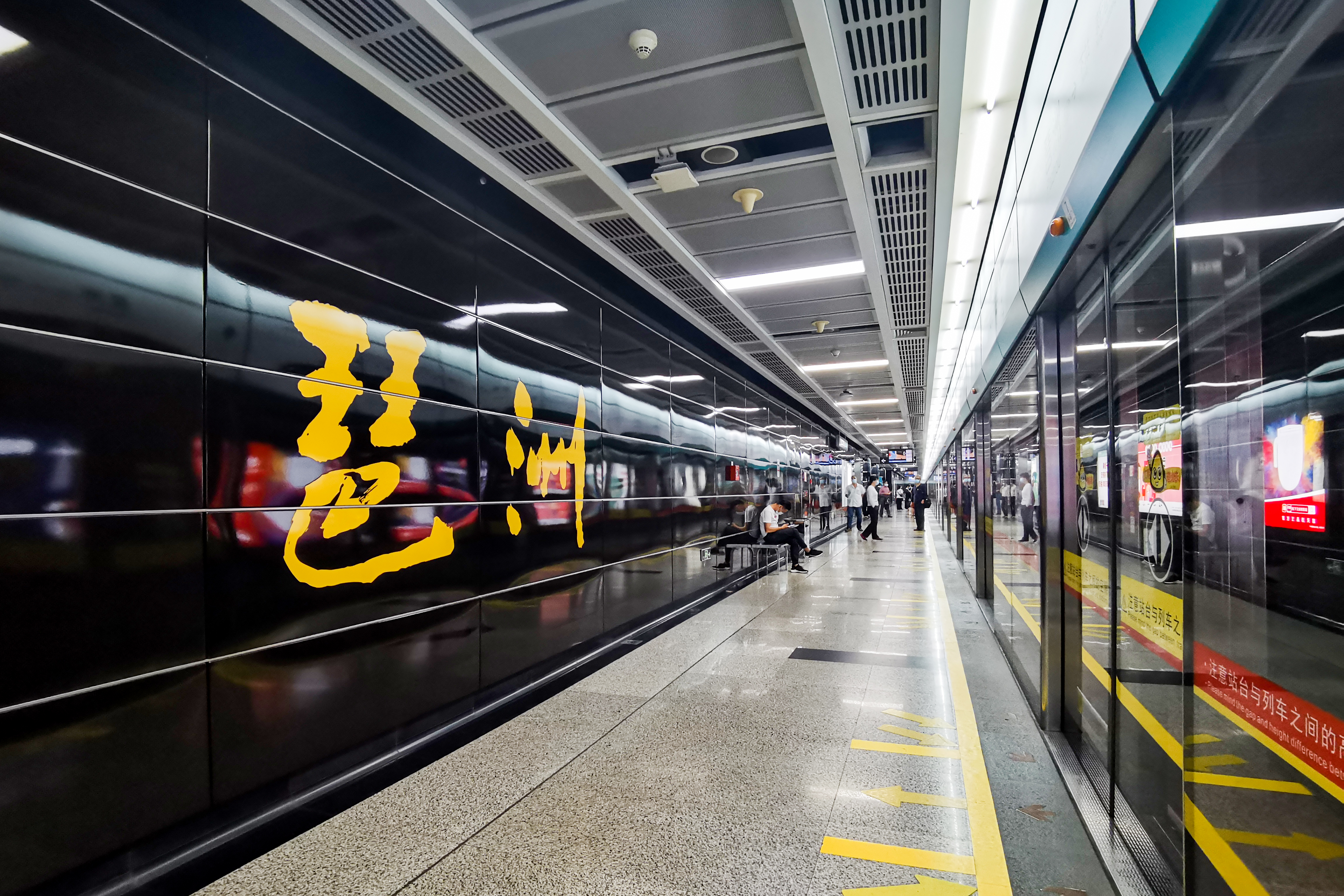
- Line 8 (westbound platform)

Chinese name
- Chinese: 琶洲站
Transcriptions
Standard Mandarin
- Hanyu Pinyin: Pázhōu Zhàn
Yue: Cantonese
- Yale Romanization: Paǎjāu Jaahm
- Jyutping: Paa^{4}zau^{1} Zaam^{6}
- Hong Kong Romanization: Whampoa Island station

General information
- Location: Intersection of Xingang East Road (新港东路) and Canton Fair Complex East Road (會展东路), Pazhou Subdistrict, Haizhu District, Guangzhou, Guangdong; China
- Coordinates: 23°6′3.73″N 113°21′40.20″E
- Operator: Guangzhou Metro Co. Ltd.
- Lines: Line 8; Line 11
- Platforms: 4 (2 side platforms and 1 island platform)
- Tracks: 4
- Connections: Pazhou

Construction
- Structure type: Underground
- Accessible: Yes

Other information
- Station code: 827 1102

History
- Opened: Line 8: 28 June 2003 (23 years ago); Line 11: 28 December 2024 (19 months ago)

Services
Preceding station	Guangzhou Metro	Following station
Xingangdong towards Jiaoxin	Line 8	Wanshengwei Terminus
Yuancun Outer Circle	Line 11	Chisha Inner Circle
Transfer at Pazhou
Preceding station	Pearl River Delta Metropolitan Region Intercity Railway	Following station
Keyunlu towards Huadu	Guangzhou East Ring intercity railway transfer at Pazhou	Guangzhou Higher Education Mega Center towards Panyu
through to Guangzhou East Ring intercity railway	Pazhou–Lianhuashan intercity railway transfer at Pazhou	Shenjing towards Guangzhou Lianhuashan
Location

Pazhou station (Chinese: 琶洲站; Jyutping: paa4 zau1 zaam6; Cantonese Yale: Paǎjāu Jaahm) is an interchange station between Line 8 and Line 11 of the Guangzhou Metro. The Line 8 station started operations on 28 June 2003, and is located under Xingang East Road on Pazhou Island in the Haizhu District, near the Guangzhou International Convention Exhibition Center, the main venue for the Canton Fair.

Before the extension to both lines 2 and 8 opened in September 2010, this station was part of Line 2 as a single Line from Wanshengwei to Sanyuanli.

Line 11 started operating at this station on 28 December 2024.

== Features ==
The station is a key characteristic station of intangible cultural heritage on Line 11, featuring the theme of "Cantonese Dance Shengping". There are shop windows in the concourse which showcase cultural artworks such as Cantonese carving, Canton porcelain, and Guangdong lion dancing.

== Station layout ==
=== Entrances/exits ===
There are currently 4 points of entry/exit for passengers to enter and exit the Line 8 station, 2 lettered exits in the north and south concourses, respectively, and a dedicated exit for Poly World Trade Center between the two exits in the south concourse. The station can reach Areas B and C of the Canton Fair Complex, and this remark was specially added to the new version of the line network map in December 2024.

In order to cooperate with the installation of off-site security checks, Exit A of this station was temporarily closed on 5 October 2020 and reopened at the end of December 2020 after renovation, with an off-site security check room added. The Line 11 station has two exits, Exits E and F, each with two special elevators; one from the concourse to the sunken square and one from the sunken square to surface level.

==== Line 8 north concourse ====
- A: Xingang East Road: Pazhou Pagoda, Canton Fair Complex Area B, Surface corridor to Exit F
- B: Xingang East Road: Canton Fair Complex Area A

==== Line 8 south concourse ====
- C: Xingang East Road: Canton Fair Complex Area C
- D: Xingang East Road

==== Line 11 concourse ====
- E: Xingang East Road: Canton Fair Complex Area B, Pazhou Hong Kong-Macau Passenger Port, THZ1 Canton Fair Complex East station
- F: Xingang East Road: Pazhou Pagoda, Canton Fair Complex Area B, Surface corridor to Exit A

Exits A and C are equipped with stairlifts, and Exit E is equipped with an elevator.

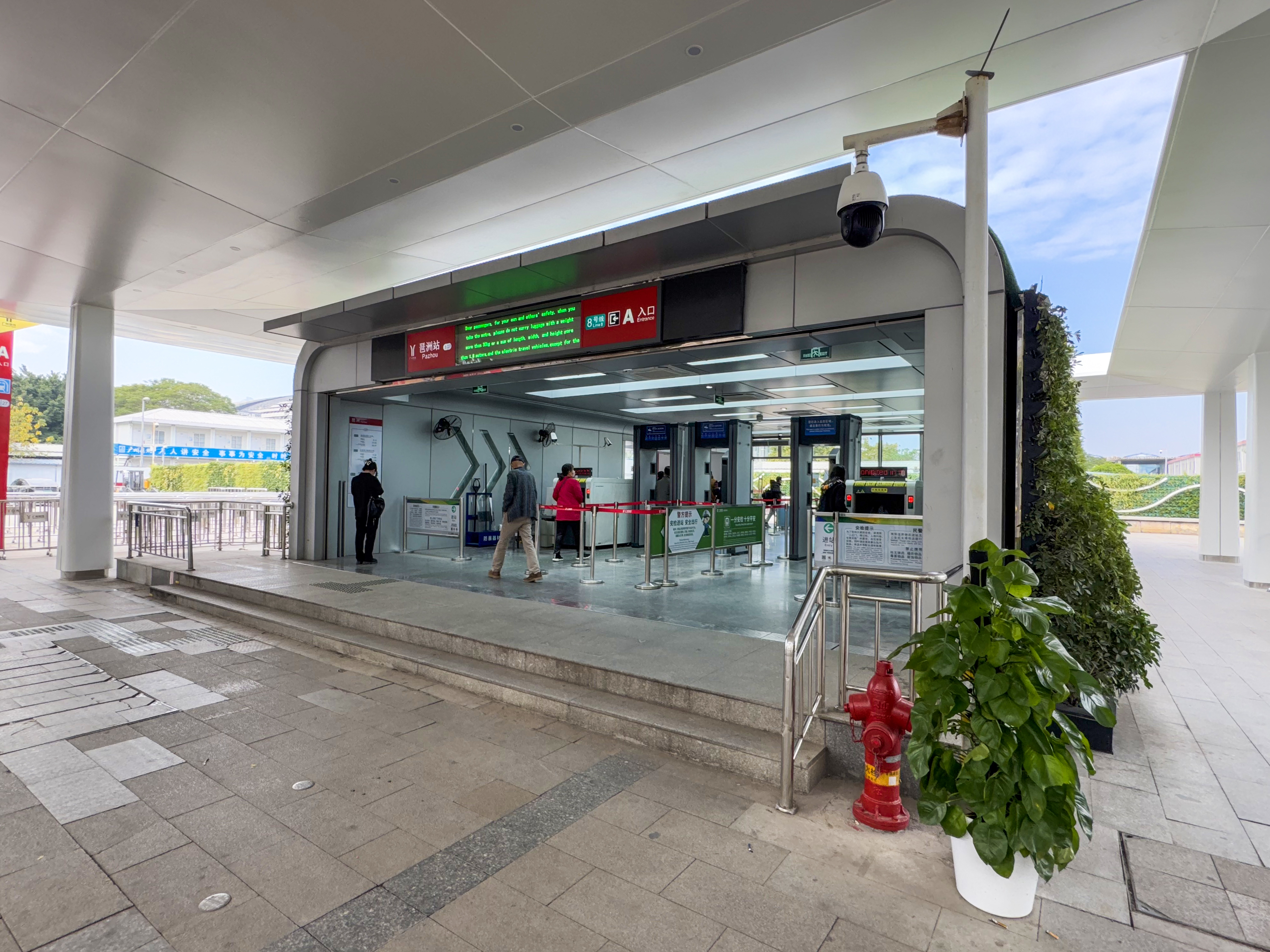
Entrance A

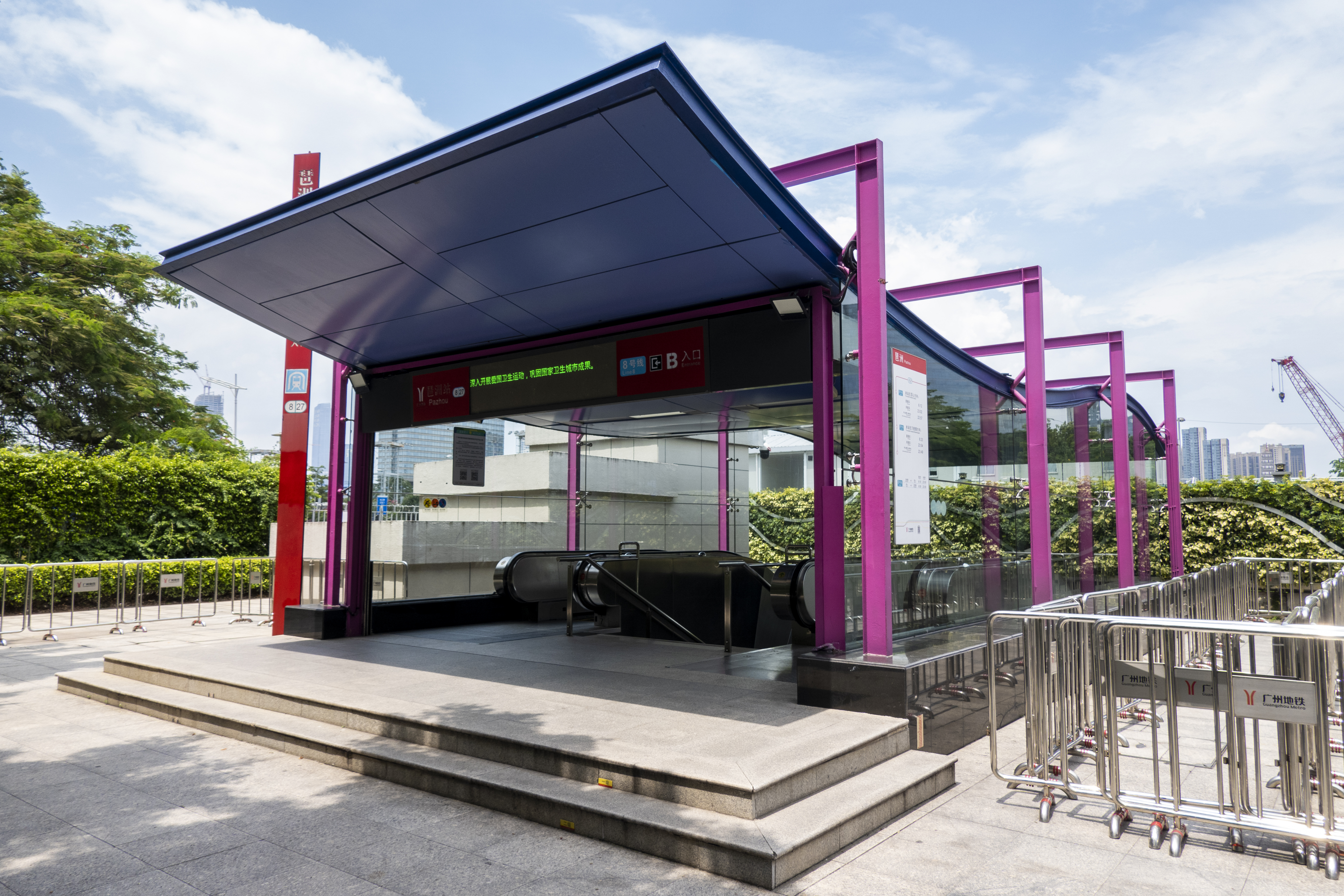
Entrance B

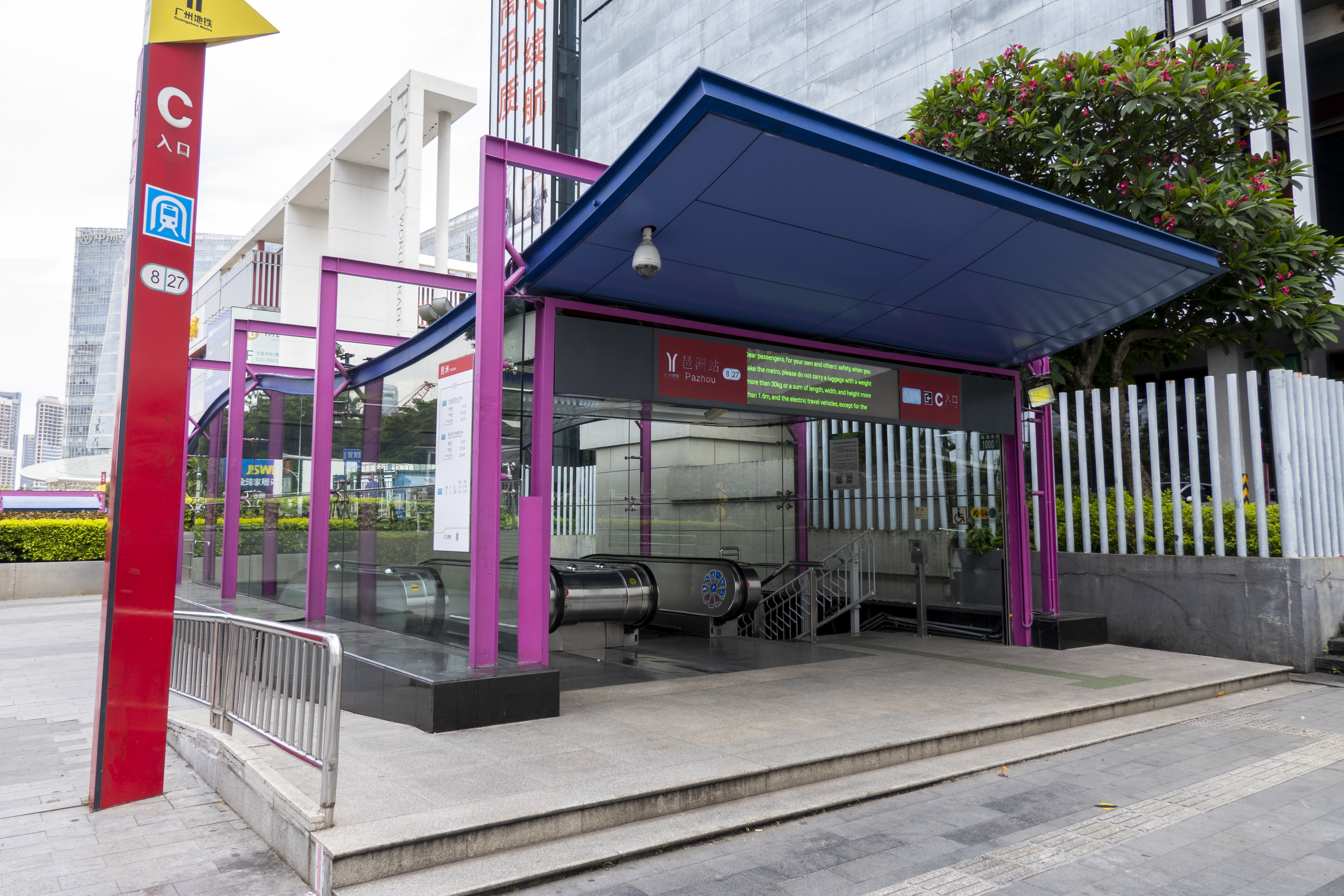
Entrance C

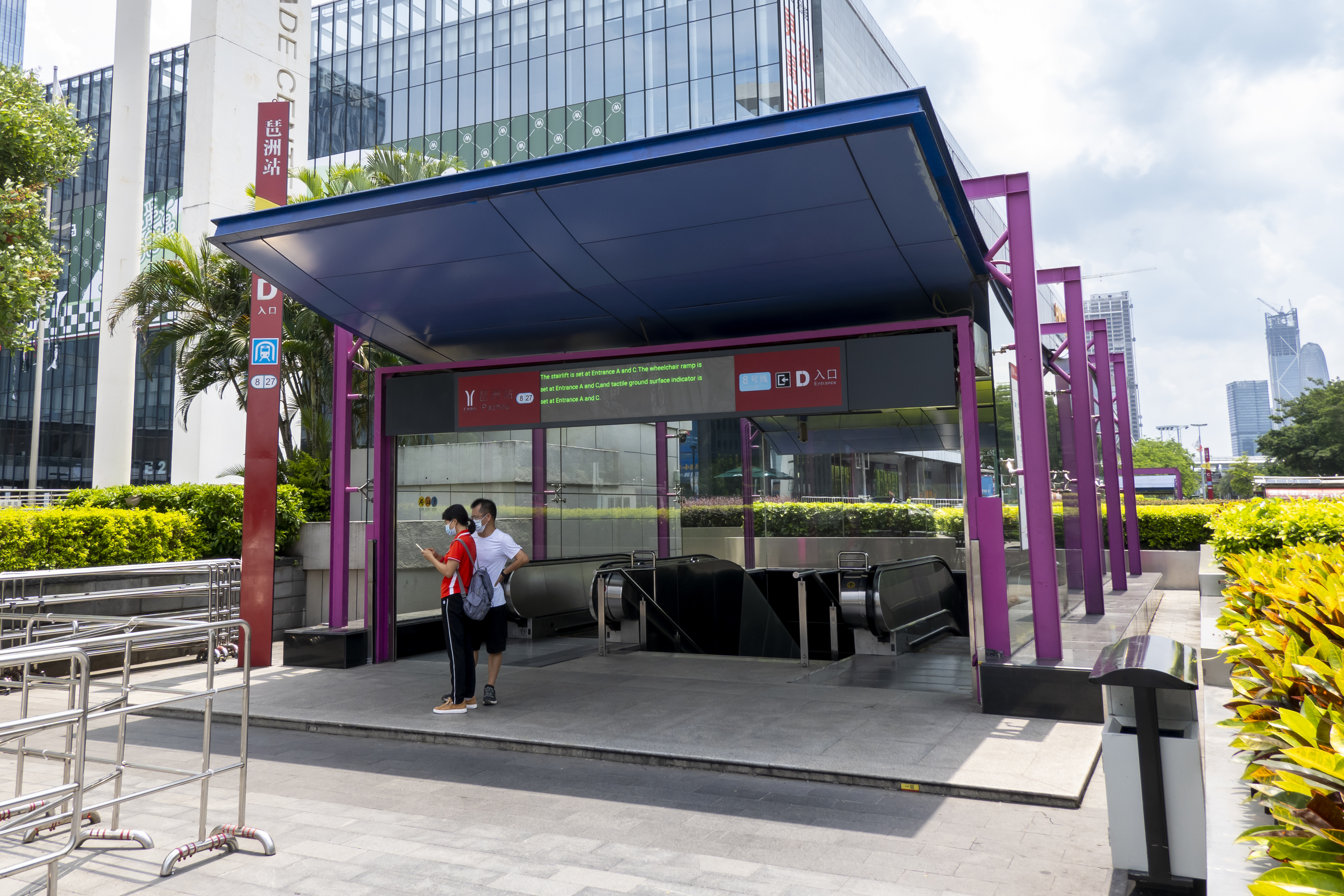
Entrance D

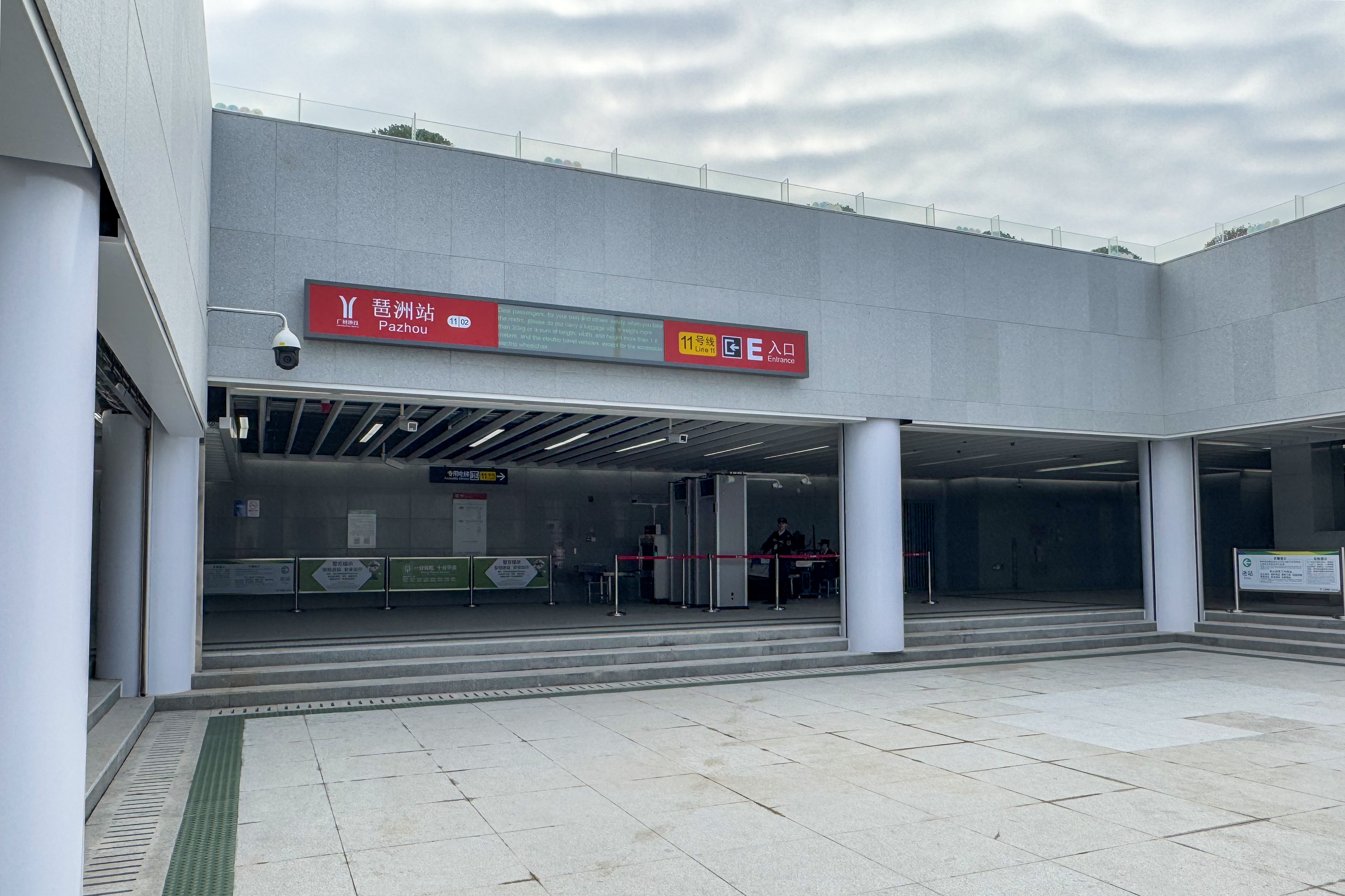
Entrance E

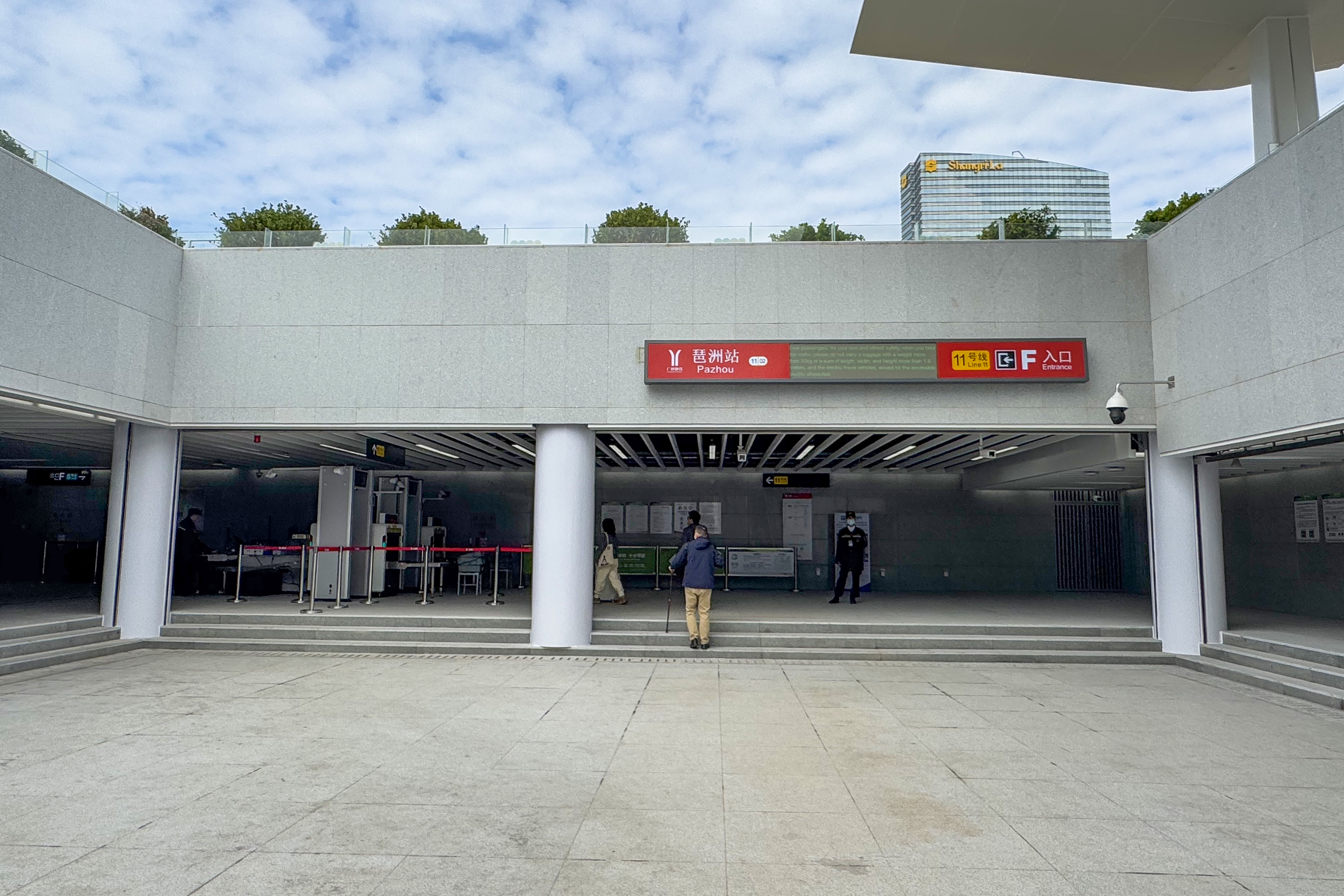
Entrance F

== Transfer style ==
In the original design, Line 11 was planned to connect Line 8 to the paid and non-paid areas of both stations through an underground interchange. After the introduction of the Line 28 (Fosuiguan Intercity) plan, the original transfer channel location was occupied by the Line 28 station site, so the transfer between Line 11 and Line 8 was also changed to be carried out through the Line 28 concourse. However, because the construction of Line 28 has not yet been approved, if the transfer passageway is implemented first, it will still need to be enclosed and renovated during future Line 28 construction. Therefore, the metro decided to implement virtual transfers at this station, making it the first virtual transfer station on the Guangzhou metro network.

During the construction of Line 11, a 220-meter-long ground corridor was set up between the Line 8 station and the planned Line 28, which connects Exit A of Line 8 and Exit F of Line 11, and it takes about 6 minutes to walk its entirety. After exiting the station through the blue faregate dedicated to transfer, passengers can enter another line's station within 30 minutes through the same gate, which counts as a transfer at the same station, and the fare calculation will not be affected. Holders of single-journey tickets and other types of tickets can also use virtual transfers, and one-way tickets will not be collected when exiting the dedicated faregates. However, security checks are still required when re-entering the station.

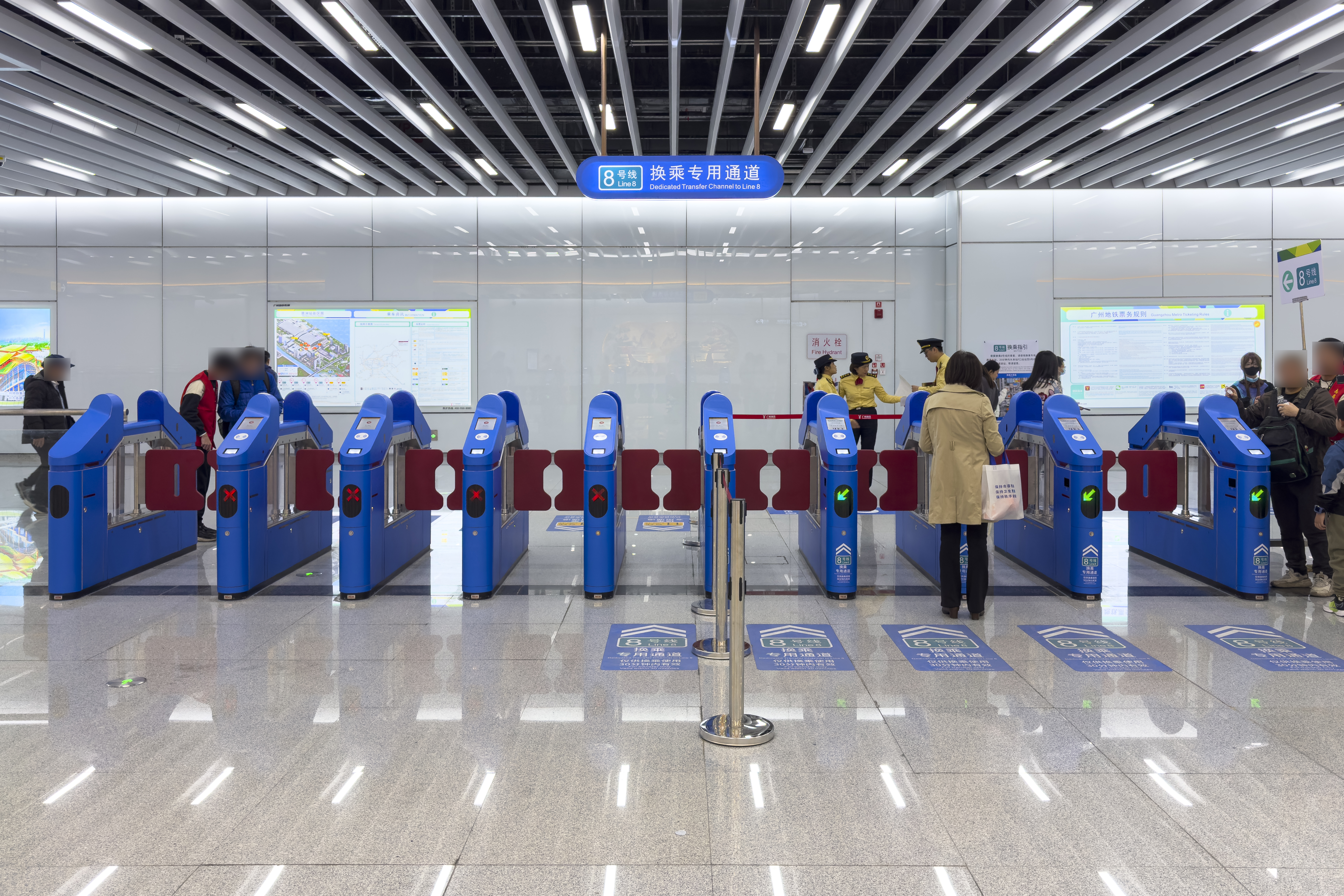
Line 11 blue transfer faregates

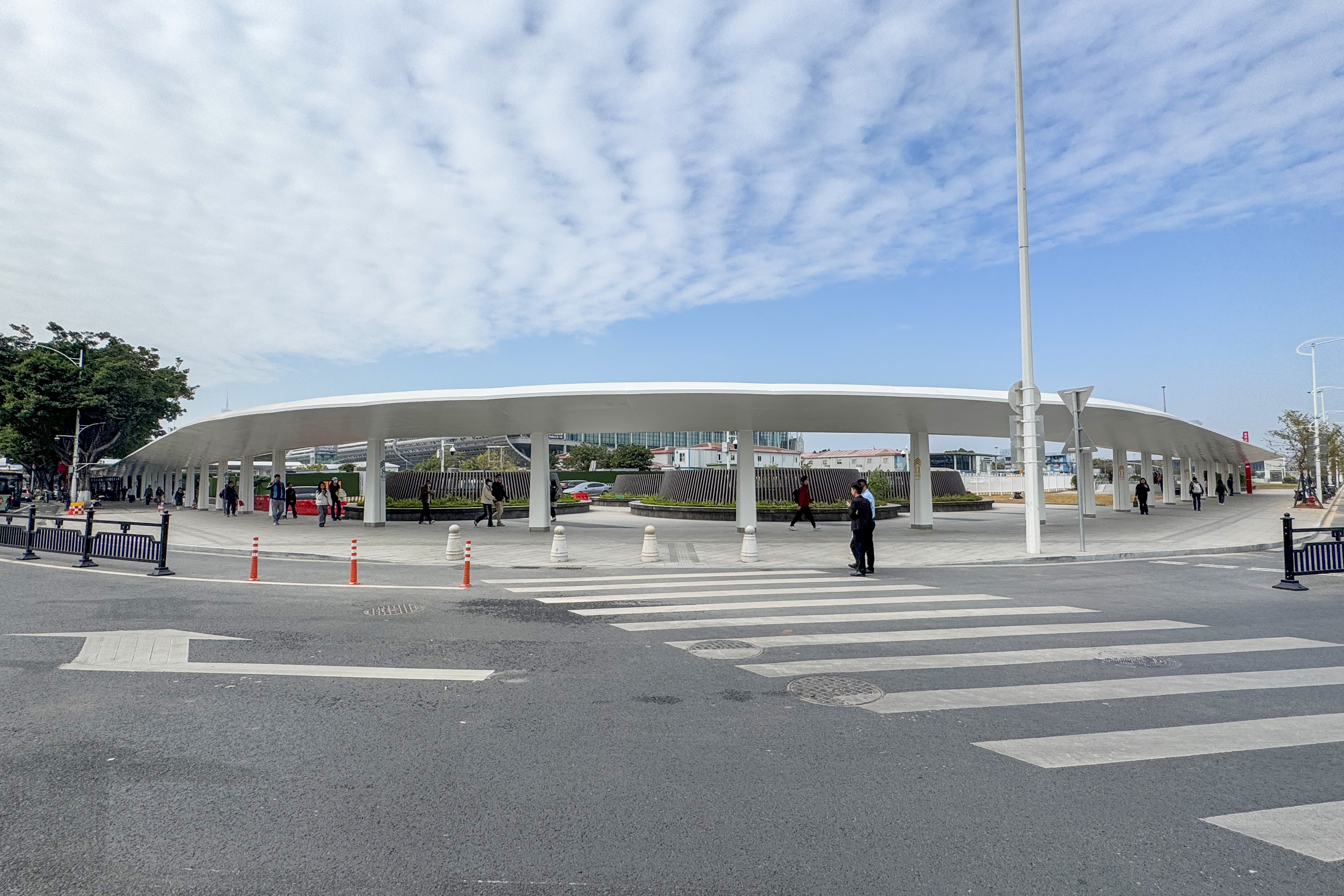
Virtual transfer corridor between Lines 8 & 11 at ground level

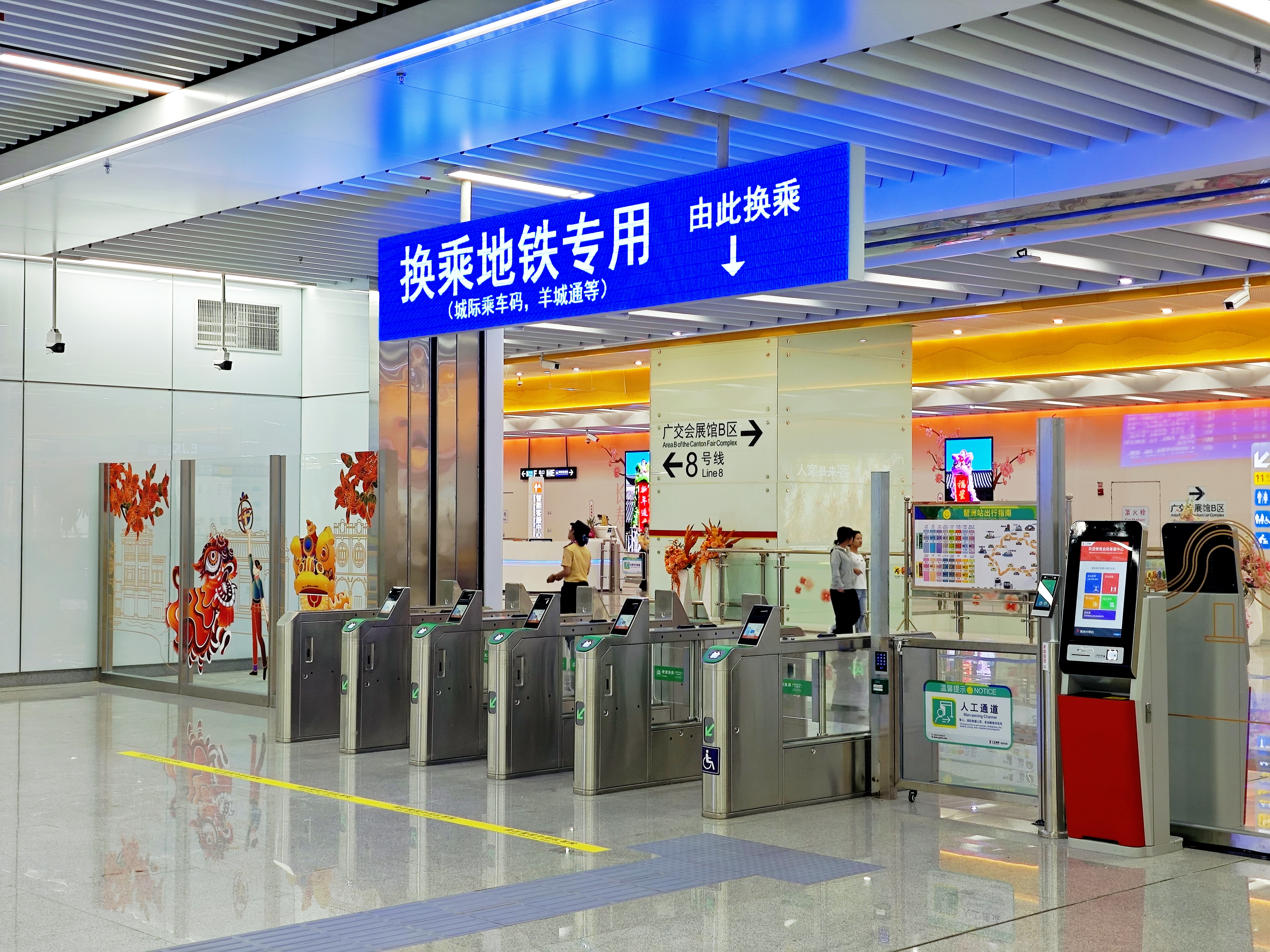
Transfer gates between the Intercity and Line 11 concourses

== Usage ==
The station is one of the transportation facilities of the Guangzhou International Convention and Exhibition Center (Canton Fair Complex), when the Convention and Exhibition Center holds the Canton Fair or other activities, many merchants and visitors will use the station to get there, so the station will have its flow of people doubled, or even overflow. In case of special circumstances or a surge in passenger flow, the station will implement passenger flow control and temporary closure measures to manage passenger flow. For example, on 1 October 2009, Guangzhou held a fireworks show to celebrate the 60th anniversary of the People's Republic of China on the Pearl River near the Convention and Exhibition Center.

== Gallery ==
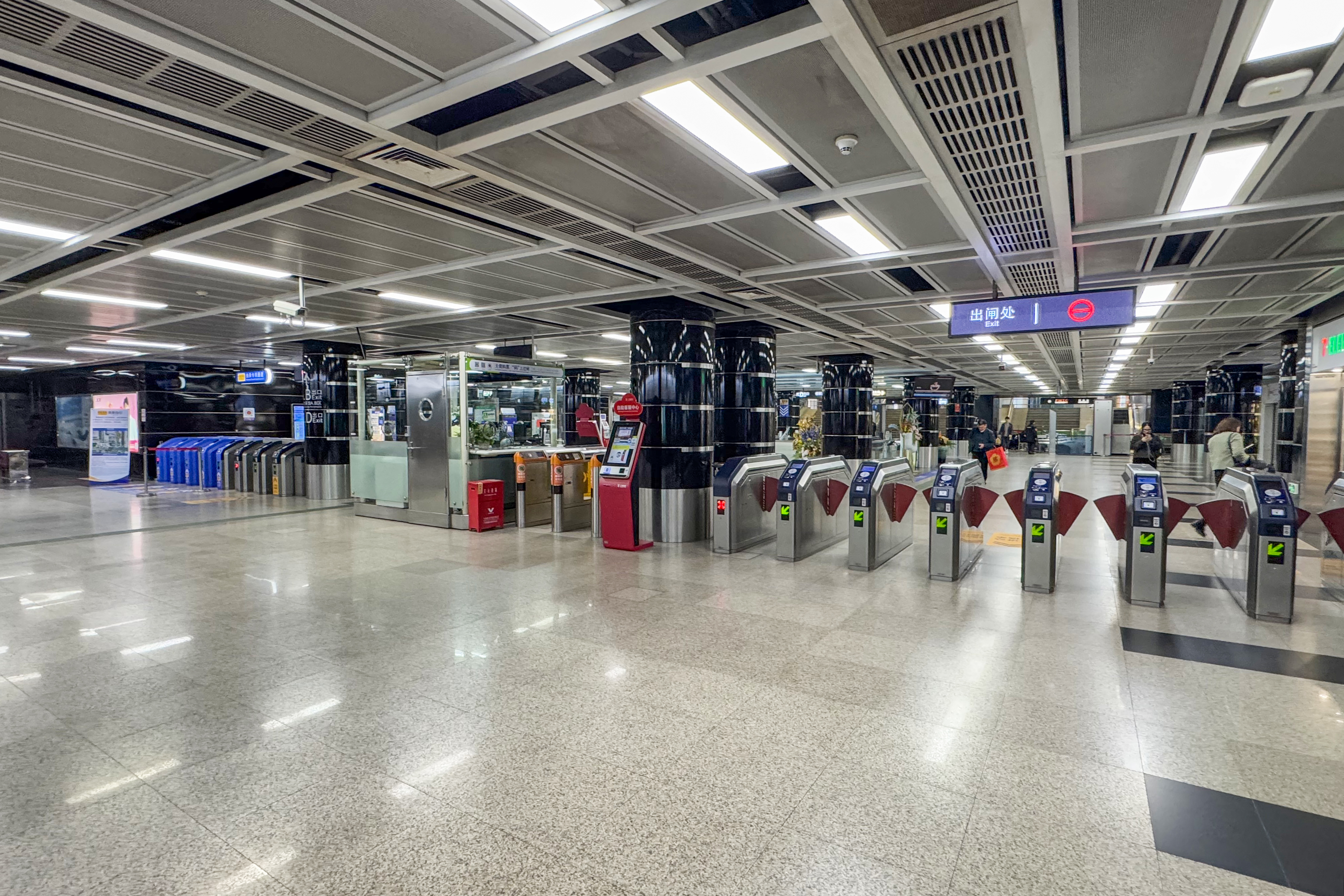
Line 8 south concourse

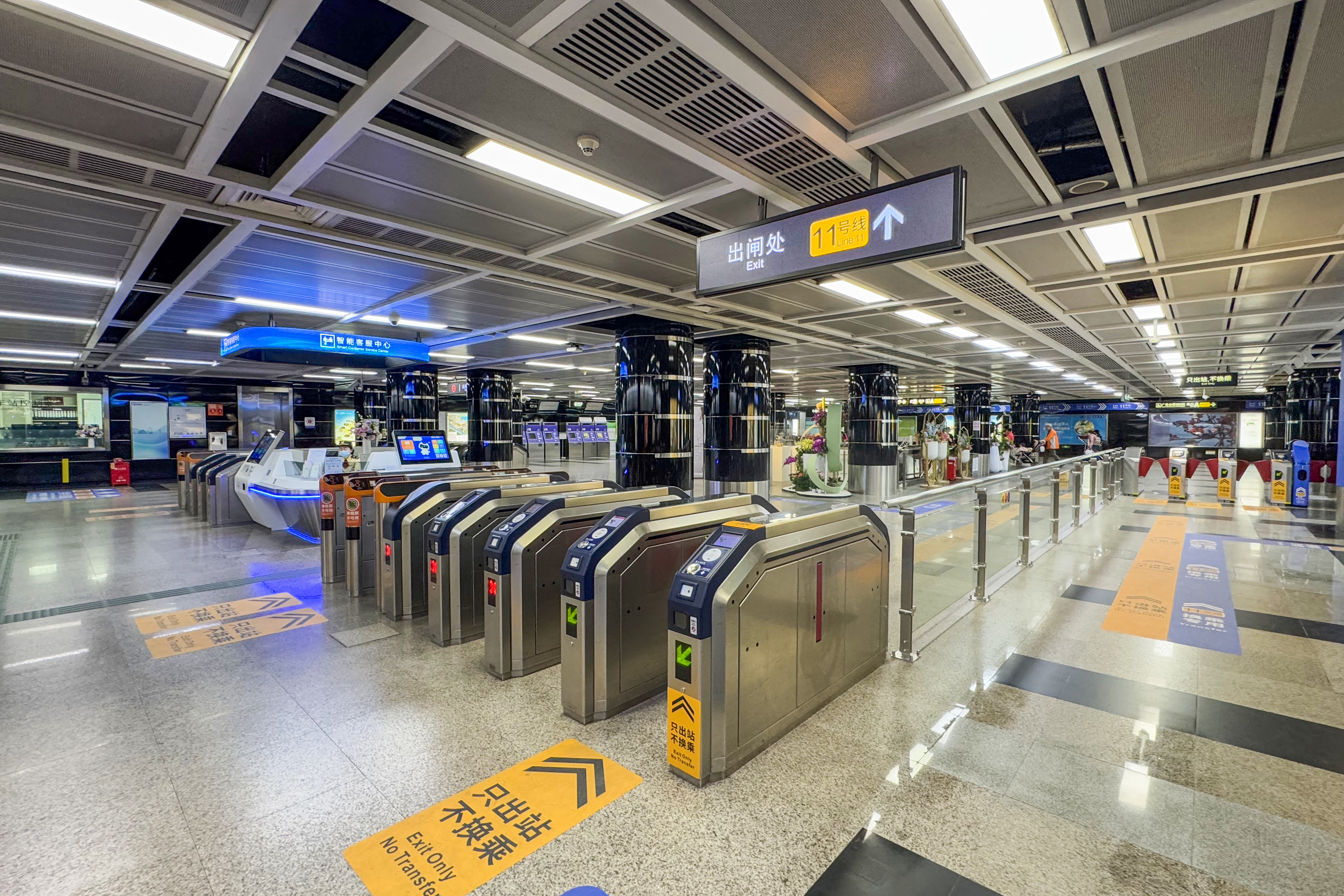
Line 8 north concourse

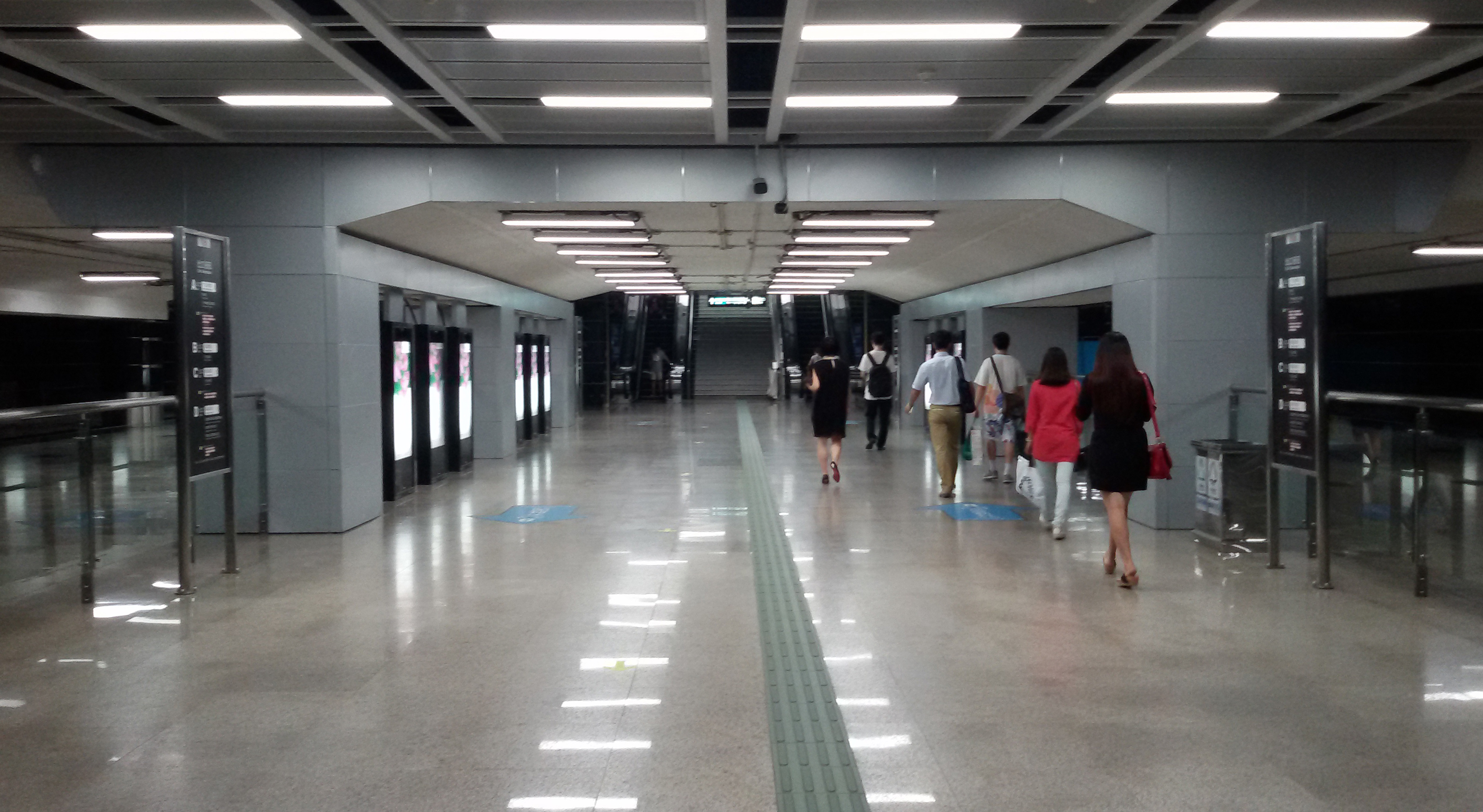
Line 8 unpaid connecting passage

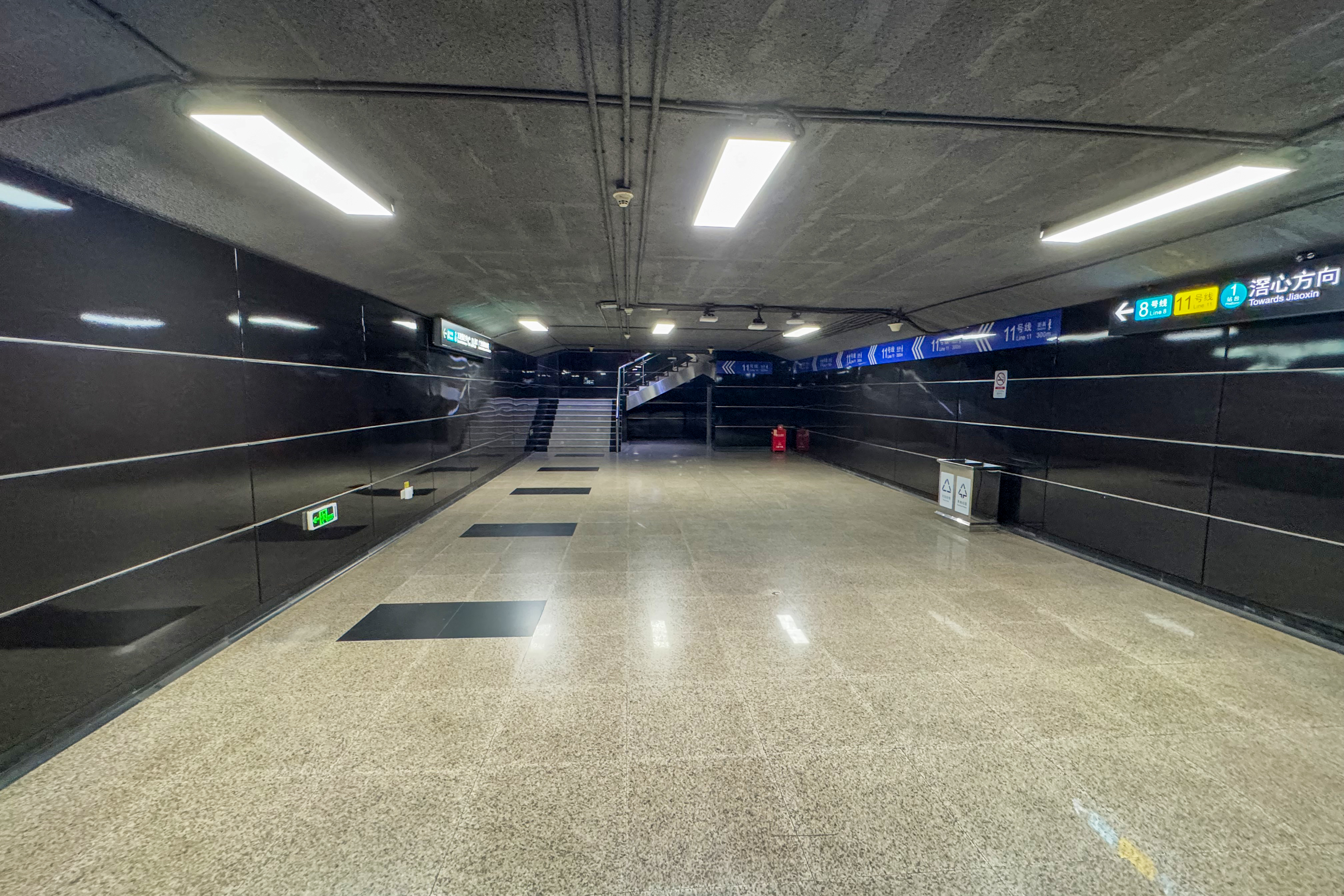
Line 8 paid connecting passage

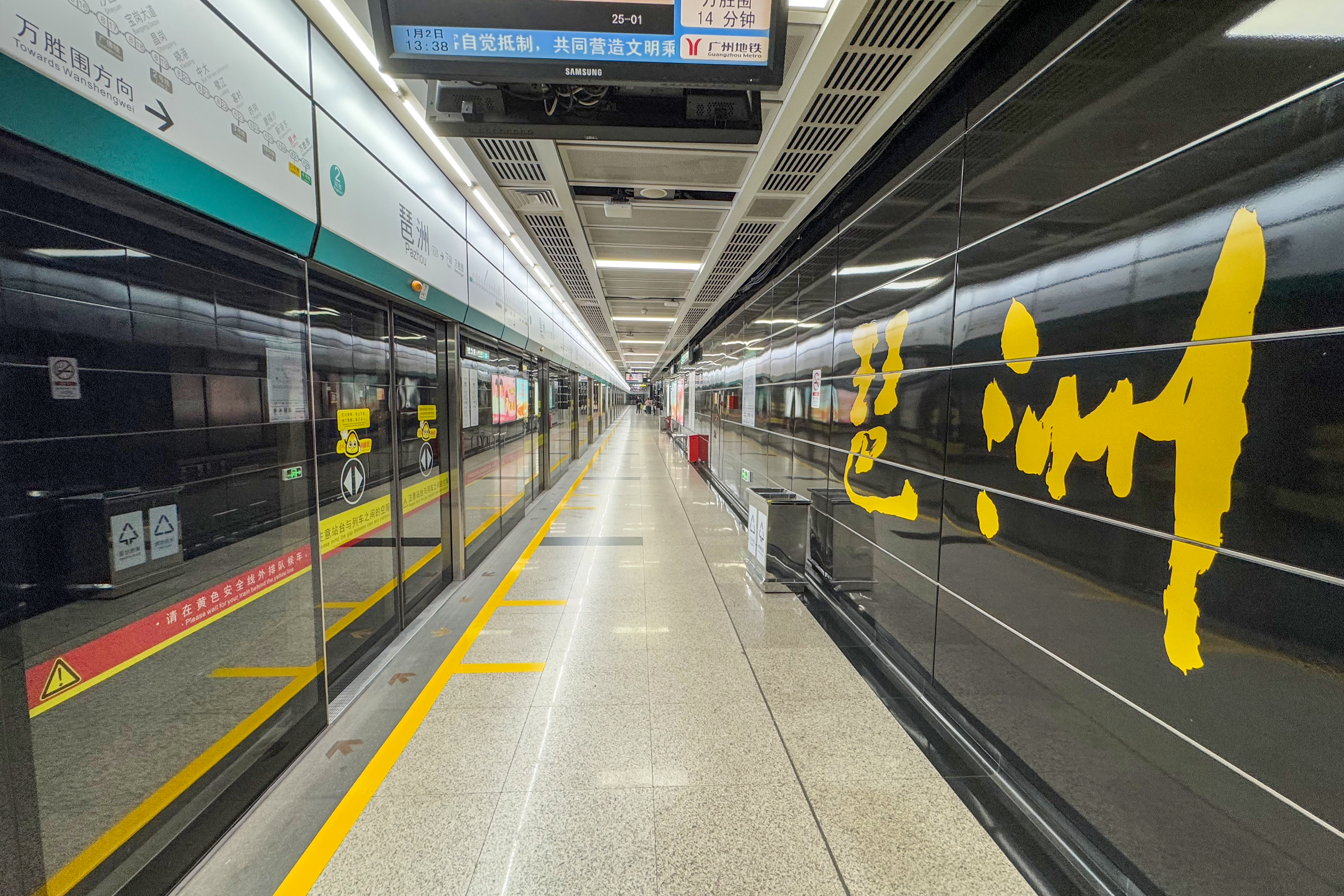
Line 8 platform 2

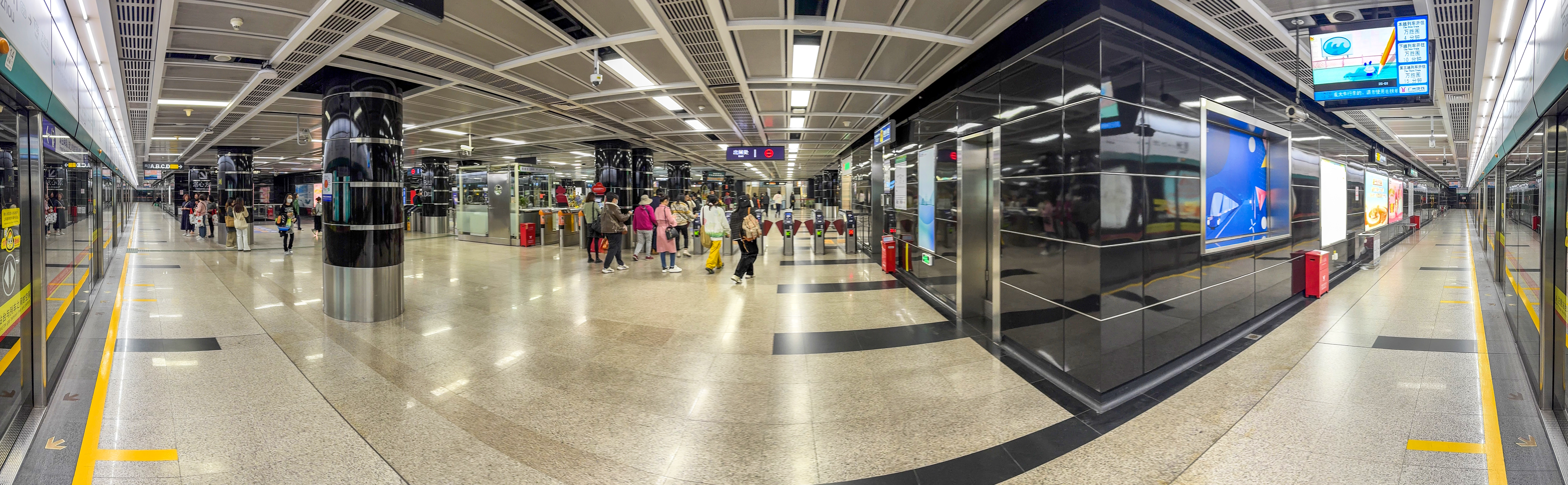
Line 8 platform 2 panorama

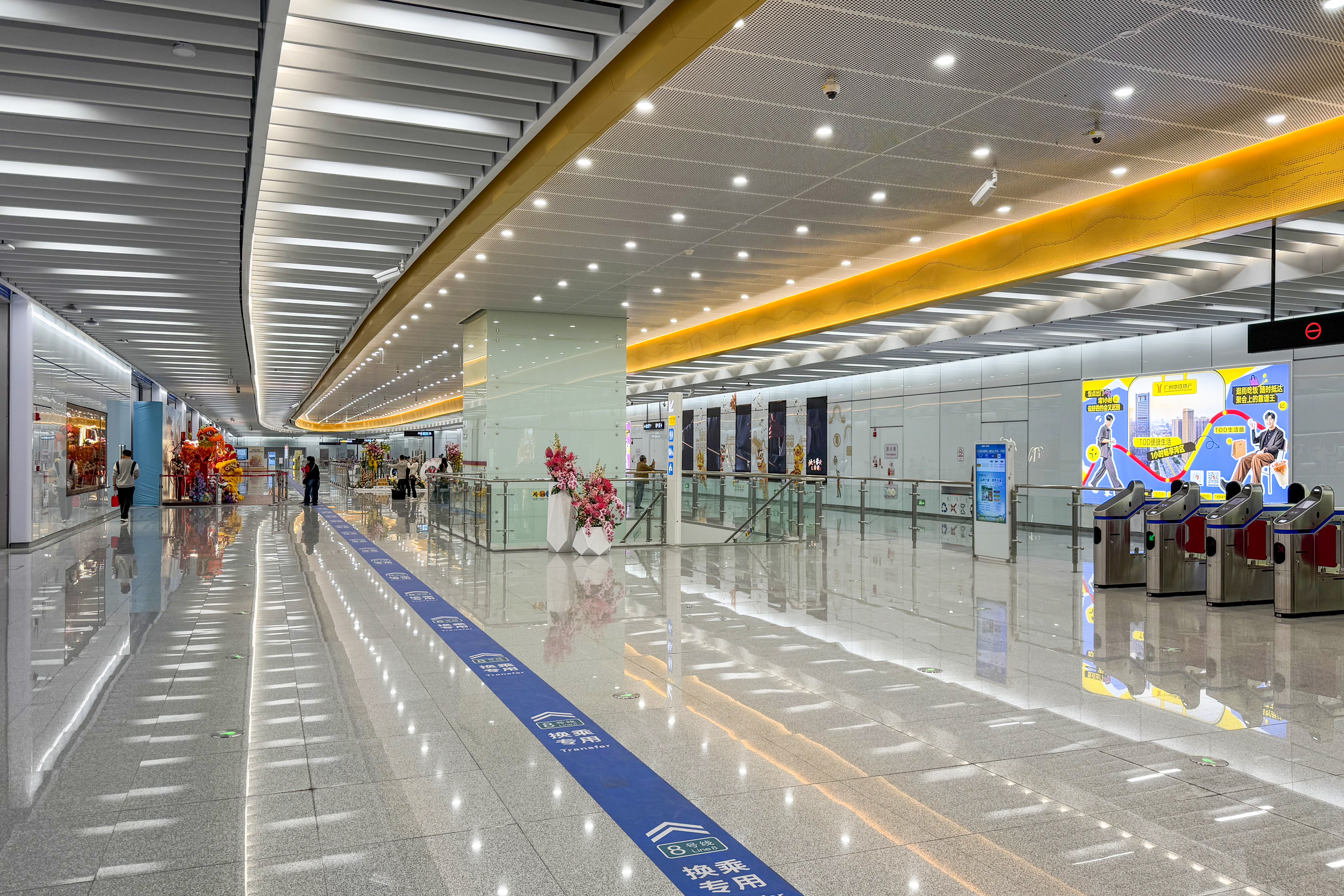
Line 11 concourse

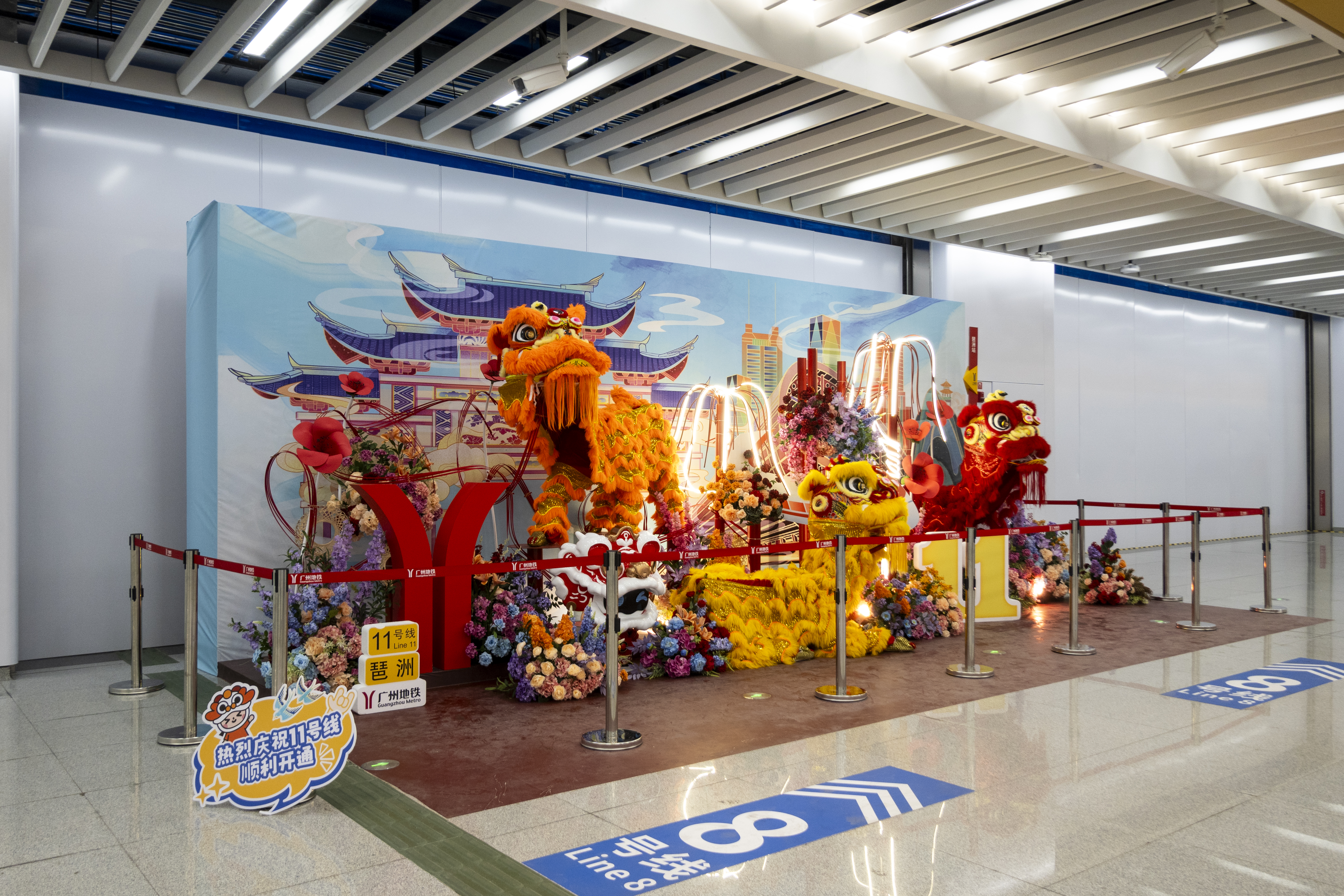
Decorations at Line 11 concourse, with the transfer passageway to the then under construction intercity railway sealed up behind

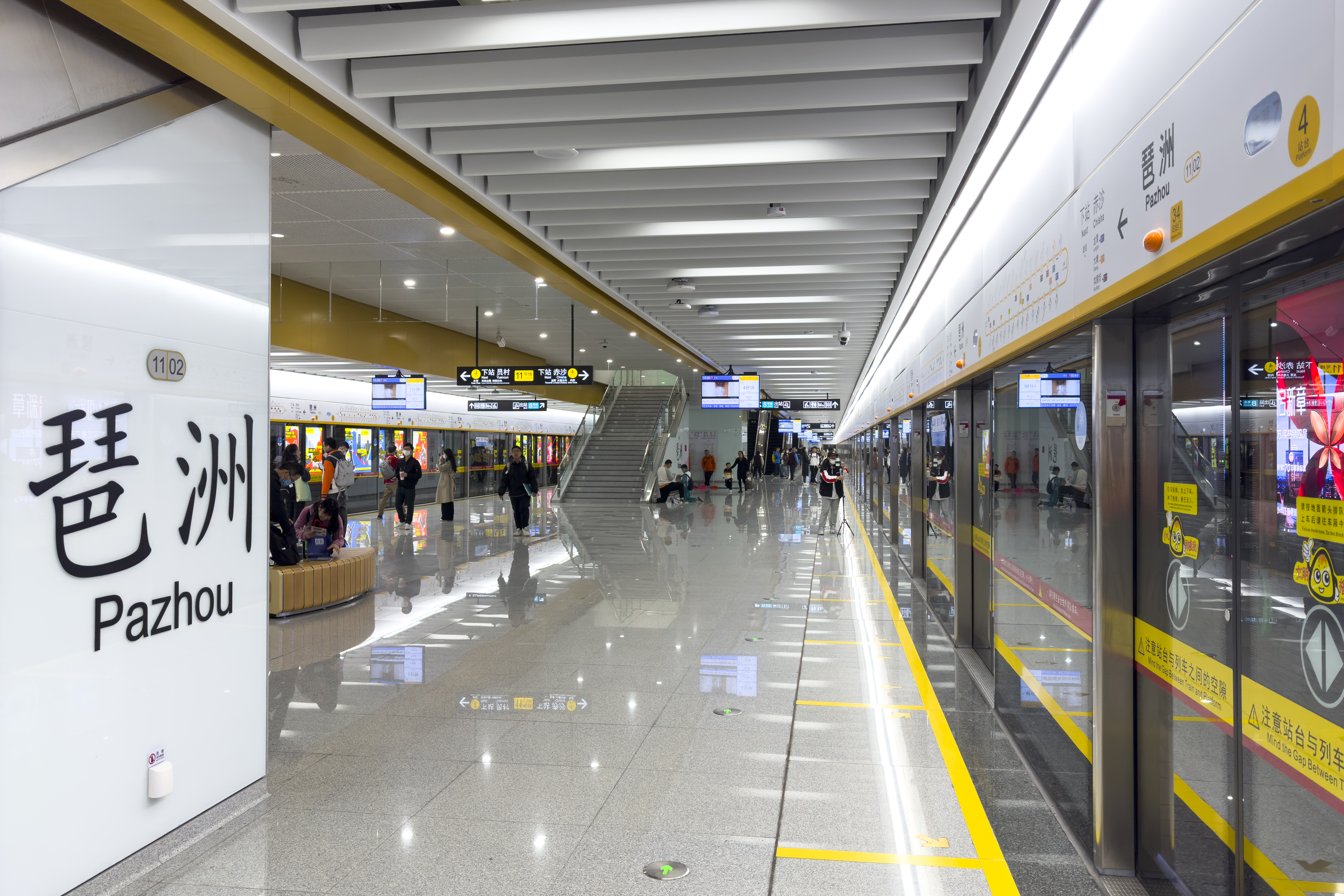
Line 11 platform 4

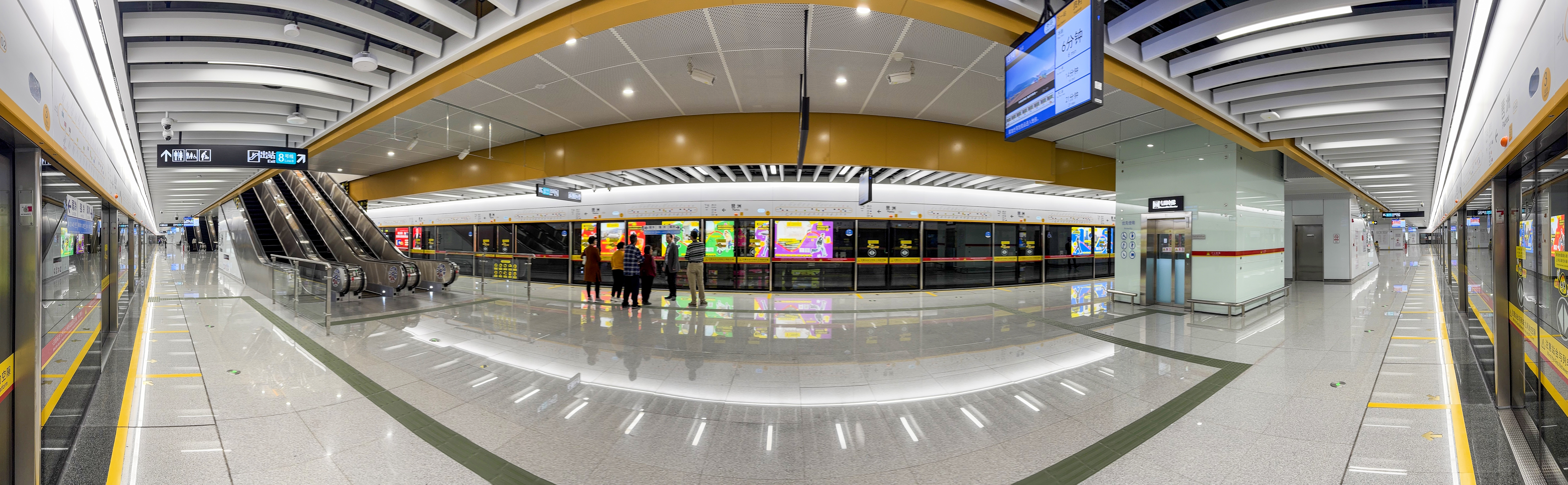
Line 11 platform 3 panorama

== History ==
=== Planning and construction ===
This station first appeared in 1997 in the "Guangzhou City Urban Expressway, Traffic Line Planning Research (Final Report)", and was one of the intermediate stations of Line 5 at that time. Later, the station was decided to be built as part of the first phase of Line 2.

In the 2008 planning plan, Line 8 became a new major ring line, and the section from this station to Wanshengwei will be dismantled and extended into another line, providing an interchange at this station. In the 2010 plan, the final ring line became the current Line 11 (Great Ring Line), while Line 8 resumed its current planned direction, and Line 11 and Line 8 were intersected at the station. It was not until 2012 that Line 11 was included in the 12th Five-Year Plan for Rail Transportation in Guangzhou and was approved for construction.

The Pazhou Station Project of Line 11 built an intercity railway station on the east side of the station. The two stations were constructed simultaneously, and the main structure was topped out in April 2023.

=== Operation ===
On 28 June 2003, the station was officially put into use and was the eastern terminus of the opened section of Line 2 (between Pazhou Station and Sanyuanli Station). On 26 December 2005, Wanshengwei Station was completed and put into operation, and the original Line 2 was extended from Pazhou Station to Wanshengwei Station as its eastern terminus, with Pazhou Station changing from a terminal station to an intermediate station. From 22 to 24 September 2010, the station was suspended along with the old Line 2 for line dismantling. In the early morning of September 25, the station resumed service and was reassigned to the new Line 8.

On 28 December 2024, Line 11 began operations, and the station became an interchange station.

== Future development ==
The planned Line 28 (Fosuiguan Intercity) will have its station between the current Line 8 and Line 11 stations. The platforms of Line 11 and intercity Pazhou railway station have reserved transfer nodes to the Line 28 platform, and the concourse of the aforementioned line's station body and the connecting passageway on the second basement floor of Line 8 are also planned to be connected, which means all lines will be able to transfer within the station instead of the current virtual transfer.
