= Nansha Port railway =

Railway line in Guangdong, China

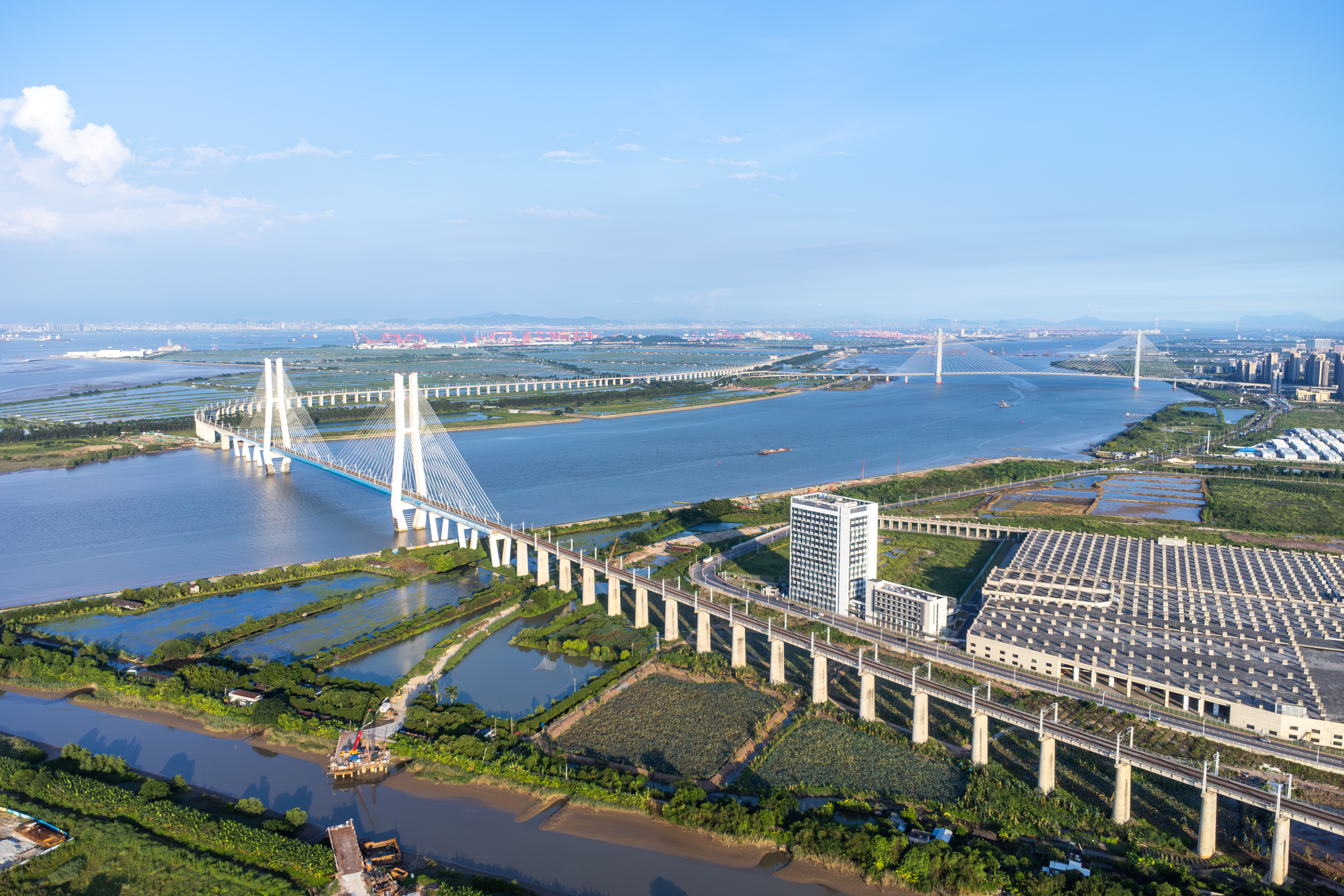
- Longxuenan Waterway Bridge in Nansha, Guangzhou

Overview
- Native name: 南沙港铁路
- Status: In operation
- Termini: Yayao; Nansha Port South

Service
- Type: Heavy rail

Technical
- Line length: 88 km (55 mi)
- Track gauge: 1,435 mm (4 ft 8 1/2 in) standard gauge
- Electrification: 50 Hz 25,000 V
- Operating speed: 120 km/h (75 mph)

The Nansha Port railway (Chinese: 南沙港铁路; pinyin: Nánshāgǎng tiělù) is a railway line in Guangdong Province, China.

== History ==
Construction began in 2016. During construction, this line was changed from a freight-only railway to a combined passenger and freight line. It opened on 31 December 2021 for freight. Nansha Port South railway station opened on 8 February 2022. Passenger services and the passenger-only railway stations are still under construction.

== Design ==
The line is electrified and double-tracked, 88 kilometres (55 mi) long, and will have a maximum speed of 120 kilometres per hour (75 mph). It leaves the existing Guangzhou–Zhuhai railway at Yayao and heads east.

== Stations ==
- Yayao (railway signal station)
- Tangxia (U/C)
- Jun'an (U/C)
- Dongfeng (U/C)
- Huangpu (U/C)
- Wanqingsha (planning)
- Nansha (U/C) (interchange to Guangzhou Metro Line 18 via Wanqingsha metro station)
- Nansha Port (freight)
- Nansha Port South (freight)
