= Shaxi station =

Guangzhou Metro station

Shaxi 沙溪
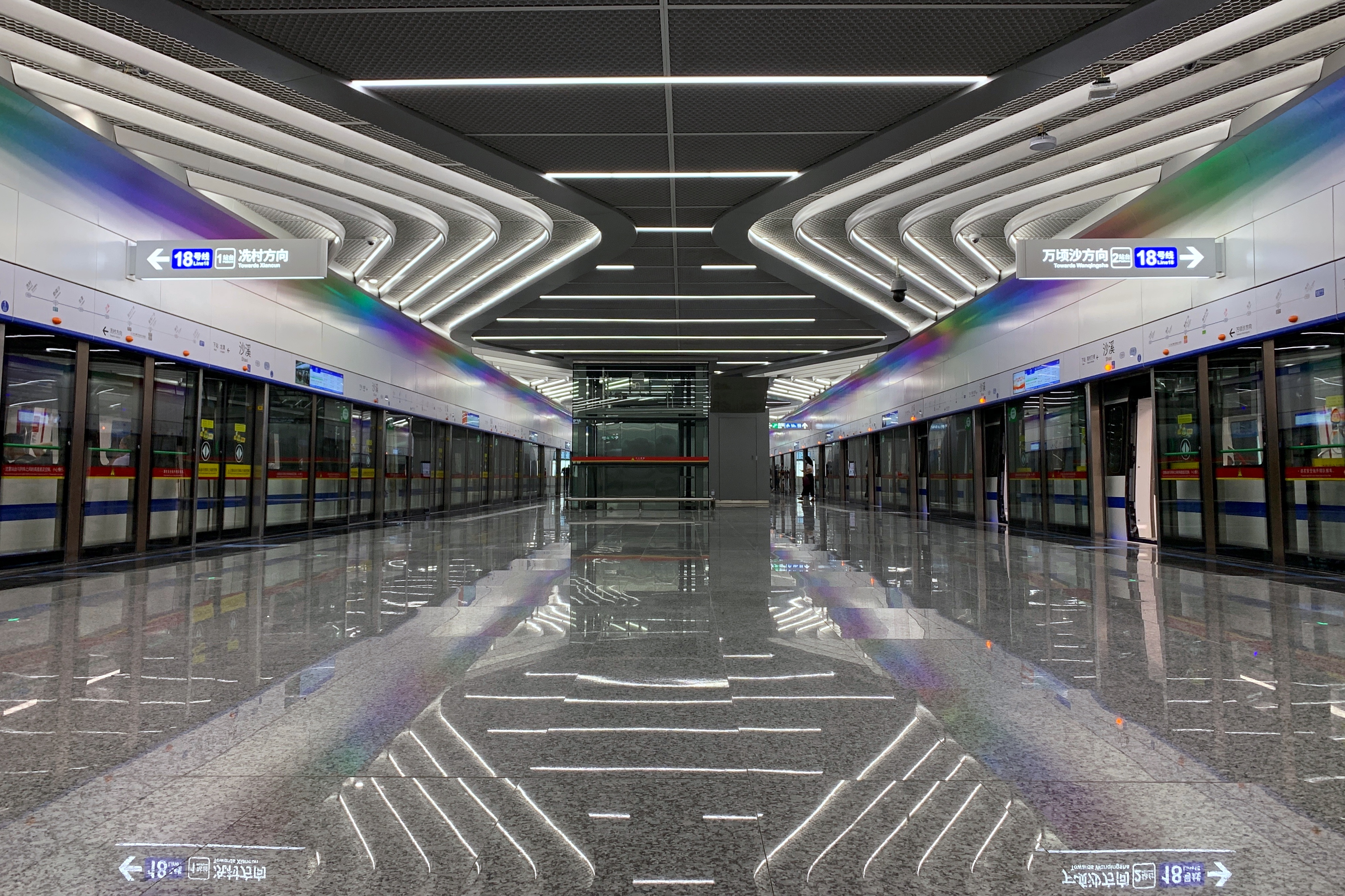
- Platform

Chinese name
- Chinese: 沙溪站
Transcriptions
Standard Mandarin
- Hanyu Pinyin: Shāxī Zhàn
Yue: Cantonese
- Jyutping: saa^{1}kai^{1} zaam^{6}

General information
- Location: Northwest of the intersection of Panyu Bridge (番禺大桥) and Shaxi Avenue (沙溪大道), Shajiao Island (沙滘岛), Panyu District, Guangzhou, Guangdong; China
- Coordinates: 23.038375°N 113.332839°E
- Operated by: Guangzhou Metro Co. Ltd.
- Line: Line 18
- Platforms: 2 (1 island platform)
- Tracks: 4

Construction
- Structure type: Underground
- Accessible: Yes

Other information
- Station code: 1805

History
- Opened: 28 September 2021; 4 years ago

Services
Preceding station	Guangzhou Metro	Following station
Longtan towards Xiancun	Line 18	Nancun Wanbo towards Wanqingsha
Location

Shaxi Station (Chinese: 沙溪站; pinyin: Shāxī Zhàn; Jyutping: saa^{1}kai^{1} zaam^{6}) is a station on Line 18 of the Guangzhou Metro, located underground northwest of the intersection of Panyu Bridge and Shaxi Avenue on Shajiao Island in Guangzhou's Panyu District. It opened on 28 September 2021.

== History ==
In 2014, when the Nansha Express Line was proposed, a station was planned at Shaxi. At the beginning of 2016, in order to meet the requirement that Line 18 can its entire length in 30 minutes, the metro company cancelled the plan for Shaxi Station, which caused dissatisfaction among residents in Shaxi and other areas, and residents sent a letter to the Guangzhou Municipal Development and Reform Commission. Eventually, planning for the station resumed the following year.

== Station information ==
In order to meet the requirements of the rail crossing depth at both ends of the station, the station has a total of 3 floors.

G	Street level	Exits B, C, D
L1; Concourse	North Buffer Area	Toward exits and concourse
L1; Concourse	South Buffer Area	Toward exits and concourse
L2; Concourse	Lobby	Ticket Machines, Customer Service, Shops, Police Station, Safety Facilities
L3; Platforms	Bypass Track	18 express service passing loop
L3; Platforms	Platform 1	18 towards Xiancun (Longtan)
L3; Platforms	Island platform, doors will open on the left
L3; Platforms	Platform 2	18 towards Wanqingsha (Nancun Wanbo)
L3; Platforms	Bypass Track	18 express service passing loop

Exit number	Exit location
Exit A1	Shaxi Dadao
Exit B	Donghua Road
Exit C	Donghua Road
Exit D	Donghua Road
Exit E1	Shaxi Dadao
Exit E2	Shaxi Dadao

== Gallery ==
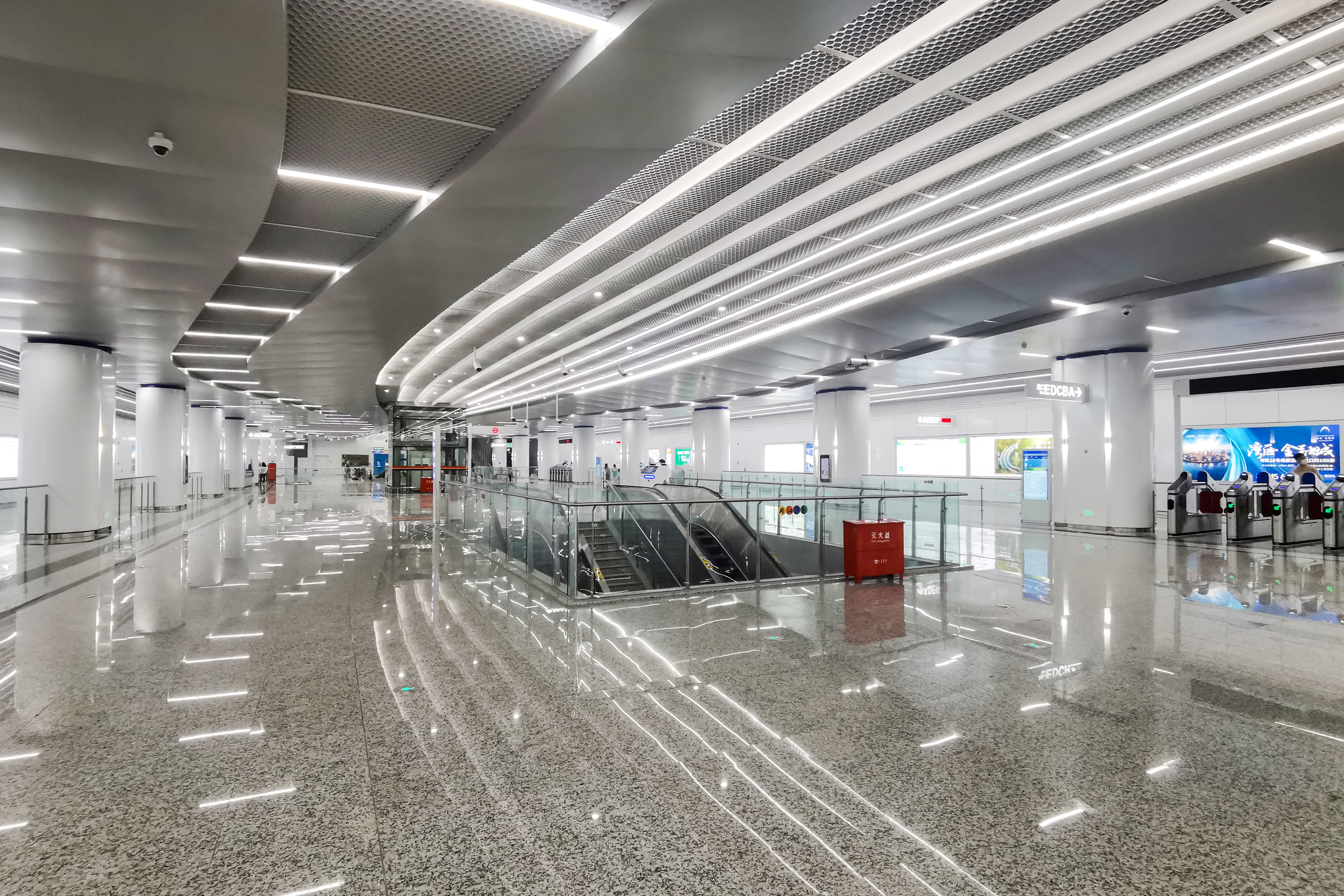
Concourse

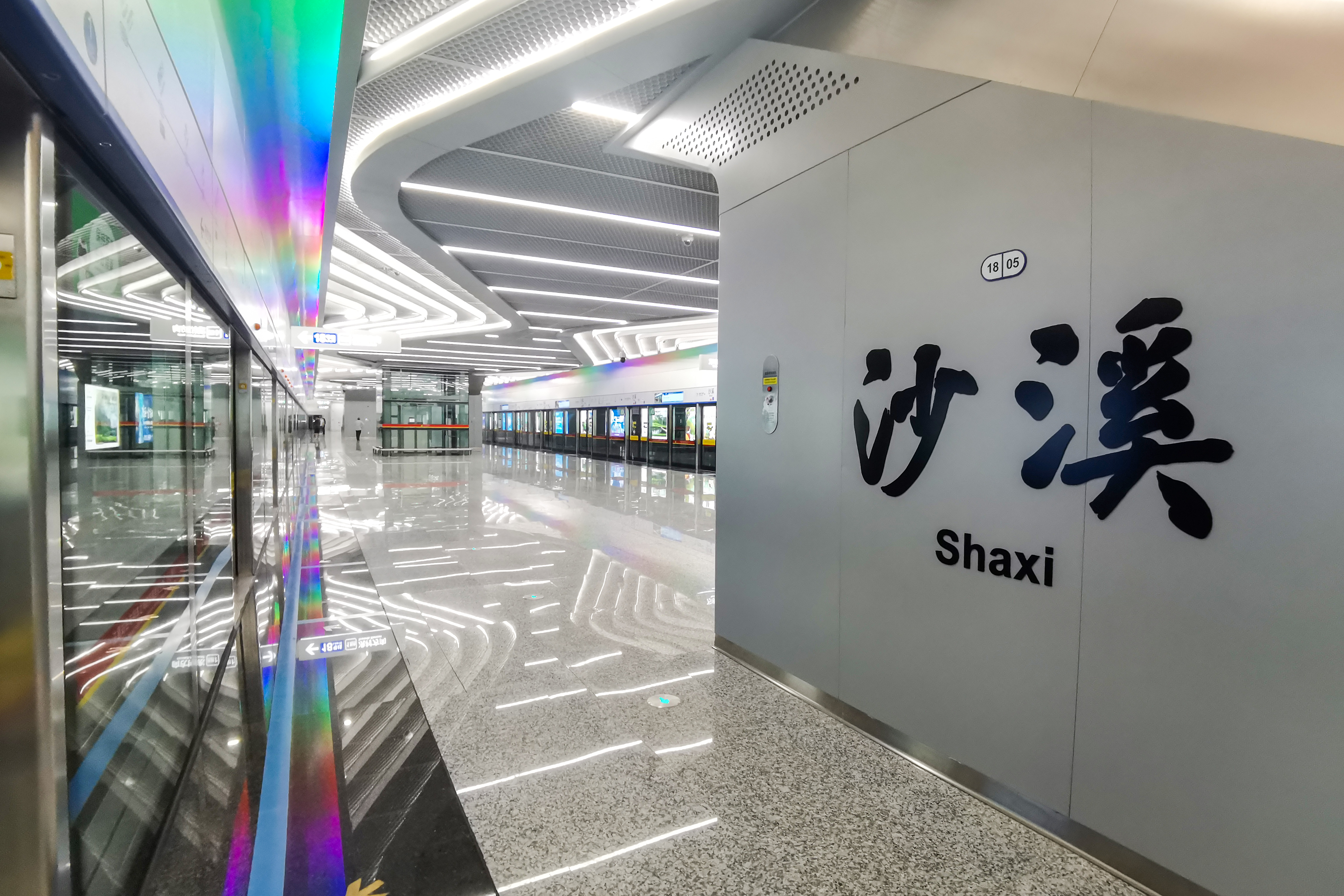
Platform calligraphy
