= Nancun Wanbo station =

Guangzhou Metro station

Nancun Wanbo 南村万博
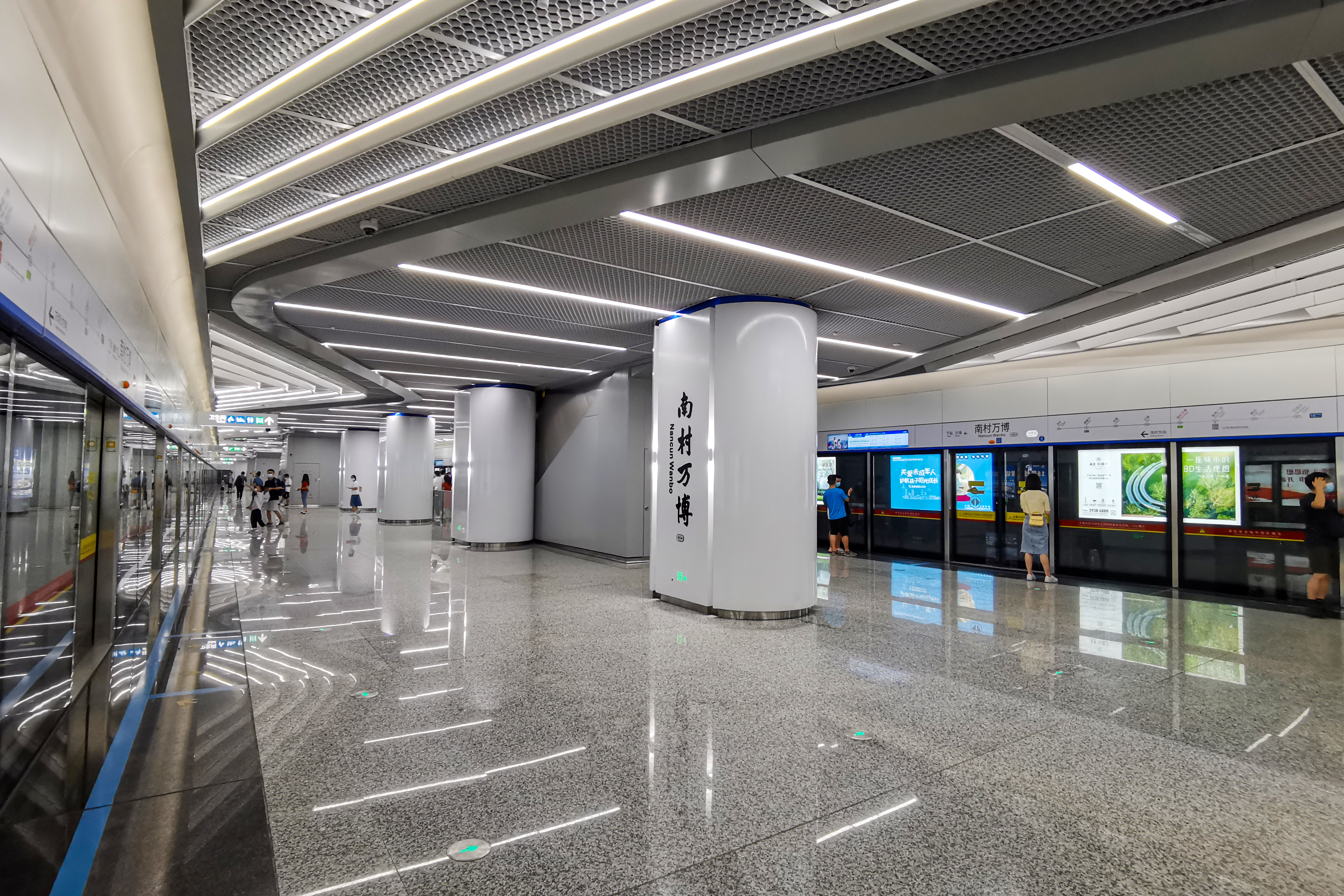
- Line 18 platform

Chinese name
- Simplified Chinese: 南村万博站
- Traditional Chinese: 南村萬博站
Transcriptions
Standard Mandarin
- Hanyu Pinyin: Náncūn Wànbó Zhàn
Yue: Cantonese
- Jyutping: naam^{4}cyun^{1} maan^{6}bok^{3} zaam^{6}

General information
- Location: Panyu District, Guangzhou, Guangdong; China
- Coordinates: 23°00′17″N 113°20′51″E
- Operated by: Guangzhou Metro Co. Ltd.
- Lines: Line 7 Line 18
- Platforms: 4 (2 island platforms)
- Tracks: 6

Construction
- Structure type: Underground
- Accessible: Yes

Other information
- Station code: 706 1804

History
- Opened: Line 7: 28 December 2016; 9 years ago Line 18: 28 September 2021; 4 years ago

Services
Preceding station	Guangzhou Metro	Following station
Hanxi Changlong towards Meidi Dadao	Line 7	Yuangang towards Yanshan
Shaxi towards Xiancun	Line 18	Panyu Square towards Wanqingsha
Modiesha towards Xiancun	Line 18 Express	Panyu Square towards Wanqingsha
Location

Nancun Wanbo station (Chinese: 南村万博站), formerly named as Hezhuang station (鹤庄站), is an interchange station between Line 7 and Line 18 of the Guangzhou Metro. The station is situated under Hanxi Avenue East (汉溪大道东), located in Panyu District, Guangzhou. Line 7 began operations on 28 December 2016 and Line 18 began operations on 28 September 2021.

== Station layout ==
G	Street level	Exits A-D, E1, E2, G
L1	Commerce	Commercial Center
L2; Concourse	Lobby	Ticket Machines, Customer Service, Shops, Police Station, Safety Facilities
L2; Concourse	-	Commercial Center
L3; Platforms	Platform 2	7 towards Meidi Dadao (Hanxi Changlong)
L3; Platforms	Island platform, doors will open on the left
L3; Platforms	Platform 1	7 towards Yanshan (Yuangang)
L4; Equipment Area	-	Station Equipment
L4; Equipment Area	Buffer Area	Buffer area of Line 18
L5; Platforms	Bypass Track	18 express service passing loop (not in passenger use)
L5; Platforms	Platform 3	18 towards Xiancun (Shaxi / express: Modiesha)
L5; Platforms	Island platform, doors will open on the left
L5; Platforms	Platform 4	18 towards Wanqingsha (Panyu Square)
L5; Platforms	Bypass Track	18 express service passing loop (not in passenger use)

== Exits ==
Exit number	Exit location
Exit A	Panyu Dadaobei
Exit B	Hanxi Dadaodong
Exit C	Hanxi Dadaodong
Exit D	Panyu Dadaobei
Exit E1	Hanxi Dadaodong
Exit E2	Hanxi Dadaodong
Exit G	Panyu Dadaobei

== Gallery ==
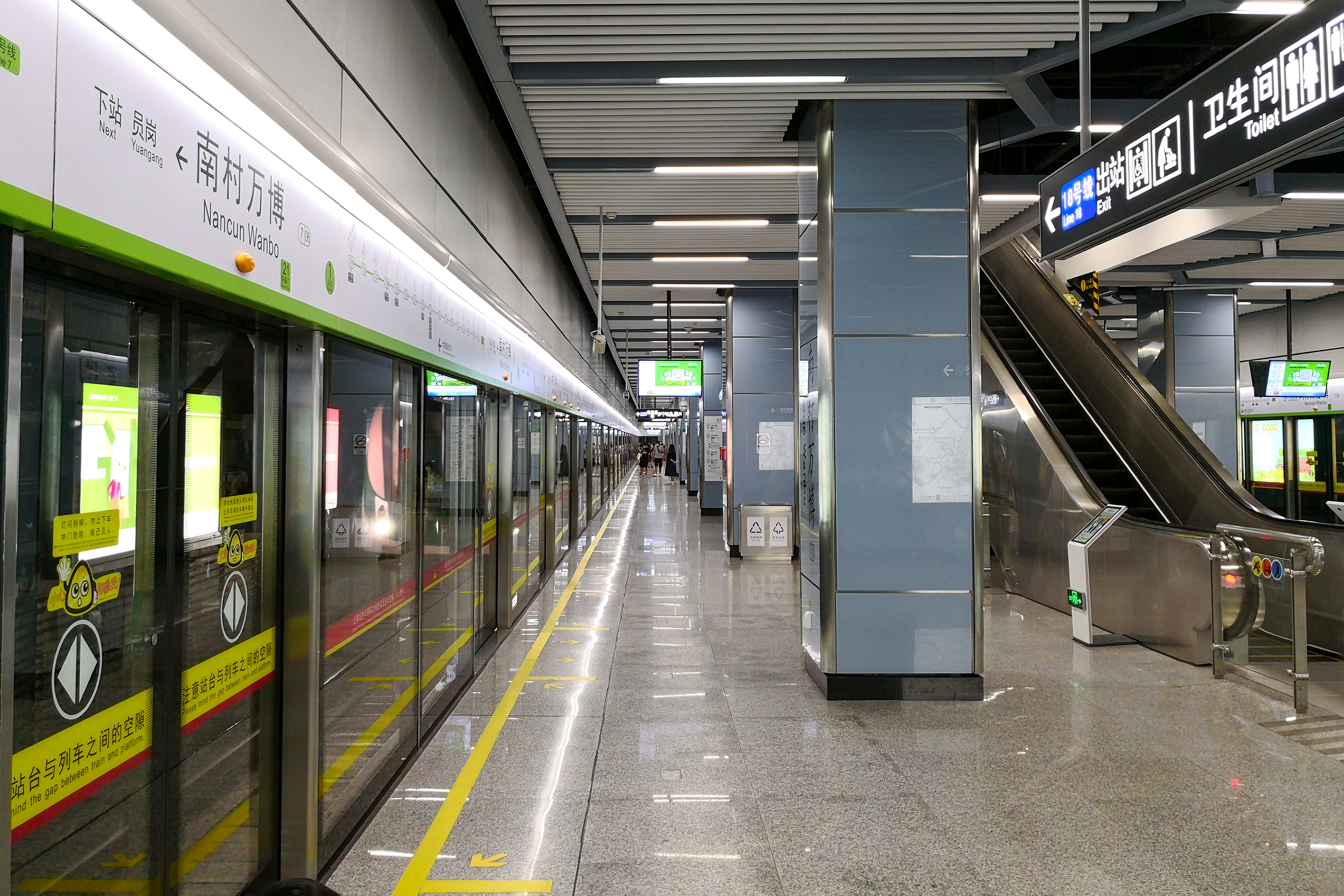
Platform 1 (Line 7 eastbound platform)

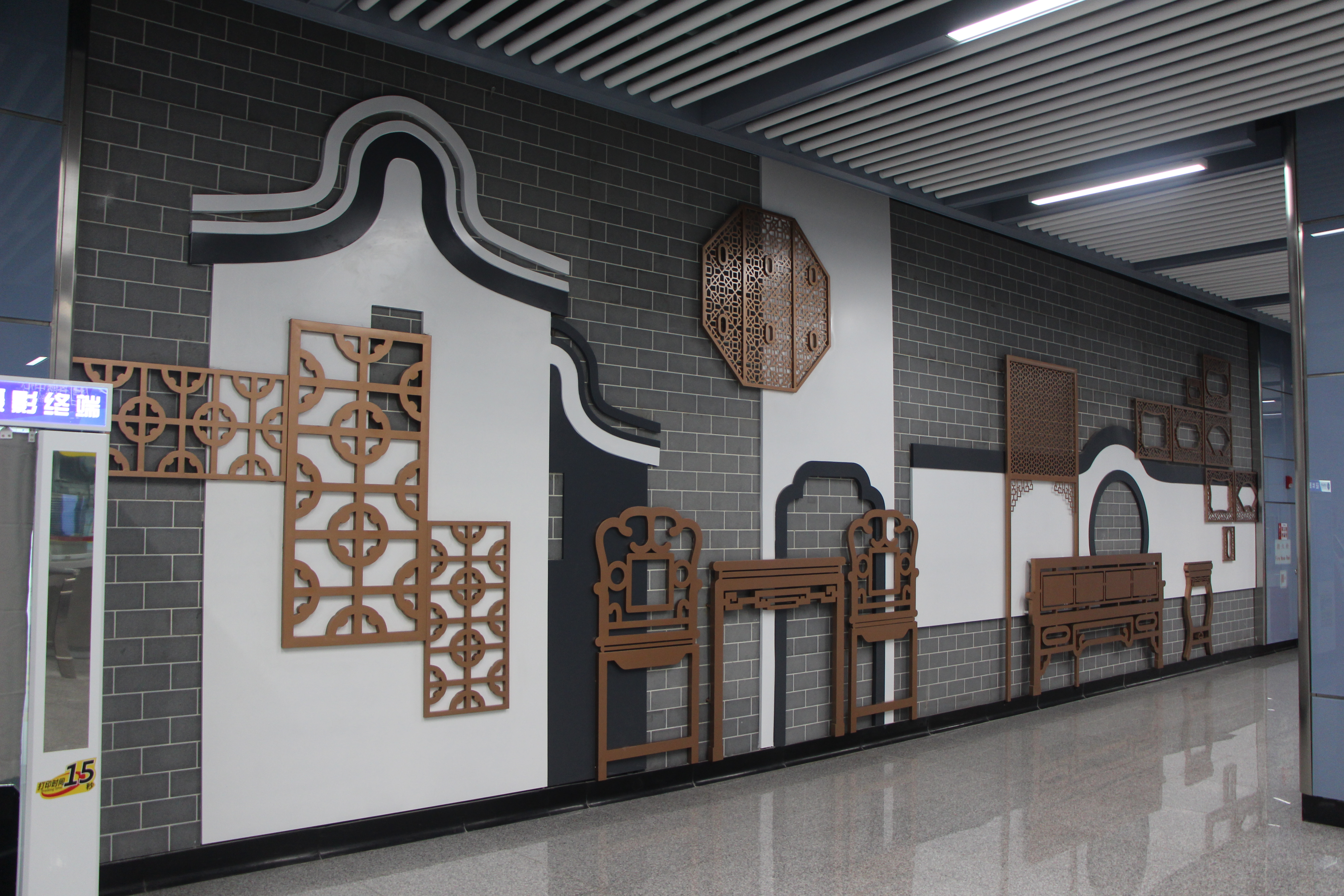
Line 7 concourse artwork

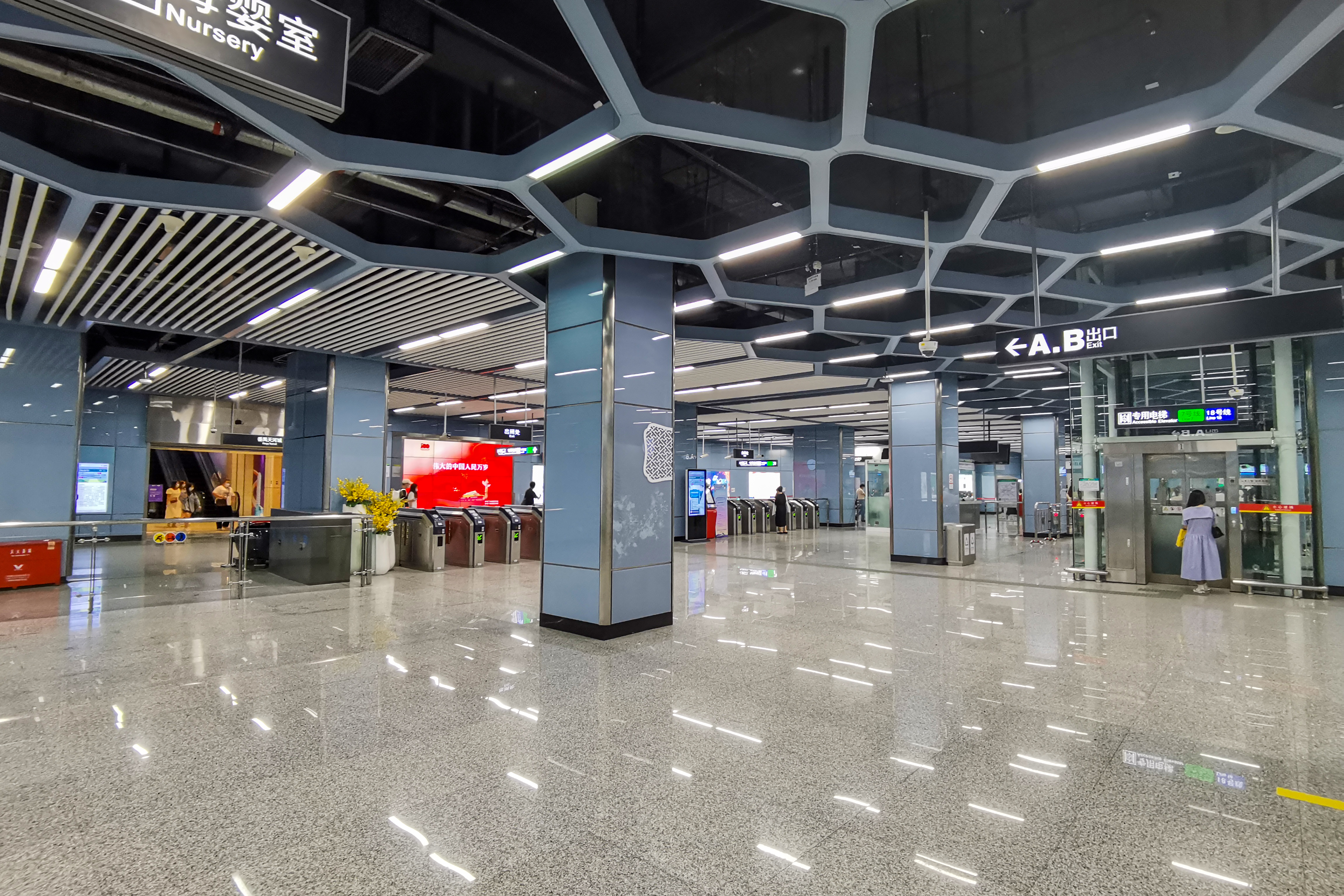
Line 7 concourse

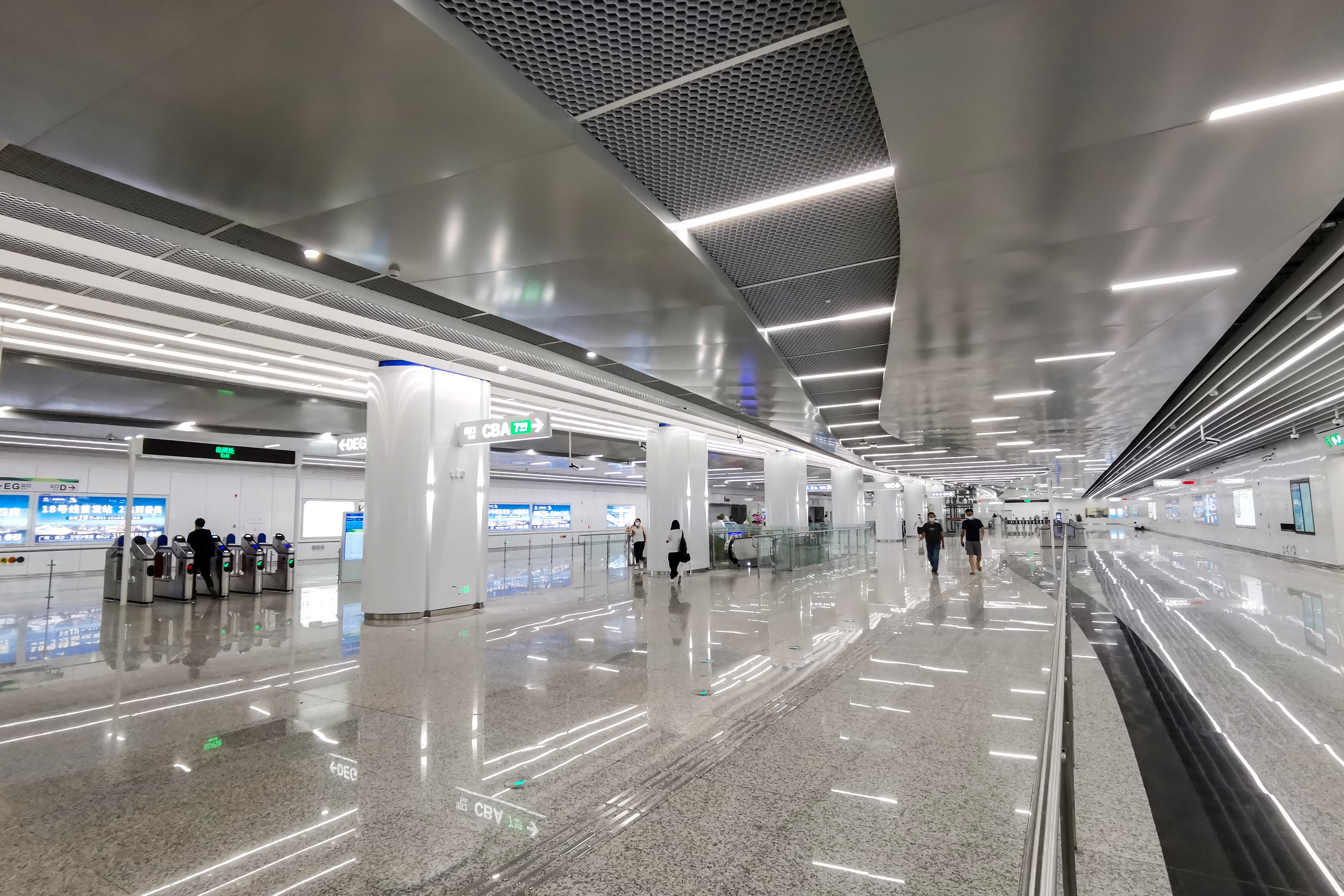
Line 18 concourse

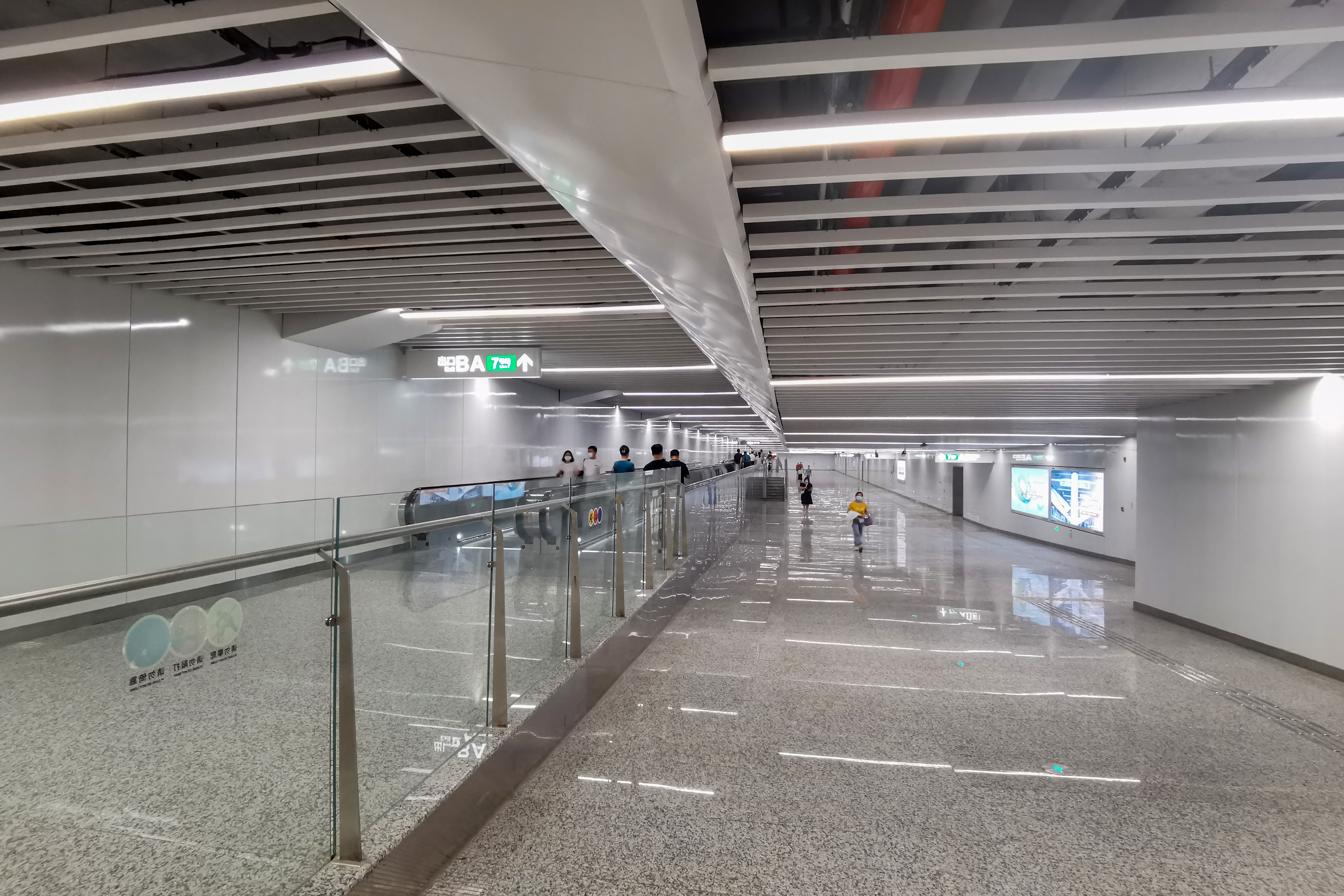
Transfer corridor

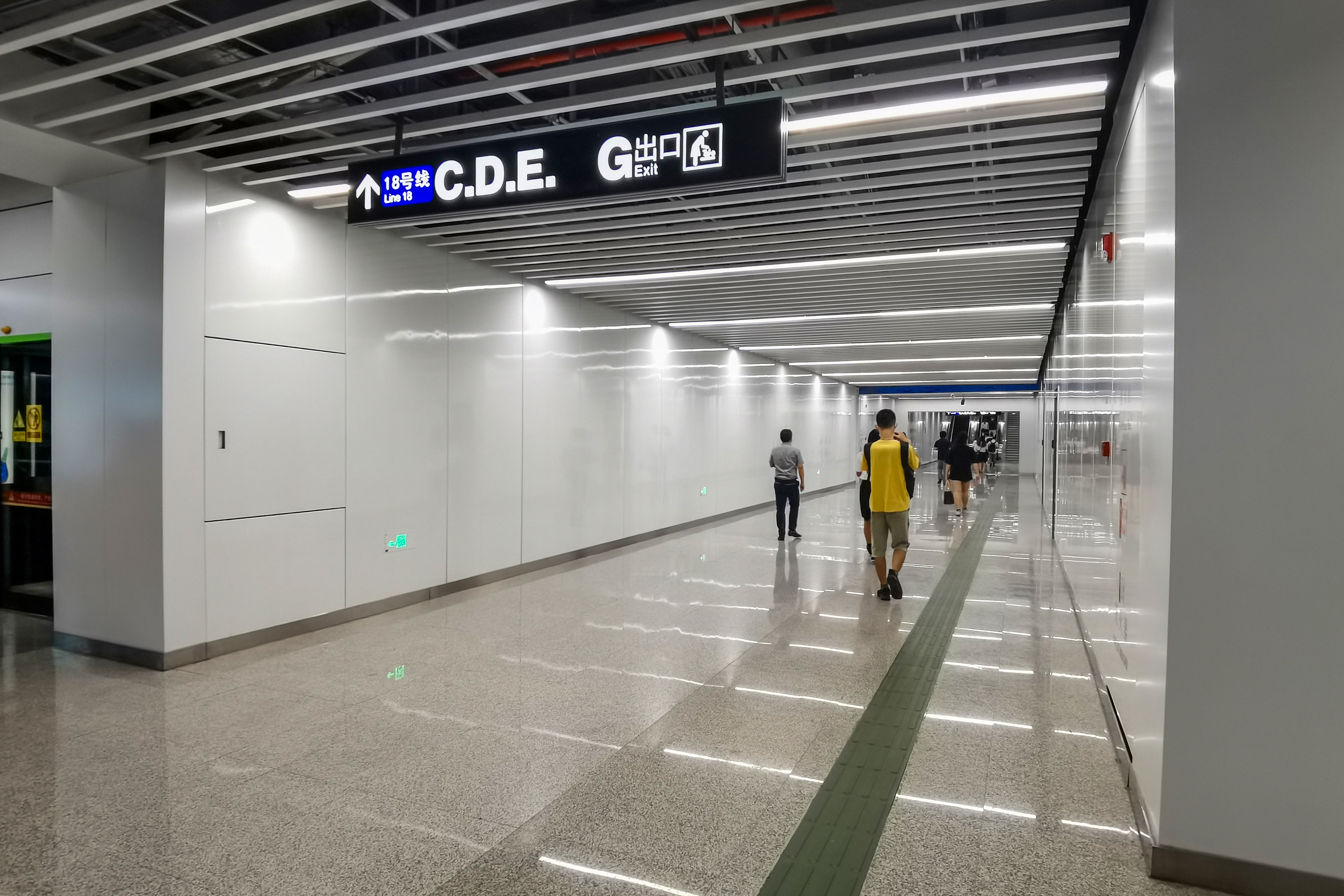
Line 7 western transfer node

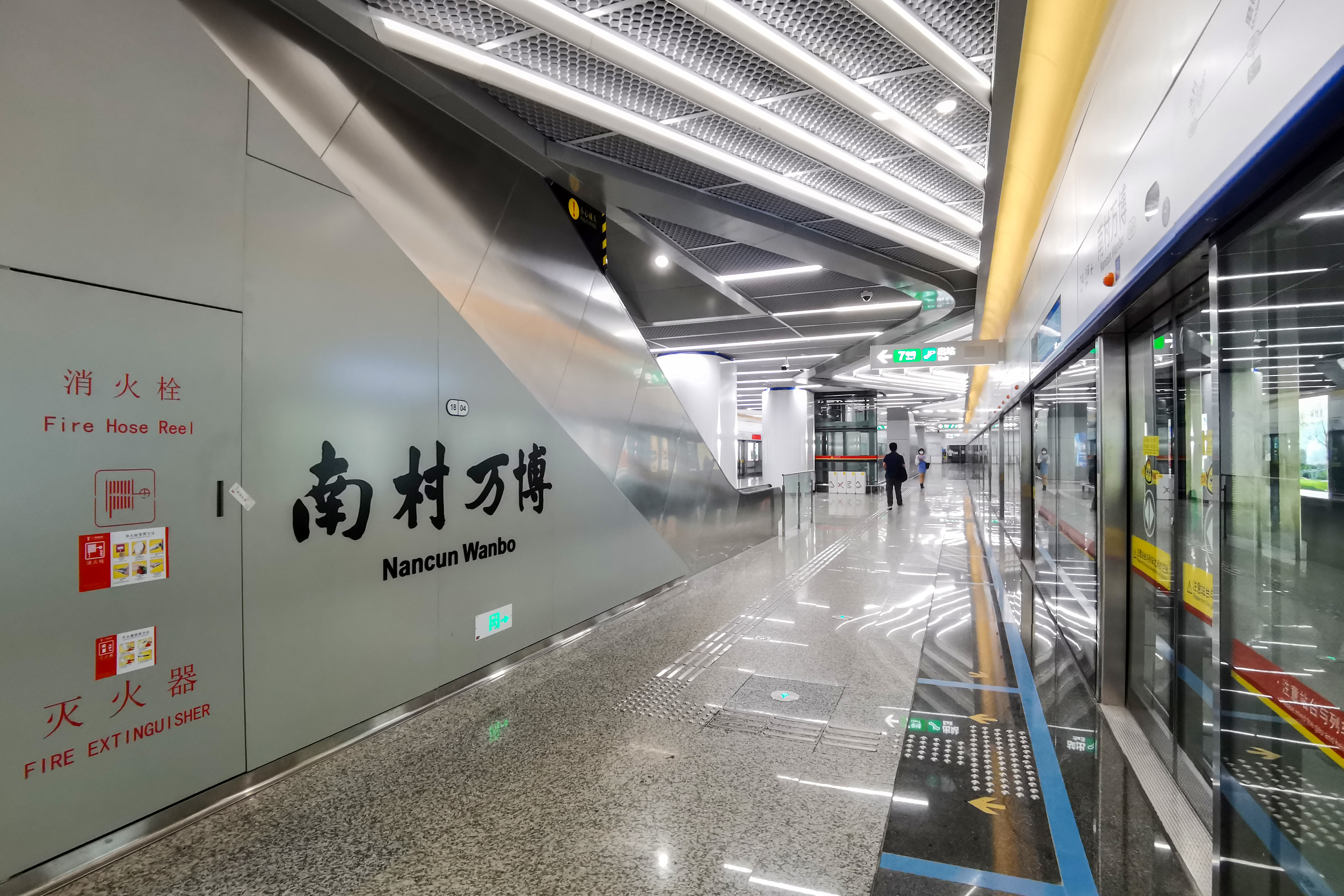
Platform 3 (Line 18 northbound platform)

== Neighboring building ==
- Wanbo Center
- Wanda Plaza
