= Baiyun Dongping station =

Metro station in Guangzhou, China

Baiyun Dongping 白云东平
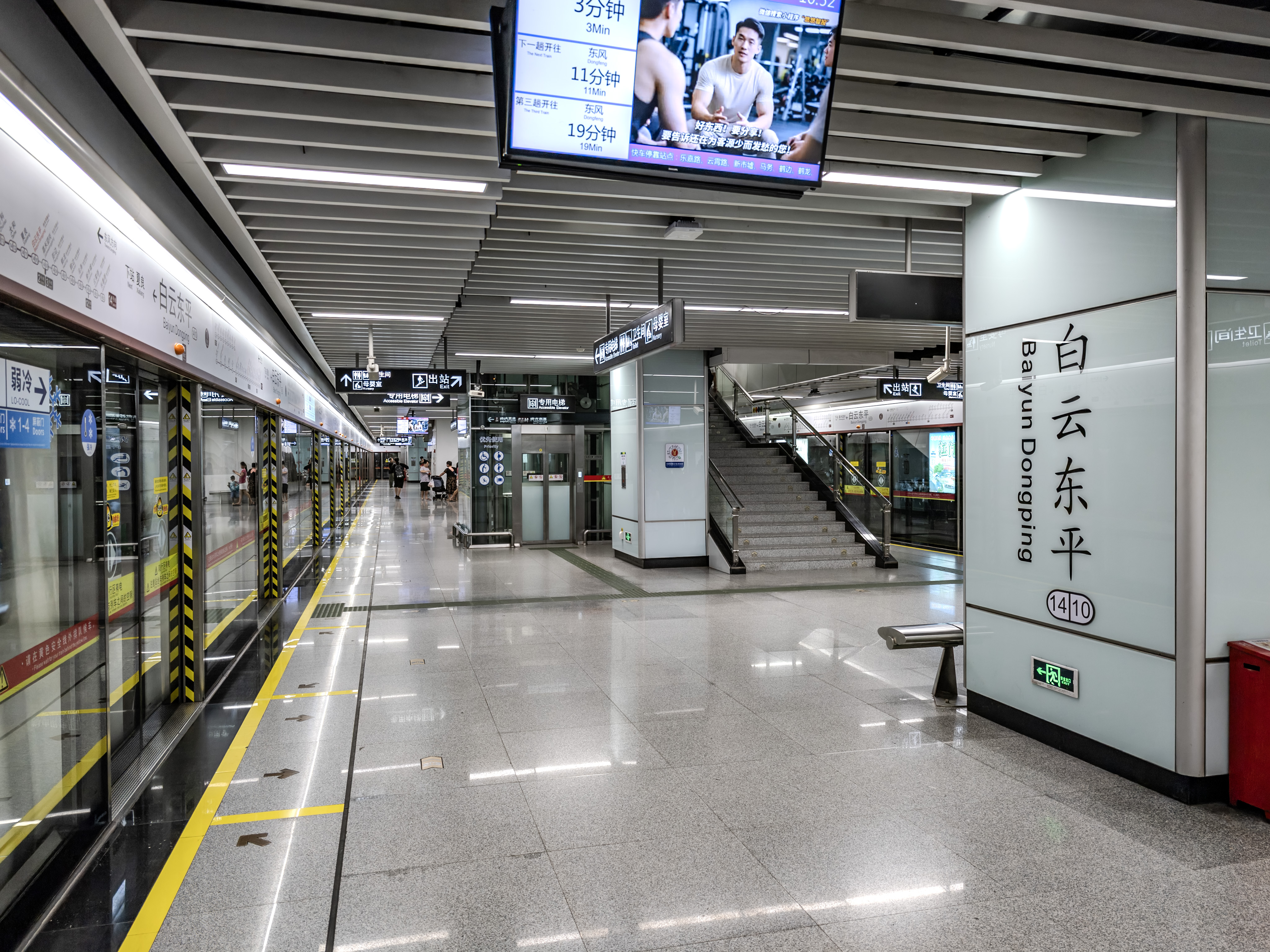
- Platform

Chinese name
- Simplified Chinese: 白云东平站
- Traditional Chinese: 白雲東平站
Transcriptions
Standard Mandarin
- Hanyu Pinyin: Báiyúndōngpíng Zhàn
- Hong Kong Romanization: Bak Wan Tung Ping station

General information
- Location: Guangcong 1st Road (广从一路); Baiyun District, Guangzhou, Guangdong; China
- Operated by: Guangzhou Metro Co. Ltd.
- Line: Line 14
- Platforms: 2 (1 island platform)
- Tracks: 4

Construction
- Structure type: Underground
- Accessible: Yes

Other information
- Station code: 1410

History
- Opened: 28 December 2018; 7 years ago

Services
Preceding station	Guangzhou Metro	Following station
Jiahewanggang towards Lejia Road	Line 14	Xialiang towards Dongfeng
Jiahewanggang towards Lejia Road	Line 14 Express	Zhuliao towards Dongfeng
Future services
Baiyun Urban Center towards Huachengjie	Line 18	Jingxilu towards Wanqingsha
Location

Baiyun Dongping station (Chinese: 白云东平站) is a station of Line 14 of the Guangzhou Metro. It started operations on 28 December 2018.

The station has an underground island platform. Platform 1 is for trains heading to Dongfeng, whilst platform 2 is for trains heading to Lejia Road, along with 2 bypass tracks next to the stopping tracks, separated by a wall.

== Exits ==
There are 4 exits, lettered A, B, E and F. Exit A is accessible. All exits are located on Guangcong 1st Road.

== Gallery ==
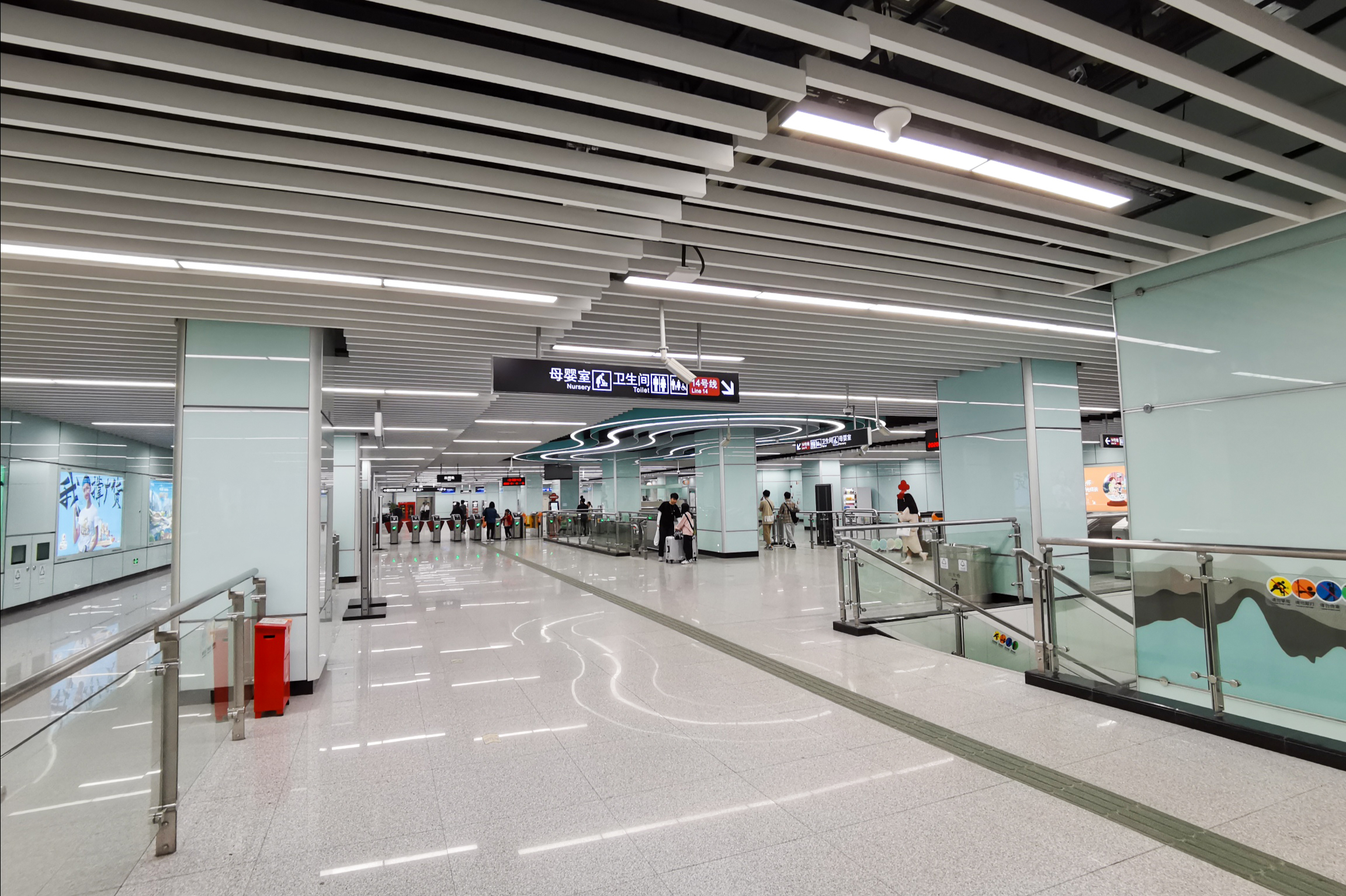
Concourse

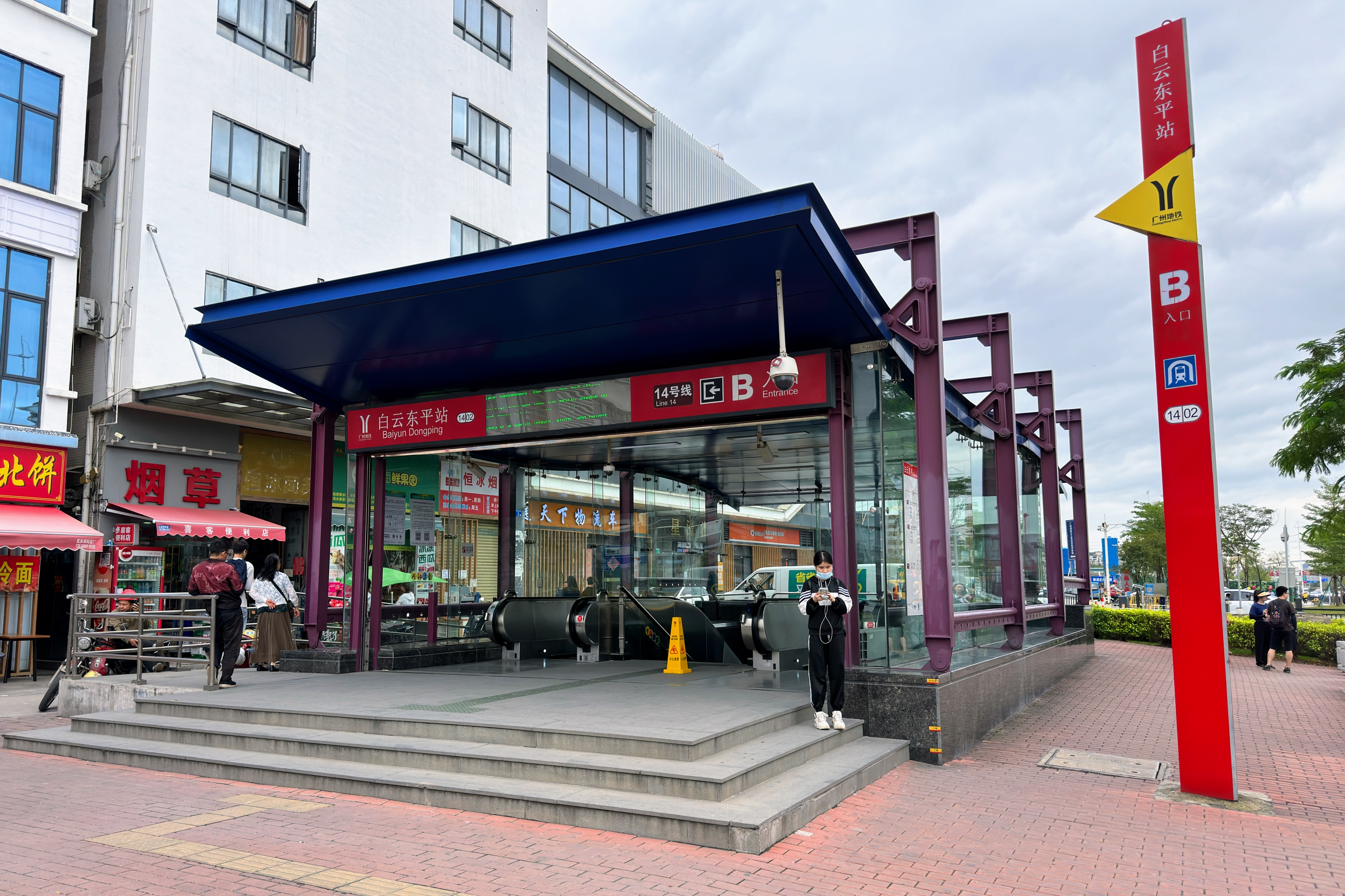
Entrance B

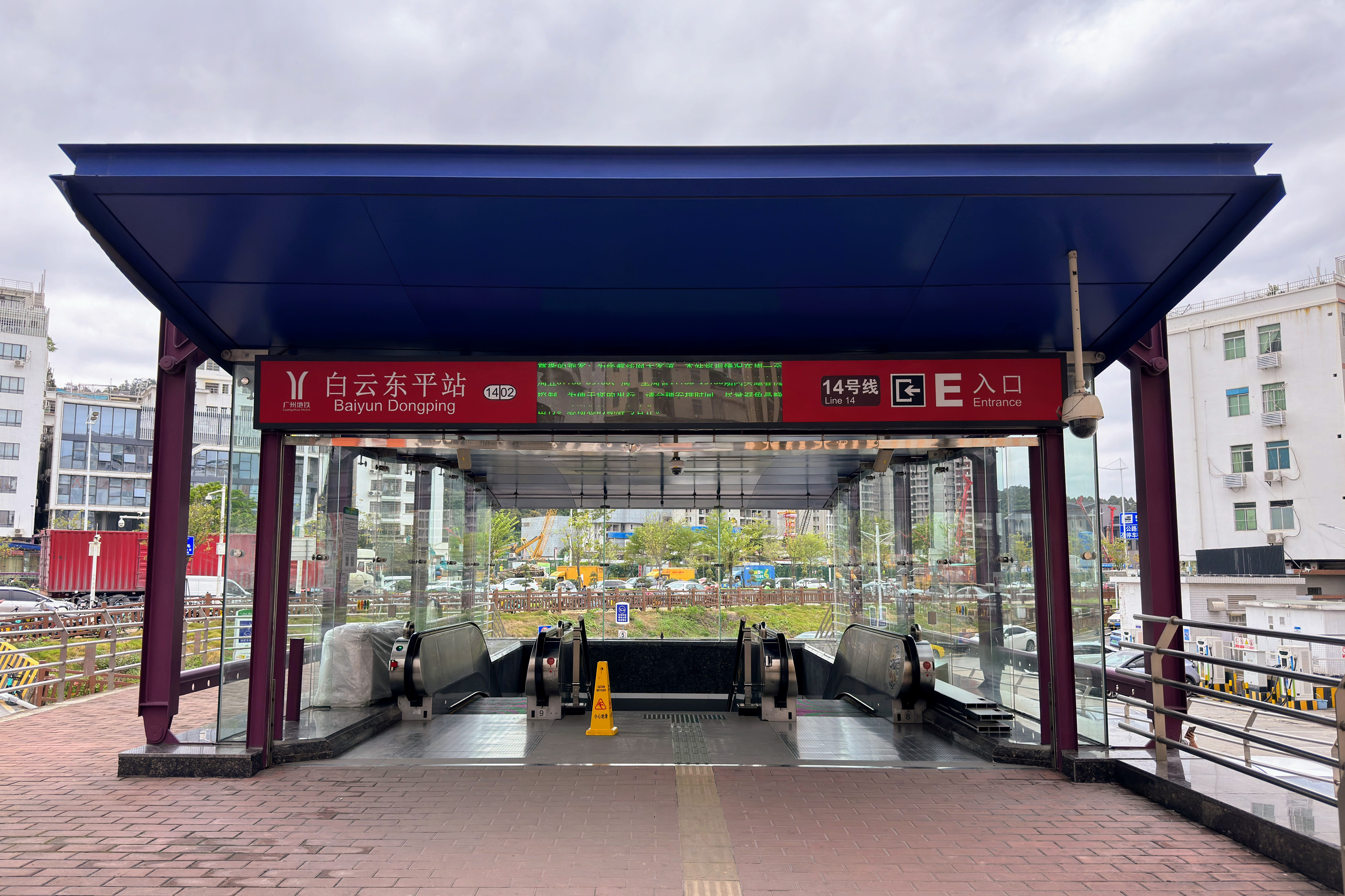
Entrance E

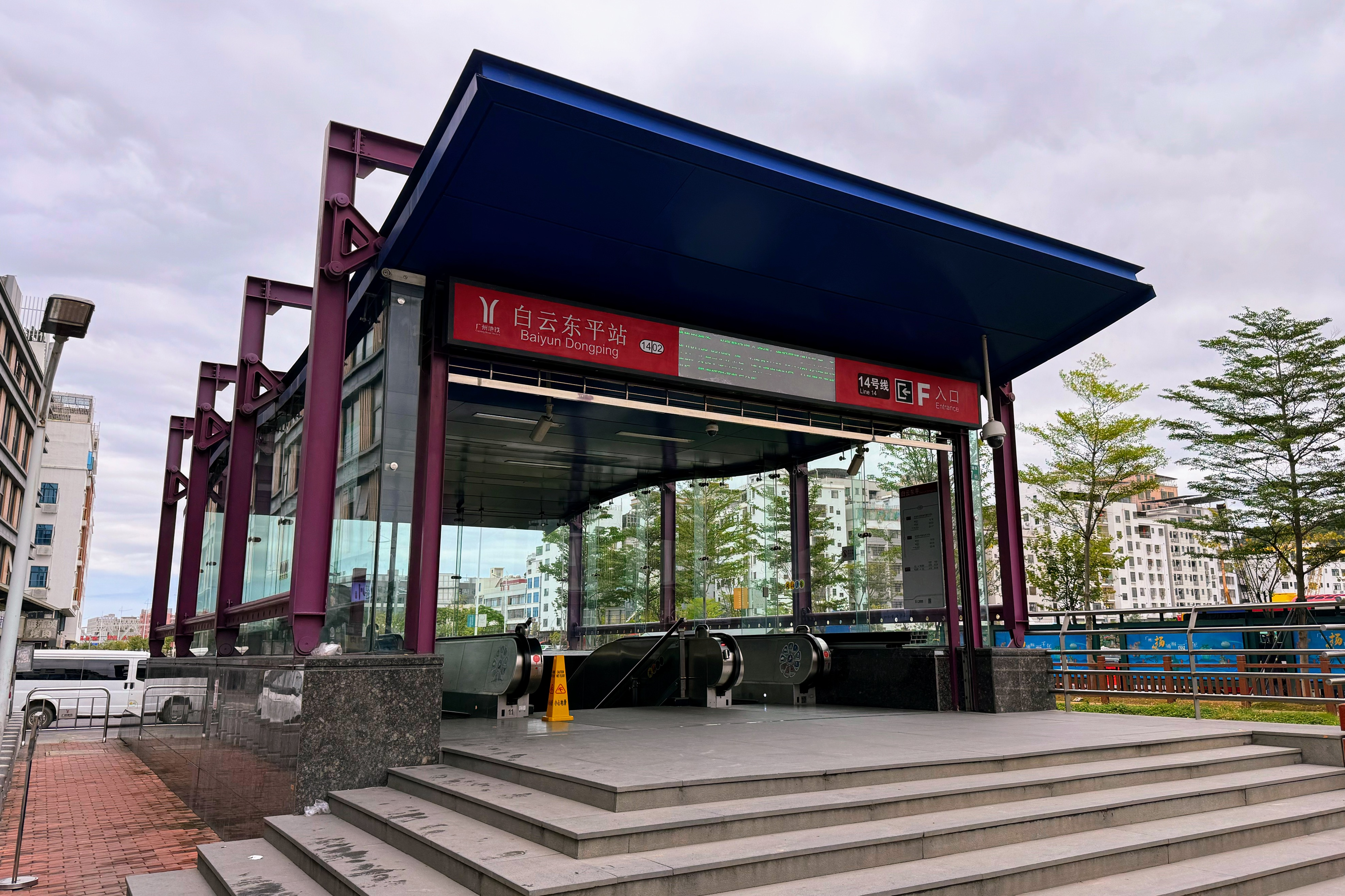
Entrance F
