= Hengli station =

Guangzhou Metro station

Hengli 横沥
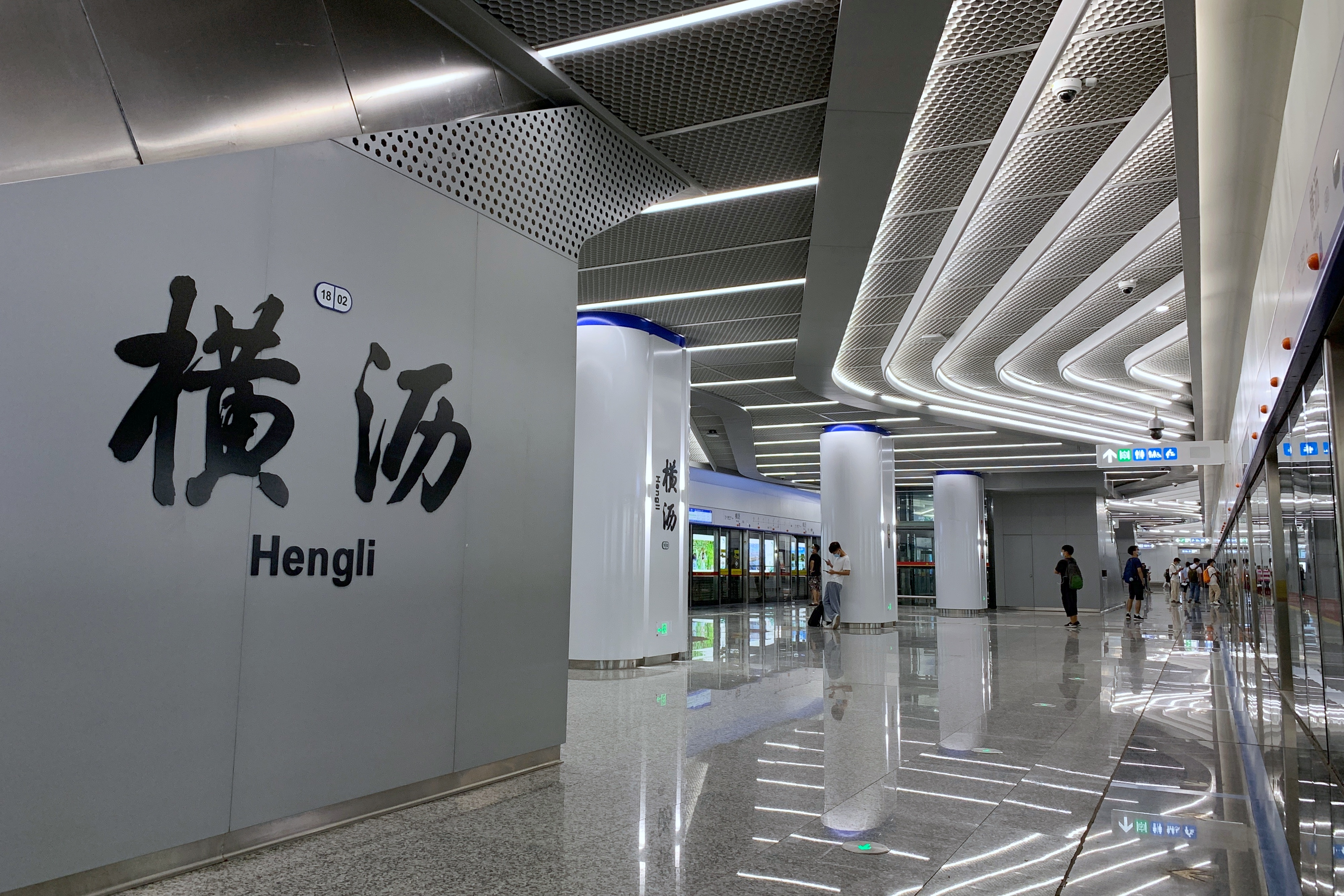
- Platform

Chinese name
- Simplified Chinese: 横沥站
- Traditional Chinese: 橫瀝站
Transcriptions
Standard Mandarin
- Hanyu Pinyin: Hénglì Zhàn
Yue: Cantonese
- Jyutping: waang^{4}lik^{1} zaam^{6}

General information
- Location: West side of Fenghuang Dadao, Hengli Island, Nansha District, Guangzhou, Guangdong; China
- Coordinates: 22.756208°N 113.506311°E
- Operated by: Guangzhou Metro Co. Ltd.
- Line: Line 18
- Platforms: 2 (1 island platform)
- Tracks: 2

Construction
- Structure type: Underground
- Accessible: Yes

Other information
- Station code: 1802

History
- Opened: 28 September 2021; 4 years ago

Services
Preceding station	Guangzhou Metro	Following station
Panyu Square towards Xiancun	Line 18	Wanqingsha Terminus
Location

Hengli Station (simplified Chinese: 横沥站; traditional Chinese: 橫瀝站; pinyin: Hénglì Zhàn; Jyutping: waang^{4}lik^{1} zaam^{6}) is a station on Line 18 of the Guangzhou Metro, located underground at the west side of Fenghuang Dadao on Hengli Island in Guangzhou's Nansha District. It opened on 28 September 2021.

== History ==
On 27 April 2017, construction of this station officially started. On 23 October 2018, the station completed the pouring of the first base plate. On 6 January 2019, the main structure of the shield starting section at the north end of the station was capped. In December 2019, the main structure of the station was capped.

The station was handed over to the '3 Powers' on 12 July 2021 for territorial management and operation of the station and facilities.

== Station information ==
G	Street level	Exits A, D, E
L1; Mezzanine	Buffer Level	Link to exits and concourse
L2; Concourse	Lobby	Ticket Machines, Customer Service, Shops, Police Station, Safety Facilities
L3; Platforms	Platform 1	18 towards Xiancun (Panyu Square)
L3; Platforms	Island platform, doors will open on the left
L3; Platforms	Platform 2	18 towards Wanqingsha (Terminus)

Exit number	Exit location
Exit A	Fenghuang Dadao
Exit D	Fenghuang Dadao
Exit E	Fenghuang Dadao

== Gallery ==
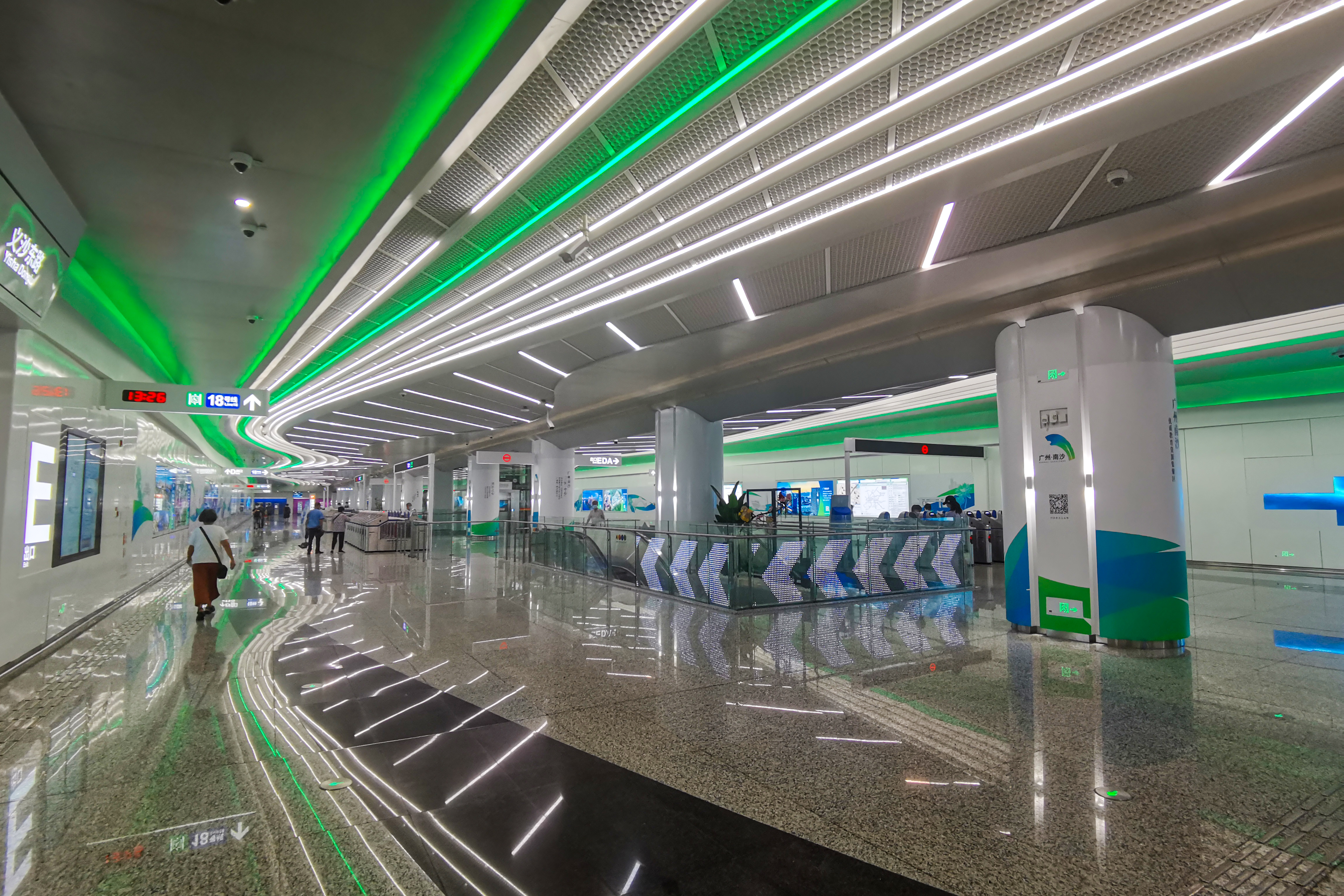
Concourse

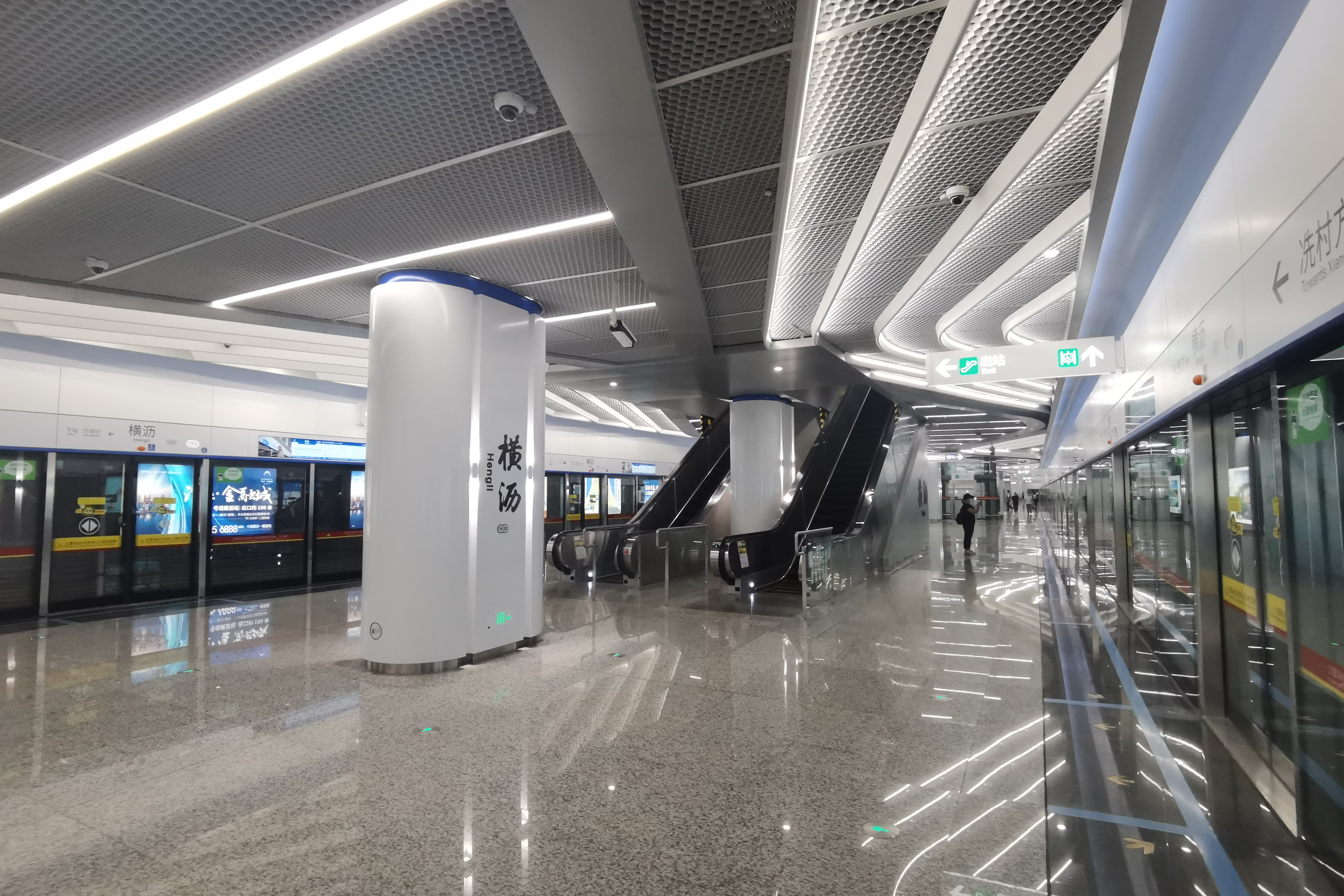
Alternate platform view
