= Nansha railway station =

Railway station in Nansha, Guangzhou, Guangdong

Nansha 南沙
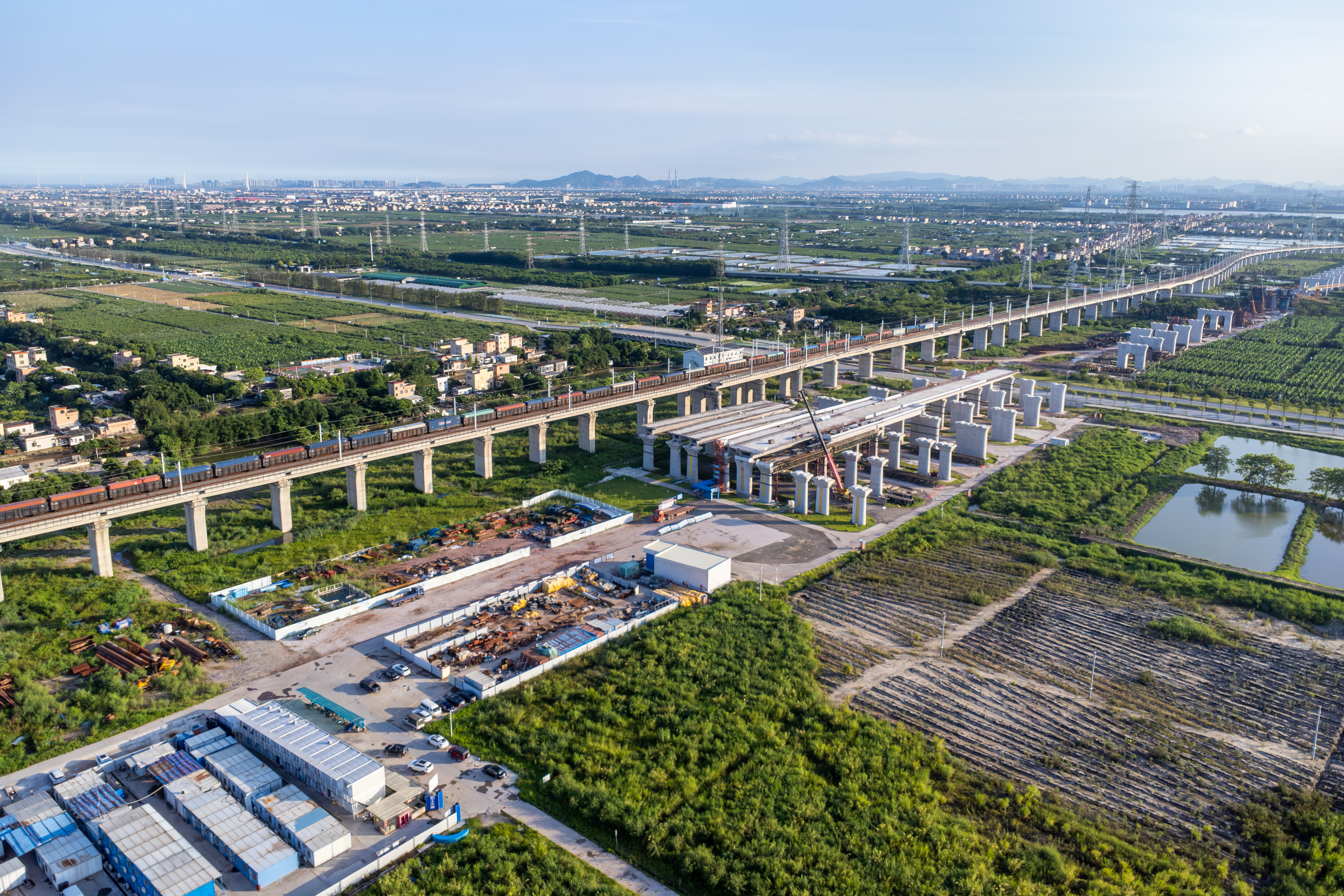
- Construction site (September 2024)

General information
- Location: Nansha District, Guangzhou, Guangdong Province; China
- Coordinates: 22°42′0.93″N 113°33′11.39″E
- Lines: Nansha Port railway (under construction); Shenzhen–Zhanjiang high-speed railway (under construction); Guangzhou–Macao high-speed railway (planned); Zhaoqing–Nansha intercity railway (planned)
Location

Nansha railway station (Chinese: 南沙站) is a railway station currently under construction in Nansha District, Guangzhou, Guangdong Province, China.

== History ==
Two railways currently under construction, the Nansha Port railway, and the Shenzhen–Zhanjiang high-speed railway, will pass through this station.

=== Nansha Port railway ===
Nansha railway station on Nansha Port railway started construction in March 2021. All trains will pass through this station without stopping when the Nansha Port railway opens in late 2021.

== Future Development ==
A further two planned railways, the Guangzhou–Macao high-speed railway, and the Zhaoqing–Nansha intercity railway, will also serve this station.

== Metro station ==
Interchanges with Guangzhou Metro Line 15 (in long-term planning) and Line 18 (opened on September 26, 2021) are planned via Wanqingsha station.
