= Line 18 (Guangzhou Metro) =

Railway line in Guangzhou, China

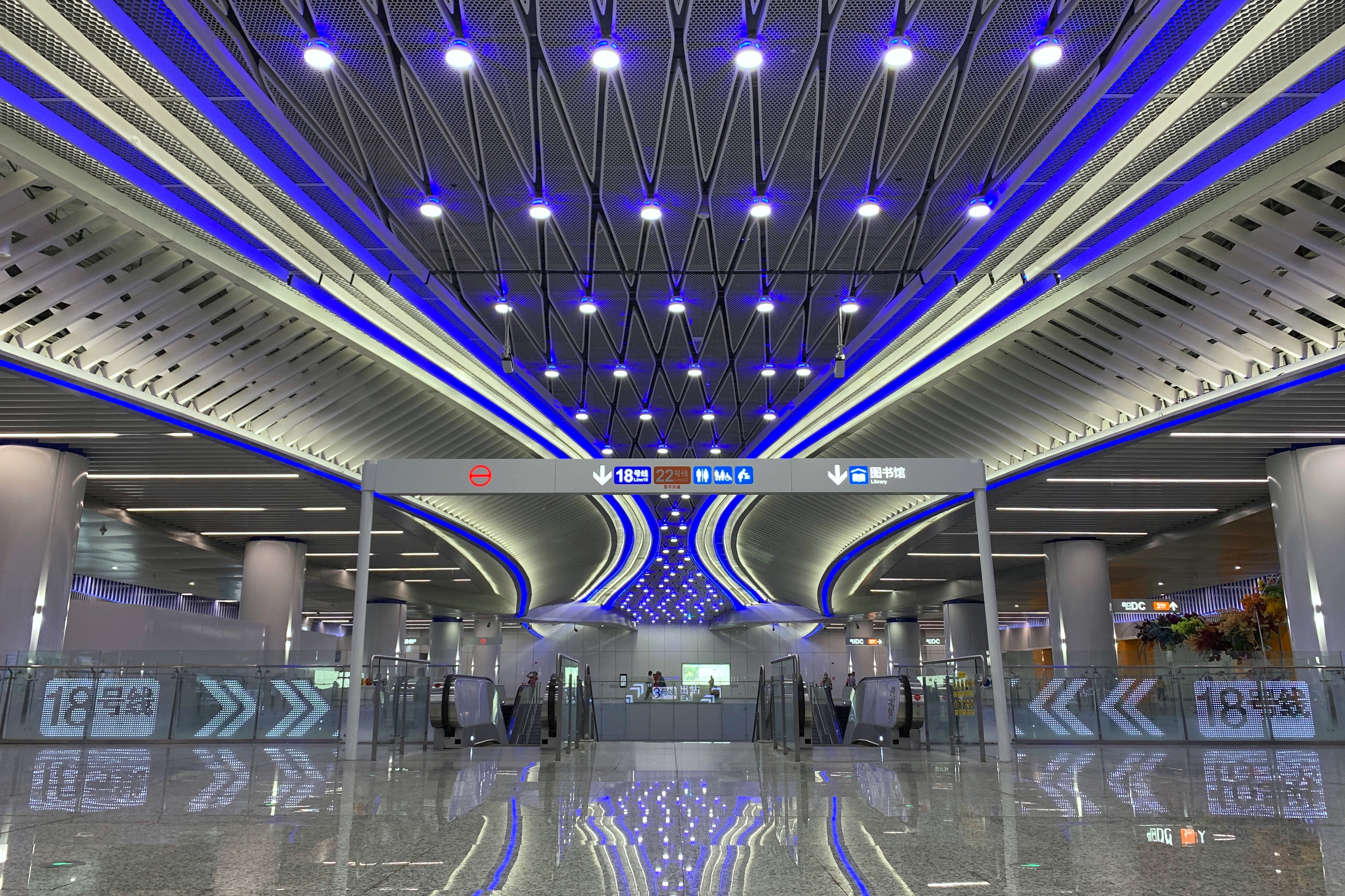
- Concourse of Panyu Square Station

Overview
- Other name(s): North-South express line (Chinese: 南北快线); Nansha express line (Chinese: 南沙快线)
- Status: Operational; extensions under construction
- Owner: City of Guangzhou
- Locale: Huadu, Baiyun, Tianhe, Haizhu, Panyu and Nansha districts, Guangzhou, Guangdong; Zhongshan (under construction)
- Termini: Wanqingsha; Xiancun
- Stations: 8 operational 1 under construction in Phase 1; 7 under construction on the north extension

Service
- Type: Rapid transit
- System: Guangzhou Metro
- Services: 2 (express and local)
- Operator(s): Guangdong Intercity (wholly owned by Guangzhou Metro Corporation)
- Depot(s): Wanqingsha depot; Longzhen stabling yard
- Rolling stock: 8-car Type D urban express trains
- Daily ridership: 141,300 (2025 daily average)

History
- Opened: 28 September 2021; 5 years ago (Wanqingsha-Xiancun)

Technical
- Line length: 58.3 km (36.2 mi) operational 61.3 km (38.1 mi) full Phase 1; 39.6 km (24.6 mi) north extension
- Character: Underground
- Track gauge: 1,435 mm (4 ft 8 1/2 in)
- Electrification: 25 kV 50 Hz AC overhead catenary
- Operating speed: 160 km/h (100 mph)
- Signalling: High-speed CBTC; GoA3 automatic operation

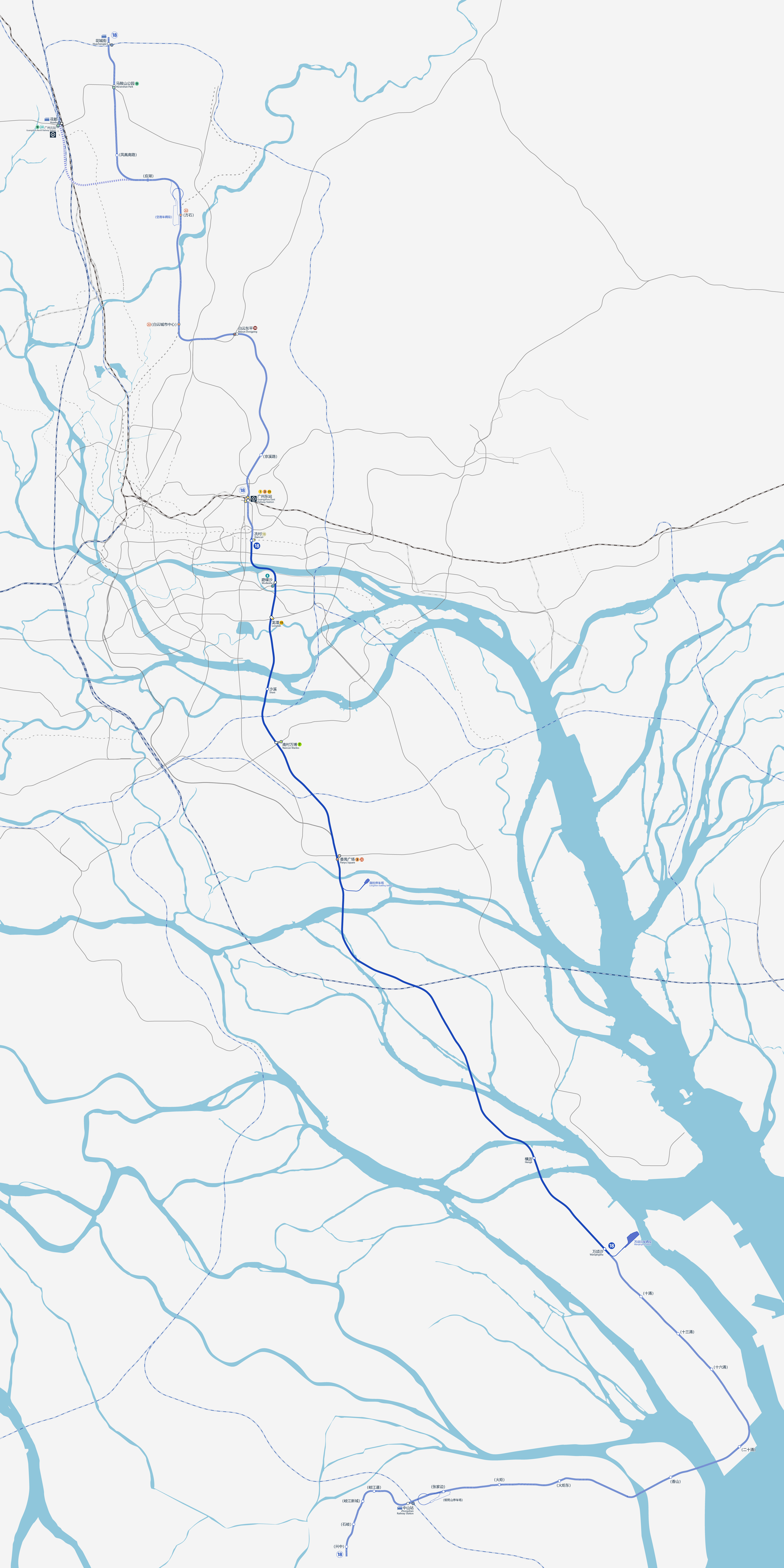
Line 18 drawn to scale.

Line 18 of the Guangzhou Metro (Chinese: 广州地铁18号线; pinyin: Guǎngzhōu Dìtiě Shíbāhàoxiàn) is a north-south express rapid transit line in Guangzhou, Guangdong, China. It is one of the high-speed metro lines in Guangzhou's rapid-transit network and operates at up to 160 km/h (99 mph).

The opened section runs from Wanqingsha in Nansha District to Xiancun in Tianhe District, via Panyu District, Haizhu District and Zhujiang New Town. It opened on 28 September 2021. The remaining Phase 1 section from Xiancun to Guangzhou East Railway Station is under construction, while northern and southern extensions are being developed as intercity-style projects toward Huadu, Zhongshan and Zhuhai.

Line 18 uses all-stop and express stopping patterns. Express trains currently serve Xiancun, Modiesha, Nancun Wanbo, Panyu Square, Hengli and Wanqingsha, with a typical end-to-end express journey of about 35 minutes.

== Overview ==
Line 18 was designed as Guangzhou's first opened high-speed metro line in a three-tier urban rail network of high-speed, express and ordinary metro services. Phase 1 is 61.3 km (38.1 mi) long and entirely underground. It was planned with nine stations, eight of which are interchange stations. The opened Wanqingsha-Xiancun section is 58.3 km (36.2 mi) long and has eight stations.

The line has unusually long station spacing for a metro service. The longest interval in Phase 1 is the 26.0 km (16.2 mi) section between Hengli and Panyu Square. Two emergency evacuation and rescue platforms were built in this interval; the one near Xili Village was reported to have the physical conditions for possible later conversion into a station, although Guangzhou Metro later said such conversion could not be carried out under existing operating and construction constraints.

== History ==
=== Planning ===
Early plans for the corridor were different from the route eventually built. In 2003, a planned Line 13 corridor linked Dagang and Nansha, later becoming Line 18, or the "Dagang line". Subsequent schemes extended the line toward Panyu and Guangzhou South railway station before the route was reorganised with the former Line 22 concept.

The finalised Line 18 alignment was promoted as a rapid link between the Nansha Free Trade Zone and central Guangzhou, and as a way to divert some demand from Line 3. The route was revised to pass more deeply through Zhujiang New Town along Xiancun Road, while the southern section was moved to follow Panyu Avenue instead of the earlier Lanhe-Dagang corridor. Line 18 and Line 22 had originally been longer-term projects, but were brought forward to support Nansha's development.

=== Construction and opening ===
The feasibility study report for Phase 1 was approved by the Guangdong Provincial Development and Reform Commission on 14 August 2017. The first large shield machine for Lines 18 and 22 began tunnelling on 29 August 2018. The first operating section, from Wanqingsha to Xiancun, opened at 14:00 on 28 September 2021.

The short remaining Phase 1 section from Xiancun to Guangzhou East has been delayed by the reconstruction of the national railway station at Guangzhou East. As of the end of May 2026, civil works on this section were reported to be 57 percent complete; the shield-bored part of the Guangzhou East-Xiancun interval had been completed, while mined sections and the southern approach works at Guangzhou East were still under construction.

On 20 July 2022, Guangdong Intercity and Nansha Port Logistics tested freight carriage on Line 18. A compartment of the first pre-service test train of the day was used as a logistics compartment to move small parcels from Xiancun to Wanqingsha.

== Service patterns ==
Line 18 is operated with both all-stop and express services. All-stop trains call at every open station between Xiancun and Wanqingsha. Express trains call at Xiancun, Modiesha, Nancun Wanbo, Panyu Square, Hengli and Wanqingsha, with a typical headway of about 20 to 40 minutes. The express end-to-end running time is about 35 minutes.

When the line opened, express trains skipped Longtan and Shaxi and stopped at Hengli, Panyu Square, Nancun Wanbo and Modiesha only after later service changes. Modiesha was added as an express stop on 28 September 2022, and Nancun Wanbo was added from 28 September 2024.

For large events near southern Wanqingsha, such as concerts at the Greater Bay Area Cultural and Sports Centre, the line may run later Xiancun-bound services and additional express trains with event-specific boarding restrictions.

== Opening timeline ==
Segment	Commencement	Length	Stations	Section
Xiancun - Wanqingsha	28 September 2021	58.3 km (36.2 mi)	8	Phase 1
Guangzhou East railway station - Xiancun	TBA (under construction)	3.0 km (1.9 mi)	1	Phase 1
Huachengjie - Guangzhou East railway station	TBA (under construction)	39.6 km (24.6 mi)	7	North extension
Wanqingsha - Xingzhong	TBA (under construction)	about 47.6 km (29.6 mi)	10, plus reserved stations	South-western extension

== Stations ==
Legend

- Opened on 28 September 2021
- Under construction or reserved

Section	Station No.	Express	Regular	Station name		Connections	Future connections	Location
Section	Station No.	Express	Regular	English	Chinese	Connections	Future connections	Location
North ext.				Huachengjie	花城街	HCA ER		Huadu
North ext.				Ma'anshan Park	马鞍山公园	9 905		Huadu
North ext.				Fenghuangnanlu	凤凰南路			Huadu
North ext.				Fangshi	方石		22 2214	Baiyun
North ext.				Baiyun Urban Center	白云城市中心		22 2213	Baiyun
North ext.				Baiyun Dongping	白云东平	14 1410		Baiyun
North ext.				Jingxilu	京溪路			Baiyun
Phase 1	1809			Guangzhou East Railway Station	广州东站	1 116 3 318 11 1108; GGQ		Tianhe
Phase 1	1808	●	●	Xiancun	冼村		13 1316	Tianhe
Phase 1	1807	●	●	Modiesha	磨碟沙	8 825		Haizhu
Phase 1	1806	｜	●	Longtan	龙潭	11 1131		Haizhu
Phase 1	1805	｜	●	Shaxi	沙溪			Panyu
Phase 1	1804	●	●	Nancun Wanbo	南村万博	7 706		Panyu
Phase 1	1803	●	●	Panyu Square	番禺广场	3 301 22 2201		Panyu
Phase 1	1802	●	●	Hengli	横沥			Nansha
Phase 1	1801	●	●	Wanqingsha	万顷沙	Nansha railway station	15	Nansha

=== South-western extension ===
Section	Station name		Connections	Location	City
Section	English	Chinese	Connections	Location	City
South-western ext.	Shichong (reserved station)	十涌		Nansha	Guangzhou
South-western ext.	Shisanchong	十三涌		Nansha	Guangzhou
South-western ext.	Ershichong	二十涌		Nansha	Guangzhou
South-western ext.	Xiangshan	香山		Nanlang	Zhongshan
South-western ext.	Huoju East (reserved station)	火炬东		Zhongshangang; Subdistrict	Zhongshan
South-western ext.	Huoju	火炬		Zhongshangang; Subdistrict	Zhongshan
South-western ext.	Huoju West	火炬西		Zhongshangang; Subdistrict	Zhongshan
South-western ext.	Zhongshan	中山	ZSQ	Zhongshangang; Subdistrict	Zhongshan
South-western ext.	Qijiangdao	岐江道		Dongqu Subdistrict	Zhongshan
South-western ext.	Qijiang New Town (reserved station)	岐江新城		Shiqi Subdistrict	Zhongshan
South-western ext.	Shiqi	石岐		Shiqi Subdistrict	Zhongshan
South-western ext.	Xingzhong	兴中		Dongqu Subdistrict	Zhongshan

== Rolling stock and signalling ==
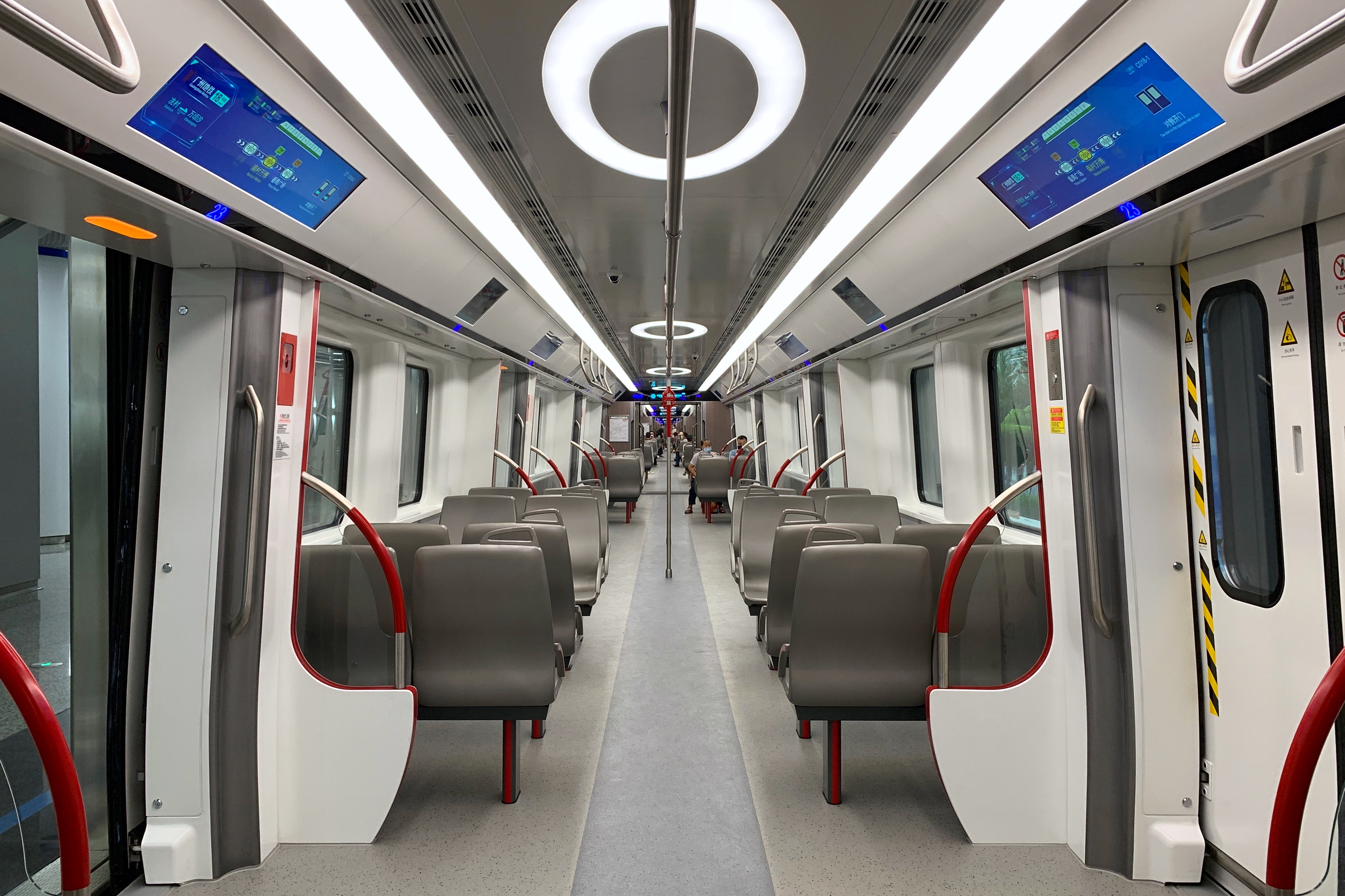
Train interior

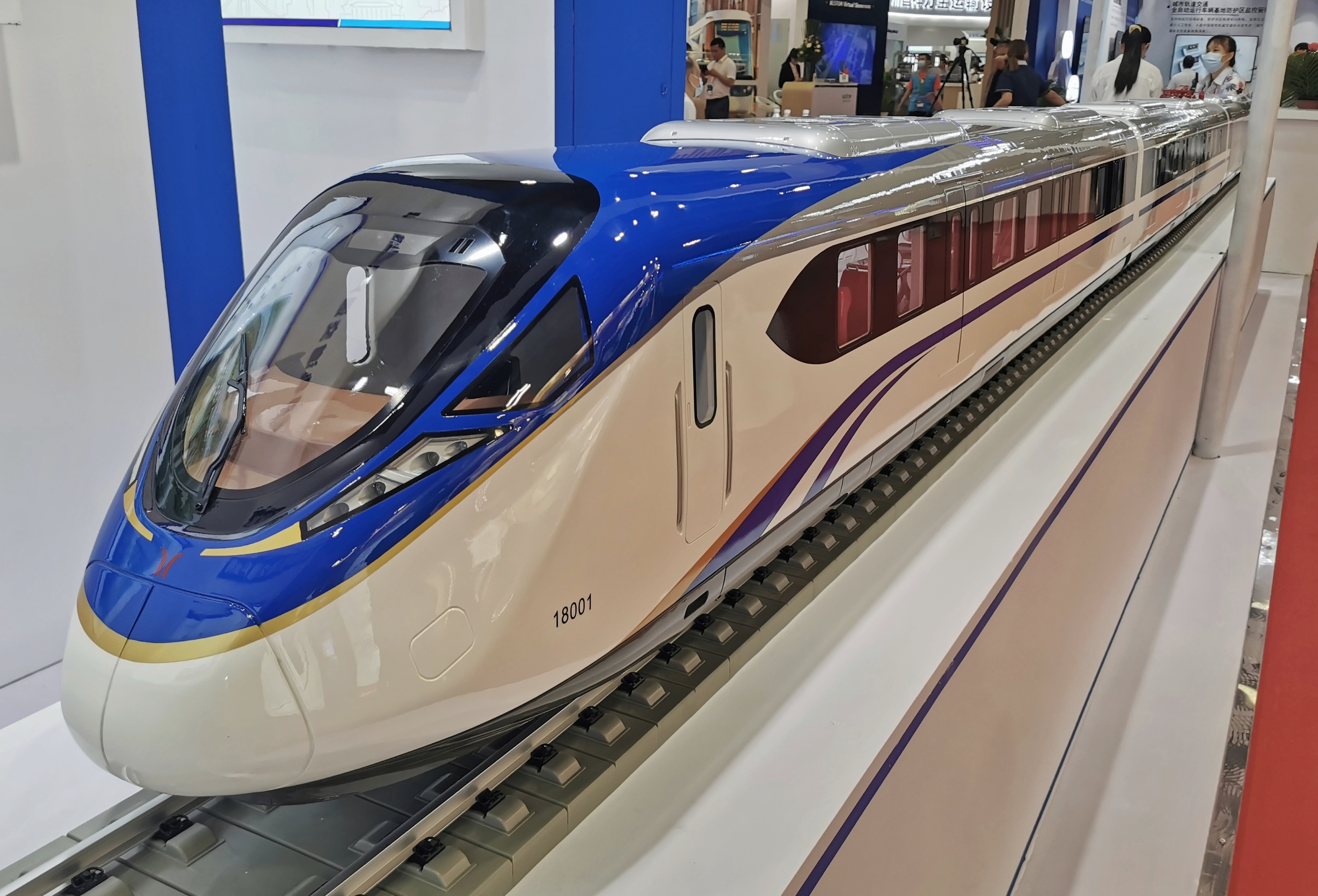
Model of D1 train

Line 18 uses 8-car Type D urban express trains with a maximum operating speed of 160 km/h (99 mph), making it one of the fastest metro services in mainland China. It was also reported as the first line in China to use a high-speed-grade CBTC signalling system.

The trains are manufactured by CRRC Zhuzhou Locomotive. The first train was officially delivered on 25 September 2020, and 15 trains were initially placed into operation when the line opened. Line 18 services may also use Line 22 trainsets in mixed operation.

GoA3 automatic train operation was activated on 7 January 2023, making Line 18 Guangzhou Metro's second GoA3 line. Some trains include business-class soft seats in the end cars; Guangzhou Metro has stated that differentiated fares may be introduced in future.

== Ridership and planning issues ==
During the environmental review in 2017, some residents and commentators asked for additional stations, including one near Tianhe Sports Center to interchange with Line 1, and another at Yuwotou. Guangzhou planning authorities rejected these proposals, saying that the line needed wide station spacing to meet the target of a fast Nansha-central Guangzhou journey. The limited number of stations reduced the line's ability to relieve Line 3, and the planned Line 26 along Guangzhou Avenue was later proposed as a further relief route.

Initial ridership was lower than expected. The Wanqingsha and Hengli areas of Nansha were still lightly developed when the first section opened, and the line did not yet interchange with other metro lines in Tianhe. From opening in September 2021 to the end of that year, average daily ridership was 75,600 passengers. Ridership later grew as commuting demand around Hengli and nearby areas increased. In 2025, average daily ridership reached 141,300 passengers, up nearly 24 percent year on year, the highest growth rate in the Guangzhou Metro network that year.

== Future development ==
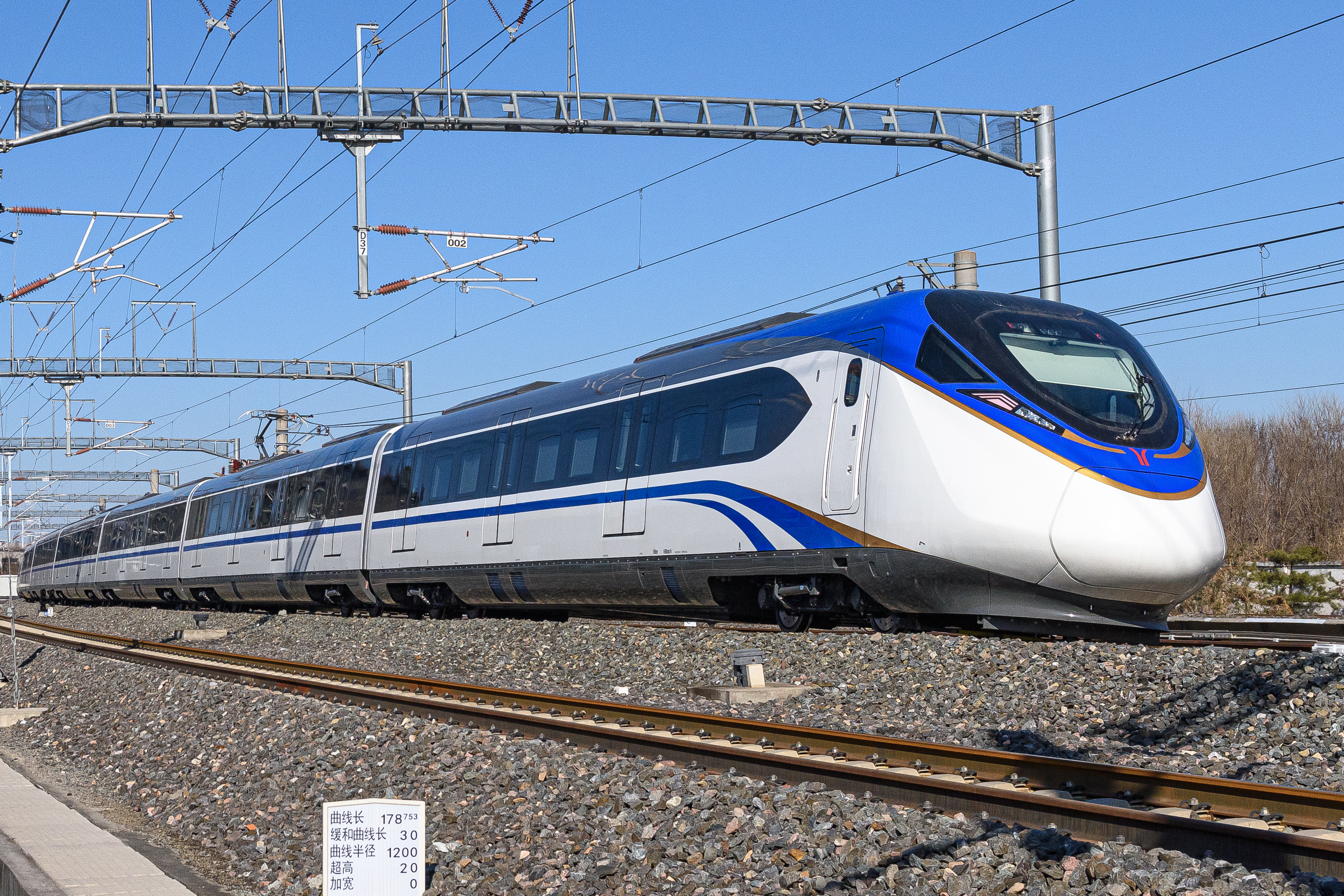
A prototype SRC160CZ suburban EMU with both CTCS and CBTC signalling equipment under test at the China Academy of Railway Sciences test track in Beijing

Line 18 is planned to extend north and south as part of the Guangdong-Hong Kong-Macau Greater Bay Area intercity railway programme.

=== North extension ===
The northern extension, also known as the Guangzhou East-Huadu Tiangui intercity railway (Chinese: 广州东至花都天贵城际) or Guanghua intercity railway (Chinese: 广花城际), was approved in August 2020. It runs from Guangzhou East railway station to Huachengjie in Huadu District, adding seven stations: Jingxilu, Baiyun Dongping, Baiyun Urban Center, Fangshi, Fenghuangnanlu, Ma'anshan Park and Huachengjie. The extension is 39.6 km (24.6 mi) long and fully underground.

Construction began on 28 September 2021. In January 2026, Jingxilu station topped out, meaning all seven stations on the north extension had completed their main structures. As of April 2026, civil works were reported to be 63 percent complete; all stations had topped out, one interval had been completed, and 18 shield machines were tunnelling on the remaining intervals.

The north extension includes provision for cross-line operation with the north extension of Line 22, which could allow Line 18 trains to run toward Guangzhou Baiyun International Airport. A planned connecting line via Huadu railway station would also allow through operation with the Guangzhou-Qingyuan intercity railway.

Further northward extension toward Qingyuan has been studied, but later planning became more uncertain after tighter national requirements for intercity railway construction. Huadu District has more recently proposed an extension to Shiling in future Greater Bay Area intercity planning revisions.

=== South extension ===
The southern extension was approved in August 2020 under the project name Nansha-Zhuhai (Zhongshan) intercity railway (Chinese: 南沙至珠海（中山）城际), also known as the Nanzhongzhu intercity railway (Chinese: 南中珠城际). The approved concept included a main line from Wanqingsha through Zhongshan and Zhuhai toward Gongbei, and a Zhongshan branch.

The first part to advance was the western route to Zhongshan, also known as the Nanzhong intercity railway. Construction on the Wanqingsha-Xingzhong section began on 30 March 2023. The approved western section is about 47.6 km (29.6 mi) long and includes ten stations, with some additional reserved stations. It is intended to support a Guangzhou-Zhongshan express journey of about 45 minutes after opening.

By February 2026, civil works on the Guangzhou section of the south-western extension were reported to be 91 percent complete, with all three Guangzhou stations topped out and all three intervals completed. By April 2026, seven of the nine Zhongshan-section stations had topped out, and several tunnel sections had been completed. Zhongshan's 2026 government work report referred to a target of opening the first section to Xiangshan in 2027.

The eastern route toward Zhuhai has been less settled. Earlier plans considered a route toward Zhuhai North railway station, Gongbei Port and the Hong Kong-Zhuhai-Macau Bridge port area, but later Zhongshan and Zhuhai planning documents continued to revise the scheme. In 2026, local authorities were again reported to be adjusting the project in response to national intercity railway policy requirements.

=== Reserved stations ===
Line 18 has several reserved or potential stations. In Phase 1, the rescue platform near Xili Village between Hengli and Panyu Square has been discussed as a possible long-term station and appears in Guangzhou's long-term network planning as an interchange with the planned Line 33. The 2026 economic development plan for Nansha District proposed starting preliminary work for conversion and opening of that station.

On the north extension, Yinghu junction is planned as a connection point with the Guangzhou-Qingyuan intercity connecting line and appears in long-term planning as an interchange with the planned Line 41. The south-western extension also includes several reserved stations, including Shichong, Huojudong and Qijiang New Town.
