= Xiancun station =

Guangzhou Metro station

Xiancun 冼村
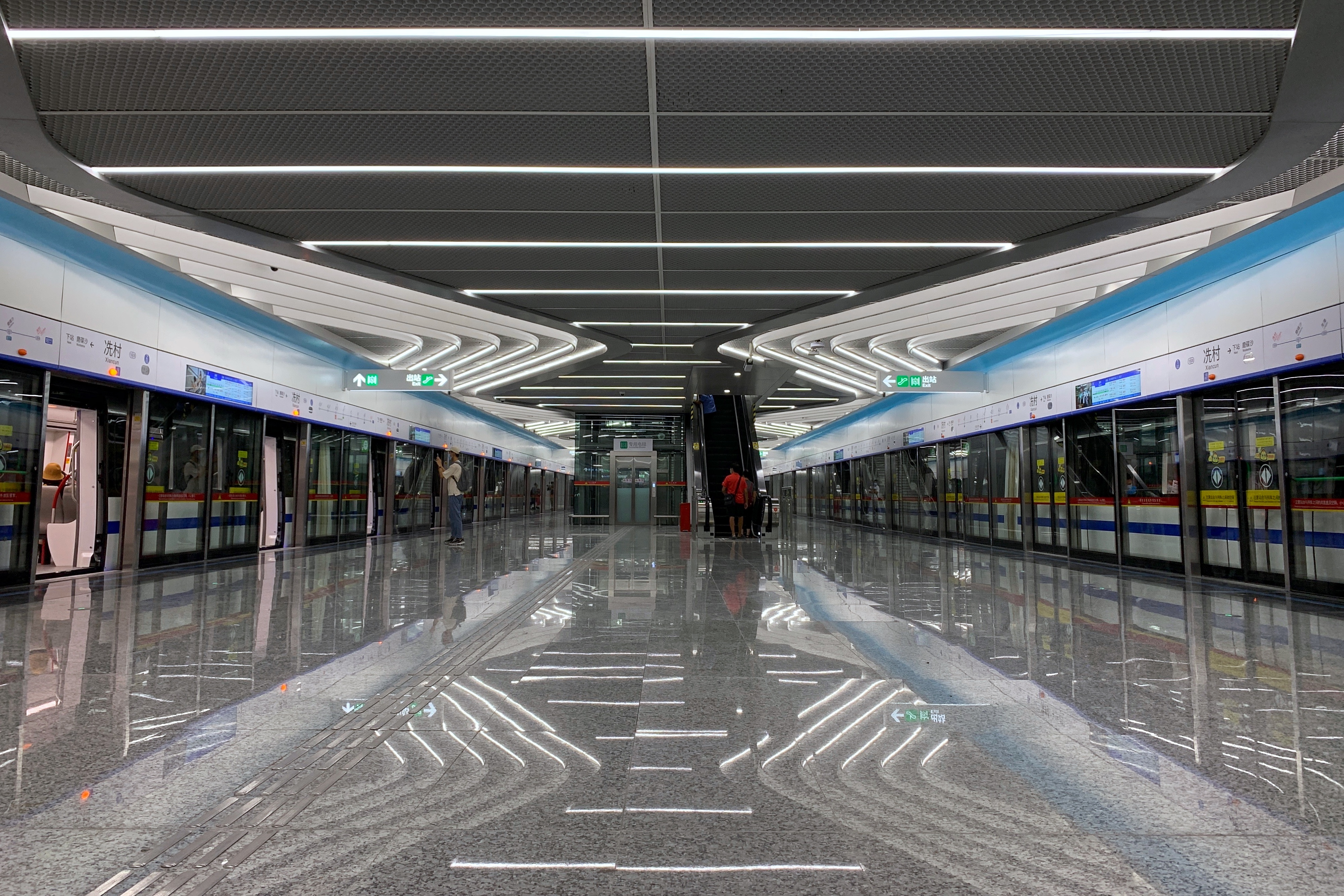
- Platform

Chinese name
- Simplified Chinese: 冼村站
- Traditional Chinese: 冼村站
Transcriptions
Standard Mandarin
- Hanyu Pinyin: Xiǎncūn Zhàn
Yue: Cantonese
- Jyutping: sin^{2}cyun^{4} zaam^{6}
- Hong Kong Romanization: Sin Tsuen station

General information
- Location: Fork of Huangpu Avenue West (黄埔大道西), Tiyu East Road (体育东路) and Xiancun Road (冼村路), Tianhe District, Guangzhou, Guangdong; China
- Coordinates: 23.128308°N 113.322792°E
- Operated by: Guangzhou Metro Co. Ltd.
- Lines: Line 13 (late 2026); Line 18
- Platforms: 2 (1 island platform)
- Tracks: 2

Construction
- Structure type: Underground
- Accessible: Yes

Other information
- Station code: 1808

History
- Opened: 28 September 2021; 4 years ago

Services
Preceding station	Guangzhou Metro	Following station
Terminus	Line 18	Modiesha towards Wanqingsha
Future services
Huacheng Square North towards Chaoyang	Line 13	Shipai South towards Xinsha
Guangzhou East Railway Station towards Huachengjie	Line 18	Modiesha towards Wanqingsha
Location

Xiancun Station (Chinese: 冼村站; pinyin: Xiǎncūn Zhàn; Jyutping: sin^{2}cyun^{4} zaam^{6}) is a station on Line 18 of the Guangzhou Metro, located underground at the fork of Huangpu Avenue West, Tiyu East Road and Xiancun Road in Guangzhou's Tianhe District. It opened on 28 September 2021, and is the current northern terminus of the line.

The station will become an interchange station with Line 13 in late 2026.

== History ==
On 28 November 2020, the main structure of the Line 18 station was capped, and on 31 December of the same year, the concrete pouring of the negative roof of the open cut section of the Line 18 station was completed.

== Station information ==
G	Street level	Exits B, G
L1; Concourse	Lobby	Ticket Machines, Customer Service, Shops, Police Station, Safety Facilities
L2; Mezzanine	Buffer level	Station Equipment
L3; Platforms	Platform 1	18 towards Wanqingsha (Modiesha)
L3; Platforms	Island platform, doors will open on the left, right
L3; Platforms	Platform 2	18 towards Wanqingsha (Modiesha)

Exit number	Exit location
Exit B	Xiancun Road
Exit G	Xiancun Road

== Gallery ==
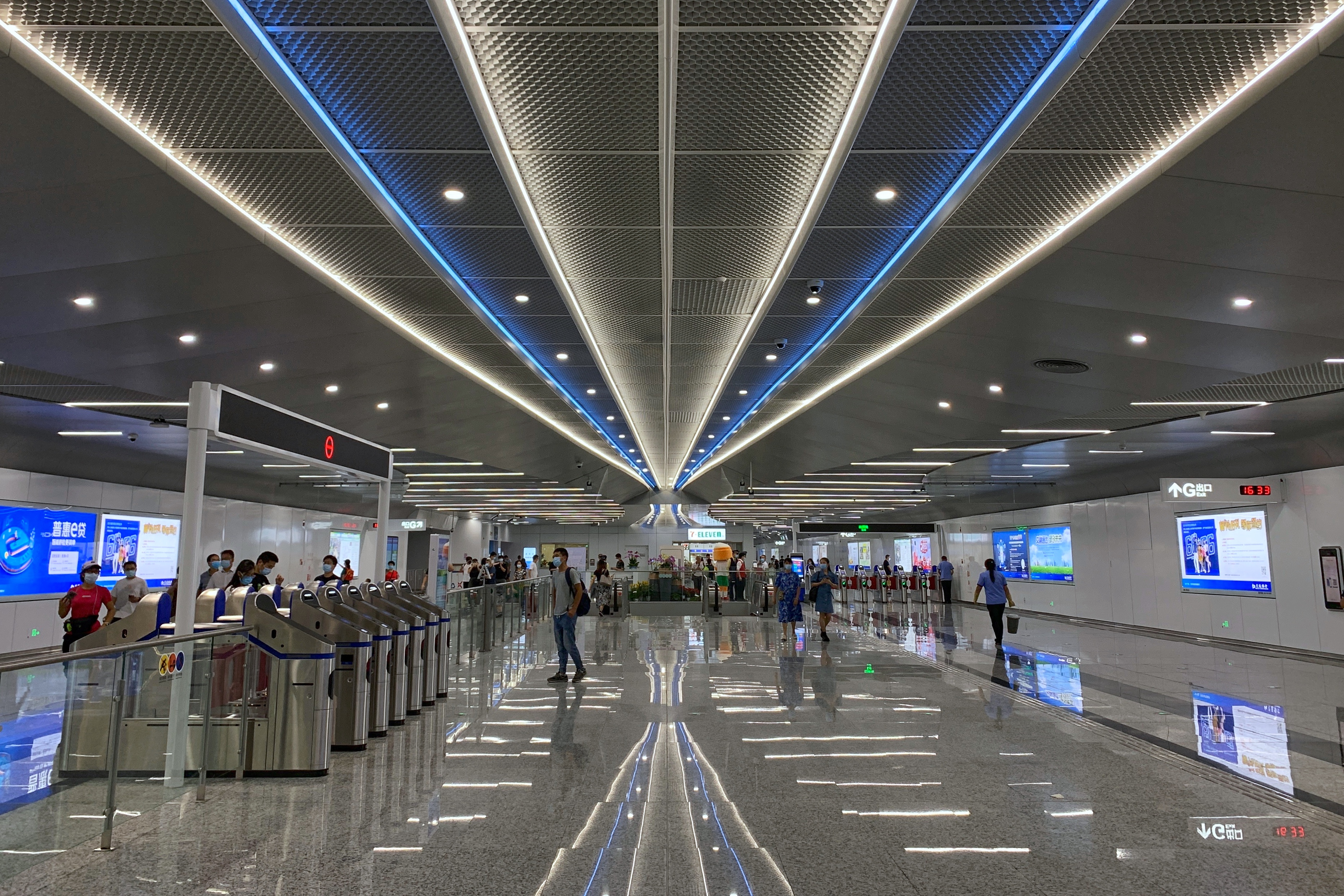
Concourse

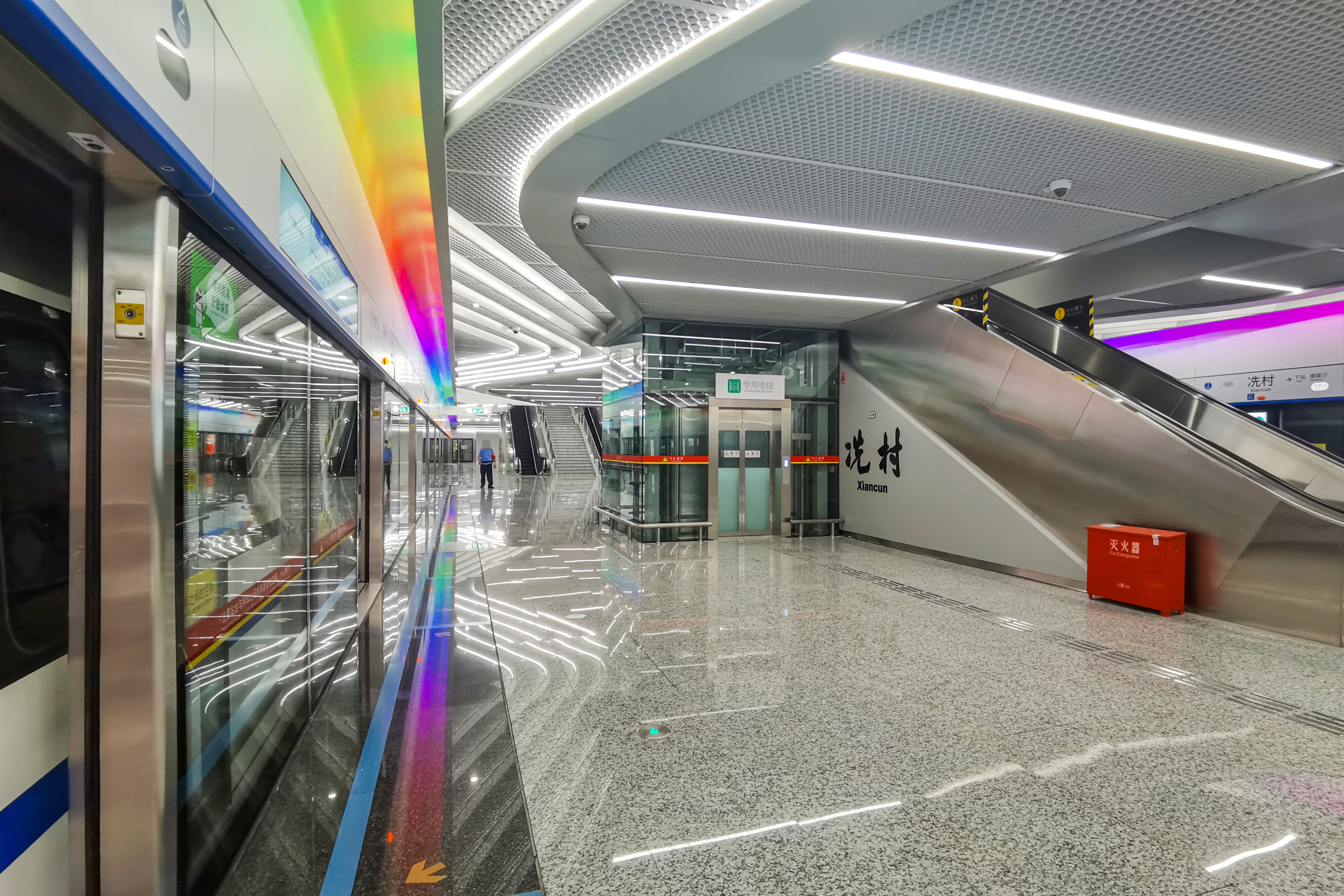
View from platform 2
