= Wanqingsha station =

Guangzhou Metro station

Wanqingsha 万顷沙
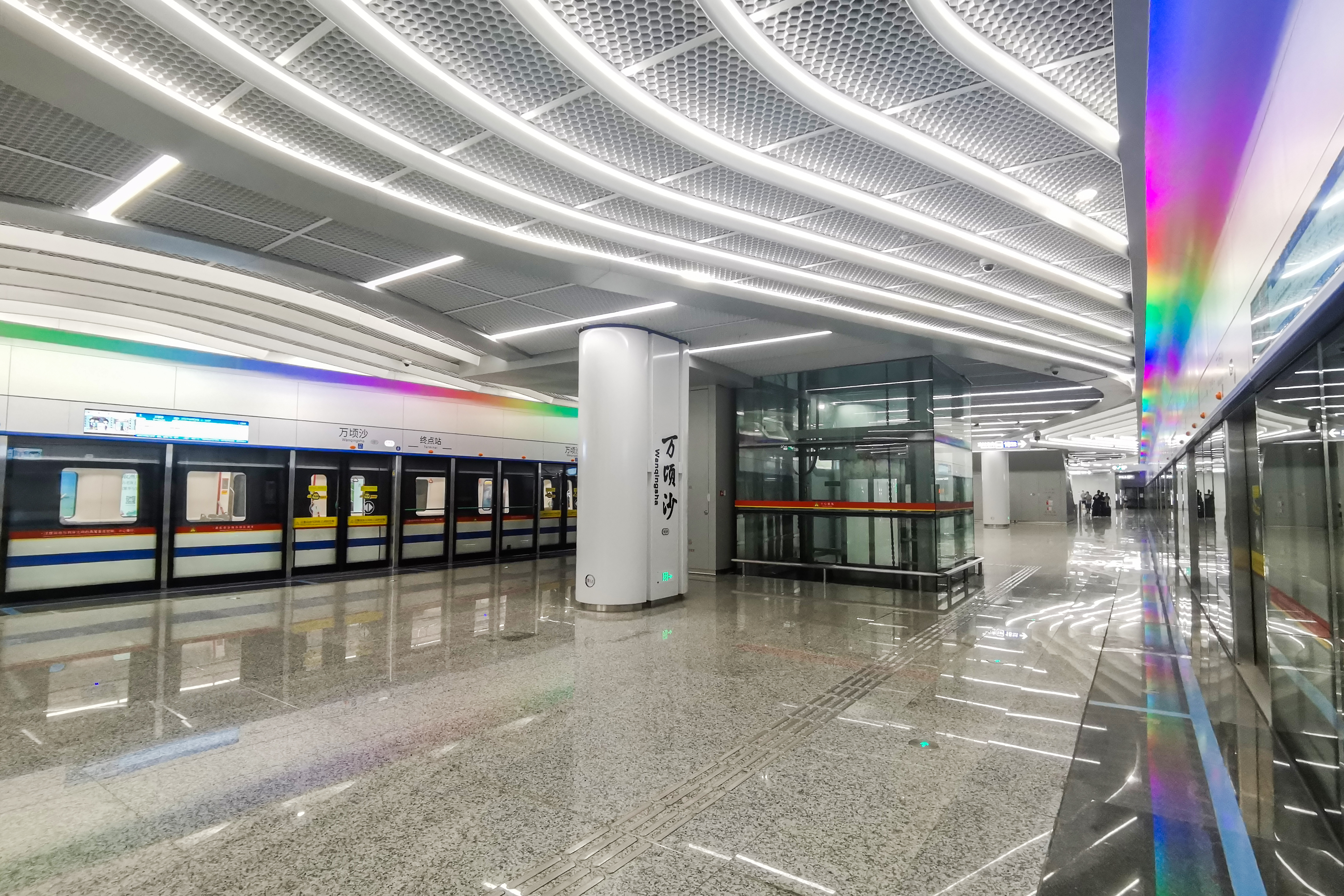
- Platform

Chinese name
- Simplified Chinese: 万顷沙站
- Traditional Chinese: 萬頃沙站
Transcriptions
Standard Mandarin
- Hanyu Pinyin: Wànqǐngshā Zhàn
Yue: Cantonese
- Jyutping: maan^{6}king^{2}saa^{1} zaam^{6}

General information
- Location: Underneath Nansha railway station, Nansha District, Guangzhou, Guangdong; China
- Coordinates: 22.702058°N 113.551394°E
- Operated by: Guangzhou Metro Co. Ltd.
- Line: Line 18
- Platforms: 2 (1 island platform)
- Tracks: 2
- Connections: Nansha railway station

Construction
- Structure type: Underground
- Accessible: Yes

Other information
- Station code: 1801

History
- Opened: 28 September 2021; 4 years ago

Services
Preceding station	Guangzhou Metro	Following station
Hengli towards Xiancun	Line 18	Terminus
Future services
Hengli towards Xiancun	Line 18	Shichong towards Xingzhong
Location

Wanqingsha Station (simplified Chinese: 万顷沙站; traditional Chinese: 萬頃沙站; pinyin: Wànqǐngshā Zhàn; Jyutping: maan^{6}king^{2}saa^{1} zaam^{6}) is a station on Line 18 of the Guangzhou Metro, located underneath Nansha railway station in Guangzhou's Nansha District. It opened on 28 September 2021, and is the current southern terminus of the line. It is also the southernmost station of the Guangzhou Metro system.

== Station information ==
G	Street level	Exits A-D
L1; Mezzanine	Buffer Level	Link to exits and concourse
L2; Concourse	Lobby	Ticket Machines, Customer Service, Shops, Police Station, Safety Facilities
L3; Platforms	Platform 1	18 towards Xiancun (Hengli)
L3; Platforms	Island platform, doors will open on the left
L3; Platforms	Platform 2	18 termination platform

The station has 4 exits, but only Exits C and D are currently operational. Exits A and B worked when the station initially opened, but to facilitate construction of the Line 15 platforms, they were temporarily closed on 11 September 2023. At the same time, Exits C and D opened.

Exit number	Exit location
Exit A	(temporarily closed)
Exit B	(temporarily closed)
Exit C	Tongan Dongwei Road
Exit D	Tongan Dongwei Road

== Future development ==
=== South extension (Nansha to Zhuhai (Zhongshan) Intercity) ===
According to the Guangdong-Hong Kong-Macao Greater Bay Area (Intercity) Railway Construction Plan, Line 18 will continue south towards Zhongshan and Zhuhai, and Wanqingsha Station will become an intermediate station.

=== Line 15 ===
According to the relevant plans of Nansha District and Guangzhou City, Line 15 plans to have a station at Wanqingsha, but Line 18 was not designed to have an interchange with Line 15. The total length of the station of Line 15 is 320 meters, and the width of the standard section is 22.5 meters. It will be built on the northeast side of the Line 18 station, and the two stations will be arranged in parallel and will be connected by a passage through the paid area of the concourse. The line is currently not approved, but construction of the Line 15 station started on 26 March 2022 under the name of "Nansha Station Comprehensive Transportation Hub Subway Reservation Project".

== Gallery ==
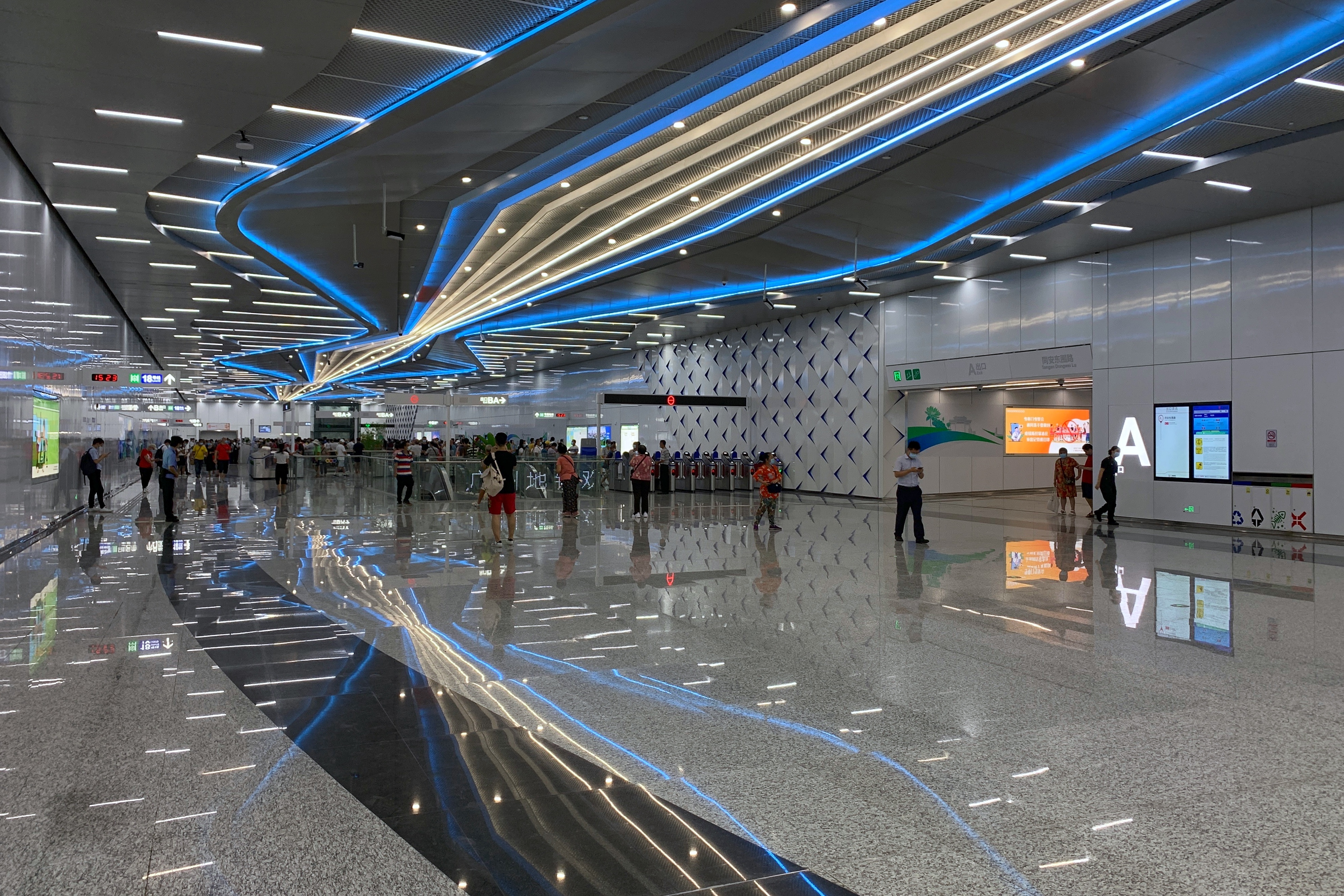
Concourse

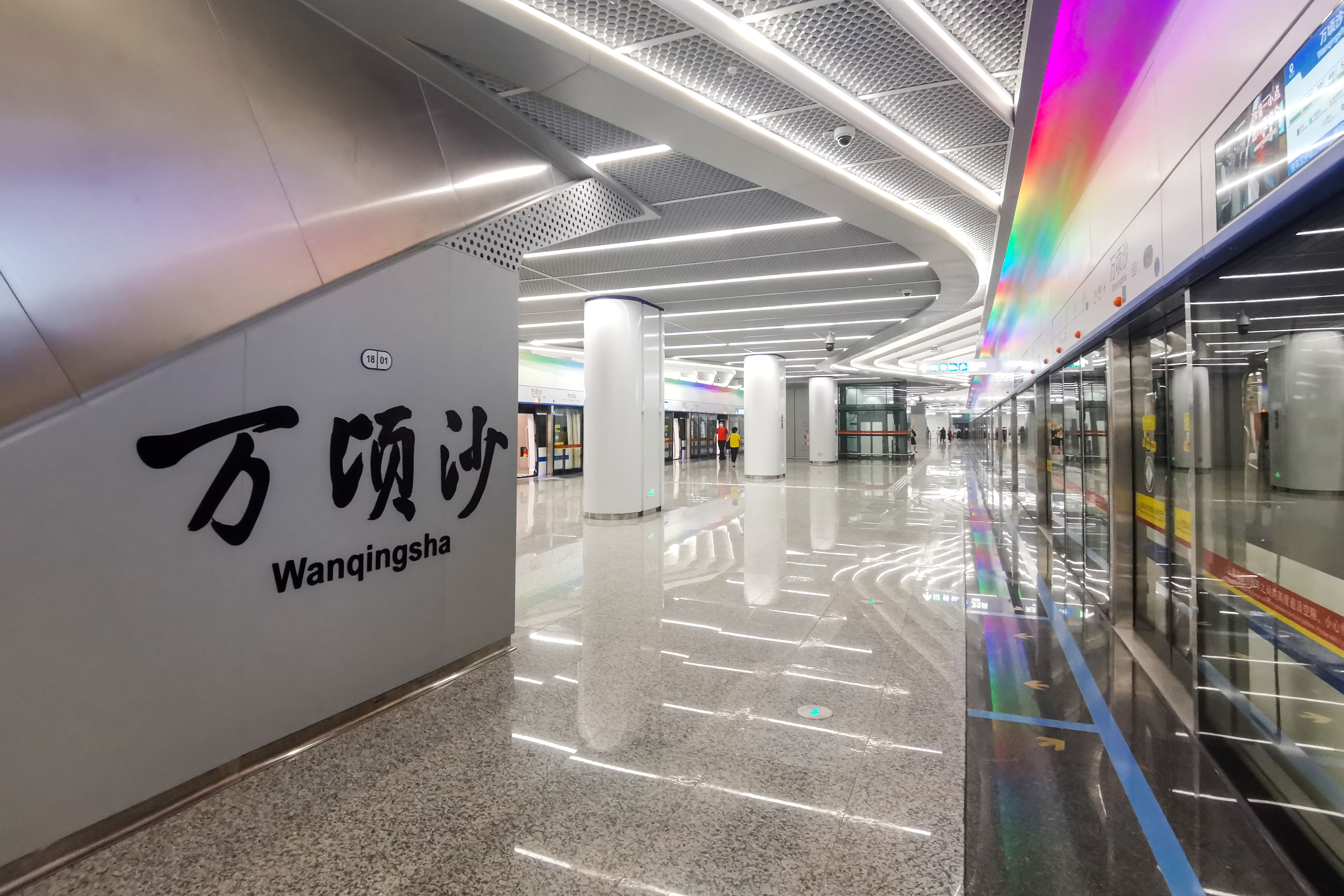
Platform calligraphy
