= ODA =

Oda or ODA may refer to:

== Computing ==
- Open Data Center Alliance, a cloud-computing standards organisation
- Open Design Alliance, a CAD-promoting group
- Optical Disc Archive, an archiving technology
- Open Document Architecture and interchange format, a file format
- Oracle Database Appliance, an Oracle Corporation engineered system

== Government ==
- Office of Detainee Affairs of the US Department of Defense
- Official development assistance, development aid provided by the member states of the Development Assistance Committee (DAC)
- Oklahoma Department of Agriculture, Food, and Forestry
- Ontarians with Disabilities Act, provincial legislation for disabled persons
- US Army Special Forces Operational Detachment-A
- Oregon Department of Agriculture
- Oregon Department of Aviation
- Oregon Office of Degree Authorization
- Organization Designation Authorization, FAA program for designating airworthiness authority
- Overseas Development Administration, predecessor to the United Kingdom's Department for International Development

== Organizations ==
- Civic Democratic Alliance (Czech: Občanská Demokratická Aliance), a political party in the Czech Republic, functional 1989–2007
- Civic Democratic Alliance (2016) (Czech: Občanská Demokratická Aliance), the current political party in the Czech Republic.
- United Nations Office for Disarmament Affairs, United Nations Office for Disarmament Affairs
- Ohio Department of Agriculture
- Ohio Dental Association
- Olympic Delivery Authority, one of the two main agencies that organised the London Olympic Games
- Ontario Dental Association
- Organization for Democratic Action, alternate name for the Da'am Workers Party, a political party in Israel
- Overseas Development Administration, forerunner of the UK Department for International Development

== People ==
=== Given name ===
- Oda, a Germanic female name with diminutive Odette
- Oda of Canterbury (died 958), Archbishop of Canterbury from 942
- Saint Oda (680–726) of Scotland (c. 680 – c. 726), a Dutch Roman Catholic saint supposedly of Scottish origin
- Oda of Meissen (c. 996 – aft. 1018), first Queen of Poland
- Oda Hassepaß (born 1974), German politician

=== Surname ===
- Oda (surname)
- Oda clan (Japanese: 織田家), a Japanese feudal clan from the Muromachi/Sengoku period

== Places ==
- Ōda, Shimane, a city in Japan
- Oda, Ghana

== Others ==
- 4,4'-Oxydianiline, a chemical compound
- Only Dreamers Achieve, a record label created by Polo G
- Oda (Albania), typical Albanian room
- 1144 Oda, an asteroid
- Oda, nickname for the Izh 2126, a compact hatchback automobile
- Out-of-Door Academy, school in Sarasota, Florida, United States
- Operational Detachment-Alpha, the standard 12-man team composed of US Army Special Forces operators
- Offline Data Authentication, a stage in EMV credit card payment authorization
- Oda Station (disambiguation)
