= 大田 =

大田 means "large field" in Chinese characters, and may refer to:

- Daejeon or 대전광역시 (大田廣域市), a city in South Korea
- Datian County (大田县), a county in Sanming, Fujian, China
- Ōda, Shimane (大田市), a city in Shimane, Japan
- Ōta, Ōita (大田村), a former village in Nishikunisaki, Ōita, Japan
- Ōta, Tokyo (大田区), a special ward of Tokyo, Japan

== People with the surname ==
- Hiroko Ōta (大田 弘子, born 1954), Japanese politician and a researcher of economics
- Masahide Ōta (大田 昌秀, 1925–2017), former governor of Okinawa, Japan
- Nanami Ohta (大田 ななみ, born 1993), Japanese actress
- Ōta Nanpo (大田 南畝), Japanese poet and fiction writer
- Princess Ōta (大田皇女, 644–668), eldest daughter of Emperor Tenji

== See also ==
- Daejeon (disambiguation)
- Datian (disambiguation)
- Oda (disambiguation)
- Ohta (disambiguation)
