= Bird kill =

Localized death of bird populations

Bird kill is a localized event resulting in the death of large numbers of birds at the same time.

== Scientific explanations ==
Large die offs of animals are not unusual in nature, and happen for a variety of reasons including bad weather, disease, and poisonings, with pollution and climate change adding to the stresses on wildlife. According to the USGS National Wildlife Health Center in the US, 175 mass deaths events exceeding 1,000 birds has occurred over the past 10 years.

Russian scientist Afanasiy Ilich Tobonov researched mass animal deaths in the 1990s and concluded that the mass deaths of birds and wildlife in the Sakha Republic were noted only along the flight paths of space rockets.

== Examples ==
- Jatinga, a village in India, is infamous for its mysterious mass bird suicides.
- In 2004 thousands of tiny birds fell from the sky over Chinese president Hu Jintao's birthplace Taizhou, Jiangsu. The event was seen as a worrying omen for his rule to come.
- 15 January 2009, in New York City. A large flock of Canada geese was struck by US Airways Flight 1549, disabling both of the Airbus A320's engines and killing an unknown number of geese.
- 2009 in Franklin Township, Somerset County, New Jersey. A culling with the bird poison (avicide) DRC-1339 received national attention after USDA employees dispensed the substance in Griggstown, New Jersey to kill an estimated 5,000 starlings that plagued feed lots and dairies on local farms. When "it began raining birds" community members became alarmed, unsure whether a toxin or disease was at work. Two property owners in the area reported collecting over 150 birds each from their land.
- December, 2010, in St-Augustin-de-Desmaures, Quebec. More than 80 dead pigeons discovered.
- 31 December 2010, in Guelph, Ontario. Geese and ducks panicked, some of them died shortly after the beginning of New Year's Eve fireworks at 8:10 pm, 31 December 2010.
- 31 December 2010, in Beebe, Arkansas. 3,000 red-winged blackbirds and European starlings died. Arkansas state wildlife authorities first received reports on 31 December 2010, shortly before midnight. Further investigation revealed the birds fell over a one-mile area of Beebe, with no other dead birds found outside that concentrated zone. The birds showed signs of physical trauma, leading one ornithologist with the Arkansas Game and Fish Commission to speculate the blackbirds might have been killed by lightning, high-altitude hail or possibly fireworks. The birds were sent to laboratories in Georgia and Wisconsin for necropsies to determine the cause of death. On 5 January 2011 the Arkansas Game and Fish Commission confirmed that the incident was caused by a resident setting off professional-grade fireworks, startling the birds into a panic flight. One year later a virtual reprise took place with 5,000 birds plunging to the ground. (See below)
- 3 January 2011, in Pointe Coupee Parish, Louisiana. 500 red-winged blackbirds and starlings died.
- 5 January 2011, in Faenza, Italy. Hundreds, perhaps thousands, of turtle doves fell dead from the sky.
- 5 January 2011, in Falköping in Sweden. Between 50 and 100 jackdaws died. Some are believed to have been struck by cars or trucks, but others showed no sign of such trauma.
- 5 January 2011, in Constanța, Romania. Eyewitnesses saw dozens of starlings falling from skies "like stones".
- 22 October 2011, in Wasaga Beach, Ontario, Canada. Thousands of dead loons, ducks, and seagulls washed ashore, believed to have died from a botulism outbreak.
- 12 December 2011, in Utah, about 1,500 grebes crash-landed on a Walmart parking lot, a highway, and football fields, apparently mistaking them for a body of water at night.
- 31 December 2011 saw a recurrence of what had happened in Beebe, Arkansas on the previous New Year's Eve. Several hundred blackbirds had plunged to their deaths according to an early report by the local television station KATV which also reported that its radar had shown a "large mass" over the town.
- 30 January 2018, in Draper, Utah. More than 200 birds fell from the sky. 17 remained alive and were transferred to a local rehabilitation center.
- 11 December 2019, in Wales. About 300 starlings found dead with their internal organs spewing out.
- 6 October 2023, 1000 songbirds found dead after striking McCormick Place, a convention center in Chicago, Illinois.

== See also ==
- Bird conservation
- Fish kill
- Avicide
- Four Pests Campaign
- 2010–2011 midwinter animal mass death events
