= HZQ =

HZQ may refer to:

- HZQ, telegraph code for Jiangmenbei railway station on the Guangzhou–Zhuhai railway, China
- HZQ, division code for Huizhou District, China
- HZQ, abbreviation for Hessisches Zentrum für Qualitätssicherung und Qualitätsmanagement, an institution of the Frankfurt University of Applied Sciences
