= Jiangcun railway station =

Railway station in Baiyun District, Guangzhou, Guangdong

Jiangcun 江村
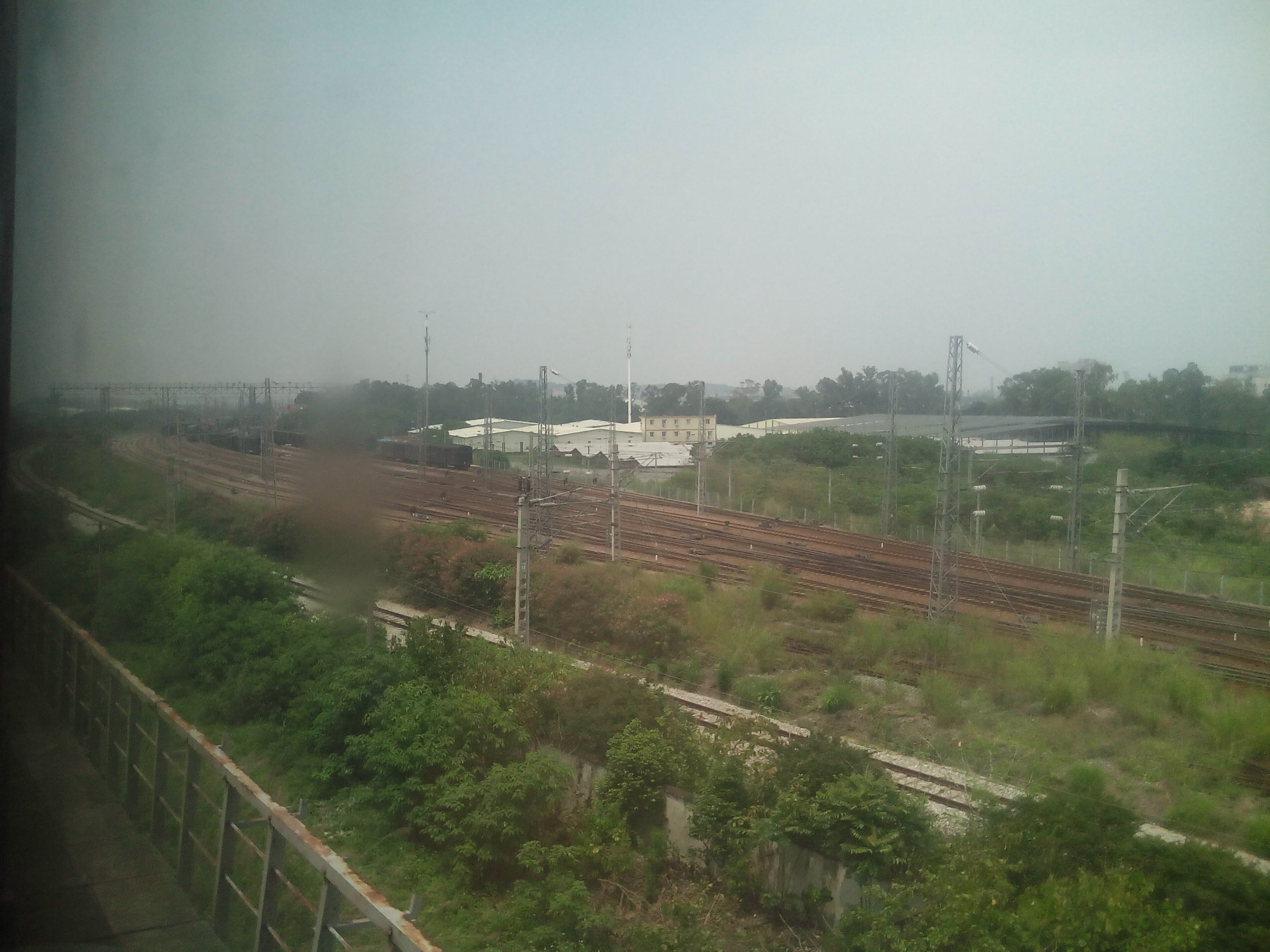

General information
- Location: Baiyun District, Guangzhou, Guangdong; China
- Coordinates: 23°18′10.56″N 113°12′48″E
- Line(s): Beijing–Guangzhou railway; Guangzhou–Zhuhai railway; Guangzhou–Shitan railway

Jiangcun railway station (Chinese: 江村站) is a freight-handling railway station in Baiyun District, Guangzhou, Guangdong, China. It is an intermediate stop on the Beijing–Guangzhou railway and the terminus of both the Guangzhou–Zhuhai railway and the Guangshi line. It is the largest marshalling station in South China.

On 15 September 1999, the name of this station was changed from Guangzhou North railway station to Jiangcun.
