= C7H8ClN =

The molecular formula C_{7}H_{8}ClN (molar mass: 141.60 g/mol) may refer to:

- 4-Chloro-o-toluidine (4-chloro-2-methylaniline)
- Starlicide (3-chloro-4-methylaniline)
