= Common raven physiology =

Physiology of the common raven

The common raven (Corvus corax), also known as the northern raven, is a large, all-black passerine bird. Found across the Northern Hemisphere, it is the most widely distributed of all corvids. Their Northern range encompasses Arctic and temperate regions of Eurasia and North America, and they reach as far South as Northern Africa and Central America. The common raven is an incredibly versatile passerine to account for this distribution, and their physiology varies with this versatility. This article discusses its physiology, including its homeostasis, respiration, circulatory system, and osmoregulation.

== Physiology ==
=== Habitat variation and physiological regulation ===
Maintaining homeostasis through internal regulatory mechanisms is directly affected by habitat variation. The common raven is considered to be a homeotherm, an endotherm, and a regulator, so it is required to adjust its internal physiological state in response to environmental changes. Food habitats influence the metabolic rate of the Common Raven. Since common ravens are omnivores, metabolic rates must fluctuate according to the type of food consumed. According to one study, species that consume only fruit possess lower metabolisms compared to species that ate both fruit and insect material. The high metabolic rate of the common raven is partially due to the diversity of its diet.

Altitude is another factor that requires the common raven to regulate. Organisms existing at elevations below 1,100 m (3,500 ft) feet have lower metabolisms than organisms living at higher altitudes. Generally, warmer temperatures are associated with lower altitudes, so less energy is required to maintain a constant internal temperature. Bergmann's rule can also be applied to the common raven. Individuals inhabiting higher altitudes and exposed to colder temperatures are usually larger than ravens living at lower latitudes or in warmer temperatures. Also, higher altitudes are associated with lower oxygen partial pressure, so ravens living at high elevations are confronted with reduced oxygen availability. To compensate for less ambient oxygen, common ravens undergo increased respiratory rates, enhanced oxygen loading of hemoglobin at the respiratory surface, and improved oxygen affinity of hemoglobin.

Common ravens occupy a widespread geographical range and are found in many different habitats, including tundra, seacoasts, cliffs, mountainous forests, plains, deserts, and woodlands. Due to such a diverse habitat, this species is exposed to various temperatures and amounts of precipitation. Individuals that exist in warmer, drier environments have lower basal metabolic rates than organisms inhabiting non-arid areas. Physiologically, a reduced metabolic rate decreases endogenous heat production to prevent evaporative water loss, or more simply evaporation, and conserve energy in an environment with limited resources. A reduction of total evaporative water loss consists of decreases of both respiratory and cutaneous evaporation. In contrast, common ravens living at higher latitudes in temperate regions experience high basal metabolic rates. A higher metabolism is related to increased thermogenesis and cold tolerance.

In relation to temperature and precipitation, common ravens are exposed to changing seasons with climate extremes. Within the common raven species, the degree of climatic seasonality is related to the magnitude of fluctuations in basal metabolic rate and total evaporative water loss. For instance, populations living in Alberta are subjected to both extremely cold temperatures in the winter and very hot and dry weather during the summer months. Furthermore, the common raven is not known to migrate long distances to avoid the winter season, so it is required to regulate and cope with the environmental conditions.

Habitat variation often leads to changes in activity levels. Ravens engaged in flight are considered metabolically active. During periods of flight, the cells require more oxygen, and the heat generated must be dissipated to avoid hyperthermia. In response, the common raven experiences an increased heart rate and cardiac output. Another method used by many species of birds to regulate thermal conductance is by internally adjusting blood flow through shunt vessels. More specifically, arterial and venous blood vessels are organized to bypass the countercurrent heat exchange occurring in the upper portion of a bird's legs. Countercurrent heat exchange involves arrangements of blood vessels that allow heat to transfer from warm arterial blood to cooler venous blood travelling to the body's core. Through this mechanism, arterial blood remains warm before reaching the body's periphery.

=== Respiration ===
Ravens have a high metabolic rate that drives flight. Air flow is directed through the lungs via air sacs. The sacs are used to create a continuous unidirectional flow of fresh air over the respiratory surface. Most birds have nine air sacs, grouped into anterior and posterior sacs, but the common raven as a member of the Passeriformes group only has seven air sacs (missing two cervical air sacs). The common raven can be found in all parts of the globe. At higher altitudes and in warmer climates the oxygen concentration in the air is lower compared to low altitude or colder climate. Also, flight is a much more metabolically demanding movement then walking or running, and therefore we see a proportionally larger respiratory system in birds than in mammals.

The respiratory tract of birds possesses unique air movement properties. Air moves in a unidirectional flow and blood travels in a concurrent direction to air flow. An advantage of this type of system is it minimizes dead space and enables the bird to maintain a highly oxidative, active output. The respiratory system of the common raven is no different.

Flight is a unique feat among birds and provides them with many advantages in terms of food, predation, and movement. It is suggested that cardiovascular variables play a large part in avian flight and were naturally selected over time. Specifically, the avian heart evolved to pump more blood throughout a bird's body while it is engaged in flight. During rigorous activity, especially when flying, the demand for oxygen is high.

Birds proceed through the four steps of the oxygen cascade: 1. Convection of oxygen to lungs via ventilation 2. The diffusion of oxygen from the lungs into the blood stream 3. Oxygen-rich blood is transported to the peripheral tissues by convection 4. Oxygen diffuses into the mitochondria.

Fick's laws of diffusion can be applied to oxygen cascade events in avian species. There is a proportional relationship between the volume of the pulmonary capillaries and respiratory surface area. Avian respiration follows a system of countercurrent flow in which inspiratory and expiratory processes are dependent on an efficient rate of diffusion to oxygenate blood through the air capillaries. The optimization of the volume of tissue within the capillaries in conjunction with the large respiratory surface area allow for an effective diffusion rate. Finally, in the avian respiratory system, the partial pressure of oxygen between the gas, lung, and the vascular capillaries depends upon the ventilation rate and air that is already inhaled.

Through the respiratory pathway of evaporative water loss, the common raven is able to effectively maintain body temperature within their variable range. The mechanism by which Passeriformes such as the common raven regulate evaporative water loss comes in the form of respiration through panting. Unlike mammalian endotherms, birds do not have sweat glands and instead must rely on respiratory and cutaneous gas exchange to regulate body water. Passeriformees like Corvus corax are also reliant on panting, as they depend much less on supplementary processes such as cutaneous evaporative heat exchange and gular fluttering. This involves a gradual increase in the exchange of gases and breathing rate. This increased breathing rate is induced by an increased tidal volume along with a greater ventilation of the mucosal surfaces. As well, a higher breathing rate leads to an increase in the resting metabolic rate of the individual.

A unique feature of avian respiration involves the usage of turbinates within the nasal cavity during routine breathing. The nasal cavities in avian taxa are the first organ to moderate the inhalation of air humidity during periods of rest. The epithelial-lined turbinates within these cavities act as countercurrent heat exchangers. During this exchange, air inhaled becomes saturated as it brought further down into the respiratory tract. The air being exhaled stays saturated, allowing for a recovery of heat and moisture.

=== Circulation ===
Like all avian species, the blood of the common raven transports nutrients, oxygen, carbon dioxide, metabolic waste products, hormones, and heat. Avian blood possesses a more alkaline pH ranging from 7.5 to 7.6, and blood bicarbonate values are between 16 and 32 mmol/L. In addition, pumping blood has a carbon dioxide partial pressure of about 28 mmHg, which is lower than that of placental mammals. Therefore, bird species, including the common raven, seem to be in an acute state of respiratory alkalosis relative to mammals. Alterations of respiratory patterns in response to changing oxygen needs do not severely affect the pH of arterial blood.

Glucose, calcium and proteins are other components of avian blood's chemical properties. Blood glucose levels range from 200 to 400 mg/dL and can increase with stress. Calcium levels are approximately 8 to 12 mg/dL, and total protein, which consists of albumin and globulins, is between 3 and 5.5 mg/dl. Since the common raven flies at high altitudes, efficient gas exchange between the respiratory and circulatory systems permits this species to tolerate hypoxia. Due to the unidirectional flow of air and the high oxygen affinity of avian hemoglobin, blood leaving the parabronchi has almost equivalent oxygen partial pressure as inhaled air. Avian hearts pump more blood per unit time than mammalian hearts. Cardiac output (mL/minute) can be calculated by multiplying heart rate (beats/minute) by stroke volume (mL/beat).

Like other vertebrates with closed circulatory systems, pumping blood of the common raven can be described by several physiological principles. These principles and laws include diffusion, blood viscosity, osmotic pressure, LaPlace's Law (Young-Laplace Equation), Poiseuille's Law (Hagen-Poiseuille equation), and the Frank-Starling law of the heart. The osmotic pressure of the common raven is low compared to mammalian species. Reduced osmotic pressure is due to a lower concentration of plasma albumin protein.

==== Blood composition ====
The blood composition of the common raven is similar to that of most avian species. In general, the blood is composed of plasma and cells. Plasma contains approximately 85% water and 9-11% protein. The remaining components include glucose, amino acids, hormones, electrolytes, antibodies and waste products. The erythrocytes (red blood cells) of the common raven are elliptical with a centrally located oval nucleus. Avian blood has counts of between 2.5 and 4 million red blood cells per cubic millimetre. The red blood cells of birds are larger than those of mammals and have a short life span of 28 to 45 days. Common Ravens' erythrocytes contain two components of hemoglobin. Hemoglobin A accounts for 60% to 90% of the total, and the remainder is hemoglobin D. Avian thrombocytes contain a nucleus and are involved in hemostasis. Avian white blood cells include lymphocytes, heterophiles, monocytes, and eosinophils.

=== Osmoregulation ===
==== Environmental challenges on osmoregulation ====
The Corvus corax lives in a wide variety of habitats, and as such it is well suited to many different environments Because Corvus corax is an osmoregulator, living in a terrestrial habitat presents some challenges for Corvus corax as it must consistently ingest water and salts to balance the content of its blood. To regulate solute concentration, common ravens use their kidneys to regulate blood composition and filter out toxins. This filtering results in the formation of a dilute excrement which is then released from the cloaca. The ability of the kidney to retain water and concentrate dilute urine is modulated by the osmolarity gradient induced by a countercurrent exchange system in the renal medulla. Corvus corax is an omnivore, and as such consumes whatever is available to it depending on its environment. This can include but is not limited to invertebrates such as insects, fruit when available, potentially other birds and their eggs. Corvus corax is an opportunistic hunter, relying on social cues and sense of sight to find food. When not hunting, Corvus corax is typically scavenger, and much of its intake comes in the form of carrion and garbage left behind by humans and large vertebrates. The difference in diet between the populations of Corvus corax in marine environments in comparison to terrestrial environments is immense; ravens near the more marine based terrestrial habitat prey primarily on gulls eggs and hatchlings as well as supplementing their diet with seaweed.

These populations have a much higher intake of salt compared to the populations in the more inland regions and therefore produce a more potent hypotonic excrement. A diet with sufficient salt concentrations pushes ravens in marine environments to focus on water intake. This is primarily through the food it eats, but if this is not sufficient it will drink water or consume snow in the winter. Corvus corax is adapted to survive across its large range, and as such exhibits a number of variations in osmoregulation to suit its environmental needs. Because these birds are omnivores, their basal rates reflect the diet they follow along with other factors such as environmental conditions.

The interactions between this species and humans present various challenges for these birds. Trash and carrion scraps, whether anthropogenic in origin or not, present opportunities for feeding consistent with ravens' scavenging behavior. These food placements attract breeding and non-breeding birds, which present competitive challenges for breeding adults collecting food for their broods. Corvus corax also present several problems in their normal ranges for humans, and as such efforts to reduce their numbers through osmoregulatory means factor into the viability of this species in certain regions. Specifically, the use of the toxicant 3-chloro-4-methylanine hydrochloride (DRC-1339) is used to induce renal failure and death in ravens impacting the conservation status of other species of bird and livestock numbers.

==== Primary osmoregulatory organ or system ====
Regulation of water and electrolyte balance, or osmoregulation, within the internal environment of common ravens involves the interaction of the kidneys, intestinal tract, skin, and respiratory tracts. However, the kidneys are the primary osmoregulatory organs with the primary function of eliminating wastes and excess water and solutes.

Like other birds, the common raven is considered a uricotelic organism with an osmoregulatory system consisting of a pair of kidneys that constitute 0.8% of its body mass. Similar to mammalian species, the functional units of avian kidneys are the nephrons. Externally, the kidneys are elongated and have three lobes, and the inner portion contains a cortex and medulla. Within the cortex, nephrons are organized around central veins of the efferent venous system. In contrast, the medulla is structured into medullary cones that contain nephron elements, specifically collecting ducts and loops of Henle. As the collecting ducts descend through the medulla, they combine and empty their contents into the ureter.

There are two types of avian nephrons, and nephrons become larger as depth from the kidney surface increases. Reptilian-type nephrons are the smallest nephrons, are found near a kidney's surface, possess simple glomeruli, and do not have loops of Henle. Conversely, between 10% and 30% of the total nephron population is composed of mammalian-type nephrons, which are located in the innermost area of the kidney, have complex glomeruli, and contain loops of Henle.

Once the kidneys receive blood, filtration of substances from the blood into urine takes place. The glomerular filtration rate of single nephrons in birds is low because avian glomeruli have small surface area. Through the process of reabsorption, the majority of the fluid volume and solutes are transported from the urine to the blood. Next, secretion of materials from the renal epithelia into the urine occurs. Finally, urine as the end product travels to the ureters to be excreted. The kidneys of a common raven filter about eleven times its total body water daily, and more than 95% of the filtered water is reabsorbed. Urine of birds is typically concentrated to an osmolarity that is two to three times the osmolarity of plasma. Glomerular filtration only accounts for 10% to 20% of urinary urate. Greater than 90% of urate excreted by the kidneys is derived from the process of secretion.

==== Circulation and respiration ====
The osmoregulatory system is interconnected with the circulatory system to permit effective regulation of salt and water balance. Circulatory fluids function in renal clearance, which is the blood volume that substances are removed from within the kidneys during a certain time period. In addition to filtration, the circulatory system also plays a role in reabsorption. Furthermore, the role of the renal portal system is to regulate renal hemodynamics during times of decreased arterial blood pressure.

Kidneys of common ravens receive arterial and afferent venous blood and are drained by efferent veins. In terms of the arterial blood supply, the arteries entering the kidneys branch into numerous smaller arteries and eventually form afferent arterioles that supply the glomeruli. The peritubular blood supply is composed of efferent arterioles leaving the glomeruli of reptilian-type nephrons that drain into sinuses of the cortex. On the other hand, the vasa recta are formed by efferent arterioles exiting the glomeruli of mammalia-type nephrons. Next, the renal portal system, which involves the afferent veins, obtains blood from the ischiadic and external iliac veins. The renal portal valve is situated between the renal portal vein and the common iliac vein which leads to the posterior vena cava. Closing of the valve directs the blood to flow into the renal portal vein, and when the valve is open, blood flows into the vena cava. After entering the renal portal vein, blood enters the peritubular blood supply. Here, blood from the portal veins and the efferent arterioles are mixed and travel out of the kidneys through the efferent veins. Alternatively, blood can also flow towards the liver.

Research indicates that kidneys of avian species receive approximately 10% to 15% of cardiac output. The renal blood of common ravens is composed of various molecules. As was stated earlier, approximately 95% of the filtered water is reabsorbed into the blood supply. Since birds are able to produce hyperosmotic urine, the blood plasma usually contains a lot of water. In normally hydrated birds, the blood concentrations of arginine vasotocin, which is a peptide hormone involved in regulating plasma water concentrations, is 10pg/mL. Other hormones within the blood supply include angiotensin, aldosterone, and atrial natriuretic peptide. In addition, plasma sodium concentrations are maintained within normal levels even when dietary sodium intake is altered in order to regulate blood pressure, greater than 98% of filtered calcium is reabsorbed, and about 60% of filtered phosphate is excreted in urine. Before filtration, plasma urate concentration is between 0.1 and 0.7 mM. Finally, the arterial pH of birds is alkaline and maintained at a value of approximately 7.5.

The avian respiratory system is not in direct contact with the osmoregulatory system. However, the respiratory tract participates in osmoregulation through evaporative water loss. Since common ravens are endothermic and have high rates of ventilation, respiratory water loss is inevitable.

==== Cells and mechanisms of osmoregulation ====
===== Filtration into Bowman's capsule =====
The kidneys in aves are divided into units called lobules. Within each lobule are numerous nephrons responsible for filtering blood. Arterial blood that is directed to the kidney enters the glomerulus under high pressure and leaks out in between the endothelial cells of the glomerular capillaries into Bowman's capsules. The blood plasma filtrate contains waste along with non-waste essentials like glucose and ions. Once the filtrate enters the proximal tubule reabsorption of metabolically useful molecules into the blood begins.

===== Reabsorption in proximal tubes =====
Reabsorption of molecules and ions back into the blood from the proximal tube is done via epithelial cells. The epithelial cell create a low Na+ concentration within the cell by actively pumping out Na+ into the blood via a Na+/K+ ATPase pump on the basolateral membrane. The osmotic gradient allows for the cotransport of Na+ with molecules such as Cl-, glucose, and vitamins into the epithelial cell from the apical side (side facing the proximal tubule). Water freely crosses the apical side into the epithelial cell following the solutes entering actively. With all the essential molecules inside the epithelial cell, some such as Cl-, glucose and vitamins pass through their respective channels on the basal lateral side into the blood. Na+ continues to be pumped into the blood maintaining the osmotic gradient allowing for continuous reabsorption of these molecules and ions. Terrestrial birds like the Corvus corax produce urine that is osmotically more concentrated than their blood plasma. This is likely due to the fact that water is not as abundant in raven habitat.

===== Regulating water loss =====
A key function of the Loop of Henle is to provide a large distance over which ions are transported out of the nephrons and since water will follow the transport of ions out of the nephrons, the Loop of Henle is an important structure to insure minimal water lose out the ureters. Since not all nephrons of aves have the Loop of Henle, a bird's ability to create a hypertonic filtrate can be more challenging than mammals'. In response to dehydration birds release a hormone known as arginine vasotocin (AVT) into the blood. Among its roles AVT reduces the rate at which blood plasma filters out of the glomeruli and into the Bowman's capsule. This reduces the total amount of water leaving the blood. Another function of AVT is its ability to increase permeability of the collecting ducts by opening protein water channels. These channels, called aquaporins, allow more solutes to leave the collecting duct and water will follow through osmosis. These two functions of AVT allow birds to maintain a concentrated urine. Avian kidneys do not send urine to a bladder. Instead it is sent via the ureters to the cloaca to be deposited into the lower intestine. The epithelium of the lower intestine absorbs a large amount of sodium chloride, and water follows osmotically to be reabsorbed into the blood stream. This final step insures a concentrated waste product with minimal water and ion loss from excretion.

==== Special adaptations ====
Since the expansion of the human population and urbanization, there have been numerous extinctions of birds. Extinctions threaten nearly 12% of bird species, but this does not account for an additional 12% of species located in small geographical ranges where human actions rapidly destroy habitats. Due to pressures from humans and the environment, birds have unique features that permit adaptations to changing conditions.

The common raven migrates long distances for food and mating. Since ravens, and birds in general, travel to such extents, they have a unique adaptation for flying in high altitude environments. Specifically, neural mediating reflexes increase breathing. The locomotors system stimulates breathing directly from feed forward stimulation from brainstem centers and feedback stimulation from exercising muscles. In the carotid body, the bird's chemoreceptors detect low oxygen and stimulate breathing during hypoxia. Also, if breathing is hypoxic, the bird can use CO_{2}/pH-sensitive chemoreceptors to restrain breathing. Due to ventilatory responses, this process leads to secondary hypocapnia. Because birds are exposed to a wide variety of toxic gases and air borne particles in the environment, studies have used birds to measure air quality.

Not only is a bird's respiration adapted to handle high-altitude flight, but so too is the circulatory system. In general, birds have larger heart sizes and higher cardiac output. During flight, birds can sustain their heart rates, and their myosin flight muscles have better oxygen diffusion because of a high degree of branching between the capillaries.

The common raven lives in a wide variety of climates. Due to its habitat and food, the common raven has unique features that allow it to regulate osmotic challenges. Common ravens can be observed in oceans consuming water. However, when birds consume salt loaded prey or drink salt water, the body's internal osmoregularity increases. The solution produced is considerably more concentrated than seawater. Birds are the only group of vertebrates that have the ability to produce hyposmotic urine. The ability to produce hyposmotic urine is from the medullary cones. Urine is mixed with digestive fluids rather than directly eliminated. Consequently, the avian gut plays an important role in water and salt regulation. In mammals, the osmotic gradient is urea, whereas in birds, sodium chloride is the major solute in the medullary cones. In birds, the kidneys are not solely responsible for osmoregulation. A unique feature in birds is the lower intestine, which absorbs fluids and electrolytes that were not absorbed by the small intestine or the kidneys. These osmoregulatory adaptations allow the common raven to thrive in diverse habitats.
