= Tetsuji =

- Gender: Male

Origin
- Origin: Japanese
- Meaning: Different meanings depending on the kanji used

Tetsuji (written: 哲二, 哲治, 鉄二, 鉄史, 轍次 or 徹治) is a masculine Japanese given name. Notable people with the name include:

- Tetsuji Fukushima (福島 鉄次; 1914-1992), Japanese manga artist
- Tetsuji Hashiratani (柱谷 哲二; born 1964), Japanese footballer and manager
- Tetsuji Hayashi (林 哲司; born 1949), Japanese composer and singer-songwriter
- Tetsuji Hiratsuka (平塚 哲二; born 1971), Japanese golfer
- Tetsuji Isozaki (礒﨑 哲史; born 1969), Japanese politician
- Tetsuji Kato (加藤 鉄史; born 1977), Japanese mixed martial artist
- Tetsuji Miwa (三輪 哲二; born 1949), Japanese mathematician
- Tetsuji Morohashi (諸橋 轍次; 1883–1982), Japanese lexicographer and sinologist
- Tetsuji Murakami (村上 哲次; 1927–1987), Japanese karateka
- Tetsuji Nakamura (中村 哲治; born 1971), Japanese politician
- Tetsuji Oda (born 1948), Japanese electrical engineer
- Tetsuji Sakakibara (榊原 徹士; born 1989), Japanese singer, actor and fashion model
- Tetsuji Shioda (塩田 徹治), Japanese mathematician
- Tetsuji Takechi (武智 鉄二; 1912–1988), Japanese theatre and film director
- Tetsuji Tamanaka (玉中 哲二; born 1962), Japanese professional race car driver
- Tetsuji Tamayama (玉山 鉄二; born 1980), Japanese actor
