= Fish kill =

Localized die-off of fish populations

External videos
- Red tide outbreak and fish kill

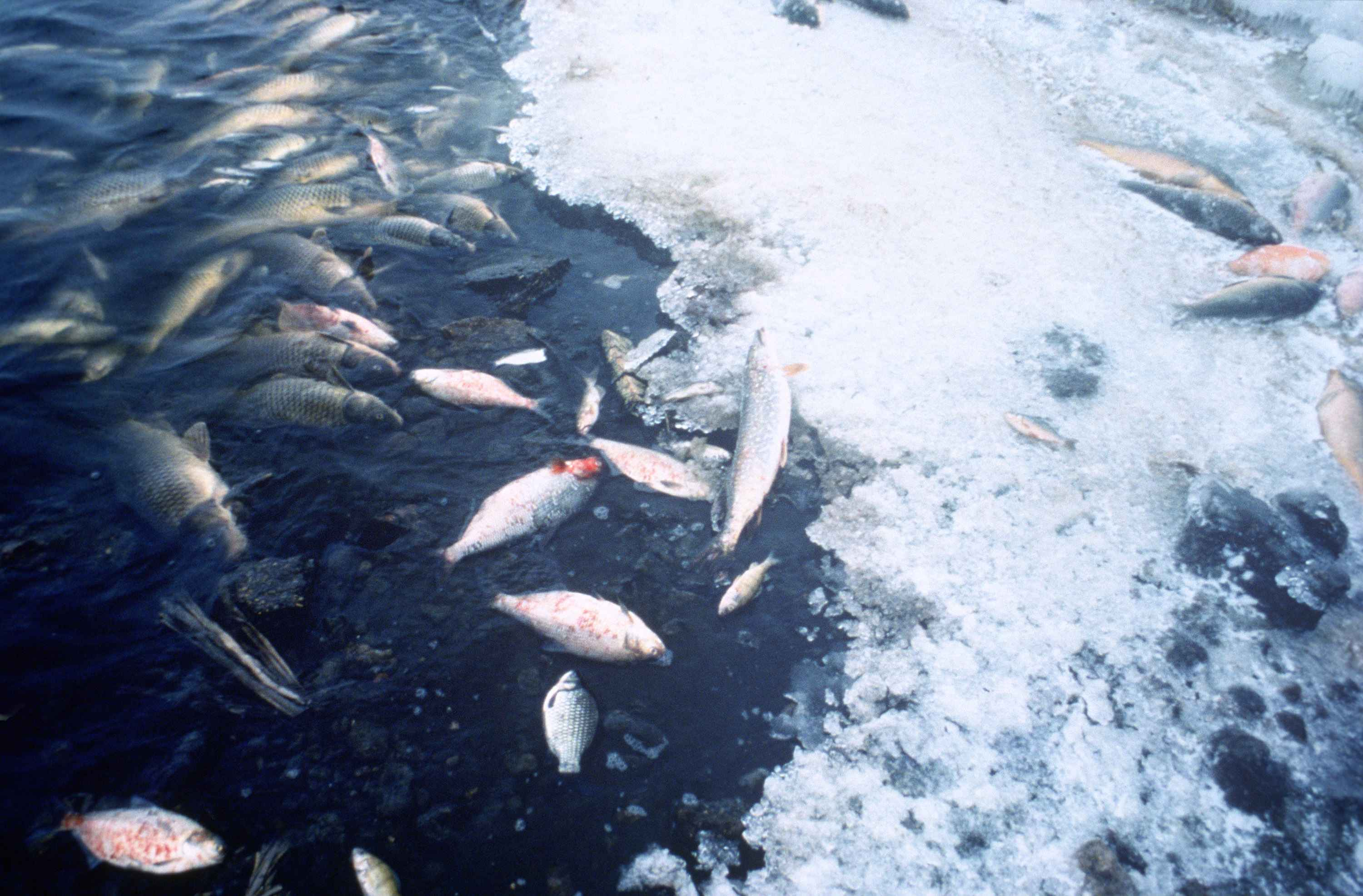
There are many causes of fish kill, but oxygen depletion is the most common cause. A winterkill is shown.

The term fish kill, also known as fish die-off, refers to a localized mass die-off of fish populations in a body of water, which may also be associated with more generalized mortality of aquatic life. The most common cause is anoxia in the water, which in turn may be due to factors such as drought, harmful algal bloom, overpopulation, or a sustained increase in water temperature. Infectious diseases and parasites can also lead to fish kill. Toxicity is a real but far less common cause of fish kill, and is often associated with man-made water pollution.

Fish kills are often the first visible signs of environmental stress and are usually investigated as a matter of urgency by environmental agencies to determine the cause of the kill. Many fish species have a relatively low tolerance of variations in environmental conditions and their death is often a potent indicator of problems in their environment that may be affecting other animals and plants and may have a direct impact on other uses of the water such as for drinking water production. Pollution events may affect fish species and fish age classes in different ways. If it is a cold-related fish kill, juvenile fish or species that are not cold-tolerant may be selectively affected. If toxicity is the cause, species are more generally affected and the event may include amphibians and shellfish as well. A reduction in dissolved oxygen may affect larger specimens more than smaller fish as these may be able to access oxygen richer water at the surface, at least for a short time.

== Causes ==
Depleted oxygen levels are the most common cause of fish kills. In this way eutrophication can have devastating consequences for the health of benthic life

Fish kills may result from a variety of causes. Of known causes, fish kills are most frequently caused by pollution from agricultural runoff or biotoxins. Ecological hypoxia (oxygen depletion) is one of the most common natural causes of fish kills. The suffocating event may be brought on by factors such as algae blooms, droughts, high temperatures and thermal pollution. Fish kills may also occur due to the presence of disease, agricultural runoff, sewage discharges, oil or hazardous waste spills, hydraulic fracturing wastewater, sea-quakes, inappropriate re-stocking of fish, poaching with chemicals, underwater explosions, and other catastrophic events that upset a normally stable aquatic population. Because of the difficulty and lack of standard protocol to investigate fish kills, many fish kill cases are designated as having an unknown cause.

=== Oxygen depletion ===
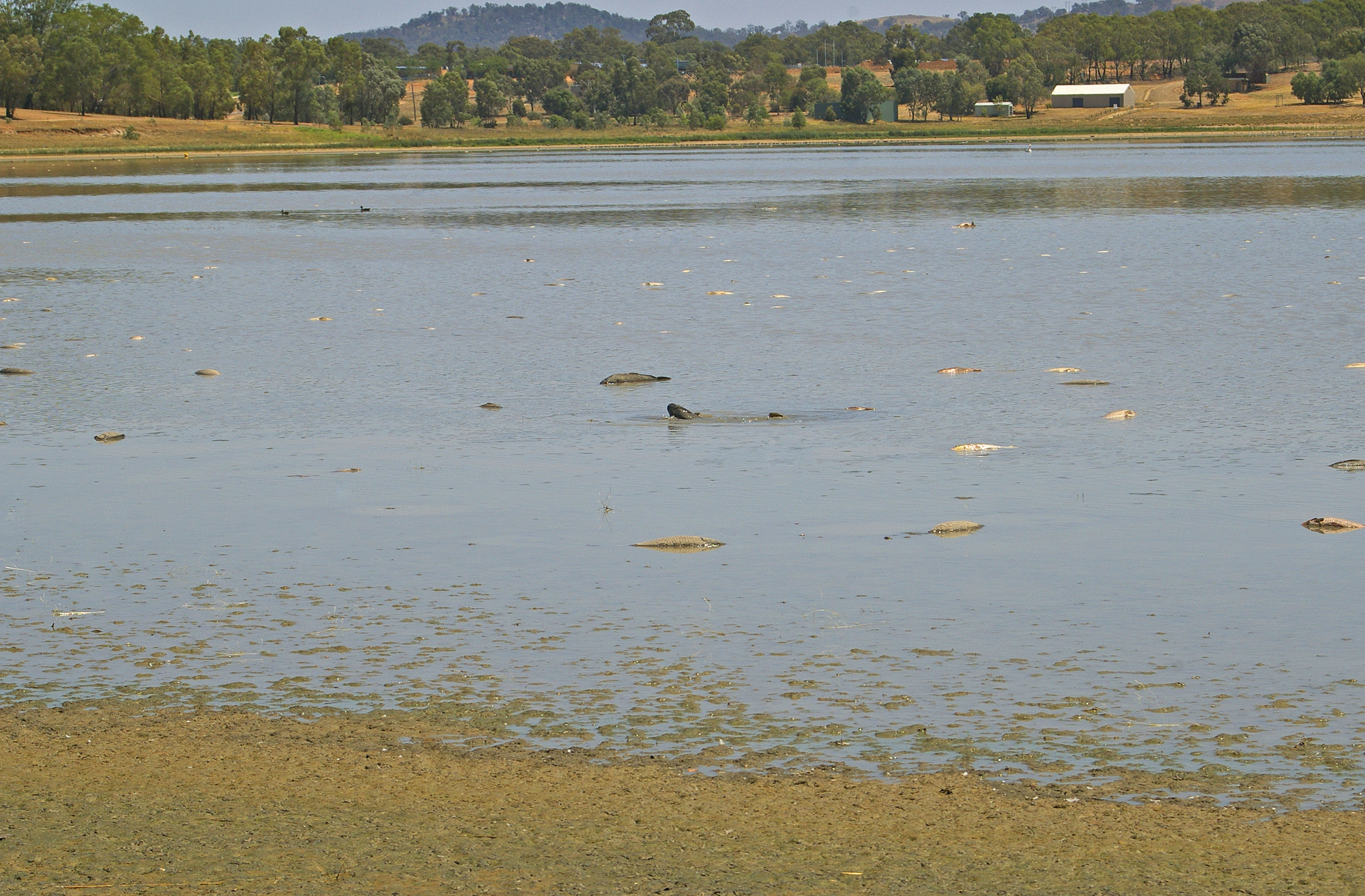
Dead and dying European carp in Lake Albert. Fish kills are often a sign of environmental stress.

Oxygen enters the water through diffusion. The amount of oxygen that can be dissolved in water depends on the atmospheric pressure, the water temperature and whether the water is salty. For example, at 20 °C (68 °F) and one atmosphere of pressure, a maximum of 8 mg/L of oxygen can dissolve in sea water (35 mg/L salinity) while a maximum of 9 mg/L of oxygen can dissolve in fresh water. The amount of oxygen that can be dissolved in the water decreases by about 1 mg/L for each 10 °C increase in water temperature above 20 °C.

Many cold water fish that live in clean cold waters become stressed when oxygen concentrations fall below 8 mg/L while warm water fish generally need at least 5 ppm (5 mg/L) of dissolved oxygen. Fish can endure short periods of reduced oxygen. Depleted oxygen levels are the most common cause of fish kills. Oxygen levels normally fluctuate even over the course of a day and are affected by weather, temperature, the amount of sunlight available, and the amount of living and dead plant and animal matter in the water. In temperate zones oxygen levels in eutrophic rivers in summertime can exhibit very large diurnal fluctuations with many hours of oxygen supersaturation during daylight followed by oxygen depletion at night. Associated with these photosynthetic rhythms there is a matching pH rhythm as bicarbonate ion is metabolised by plant cells. This can lead to pH stress even when oxygen levels are high.

Additional dissolved organic loads are the most common cause of oxygen depletion and such organic loads may come from sewage, farm waste, tip/landfill leachate and many other sources.

=== Diseases and parasites ===
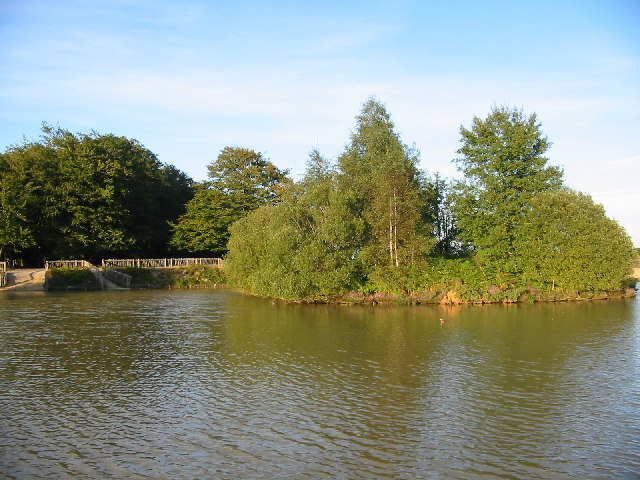
This pond in New Forest, England, has been restored following a viral infection which killed all the fish.

Fish are subject to various viruses, bacteria and fungi in addition to parasites such as protozoans, flukes and worms, or crustaceans. These are naturally occurring in many bodies of water, and fish that are stressed for other reasons, such as spawning or suboptimal water quality, are more susceptible. Signs of disease include sores, missing scales or lack of slime, strange growths or visible parasites, and abnormal behavior–lazy, erratic, gasping at the water surface or floating head, tail or belly up.

For example, since 2004 fish kills have been observed in the Shenandoah River basin in the spring, from the time water temperatures are in the 50s (°F) until they reach the mid-70s. So far, investigators suspect certain bacteria, along with environmental and contaminant factors that may cause immune suppression.

In fish farming, where populations are optimized for the available resources, parasites or disease can spread quickly. In channel catfish aquaculture ponds, for example, the "hamburger gill disease" is caused by a protozoan called Aurantiactinomyxon and can kill all the fish in an affected pond. In addition to altered behavior, affected fish have swollen gills that are mottled and have the appearance of ground hamburger meat.

Some early warning signs of fish suffering from disease or parasite infections include:

1. Discolouration, open sores, reddening of the skin, bleeding, black or white spots on the skin
2. Abnormal shape, swollen areas, abnormal lumps, or popeyes
3. Abnormal distribution of the fish such as crowding at the surface, inlet, or pond edges (though crowding at the surface during specific times of day, such as early morning, is more likely a sign of low oxygen)
4. Abnormal activity such as flashing, twisting, whirling, convulsions, loss of buoyancy
5. Listlessness, weakness, sluggishness, lack of activity
6. Loss of appetite or refusal to feed.

=== Toxins ===
Agricultural runoff, sewage, surface runoff, chemical spills and hazardous waste spills can all potentially lead to water toxicity and fish kill. Some algae species also produce toxins. In Florida, these include Aphanizomenon, Anabaena and Microcystis. Some notable fish kills in Louisiana in the 1950s were due to a pesticide called endrin. Natural instances of toxic conditions can occur, especially in poorly buffered water. Aluminium compounds can cause complete fish kills, sometimes associated with autumn turn-over of lakes leading to complex chemical interactions between pH, calcium ions and complex polymeric salts of aluminium.

Human-induced fish kills are unusual, but occasionally a spilled substance causes direct toxicity or a shift in water temperature or pH that can lead to fish kill. For example, in 1997 a phosphate plant in Mulberry, Florida, accidentally dumped 60 million US gal (0.23 million kl) of acidic process water into Skinned Sapling Creek, reducing the pH from about 8 to less than 4 along 36 miles (58 km) of creek, resulting in the death of about 1.3 million fish.

It is often difficult or impossible to determine whether a potential toxin is the direct cause of a fish kill. For example, hundreds of thousands of fish died after an accidental spill of bourbon whiskey into the Kentucky River near Lawrenceburg. However, officials could not determine whether the fish kill was due to the bourbon directly or to oxygen depletion that resulted when aquatic microbes rapidly began to consume and digest the liquor.

Cyanide is a particular toxic compound that has been used to poach fish. In cyanide poisoning the gills turn a distinctive cherry red. Chlorine introduced as alkaline hypochlorite solution is also extremely toxic, leaving pale mucilaginous gills and an over-production of mucilage across the whole body. Lime produces similar symptoms but is also often associated with milk eyes.

=== Algae blooms and red tides ===
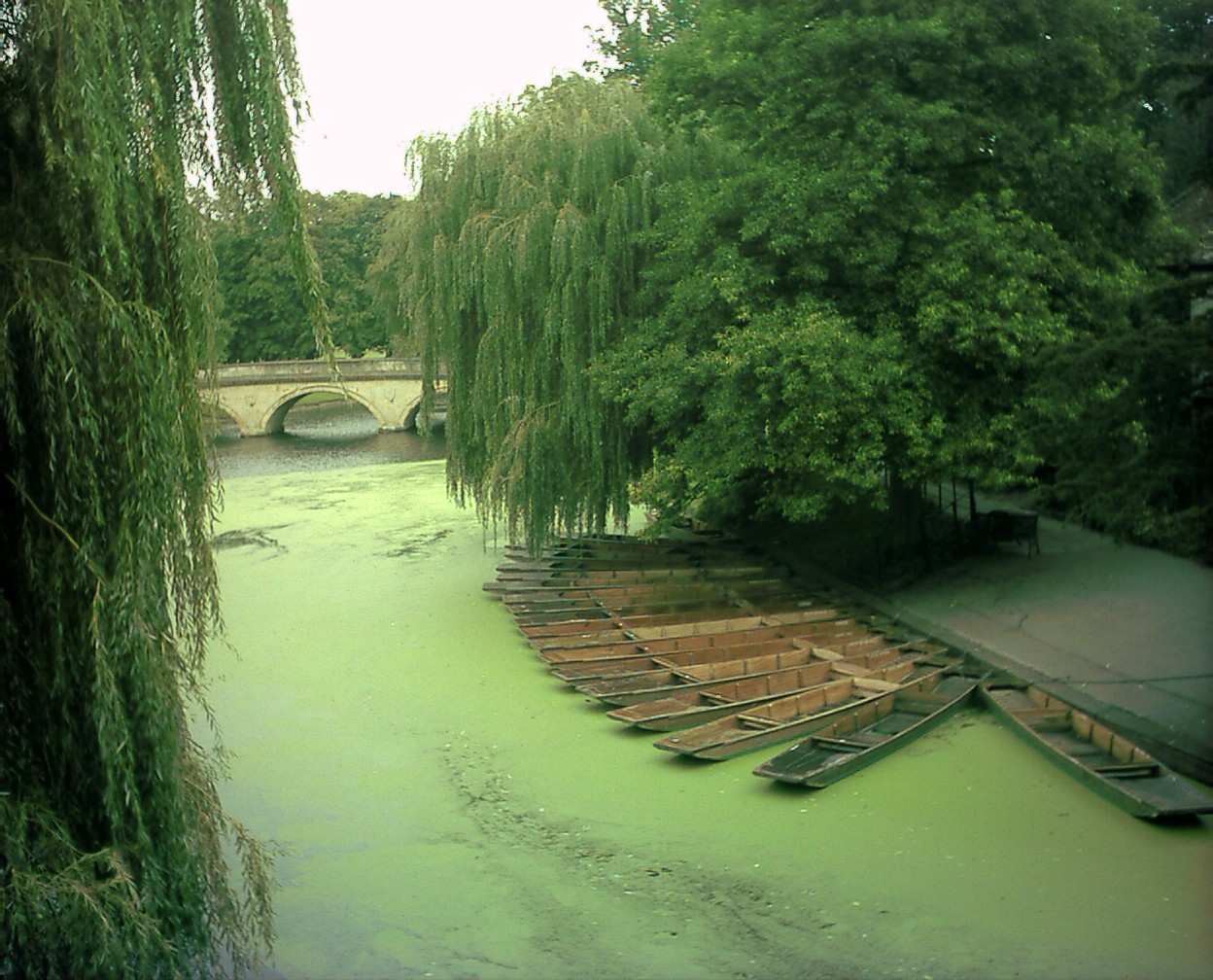
A small algae bloom on River Cam near Trinity College

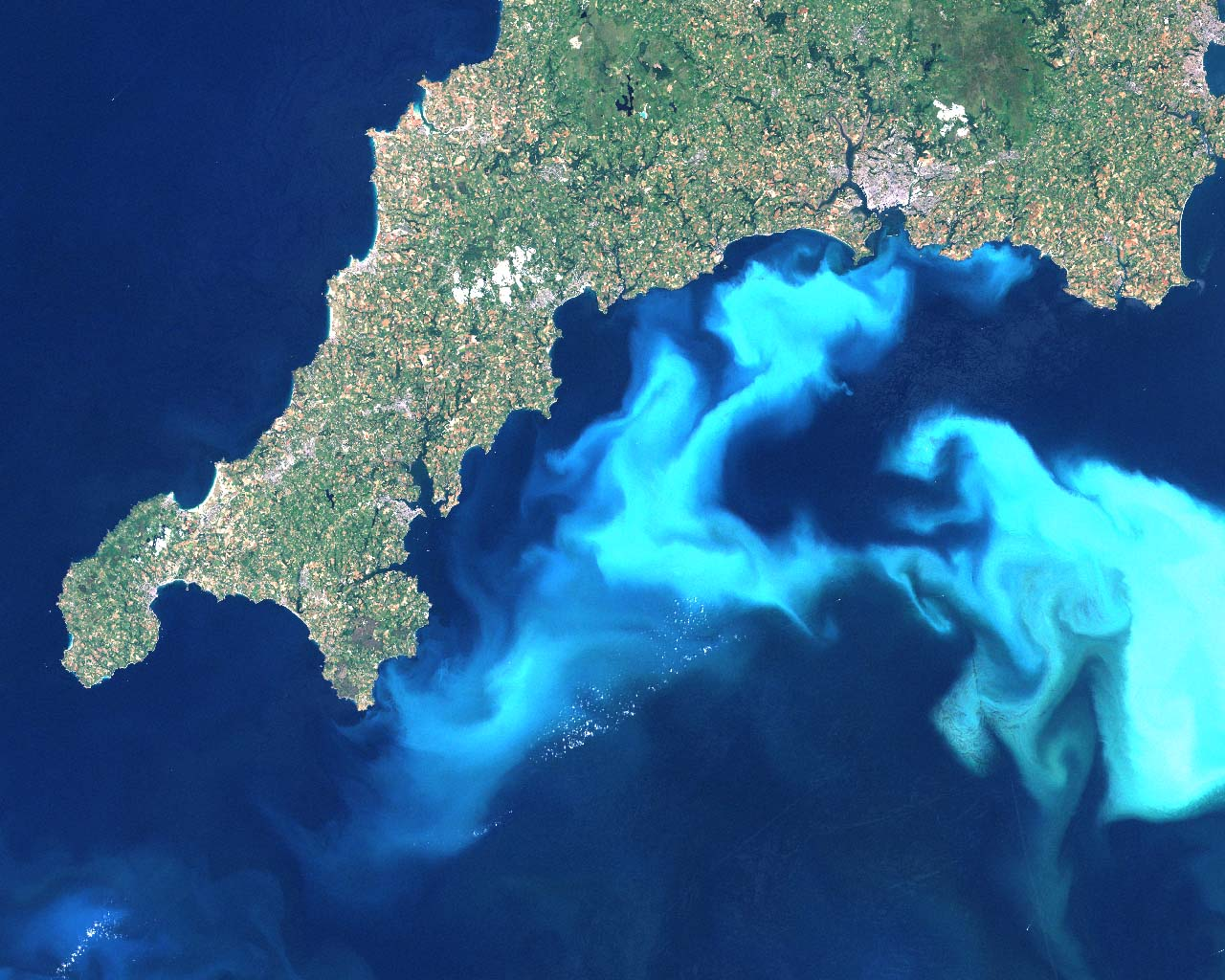
A large algae bloom off the southern coast of England in 1999

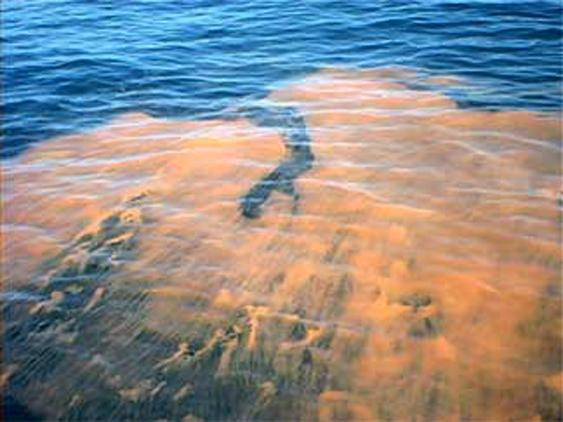
Red tide is a reddish algae bloom caused by a microorganism common in the Gulf of Mexico

An algae bloom is the appearance of a large amount of algae or scum floating on the surface of a body of water. Algae blooms are a natural occurrence in nutrient-rich lakes and rivers, though sometimes increased nutrient levels leading to algae blooms are due to fertilizer or animal waste runoff. A few species of algae produce toxins, but most fish kills due to algae bloom are a result of decreased oxygen levels. When the algae die, decomposition uses oxygen in the water that would be available to fish. A fish kill in a lake in Estonia in 2002 was attributed to a combination of algae bloom and high temperatures. When people manage algae blooms in fish ponds, it is recommended that treatments be staggered to avoid too much algae dying at once, which may result in a large drop in oxygen content.

Some diseases result in mass die-offs. One of the more bizarre and recently discovered diseases produces huge fish kills in shallow marine waters. It is caused by the ambush predator dinoflagellate Pfiesteria piscicida. When large numbers of fish, like shoaling forage fish, are in confined situations such as shallow bays, the excretions from the fish encourage this dinoflagellate, which is not normally toxic, to produce free-swimming zoospores. If the fish remain in the area, continuing to provide nourishment, then the zoospores start secreting a neurotoxin. This toxin results in the fish developing bleeding lesions, and their skin flakes off in the water. The dinoflagellates then eat the blood and flakes of tissue while the affected fish die. Fish kills by this dinoflagellate are common, and they may also have been responsible for kills in the past which were thought to have had other causes. Kills like these can be viewed as natural mechanisms for regulating the population of exceptionally abundant fish. The rate at which the kills occur increases as organically polluted land runoff increases.

Red tide is the name commonly given to an algal bloom of Karenia brevis, a microscopic marine dinoflagellate which is common in Gulf of Mexico waters. In high concentrations it discolors the water which often appears reddish-brown in color. It produces a toxin which paralyses the central nervous system of fish so they cannot breathe. Dead fish wash up on beaches around Texas and Florida. Humans can also become seriously ill from eating oysters and other shellfish contaminated with the red tide toxin. The term "red tide" is also commonly used to describe harmful algal blooms on the northern east coast of the United States, particularly in the Gulf of Maine. This type of bloom is caused by another species of dinoflagellate known as Alexandrium fundyense. These blooms are natural phenomena, but the exact combination of factors that result in red tide outbreaks is not fully understood.

=== Biological decay ===
Just as an algae bloom can lead to oxygen depletion, introduction of a large amount of decaying biological material in general to a body of water leads to oxygen depletion as microorganisms use up available oxygen in the process of breaking down organic matter. For example, a 10 miles (16 km) fish kill in September, 2010, in the Sangamon River in Illinois was traced to discharge of animal waste into the river from a large dairy operation. The illegal discharge resulted in a complete kill of fish, frogs, mussels and mudpuppies.

=== Nutrient pollution and eutrophication ===
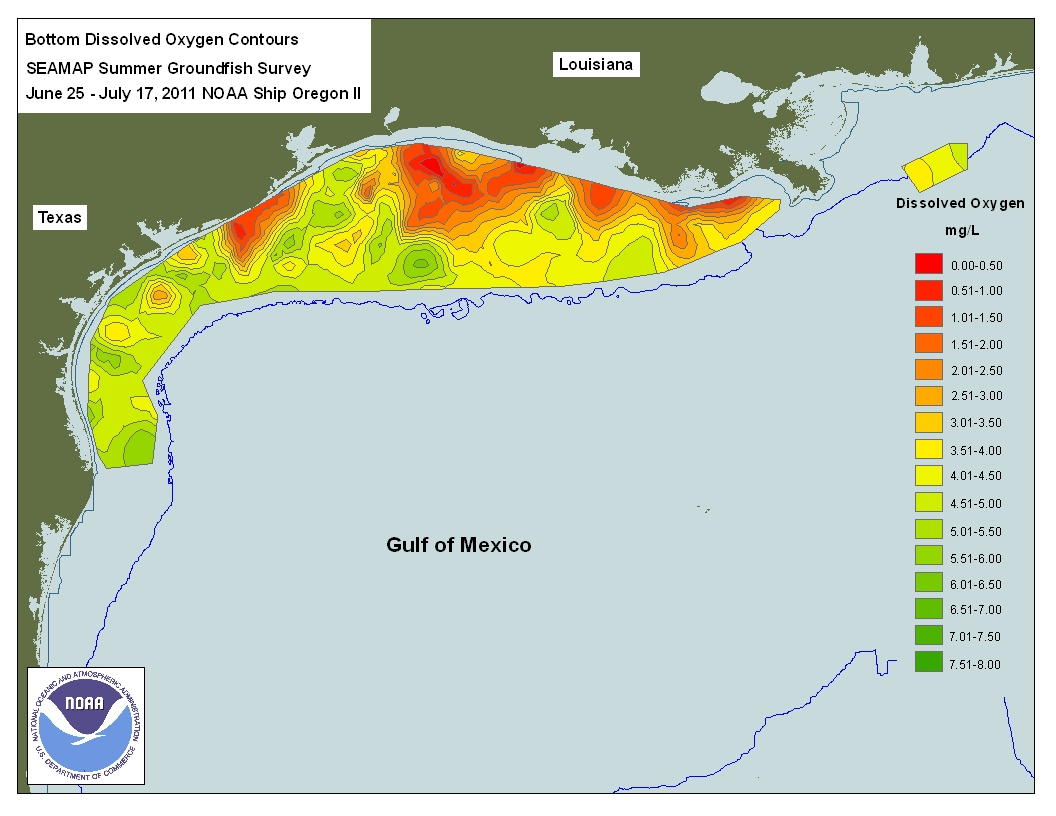
Map of the dead zone in the Gulf of Mexico

Excessive anthropogenic nutrient enrichment of phosphorus and nitrogen allow for rapid growth and multiplication of phytoplankton in the Mississippi River. As phytoplankton continue to rapidly grow under optimal conditions, their biomass is almost doubled every 24 hours. In the water, higher concentrations of organic matter are present because of the high reproductive rate of the phytoplankton over a short period of time. The rapid growth of phytoplankton causes turbidity in the waters of the Mississippi and the Gulf of Mexico. Turbidity is defined as the measure of water clarity by how much the suspended material, such as algae and phytoplankton, constrict the passage of sunlight through water. Hence, as phytoplankton begin to multiply more rapidly, turbidity in the river and gulf increases. The increasing turbidity blocks plants from absorbing sunlight. The process of turbidity results in limited photosynthesis production, and sometimes even death from sunlight deprivation of the submerged aquatic vegetation that are affected by the opaque turbid water accumulating at the surface.

Furthermore, a significant detrimental outcome caused by eutrophication in the Mississippi River is the increased uptake of dissolved oxygen by bacteria, in response to higher concentrations of organic matter. After eutrophication starts and is in progress, the phytoplankton reach their maximum population density and begin to die. As the dead phytoplankton accumulate, detritus, or organic matter waste, forms at the surface along with other bacteria and algae. As more phytoplankton die, the higher the concentration of organic matter becomes; and with a higher concentration of organic matter, more bacteria will reproduce.

Consequently, as more bacteria, phytoplankton, and algae exponentially grow and multiply, the more submerged aquatic vegetation die, because they do not have access to sunlight due to eutrophication. Once this snowball-like course of action is in full motion, a dead zone has been created. As a result of the excess nutrient enrichment in the Mississippi River, dead zones appear in the Gulf of Mexico, created from the process of eutrophication. The dead zones in the gulf are mainly created by the nitrogen and phosphorus enrichment of the Lower Mississippi River.

=== Spawning fatalities ===
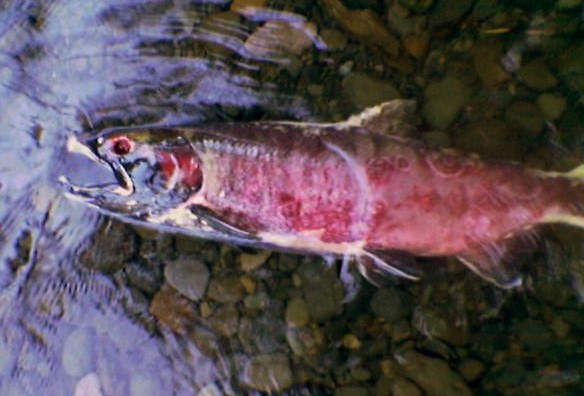
A salmon which has died after spawning

Some species of fish exhibit mass simultaneous mortality as part of their natural life cycle. Fish kill due to spawning fatalities can occur when fish are exhausted from spawning activities such as courtship, nest building, and the release of eggs or milt (sperm). Fish are generally weaker after spawning and are less resilient than usual to smaller changes in the environment. Examples include the Atlantic salmon and the Sockeye salmon where many of the females routinely die immediately after spawning.

=== Water temperature ===
A fish kill can occur with rapid fluctuations in temperature or sustained high temperatures. Generally, cooler water has the potential to hold more oxygen, so a period of sustained high temperatures can lead to decreased dissolved oxygen in a body of water. An August 2010 fish kill in Delaware Bay was attributed to low oxygen as a result of high temperatures. A massive (hundreds of thousands) fish kill at the mouth of the Mississippi River in Louisiana, September, 2010, was attributed to a combination of high temperatures and low tide. Such kills are known to happen in this region in late summer and early fall, but this one was unusually large. The Division of Wildlife stated that the fish kill was unrelated to the oil spill that had recently occurred in the Gulf of Mexico.

A short period of hot weather can increase temperatures in the surface layer of water, as the warmer water tends to stay near the surface and be further heated by the air. In this case, the top warmer layer may have more oxygen than the lower, cooler layers because it has constant access to atmospheric oxygen. If a heavy wind or cold rain then occurs (usually during the autumn but sometimes in summer), the layers can mix. If the volume of low oxygen water is much greater than the volume in the warm surface layer, this mixing can reduce oxygen levels throughout the water column and lead to fish kill.

Fish kills can also result from a dramatic or prolonged drop in air (and thus, water) temperature. This kind of fish kill is selective – usually the dead fish are species that cannot tolerate cold. This has been observed in cases where a fish native to a more tropical region has been introduced to cooler waters, such as the introduction of the tilapia to bodies of water in Florida. Native to Africa's Nile River, the tilapia stop feeding when water temperatures drop below 60 °F (16 °C) and die when it reaches 45 °F (7 °C). Thus, tilapia that have survived and successfully reproduced in Florida are occasionally killed by a winter cold front.

In January 2011, a selective fish kill affecting an estimated 2 million juvenile spot fish in Maryland was attributed to a combination of cold stress and overpopulation after a particularly large spawn.

"Hundreds of thousands" of fish were found dead in Texas in June 2023 due to warming water.

=== Underwater explosions ===
Underwater explosions can lead to fish kills, and fish with swim bladders are more susceptible. Sometimes underwater explosions are used on purpose to induce fish kills, a generally illegal practice known as blast fishing. Underwater explosions may be accidental or planned, such as for construction, seismic testing, mining or blast testing of structures under water. In many places, an assessment of potential effects of underwater explosions on marine life must be completed and preventive measures taken before blasting.

=== Droughts and overstocking ===
Droughts and overstocking can also result in inland fish kills.

A drought can lead to lower water volumes so that even if the water contains a high level of dissolved oxygen, the reduced volume may not be enough for the fish population. Droughts often occur in conjunction with high temperatures so that the oxygen carrying capacity of the water may also be reduced. Low river flows also reduce the available dilution for permitted discharges of treated sewage or industrial waste. The reduced dilution increases the organic demand for oxygen further reducing the oxygen concentration available to fish

Overstocking of fish (or an unusually large spawn) can also result in inland fish kills. Fish kill due to insufficient oxygen is really a matter of too much demand and too little supply for whatever reason(s). Recommended stocking densities are available from many sources for bodies of water ranging from a home aquarium or backyard pond to commercial aquaculture facilities.

== Estimation ==
Estimating the magnitude of a kill presents a number of problems.

1. Polluted waters are often very turbid or have low transparency making it difficult or impossible to see fish that have sunk.
2. Rivers and streams can move fish downstream out of the investigation area.
3. Small fish and fry can decompose or become buried in sediments very quickly and are lost from the count.
4. Predators and scavengers remove and eat fish.
5. Stressed fish may swim up tributaries and die there.
6. Many kills are reported only when dead fish resurface due to decompositional gas formation, often several hours after the kill has occurred.

Some very large fish kills may never be estimated because of these factors. For example, the 2010 Ajka alumina plant accident, which discharged roughly one million cubic meters of red mud from a reservoir in Hungary into the Marcal River, is acknowledged to have caused environmental devastation, but due to the high turbidity and sediment load of the polluted waters, as well as the large geographic extent of the event, the magnitude of the fish kill was not determined.

== Prevention and investigation ==
Fish kills are difficult to predict. Even when conditions that contribute to fish kills are known to exist, prevention is hard because often conditions cannot be improved and fish cannot be safely removed in time. In small ponds, mechanical aeration and/or removal of decaying matter (such as fallen leaves or dead algae) may be reasonable and effective preventive measures.

Many countries in the developed world have specific provisions in place to encourage the public to report fish kills so that a proper investigation can take place. Investigation of the cause of a kill requires a multi-disciplinary approach including on-site environmental measurements, investigation of inputs, review of meteorology and past history, toxicology, fish autopsy, invertebrate analysis and a robust knowledge of the area and its problems.

== Notable events ==
The counts given below are all estimates. They tend to be underestimates, and may omit, for example, small fish, those removed by scavengers and those that settle to the bottom.

Event/Location	Date	Count	Species	Remarks
Gulf of Mexico (Corpus Christi)	1935	22,000,000		Caused by red tide. This event caused coughing, sneezing and watery red eyes in humans.
River Aeron	1974	10,000	salmon, trout	Discharge of creamery waste through poorly maintained sewer. Successful prosecution followed.
River Neath	1976	50,000	salmon, trout	Extreme drought left fish stranded in stagnant pools into which sewers drained.
River Ogmore	1979	50,000	salmon, trout	Spillage of Kymene from a paper mill on the River Llynfi a tributary of the Ogmore. Successful prosecution followed and substantial compensation.
Gulf of Mexico	1986	22,000,000	Gulf menhaden, striped mullet, various other species	Caused by red tide.
Rhine River	1986 01	500,000		Caused by spill from Swiss chemical warehouse
Texas coast	1997–1998	21,000,000		Caused by a bloom of Karenia brevis
White River; West Fork, Indiana	1999	4,800,000		Caused by an automotive parts maker in Anderson, Indiana, which had discharged 10,000 gallons of the chemical HMP 2000 into the river.
River Dee (United Kingdom)	2000 07	100,000	salmon, trout, perch	Unconfirmed link to release of whey into river
Klamath River	2002 09	70,000	salmon	Low flow of water due to drought and water diversions for agriculture led to heated and shallow water, increasing vulnerability to a gill disease.
Neuse River, North Carolina	2004 09	1,900,000	menhaden	"Natural upwelling" of an acknowledged polluted river. Hydrogen sulfide smell reported
Taal Lake, Luzon, Philippines	2008 01 05	50 metric tons	tilapia	May be linked to volcanic activity and large fish farms
Liuxihe River Guangzhou People's Republic of China	2008 09 09	10,000	carp	Unknown
Beaches at Thanet, Kent, England	2010 01	20,000	velvet crab	20000 + dead crabs – along with dead starfish, lobsters, sponges and anemones. Probably killed by hypothermia.
Ting River Fujian People's Republic of China	2010 07	>1,000,000 Enough to feed 70,000 people a year		Part of the Zijin mining disaster
Mississippi River; Plaquemines Parish, Louisiana	2010 09	100,000	redfish, trout, flounder	
Arkansas River; Ozark, Arkansas	2010 12	100,000	freshwater drum	Coincided with death of 5,000 red-winged blackbirds that fell from the sky.
Chesapeake Bay	2011 01	2,000,000	spot croakers	Included some juvenile croakers. Cold water stress was believed to be the cause.
Jiaxing Xiuzhou District People's Republic of China	2011 01 06	250,000	bream, carp, murrel, silver carp, grass carp	Fish caught and transported to market held in large fish tanks fed with river water. Very rapid die-off and loss exceeded 100 tonnes. Only fish caught from a river under China National Highway 320 east died.
Redondo Beach, California	2011 03	millions	anchovies, mackerel, sardines and other small fish	Caused by oxygen deprivation
Taal Lake, Batangas, Philippines	2011 05 29	750 metric tons	Tilapia, milkfish	Caused by oxygen deprivation and large fish farms
Lingayen Gulf, Anda, Pangasinan, Philippines	2011 05 30	500 metric tons	Milkfish	Oxygen depletion and change of water climate
Nordreisa, Troms, Norway	2011 12 31	several tons	herring	
Guangxi, People's Republic of China	2012 01 15	40 metric tons	Various	Caused by 2012 Guangxi cadmium spill
Menindee Lakes, NSW, Australia	2018 12	1,000,000	Murray cod, silver perch, golden perch, bony herring, carp	An independent assessment found that three significant fish death events were primarily caused by local hydrological and climatic conditions, shaped by a broader climatic, hydrologic and basin management context that placed the lower Darling River at risk of such fish deaths. The immediate cause was oxygen depletion when the weir pool destratified.
Oder river, Poland	2022	10+ metric tons	various: zander, catfish, gudgeon, loach, chub, etc.	2022 Oder environmental disaster
Menindee, NSW, Australia	2023 03 17	Millions	Mostly bony herring	Oxygen depletion
Brazoria County, Texas, USA	2023 06 13	Tens of thousands		Oxygen depletion

== See also ==
- Aquatic biomonitoring
- Bird kill
- Fish-kill tree
- Harmful algal bloom
- Mass mortality event
- Paramoebiasis
- Roadkill
- Sentinel species
