= Liuxihe Dam =

- Location within China
- Country: China
- Location: Conghua, Guangzhou, Guangdong Province
- Coordinates: 23°44′59″N 113°46′10″E
- Status: In use
- Construction began: 1956
- Opening date: 1958

Dam and spillways
- Type of dam: Arch
- Impounds: Liuxi River
- Height: 78 metres (256 ft)
- Length: 255.5 metres (838 ft)
- Width (crest): 2 metres (7 ft)
- Width (base): 22 metres (72 ft)
- Dam volume: 130,000 cubic metres (4,590,907 ft^{3})
- Spillways: Two
- Spillway type: Seven controlled surface openings and discharge tunnel
- Spillway capacity: 987 cubic metres per second (34,856 cu ft/s); Tunnel: 1,070 cubic metres per second (37,787 cu ft/s)

Reservoir
- Creates: Liuxihe Reservoir
- Total capacity: 325,000,000 cubic metres (263,482 acre⋅ft)
- Catchment area: 539 square kilometres (208 sq mi)

Power Station
- Turbines: 4 x 12 MW
- Installed capacity: 48 MW
- Annual generation: 147 million kWh

The Liuxihe Dam is an arch dam on the Liuxi River in Conghua District, Guangzhou, Guangdong Province, China. The main purpose of the project is hydroelectric power generation with additional purposes of flood control and irrigation. The dam is 78 metres (256 ft) tall and was constructed between 1956 and 1958.

== Construction ==
In September 1955, planning for dams in the Liuxi River basin began and by January 1956, plans for the Liuxihe Dam were complete. In August 1956, construction on the dam began and excavation commenced the next month and continued until April 1957, removing 680,000 cubic metres (24,013,973 ft^{3}) of rock and material. The same month that excavation was complete, concrete placement began and continued until September 1958. Earlier in August, the first generator was placed online and the rest were operational by the end of 1958. Originally, the dam supported 4 × 10.5 MW generators but in 1993, they were upgraded to 12 MW each.

== Design ==
The dam is a 255.5 metres (838 ft) long and 78 metres (256 ft) high double-curvature arch dam with a crest width of 2 metres (7 ft) and base width of 22 metres (72 ft). The dam is composed of 130,000 cubic metres (4,590,907 ft^{3}) of concrete and contains seven openings on its surface to discharge water downstream. Each opening is 11.5 metres (38 ft) wide and 4 metres (13 ft) high with a discharge capacity of 141 cubic metres per second (4,979 cu ft/s) each. A 237 metres (778 ft) long discharge tunnel with a maximum capacity of 1,070 cubic metres per second (37,787 cu ft/s) is also built on the dam's right bank.

An axillary dam was built in conjunction with the project in order to protect low-lying areas from the reservoir. It is located about 2 kilometres (1 mi) northwest of the main dam and is an embankment type. The dam is 29.7 metres (97 ft) tall and 220 metres (722 ft) long while having a structural volume of 350,000 cubic metres (12,360,133 ft^{3}). After the completion of the Huanglongdai Dam in June 1975, the downstream side of the auxiliary dam is now the Huanglongdai Reservoir in which it now serves to regulate both.

== See also ==
- List of power stations in China
