= Avicide =

Substance used to kill birds

An avicide is any substance (normally a chemical) used to kill birds.

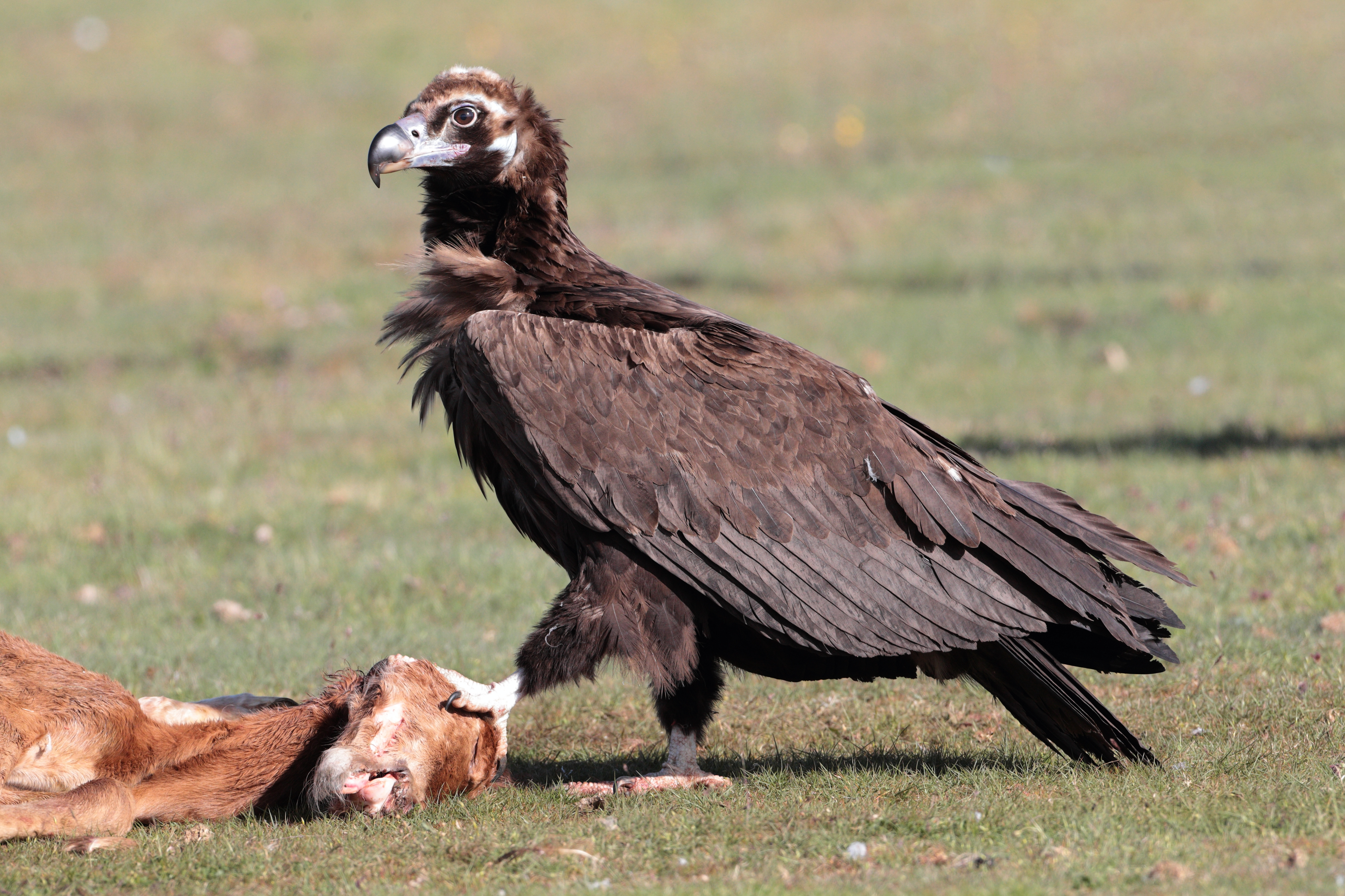
Birds of prey are the most affected because they are at the top of the food chain and toxins accumulate.

Commonly used avicides include strychnine (also used as rodenticide and predacide), DRC-1339 (3-chloro-4-methylaniline hydrochloride, Starlicide) and CPTH (3-chloro-p-toluidine, the free base of Starlicide), Avitrol (4-aminopyridine) and chloralose (also used as rodenticide). In the past, highly concentrated formulations of parathion in diesel oil were sprayed by aircraft over birds' nesting colonies.

Avicides are banned in many countries because of their ecological impact, which is poorly studied. They are still used in the United States, Canada, Australia and New Zealand. The practice is criticized by animal rights advocates and those who kill birds with guns and traps. Pigeon fanciers sometimes poison problematic birds of prey, even in countries like Russia and Ukraine where avicides are illegal.

== See also ==
- Bird kill
