= 2012 Guangxi cadmium spill =

Water contamination event in Guangxi, China

The 2012 Guangxi cadmium spill occurred in early January when toxic cadmium contaminated the Guangxi Longjiang river (龙江河) and water supply.

== Incident ==
Hechi authorities estimated that more than 40,000 kilograms of fish were found dead from January 15 to February 2 within the city limits. The spill was caused by Jinhe Mining company (沿河兩岸工廠). The spill is estimated to be 80 times the official limit, according to regional government protection official Feng Zhennian.

A toxic slick stretching more than 100km along the Longjiang river reached the Nuomitan hydroelectric station, 57 km upstream from Liuzhou, with cadmium levels five times above the national standard. In one month 20 tonnes of toxic cadmium metals were spilled into the river.

== Control ==
The government stopped supply of tap water to Liuzhou city, affecting 3.7 million residents. Seven company executives deemed responsible for the contamination were detained. Seven government officials were fired, including two punished for the spill. According to local government officials from the Xinhua News Agency, the pollution is under control after two weeks of cleanup. Shortly after the spill, residents of the city of Liuzhou emptied supermarkets of bottled water out of fear of contamination. Many scientists working on purification decided to return to the river, despite being hospitalized for contamination.

More than 60% of cadmium content in the Longjiang River in Hechi, previously reported as five times higher than the restricted level, has been diluted and absorbed, according to experts. Guangdong, Macau and Hong Kong are said to be unaffected. Chinese environmentalists are calling for a cadmium pollution fund to be set up to compensate for the long-term impact of the spill, according to state-run newspaper China Daily. "These kinds of disasters make it obvious that this is the time to change, to push for more transparency," says Ma Jun, a well-respected Chinese green activist and director of the Institute of Public & Environmental Affairs.

== See also ==
- Water pollution in China
- Fish kill
