= Chloralose =

- Structural formula of α-chloralose

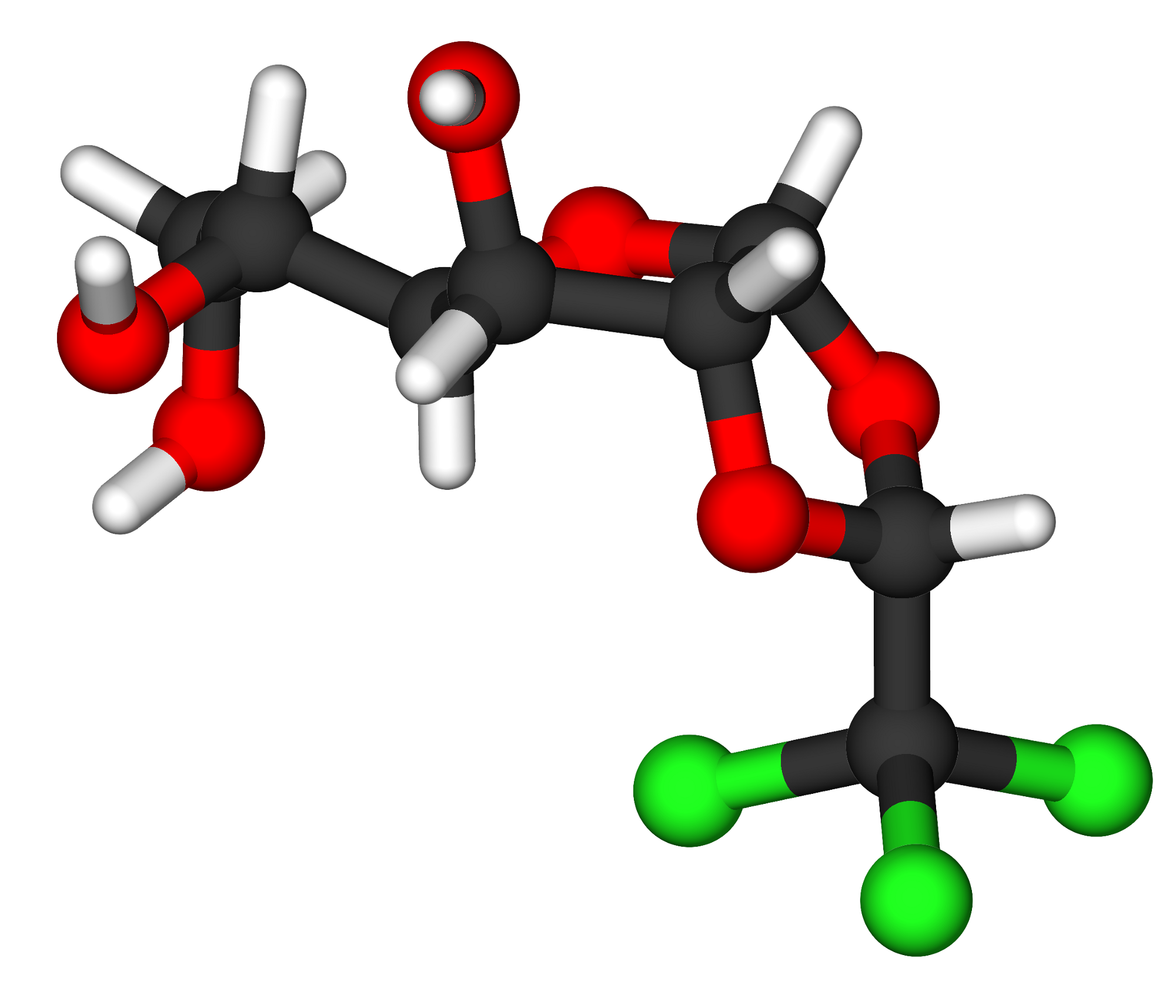
- Ball-and-stick model of α-chloralose

Names
- IUPAC name 1,2-O-[(1R)-2,2,2-Trichloroethane-1,1-diyl]-α-D-glucofuranose
- Systematic IUPAC name (1R)-1-[(2R,3aR,4S,5R,6aR)-2-(Trichloromethyl)-tetrahydro-2H-furo[2,3-d][1,3]dioxol-5-yl]ethane-1,2-diol

Identifiers
CAS Number	15879-93-3
3D model (JSmol)	Interactive image
Beilstein Reference	85418
ChEBI	CHEBI:81902
ChEMBL	ChEMBL2104181
ChemSpider	5414376
ECHA InfoCard	100.036.363
EC Number	240-016-7
KEGG	C18707
MeSH	Chloralose
PubChem CID	7057995; 40467114 (2R,3aR,5R,6R)-6-hydroxy-2-methyl-furo-5-yl; 27525 (2R,5R,6S,6aR)-6-hydroxy-2-methyl-furo-5-yl; 16211632 (1R)-dioxol, (2R,5R,6S,6aR)-6-hydroxy-2-methyl-furo-5-yl; 186624 (1R)-dioxol, (3aR,5R,6S,6aR)-6-hydroxy-furo-5-yl; 2723807 (2R,3aR,5R,6S,6aR)-6-hydroxy-2-methyl-furo-5-yl; 85991
RTECS number	FM9450000
UNII	238BZ29MUE
CompTox Dashboard (EPA)	DTXSID4020088
- InChI: InChI=1S/C8H11Cl3O6/c9-8(10,11)7-16-5-3(14)4(2(13)1-12)15-6(5)17-7/h2-7,12-14H,1H2/t2-,3+,4-,5-,6-,7-/m1/s1 Key: OJYGBLRPYBAHRT-IPQSZEQASA-N; InChI=1/C8H11Cl3O6/c9-8(10,11)7-16-5-3(14)4(2(13)1-12)15-6(5)17-7/h2-7,12-14H,1H2/t2-,3+,4-,5-,6-,7-/m1/s1 Key: OJYGBLRPYBAHRT-IPQSZEQABF
- SMILES: C([C@H]([C@@H]1[C@@H]([C@@H]2[C@H](O1)O[C@@H](O2)C(Cl)(Cl)Cl)O)O)O

Properties
Chemical formula	C_{8}H_{11}Cl_{3}O_{6}
Molar mass	309.52 g·mol^{−1}
Melting point	176 to 182 °C (349 to 360 °F; 449 to 455 K)

Hazards
- Occupational safety and health (OHS/OSH)
Main hazards	Harmful if swallowed Harmful if inhaled
- GHS labelling
Pictograms	(GHS06: Toxic) (GHS07: Exclamation mark) (GHS09: Environmental hazard)
Signal word	Danger
Hazard statements	H301, H332, H336, H410
Precautionary statements	P261, P264, P270, P271, P273, P301+P310, P304+P312, P304+P340, P312, P321, P330, P391, P403+P233, P405, P501

Related compounds
Related compounds	Chloral hydrate
- Except where otherwise noted, data are given for materials in their standard state (at 25 °C [77 °F], 100 kPa). verify (what is ?) Infobox references

Chloralose (also known as α-chloralose) is an avicide, and a rodenticide used to kill mice in temperatures below 15 °C. It is also widely used in neuroscience and veterinary medicine as an anesthetic and sedative. Either alone or in combination, such as with urethane, it is used for long-lasting, but light anesthesia. It has been used with oral administration to sedate wild Canada geese for translocation in Nevada.

Chemically, it is a chlorinated acetal derivative of glucose.

Chloralose exerts barbiturate-like actions on synaptic transmission in the brain, including potent effects at inhibitory γ-aminobutyric acid type A receptors (GABA_{A}R). A structural isomer of chloralose, β-chloralose (also called parachloralose in older literature), is inactive as a GABA_{A}R modulator and also as a general anesthetic.

Chloralose is often abused for its avicide properties. In the United Kingdom, protected birds of prey have been killed using the chemical. Legal use for bird control also often causes raptor mortalities from secondary poisoning, as well as primary poisoning of non-target species from eating bait, for example, kererū pigeon in New Zealand.
