= Oda (surname) =

Oda (written: 織田, 尾田 or 小田) is a Japanese surname. Notable people with the surname include:

- Nobuhide Oda (1510–1551), Japanese warlord and magistrate of lower Owari Province
- Nobunaga Oda (1534–1582), initiator of the unification of Japan under the shogunate
- Nobutada Oda (1557–1582), Japanese samurai, eldest son of Nobunaga Oda
- Nobukatsu Oda (1558–1630), Japanese samurai, second son of Nobunaga Oda
- Hidenobu Oda (1580–1605), son of Nobutada Oda
- Sakunosuke Oda (1913–1947), Japanese writer
- Ben Oda (1915–1984), Japanese-American comics letterer
- Bev Oda (born 1944), Canadian politician
- Chieko Oda (小田 千恵子; born 1947), Japanese gymnast
- Eiichirō Oda (born 1975), Japanese manga artist, author of One Piece
- Katsumi Oda (小田 勝美; born 1952), Japanese volleyball player
- Kazumasa Oda (born 1947), Japanese singer-songwriter and composer
- Kensaku Oda (小田 健作; 1888–1943), Japanese general
- Kiichi Oda (小田 喜一; 1913–1944), Japanese World War II flying ace
- Nobunari Oda (born 1987), Japanese figure skater
- Sakura Oda (born 1999), Japanese singer, member of Morning Musume
- Shigeru Oda (1924–2025), Japanese jurist, judge on the International Court of Justice from 1976 to 2003
- Sophie Tamiko Oda (born 1997), American actress
- Takuro Oda (小田 卓朗; born 1992), Japanese speed skater
- Tetsuji Oda, Japanese engineer
- Tetsurō Oda (born 1958), Japanese composer, record producer, and singer-songwriter
- Tokito Oda (born 2006), Japanese wheelchair tennis player
- Yūji Oda, (born 1967), Japanese actor and singer
- Yuka Oda (小田 由香; born 1973), Japanese ice hockey player
- Yūsei Oda, (born 1969), Japanese voice actor

== Fictional characters ==
- Nobuna Oda, the main female protagonist in The Ambition of Oda Nobuna
- Toshinori Oda, a character in Battle Royale
- Joseph Oda, a character from the video game The Evil Within
- Tatsumasa Oda, a character in Slam Dunk (manga)
- Sakunosuke Oda, a character in Bungo Stray Dogs

== See also ==
- Oda clan (Japanese: 織田家), a Japanese feudal clan from the Muromachi/Sengoku period
