= Datian =

Datian may refer to the following locations in China:

- Datian County (大田县), of Sanming, Fujian
- Datian Station (大田站), freight station of the Guangzhou–Zhuhai Railway in Baiyun District, Guangzhou, Guangdong
- Datian Subdistrict (临海市), in Linhai, Zhejiang
- Towns named Datian (大田镇)
  - Datian, Enping, in Enping, Guangdong
  - Datian, Dongfang, Hainan, in Dongfang, Hainan
  - Datian, Pingdu, in Pingdu, Shandong
  - Datian, Panzhihua, in Renhe District, Panzhihua, Sichuan
  - Datian, Tianjin, in Binhai New Area, Tianjin
- Datian Township (大田乡)
  - Datian Township, Taining County, in Taining County, Fujian
  - Datian Township, Qinglong County Guizhou, in Qinglong County, Guizhou
  - Datian Township, Gan County, in Gan County, Jiangxi
  - Datian Township, Hanyuan County, in Hanyuan County, Sichuan
  - Datian Township, Wuyi County, Zhejiang, in Wuyi County, Zhejiang

== See also ==
- Datianwan Stadium (大田湾体育场), a multi-use stadium in Chongqing, China
