= Guangzhou North–Shitan railway =

Railway line in Guangzhou, China

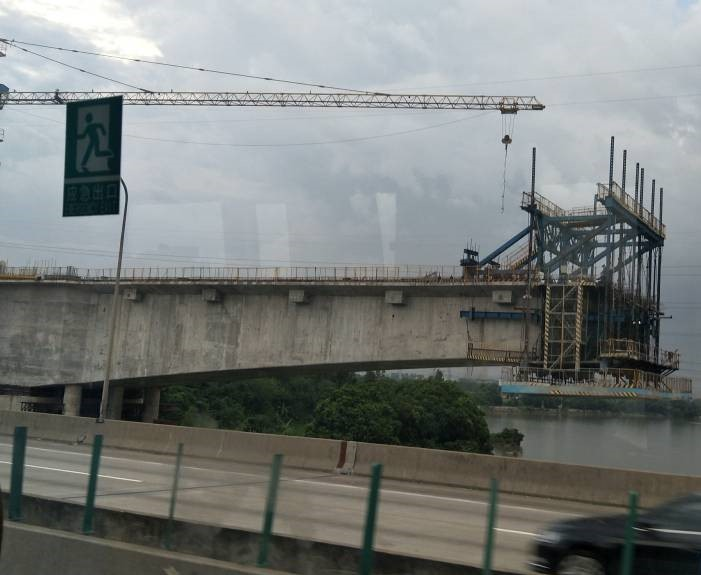
Construction of the Liuxi River Bridge

The Guangzhou North–Shitan railway or Guangshi line (Chinese: 广石线; pinyin: Guǎng-Shí xiàn) is a railway line for both passenger and fright services, in Guangzhou, Guangdong Province, China.

== Name ==
The railway is named after the abbreviation of its two terminals, Guangzhou North and Shitan.

== Route ==
The railway is 68.9 kilometres (42.8 mi) long and has a maximum speed of 120 kilometres per hour (75 mph). It starts at Guangzhou North railway station on the Beijing–Guangzhou railway and ends at a junction with the Guangzhou–Shenzhen railway. It allows freight trains to bypass the congested line through central Guangzhou and Guangzhou East stations.

== History ==
Construction began in December 2015. The line opened on 18 August 2020.
