= Guangzhou–Zhuhai railway =

Railway line in People's Republic of China

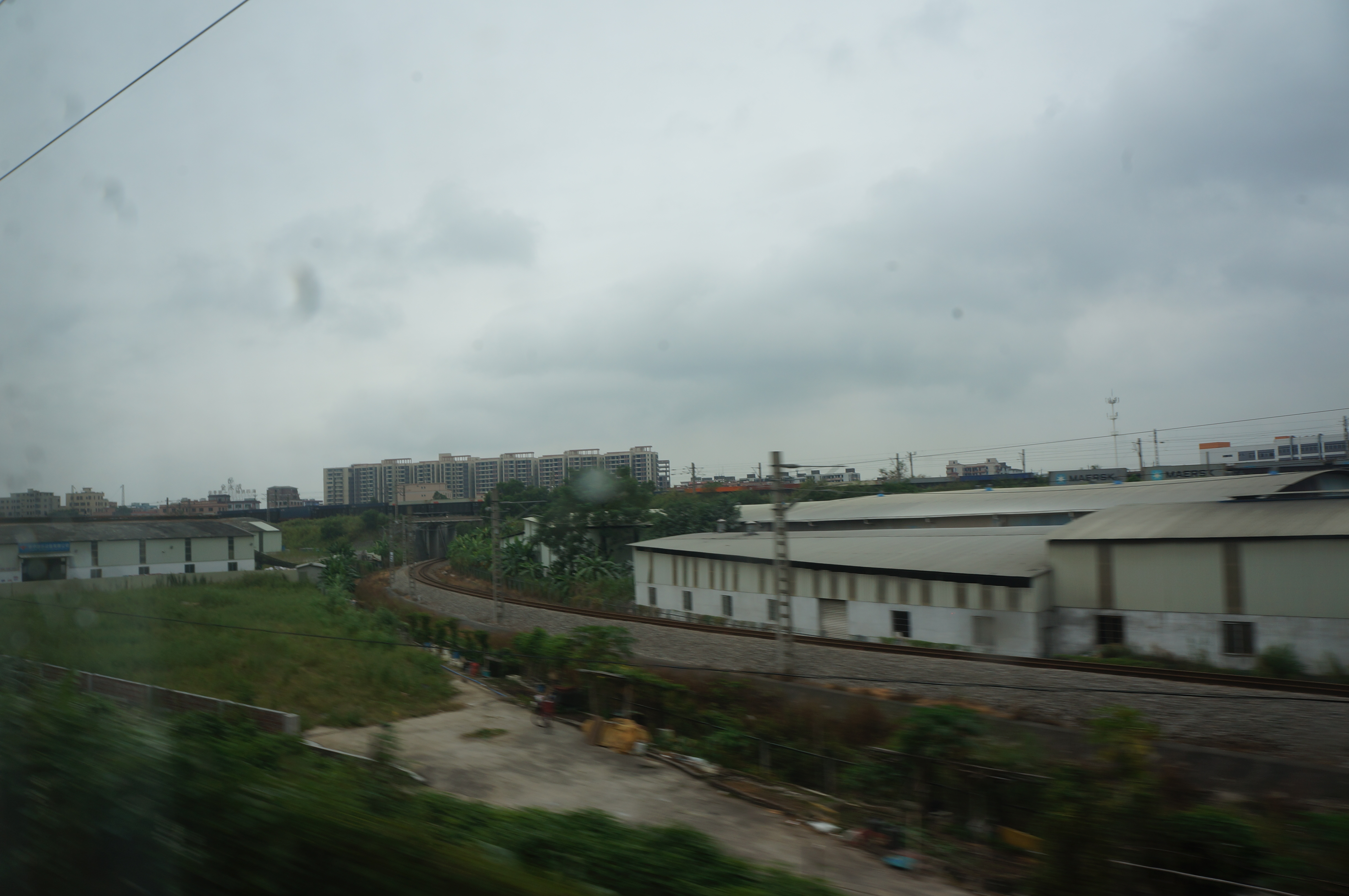
- Guangzhou–Zhuhai railway

Overview
- Status: Operational
- Termini: Jiangcun; Gaolan Port

Service
- Type: Heavy rail

History
- Opened: 29 December 2012

Technical
- Line length: 189 km (117 mi)
- Track gauge: 1,435 mm (4 ft 8 1/2 in) standard gauge
- Electrification: 50 Hz 25,000 V
- Operating speed: 120 km/h (75 mph)

Guangzhou–Zhuhai railway (Chinese: 广珠铁路) is a railway between Jiangcun (Chinese: 江村) in Guangzhou and Gaolan Port (Chinese: 高栏港) in Zhuhai, via the cities of Foshan and Jiangmen, in Guangdong, China. Opened at the end of 2012, it is currently used for freight only.

== Role ==
Until the 21st century, Zhuhai did not have any railway connections to the rest of the country. Now, however, there are two new railways there: besides the Guangzhou–Zhuhai railway for freight trains, the passenger-only Guangzhou–Zhuhai intercity railway started construction in 2005 and was to be completed in 2010. Since the intercity rail will take up the role of the passenger service between Guangzhou and Zhuhai/Jiangmen, this can explain why Guangzhou–Zhuhai railway will not be routed via Guangzhou City Area.

== History ==
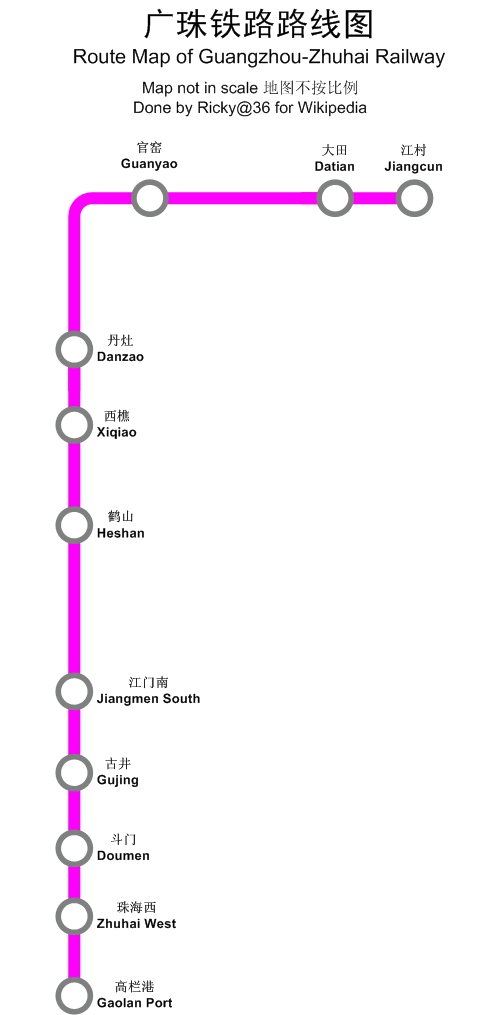

Map of 2012 Guangzhou-Zhuhai railway route

This railway project was approved by the State Development Planning Commission in 1993. The construction originally started in 1997, but it was stopped later due to lack of funds. Construction was resumed in 2007; at the time, it was expected to be completed in 2011. However, work did not proceeded as fast as expected; as of December 2011, it was reported that although most of the critical components of the project was completed, about 100 meters still remained at the Jiangmen tunnel (see below), and the Jiangbei Bridge was still under construction.

In mid-October 2012, it was reported that construction work had been essentially completed. The railway opened for freight traffic on December 30, 2012.

== Infrastructure ==
The line has a total length of 189 kilometres (117 mi) and a maximum speed of 120 kilometres per hour (75 mph). Between Jiangcun and Jiangmen, the line is double-track. From Jiangmen to Gaolan Port, the line is single-track. The entire line is electrified with provisions to allow for operating double-stack container trains.

=== Jiangmen tunnel ===
Constructing the railway involved digging a 9185-meter-long tunnel in Jiangmen. By May 2010, over half of the tunnel had been dug, and the entire tunnel was expected to be completed by the end of February 2011. However, as of December 2011, it was reported that about 100 meters of the tunnel still remained to be completed.

=== Stations ===
There are 13 stations on the route.

Guangzhou–Zhuhai railway stations
Station	Province	Codes		
Station	Province	TMIS	Telegraph	Pinyin
Jiangcun	Guangzhou	23483	JCQ	JCU
Datian	Guangzhou	23486	RQQ	DTI
Guanyao	Guangdong			
Shatoudong	Guangdong	23490	SDA	
Hengjiang Signal Box	Guangdong		HFA	
Danzao	Guangdong			
Jiangmenbei	Guangdong	23495	HZQ	JMB
Yayao Signal Box	Guangdong	23497	YYA	
Jiangmen	Guangdong	23498	JOQ	JME
Gujing	Guangdong	23501	GWQ	GJI
Doumen	Guangdong			
Zhuhaixi	Guangdong			
Gaolan'gang	Guangdong			

== Future ==
The railway is expected to carry passenger services in the future.

=== Nansha Port railway ===
A branch from Yayao railway station, the Nansha Port railway, will link the line with Nansha port and will also carry passengers to Nansha railway station.
