= Oda Station =

Oda Station, or Ōda Station is the name of four train stations in Japan:

- Ōda Station (Kumamoto) (網田駅)
- Ōda Station (Mie) (麻生田駅)
- Oda Station (Okayama) (小田駅)
- Oda Station (Shimane) (小田駅)
