= Liuxi River =

Coordinates: 23°33′48″N 113°36′16″E

Liuxi
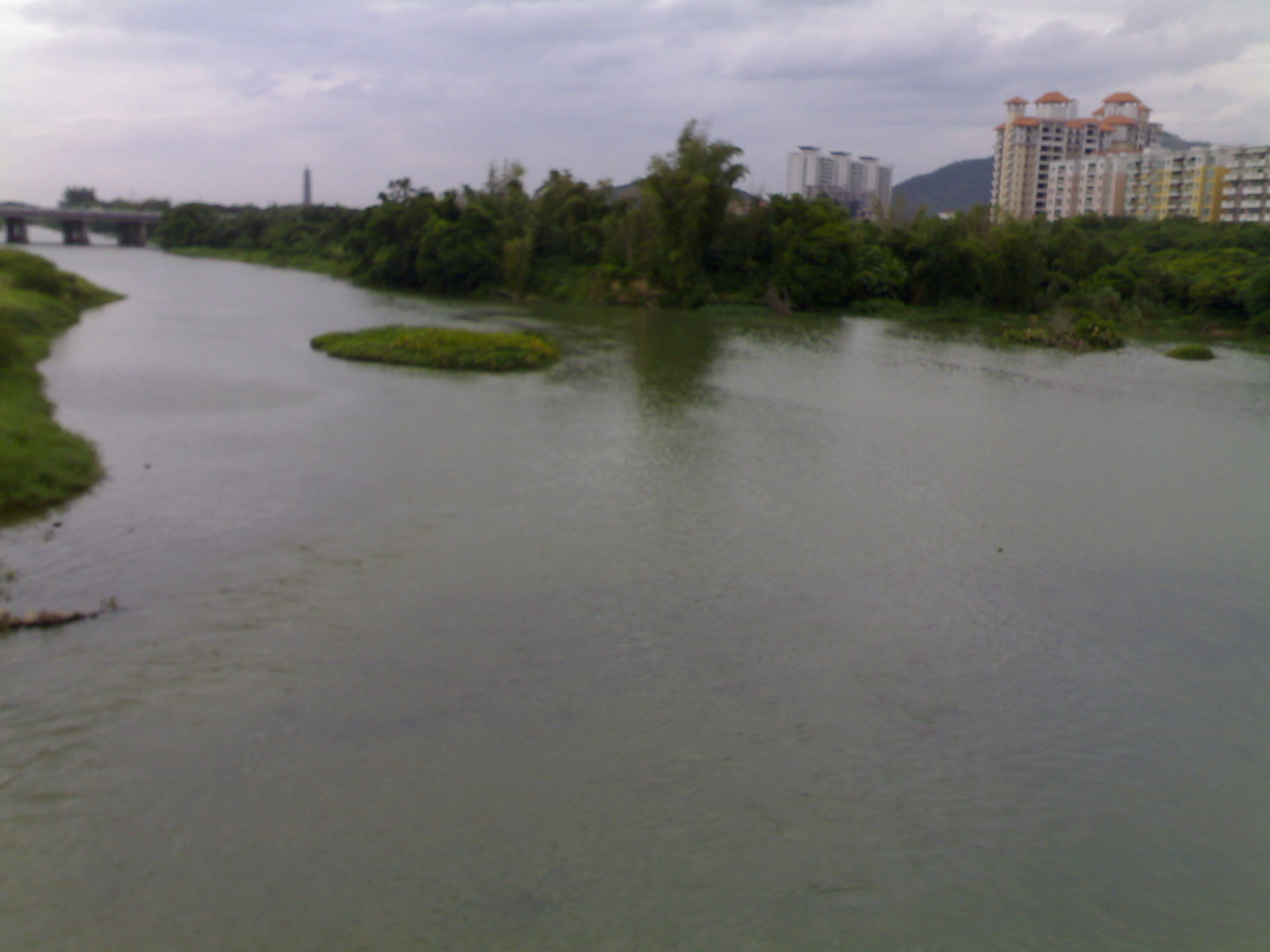

Location
- Country: China

Physical characteristics
- Mouth
  - location: Pearl River
- Length: 157 km (98 mi)

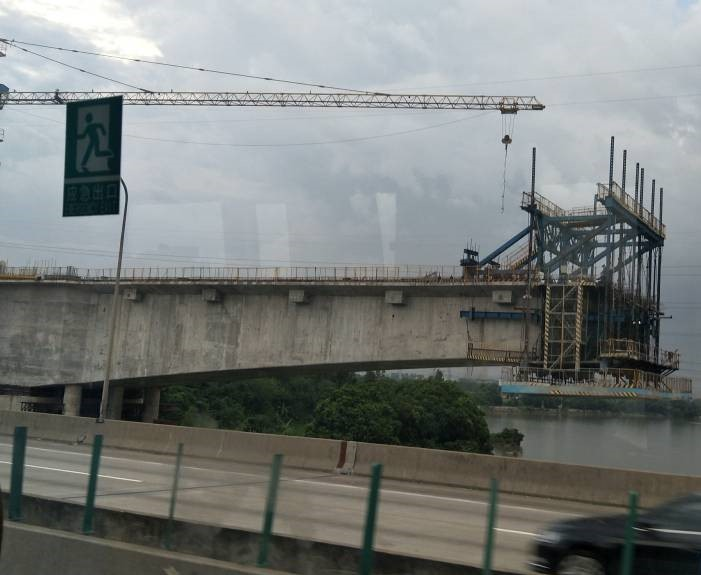
The Liuxi River Bridge on Guangzhou-Shitan railway.

The Liuxi River (Chinese: 流溪河; pinyin: Liúxī Hé), or simply Liuxi, is a tributary of the Pearl River in China with its basin situated northeast of Guangzhou in Guangdong Province. It lies between the Beijiang River and Dongjiang River and is interrupted by the Liuxihe Dam.
