= Open Data Center Alliance =

Cloud-computing standards organisation

opendatacenteralliance.org appears to have been closed down.

The Open Data Center Alliance is an independent organization created in Oct. 2010 with the assistance of Intel to coordinate the development of standards for cloud computing. Approximately 100 companies, which account for more than $50bn of IT spending, have joined the Alliance, including BMW, Royal Dutch Shell and Marriott Hotels. "The Alliance's Cloud 2015 vision is aimed at creating a federated cloud where common standards will be laid down for those in the hardware and software arena."

== Usage Model Roadmap ==
The organization sees a growing need for solutions developed in an open, industry-standard and multivendor fashion, and has thus created a usage model roadmap featuring 19 prioritized usage models. The usage models provide detailed requirements for data center and cloud solutions, and will include detailed technical documentation discussing the requirements for technology deployments.

To further its roadmap development, the steering committee established five initial technical workgroups in the areas of infrastructure, management, regulation & ecosystem, security and services.

The organization delivered a 0.50 usage model roadmap to Open Data Center Alliance technical workgroups in Oct. 2010, and delivered a full 1.0 roadmap for public use in June 2011.

== Membership ==
The steering committee consists of BMW, Capgemini, China Life, China Unicom Group, Deutsche Bank, JPMorgan Chase, Lockheed Martin, Marriott International, Inc., National Australia Bank, Royal Dutch Shell, Terremark and UBS. Other members include AT&T, CERN, eBay, Logica, Motorola Mobility Inc. and Nokia.

"The demands on the IT organisations are coming at such an alarming rate that there are many, many different solutions being developed today that maybe don't work with each other. We need one voice, one road map, so that companies are able to say to manufacturers here is a clear vision of what they should be developing their product to do." says Marvin Wheeler, of Terremark, chairman of the Alliance.

"While it's unclear how successful this alliance will be, it is at least shedding the spotlight on cloud interoperability, a big emerging issue," said Larry Dignan of ZDNet.
