= Datian railway station =

Railway station in Guangzhou, China

Coordinates: 23.26774°N 113.19809°E

Datian railway station in 2025

Datian railway station (Chinese: 大田站; pinyin: Dàtián zhàn) is a freight station of Guangzhou-Zhuhai Railway located at Datian Village (Chinese: 大田村), Jianggao Town (Chinese: 江高镇), Baiyun District, Guangzhou, Guangdong, China. It started operations in 2009.
