= Tetsuji Oda =

Japanese electrical engineer

Tetsuji Oda (born 1948) is a retired Japanese electrical engineer whose research involves electrostatic discharge. He is a professor emeritus at the University of Tokyo.

Oda is originally from Tokyo, and studied electrical and electronic engineering at the University of Tokyo, where he earned a bachelor's degree in 1971, a master's degree in 1973, and a PhD in 1976. He spent his entire academic career at the University of Tokyo, retiring as professor emeritus in 2013.

Oda was named Fellow of the Institute of Electrical and Electronics Engineers (IEEE) in 2015 "for contributions to electrostatics and high-pressure plasmas for environmental protection".
