= Starlicide =

Names
- Preferred IUPAC name 3-Chloro-4-methylaniline
- Other names 3-Chloro-4-methylbenzenamine; 2-Chloro-4-aminotoluene; 3-Chloro-p-toluidine; Gull toxicant; DRC-1339; CPTH

Identifiers
CAS Number	33240-95-8
3D model (JSmol)	Interactive image
ChemSpider	6985
ECHA InfoCard	100.002.225
PubChem CID	7255
CompTox Dashboard (EPA)	DTXSID0020286
- InChI: InChI=1S/C7H8ClN/c1-5-2-3-6(9)4-7(5)8/h2-4H,9H2,1H3
- SMILES: Clc1cc(N)ccc1C

Properties
Chemical formula	C_{7}H_{8}ClN
Molar mass	141.60 g·mol^{−1}
Appearance	Yellow to brown liquid
Density	1.167 g/cm^{3}
Melting point	26 °C (79 °F; 299 K)
Boiling point	233 °C (451 °F; 506 K)
Solubility in water	Soluble in hot water

Hazards
Flash point	100 °C (212 °F; 373 K)
- Lethal dose or concentration (LD, LC)
LD_{50} (median dose)	1500 mg/kg (oral, rat)
- Except where otherwise noted, data are given for materials in their standard state (at 25 °C [77 °F], 100 kPa). Infobox references

Starlicide or gull toxicant is a chemical avicide that is highly toxic to European starlings (thus the name) and gulls, but less toxic to other birds or to mammals such as humans and pets.

== Synonyms ==
The name starlicide originated as a registered trademark of the animal feed manufacturer Ralston-Purina in St. Louis, Missouri. Starlicide is a small molecule in which a central benzene ring is modified by amine, chloro and methyl substituents in a specific pattern. Because special names exist for benzene rings modified with one or two of these functional groups, several synonymous chemical names may be encountered: 3-chloro-4-methylaniline or 3-chloro-4-methylbenzenamine, 2-chloro-4-aminotoluene, or 3-chloro-p-toluidine. Numbered groups (2-chloro, 4-amino) also may be named out of order; the numbers of such groups equal the number of carbon atoms in the benzene ring separating them from the group implied in the special name.

Preparations of this chemical may be named as a hydrochloride (e.g. "3-chloro-p-toluidine hydrochloride", CPTH), indicating that hydrochloric acid has been used to neutralize the molecule to a salt in which the amine group is protonated and a chloride counterion is present; otherwise the free base is indicated. The chemical salt is also known as DRC-1339.

== Use ==
Starlicide is lethal to starlings with an acute oral median lethal dose of 3.8 milligrams per kilogram body weight, but it is less toxic to most other birds. Grain-eating game birds such as bobwhite quail, pheasants (Phasianus colchicus) and rooks (Corvus frugilegus) are also vulnerable. Hawks and mammals (only exception are cats) are resistant to the poison. Starlings are killed in a slow death by uremic poisoning and congestion of major organs. The effect is described as "a grayish white, frost-like material of uric acid overlaying the serosal surfaces of the various organs, accompanied by sterile inflammation and necrosis in the affected and adjacent tissues" akin to avian visceral gout. The site of action is believed to be in the kidney.

Uses for CPTH include killing blackbirds on sprouting rice and on corn and soybean fields. For these and other uses the poison is often given with brown rice. Research continues to improve the effectiveness of delivery on brown rice by causing the poison to be retained on the bait longer and resist degradation by sunlight. The effect of the poison is believed to be cumulative: for example, the LC_{50} for starlings was 4.7 ppm over 30 days, but only 1.0 ppm when fed for 90 days.

In New Zealand, starlicide is used for rook control.

In 2009, a culling with starlicide received national attention after USDA employees dispensed the poison in Griggstown, New Jersey, to kill an estimated 5,000 starlings that plagued feed lots and dairies on local farms. When "it began raining birds", community members became alarmed, unsure whether a toxin or disease was at work. Two property owners in the area reported collecting more than 150 birds each from their land.

In January 2011, there was another incident in Yankton, South Dakota, causing public alarm. The USDA had poisoned the birds in Nebraska to protect farmers' feeds. African countries use it to control house crows. 3-chloro-4-methylaniline is also used as intermediate for production of organic pigments, drugs and herbicide chlortoluron.

Trials started in Kenya in 2024 to use starlicide to control the population of the invasive House Crow, whose Kenyan population currently exceeds 700.000 birds.

== Ecological impacts ==
Starlicide can and does kill nontarget species of birds that eat at feedlots and other places it is used.

The Rusty blackbirds (Euphagus carolinus), a once abundant species that is declining precipitously, has been theorized to be declining as a result of the use of Starlicide. This issue has been analyzed and found to be insignificant. Rusty blackbirds primarily feed on invertebrates in wet woodlands and near streams throughout the year. Even though they roost with other blackbirds, rusty blackbirds will not usually feed with them. Rusty blackbirds are a species not likely to be taken protecting crops because they mostly feed in wet woodland bottoms on acorns, pine seeds, fruits, and animal matter during winter, but sometimes will be found in feedlots (Avery 2013). Even at the highest potential nontarget take with starlicide, few, if any, would be taken: not sufficient to cause a decline in their population. Habitat issues, possibly on their Canadian breeding habitat and on wintering grounds in the southeastern United States (for example, the decline of wetlands), is likely to be the primary reason for their decline. But, as poisoned birds may fly long distances before they die, it is difficult to find carcasses and results of studies may underestimate mortality. (This had been shown in studying effectiveness of poison to control ravens).

Starlicide is used in invasive and overabundant native bird control programs and proponents suggest, that reduction of such birds might benefit rare natives. However, harm-benefit ratio of these actions is controversial due to possible non-target by-kill and unpredictable effects of population reduction. Even if reduction is needed, non-lethal and physical lethal methods can also be effective, except for house crow control, so in many cases poison is currently being replaced with alternative methods. For example, effective reduction of gull population and related problems can be achieved by hazing, egg destruction and selective shooting of problem birds. Despite the fact that starlicide is used for mynas control programs, they can sometimes be successfully controlled or eradicated using trapping and shooting alone (a notable example being their eradication from Denis island).

There is an opinion that reduction of starlings benefits those native birds which nest in cavities, and, also, that reduction can cause an increase of insect pests and reduce food for raptors. (These two claims are not mutually exclusive). However, there is not enough verified data to support either claim, because studies of starlicide use were focused on direct mortality and did not include indirect effects. In Samoa, the use of starlicide for myna control causes native bird mortality and increases the chlorine in water and, though mynas pose some threat for native birds, risk-benefit ratio for this ecosystem is uncertain. Despite the poison being considered harmless for raptors in both primary and secondary poisoning issues, it can affect them indirectly. The use of starlicide (known locally as F-1) in Hungary to control rook population seems to have caused decline of red-footed falcon, which relies upon rooks for nesting and so pesticide was banned. 3-chloro-p-toluidine also can be released into environment in wastewater from factories which use it as intermediate or by biodegradation of chlortoluron. Non-avian toxicology of compound is poorly studied, yet high toxicity for freshwater invertebrates and fish has been noticed.

== See also ==
- Diclofenac
