= Shenjing station =

Shenjing station may refer to:

- Shenjing station (Guangzhou Metro), station of Guangzhou Metro
- Shenjing railway station, station of Pearl River Delta Intercity Railway
