= Shenjing railway station =

Guangdong Intercity railway station in Guangzhou, China

Shenjing 深井
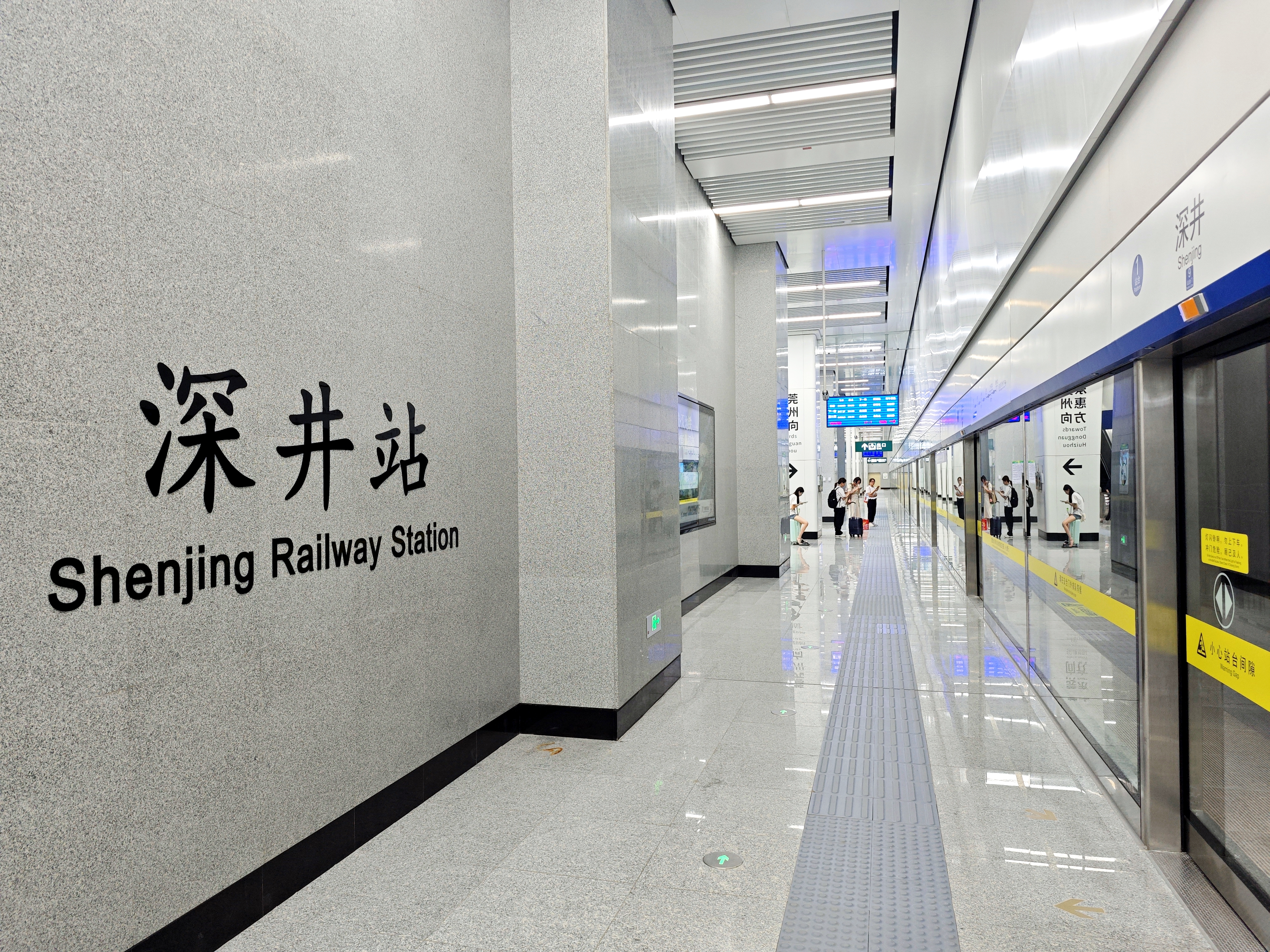
- Platform

Chinese name
- Chinese: 深井站
Transcriptions
Standard Mandarin
- Hanyu Pinyin: Shēnjǐng Zhàn
Yue: Cantonese
- Yale Romanization: Sāmjéng Jaahm
- Jyutping: Sam^{1}zeng^{2} Zaam^{6}

General information
- Location: Shenjing Village, Jinzhou South Road (金洲南路) within Changzhou Island; Changzhou Subdistrict, Huangpu District, Guangzhou, Guangdong; China
- Coordinates: 23°4′8.33″N 113°24′15.84″E
- Owner: Pearl River Delta Metropolitan Region intercity railway
- Operator: Guangdong Intercity
- Line: Pazhou–Lianhuashan intercity railway
- Platforms: 2 (1 island platform)
- Tracks: 2
- Connections: 7 Shenjing

Construction
- Structure type: Underground
- Accessible: Yes

Other information
- Station code: SHQ (Pinyin: SJI)

History
- Opened: 29 September 2025 (10 months ago)

Services
Preceding station	Pearl River Delta Metropolitan Region Intercity Railway	Following station
Pazhou Terminus	Pazhou–Lianhuashan intercity railway	Hualong South towards Guangzhou Lianhuashan
Transfer at Shenjing
Preceding station	Guangzhou Metro	Following station
Higher Education Mega Center South towards Meidi Dadao	Line 7 transfer at Shenjing	Changzhou towards Yanshan
Location

Shenjing railway station (Chinese: 深井站; pinyin: Shēnjǐng Zhàn; Cantonese Yale: Sāmjéng Jaahm) is an underground railway station on Pazhou–Lianhuashan intercity railway located in Huangpu District, Guangzhou, Guangdong, China. It opened on 29 September 2025.

== Features ==
The station has an underground island platform. It also has 2 wind shafts and a cooling tower.

There is a transfer passage connecting to Shenjing metro station on Guangzhou Metro Line 7.

=== Entrances/exits ===
The station has 4 points of entry/exit. In its initial opening, the station opened Exits E and H. Exits F and G are not open yet. As this station is connected to the metro station, the entrances/exits of the intercity stations are lettered from E to distinguish from the entrances/exits of the metro station, which are lettered A-D.

- E: Jinzhou South Road, Guangdong Provincial Workers' Hospital, Guangdong Museum of Traditional Chinese Medicine
- ~~F~~: (Not open)
- ~~G~~: (Not open)
- H: Jinzhou South Road
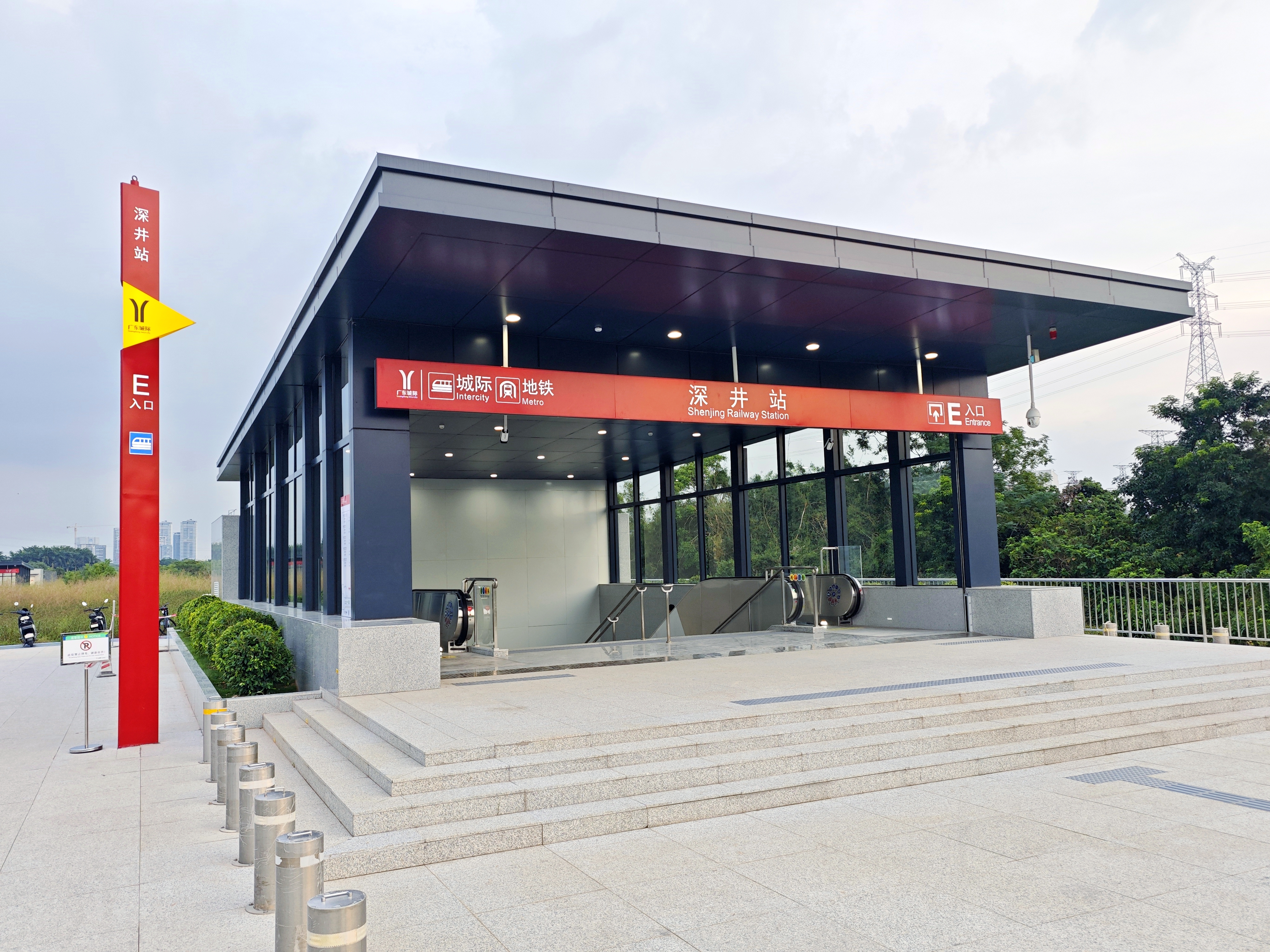
Entrance E

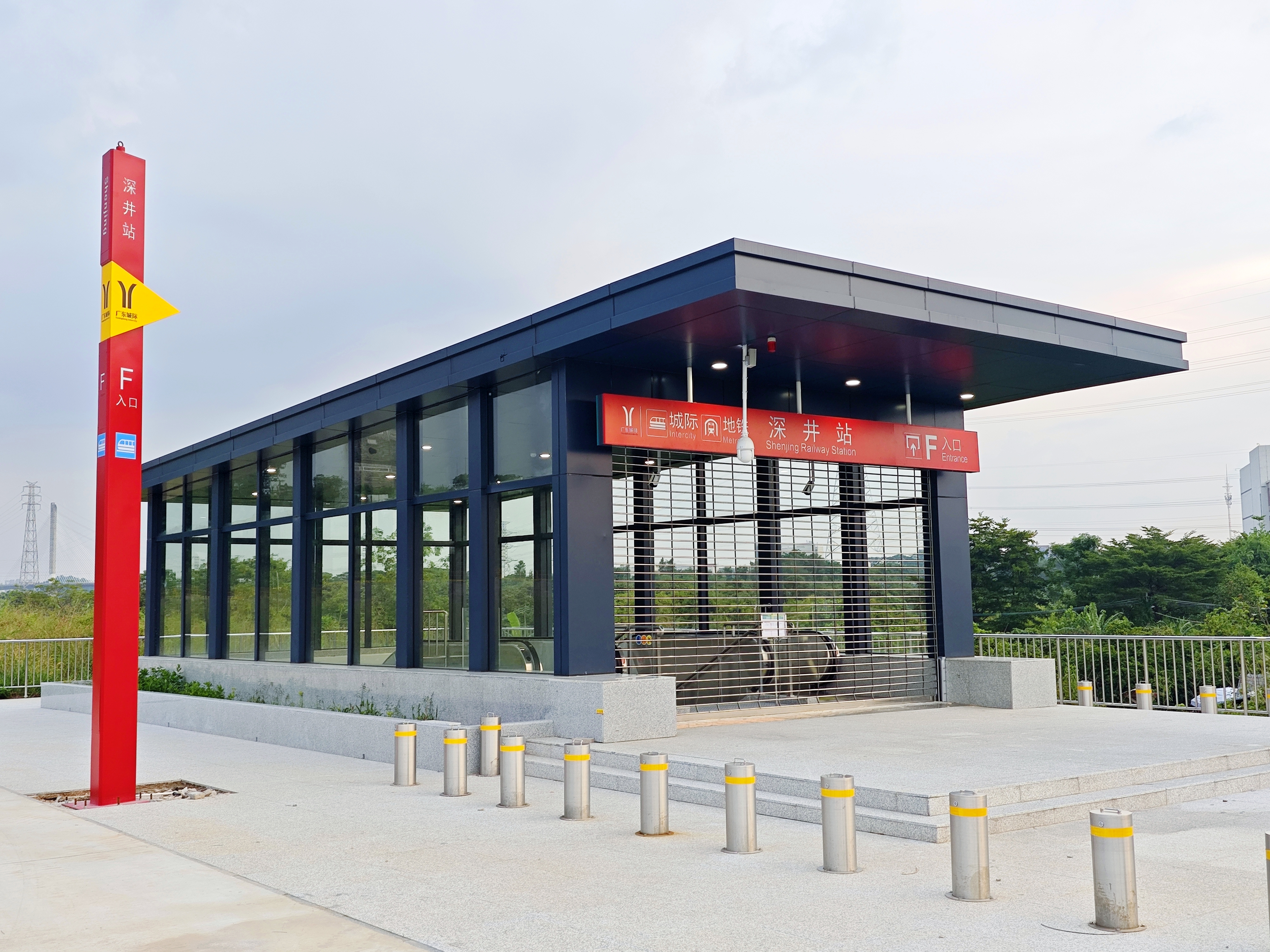
Entrance F

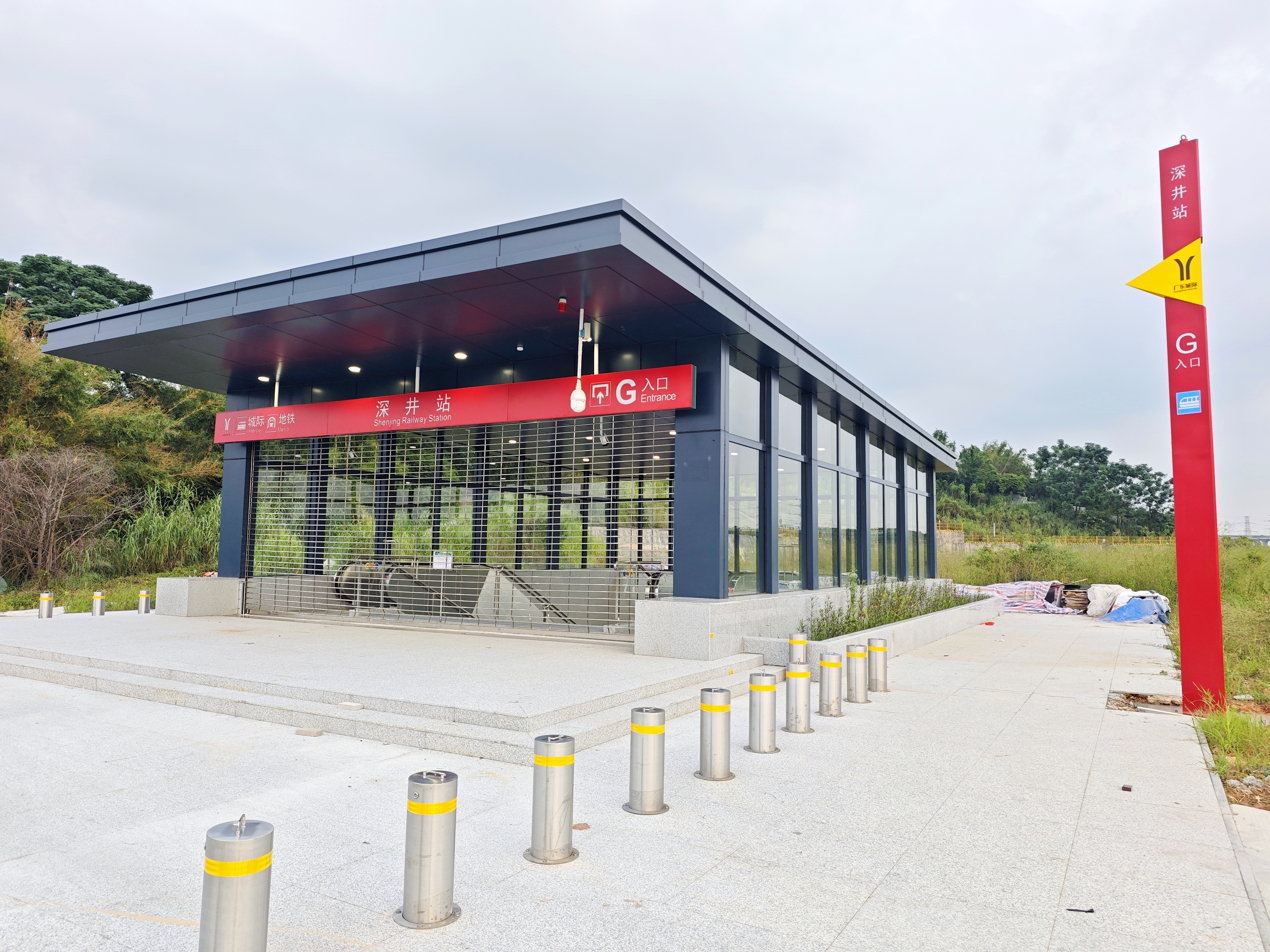
Entrance G

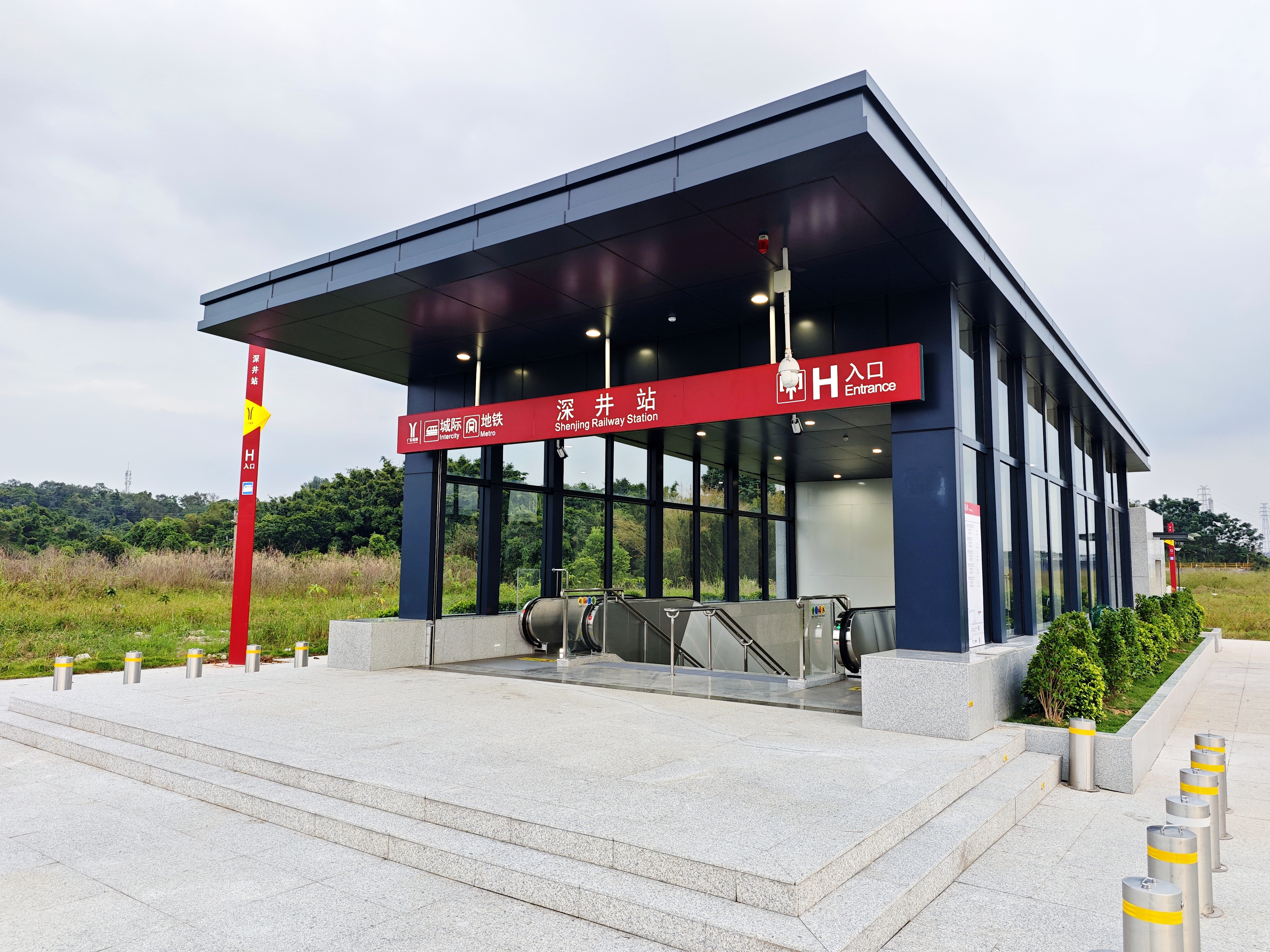
Entrance H

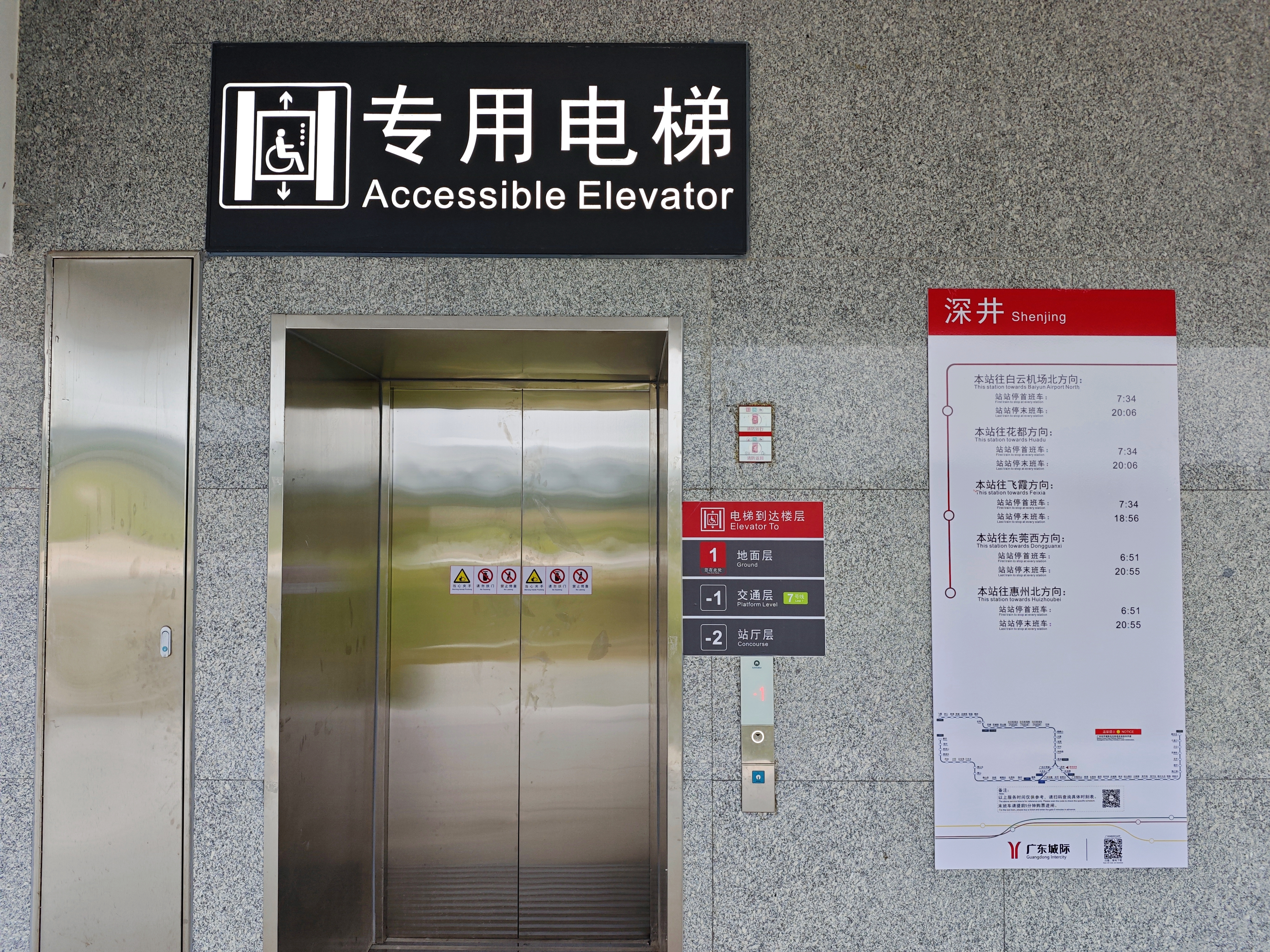
Entrance H (Elevator entrance)

== Gallery ==
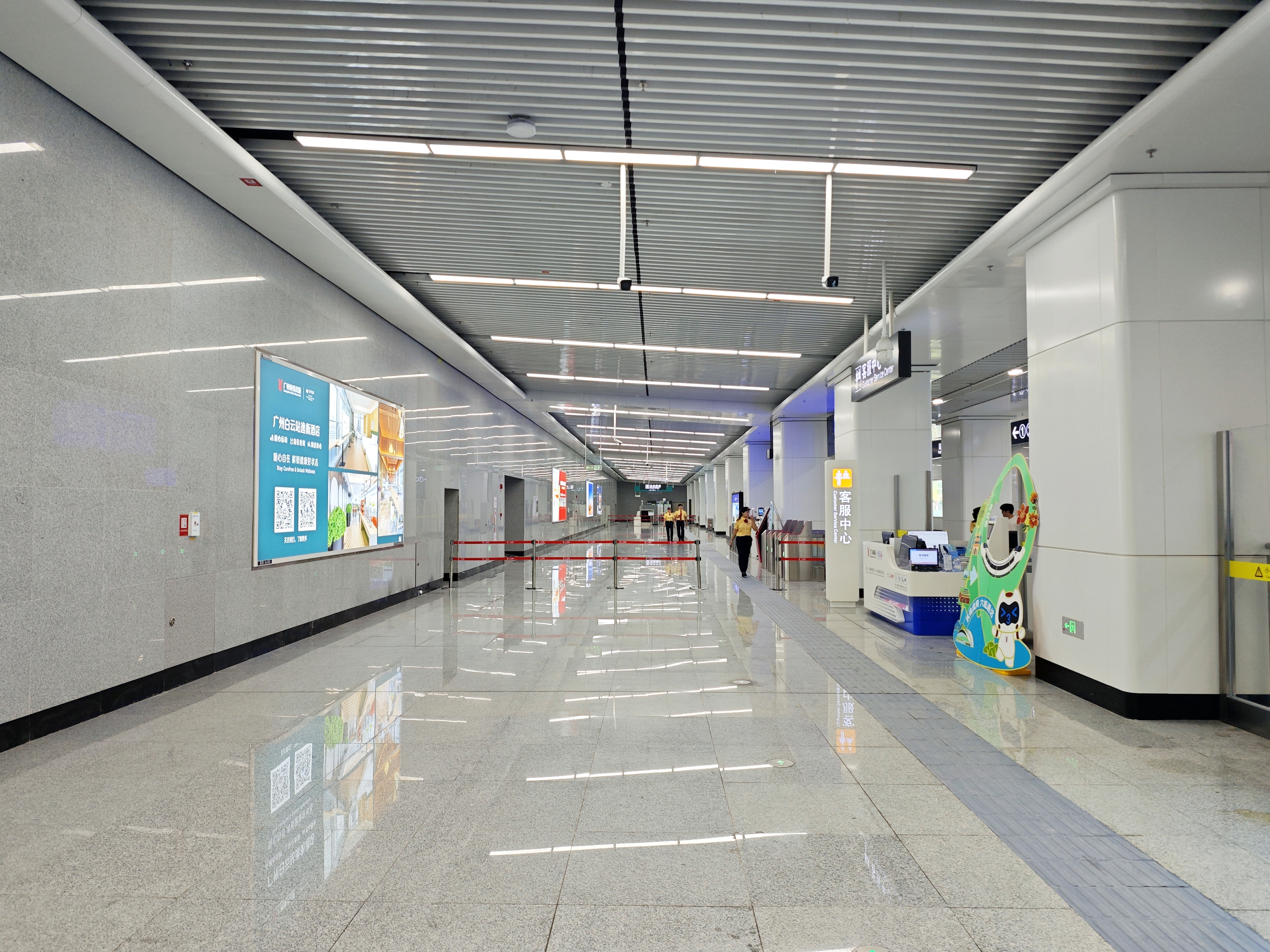
Concourse

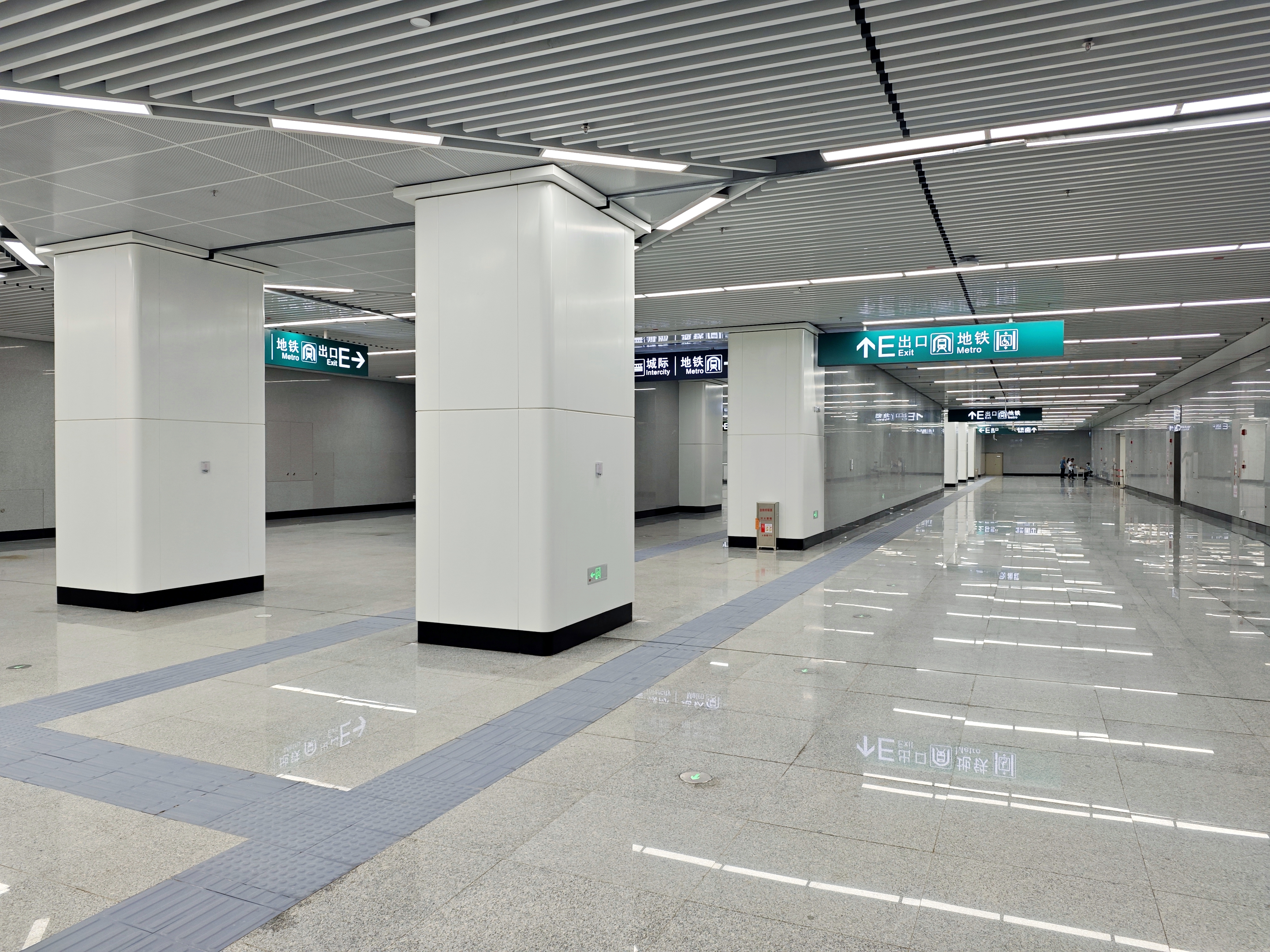
Transfer concourse on first basement floor

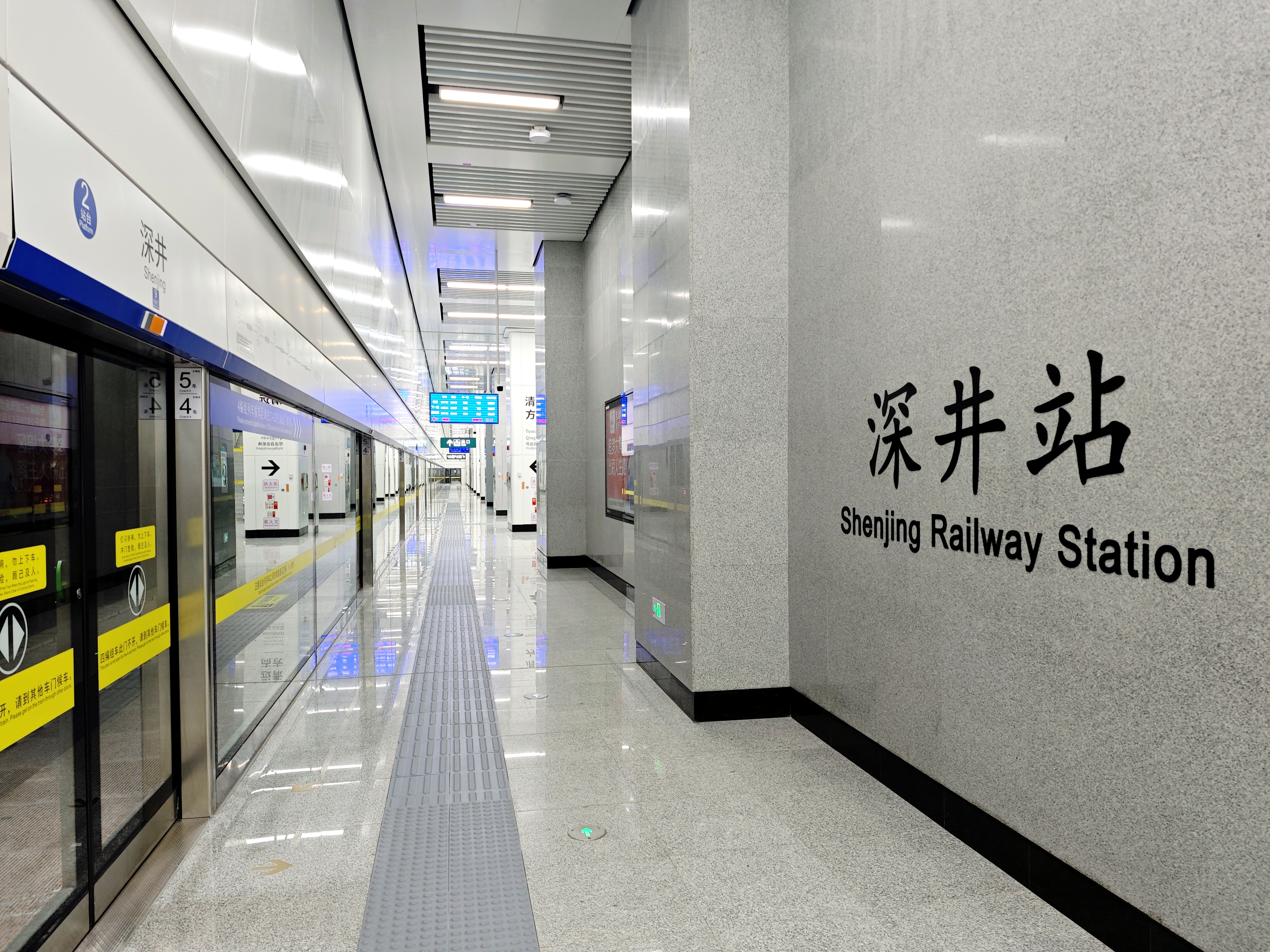
Platform 2

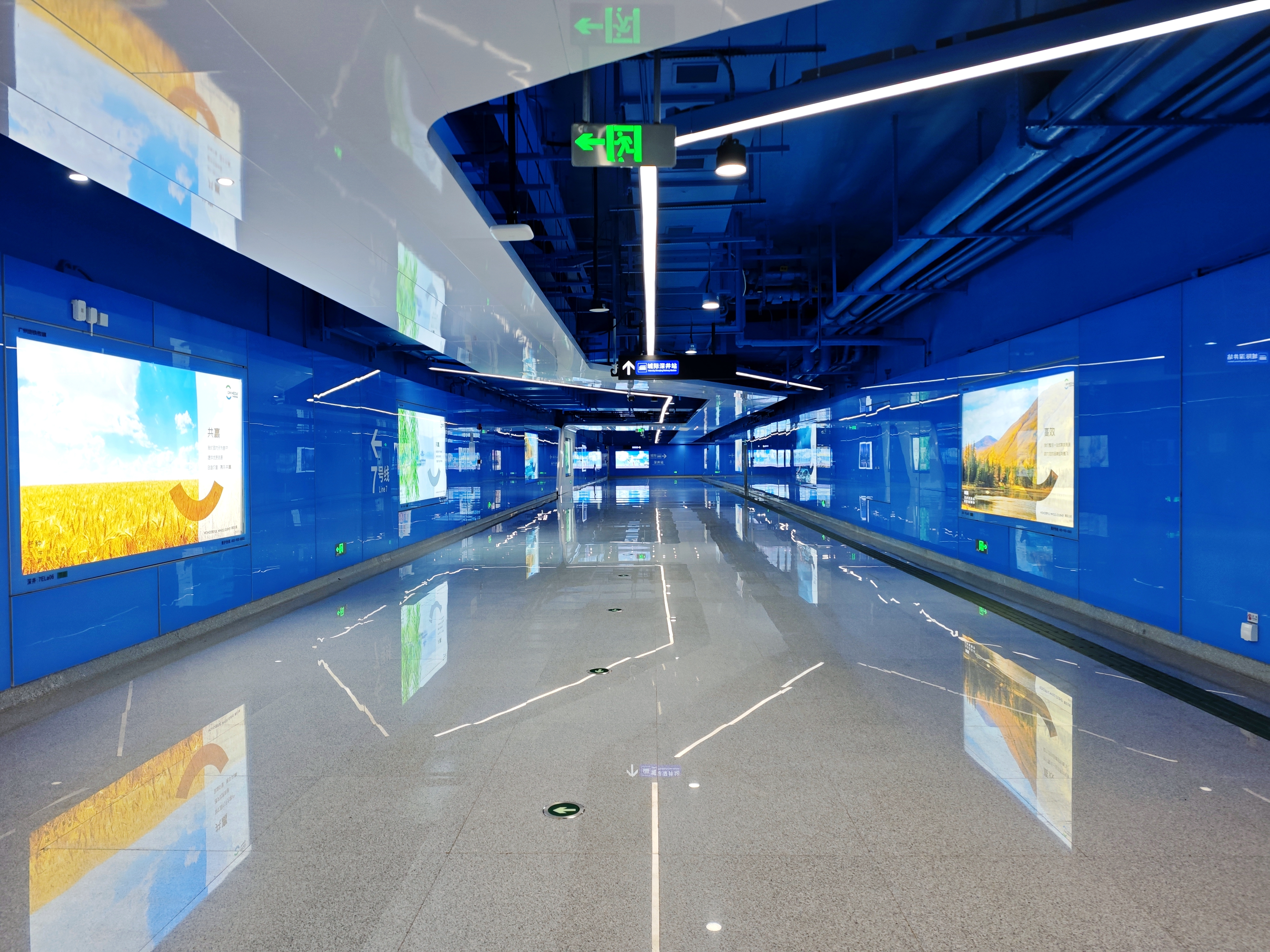
Transfer passage to metro station

== History ==
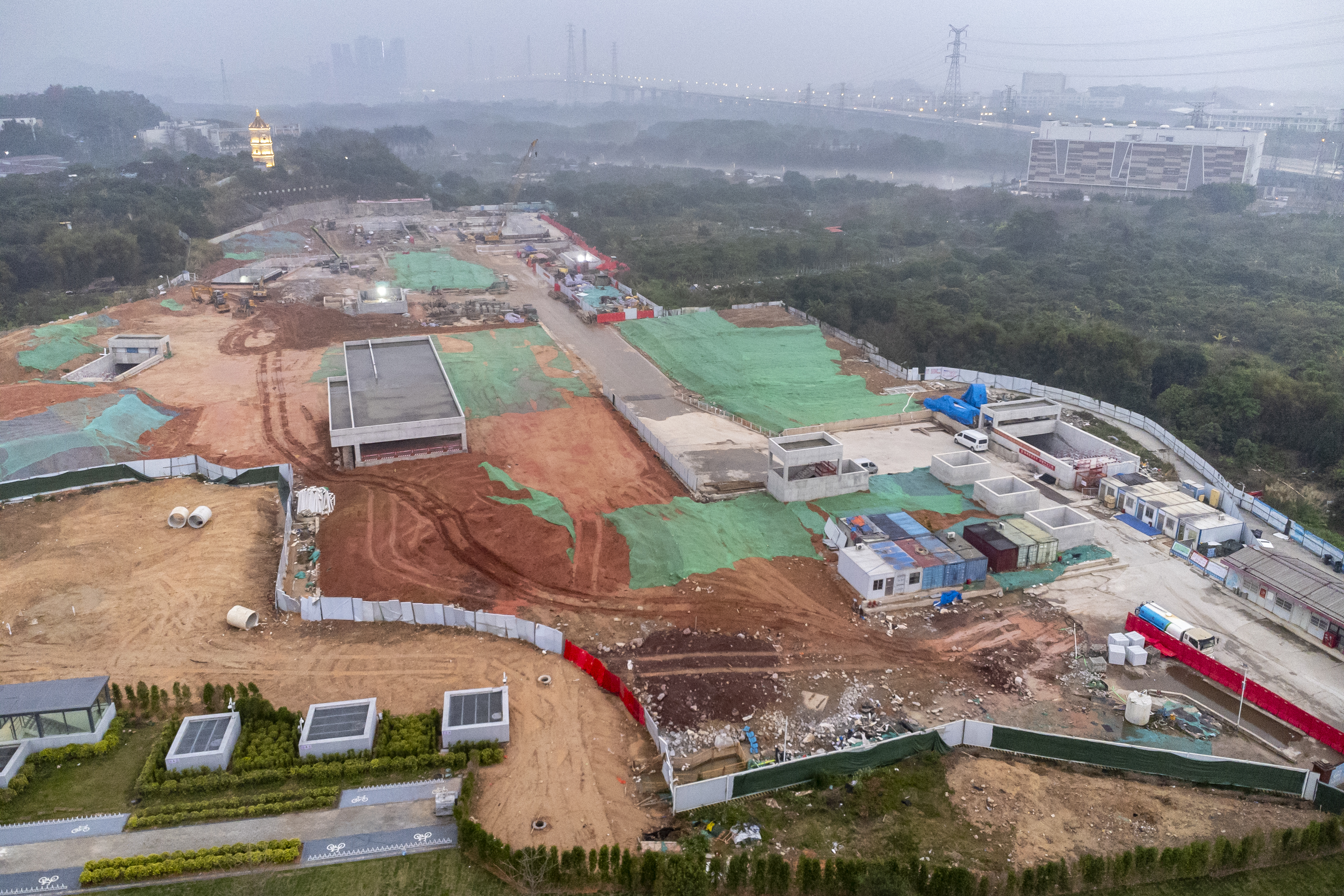
Construction site (March 2024)

In early planning of the Pazhou Intercity Branch Line, it ran through Guangzhou Higher Education Mega Center. Later, in order to avoid the Haizhu Wetland Park and the Higher Education Mega Center, the line was moved eastward, and a Higher Education Mega Center East station was set up on Changzhou Island on the east side of the Higher Education Mega Center.

In May 2021, the main structure of the station was fully completed. At the end of April 2024, the entire Guangzhou–Shenzhen intercity railway, including this station, obtained a construction project planning permit. In 2025, the station name was confirmed as Shenjing station.

On 29 September 2025, the station opened.
