= Shenjing station (Guangzhou Metro) =

Guangzhou Metro Line 7 station

Shenjing 深井
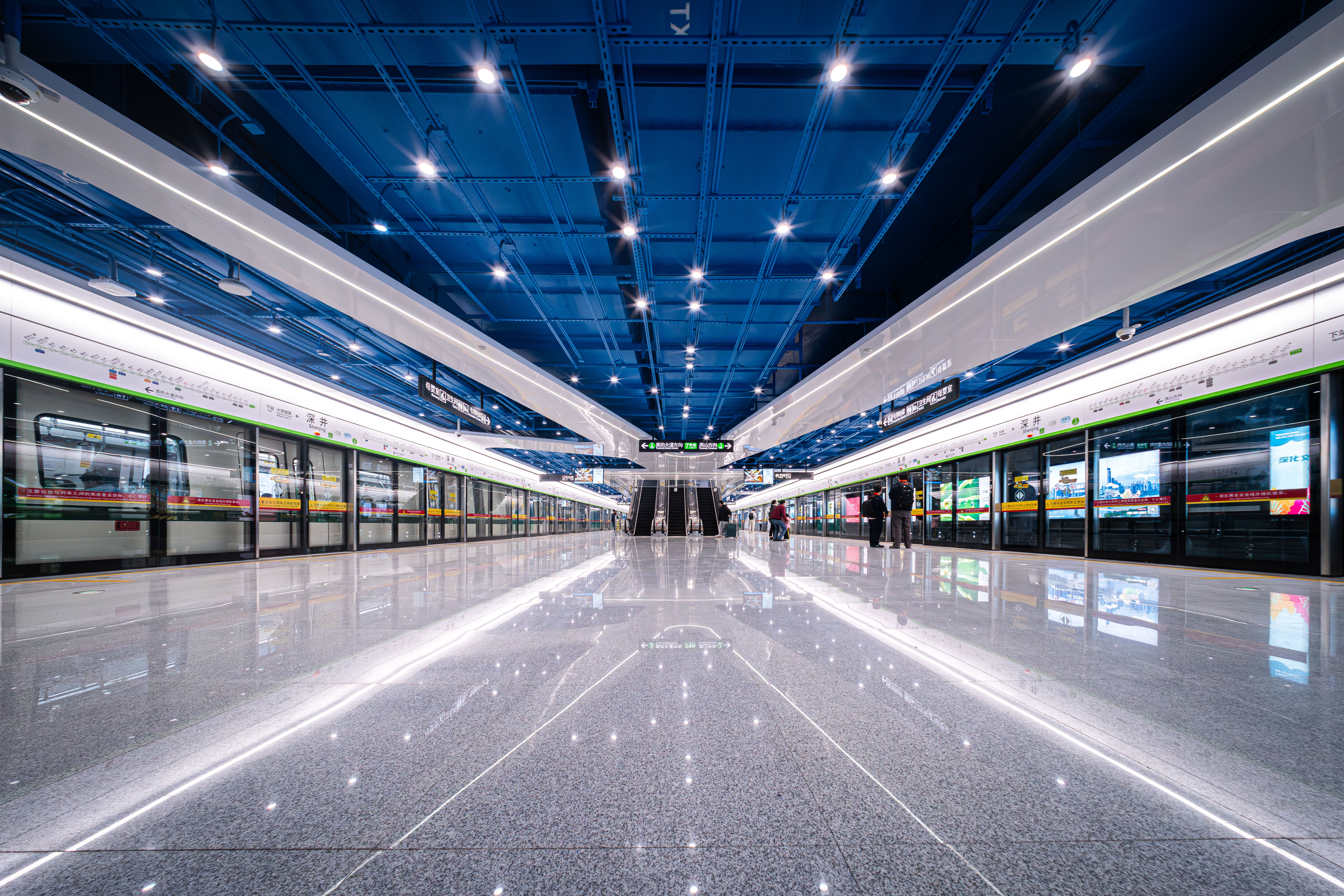
- Platform

Chinese name
- Chinese: 深井站
Transcriptions
Standard Mandarin
- Hanyu Pinyin: Shēnjǐng Zhàn
Yue: Cantonese
- Yale Romanization: Sāmjéng Jaahm
- Jyutping: Sam^{1}zeng^{2} Zaam^{6}
- Hong Kong Romanization: Sham Tseng station

General information
- Location: Shenjing Village, Jinzhou South Road (金洲南路) within Changzhou Island; Changzhou Subdistrict, Huangpu District, Guangzhou, Guangdong; China
- Coordinates: 23°4′15.64″N 113°24′13.75″E
- Operator: Guangzhou Metro Co. Ltd.
- Line: Line 7
- Platforms: 2 (1 island platform)
- Tracks: 2

Construction
- Structure type: Underground
- Accessible: Yes

Other information
- Station code: 710

History
- Opened: 28 December 2023 (2 years ago)

Services
| Preceding station | Guangzhou Metro | Following station |
|---|---|---|
| Higher Education Mega Center South towards Meidi Dadao | Line 7 | Changzhou towards Yanshan |
Transfer at Shenjing
| Preceding station | Pearl River Delta Metropolitan Region Intercity Railway | Following station |
| Pazhou Terminus | Pazhou–Lianhuashan intercity railway transfer at Shenjing | Hualong South towards Guangzhou Lianhuashan |
Location

Shenjing Station (Chinese: 深井站; pinyin: Shēnjǐng Zhàn; Cantonese Yale: Sāmjéng Jaahm) is a station of Guangzhou Metro Line 7, located underground at Jinzhou South Road within Shenjing Village on Changzhou Island in Guangzhou's Huangpu District. The station opened on 28 December 2023, with the opening of Phase 2 of Line 7.

It is the station on the Phase 2 extension that takes up the most land area.

== Station layout ==
| G | Street level | Exits A, C, D |
| L1; Concourse | Lobby | Ticket Machines, Customer Service, Shops, Police Station, Security Facilities |
| L1; Concourse | - | Transfer to PL |
| L2; Platforms | Platform 2 | 7 towards Meidi Dadao (Higher Education Mega Center South) |
| L2; Platforms | Island platform, doors will open on the left (Toilets, Nursery) |
| L2; Platforms | Platform 1 | 7 towards Yanshan (Changzhou) |

=== Entrances/exits ===
The station has 3 points of entry/exit. Exit C is equipped with an elevator. Next to Exit A, there is also a transfer passage connecting to Shenjing railway station.

- A: Jinzhou South Road, Guangdong Provincial Workers' Hospital
- C: Jinzhou South Road
- D: Jinzhou South Road, Guangdong Museum of Traditional Chinese Medicine
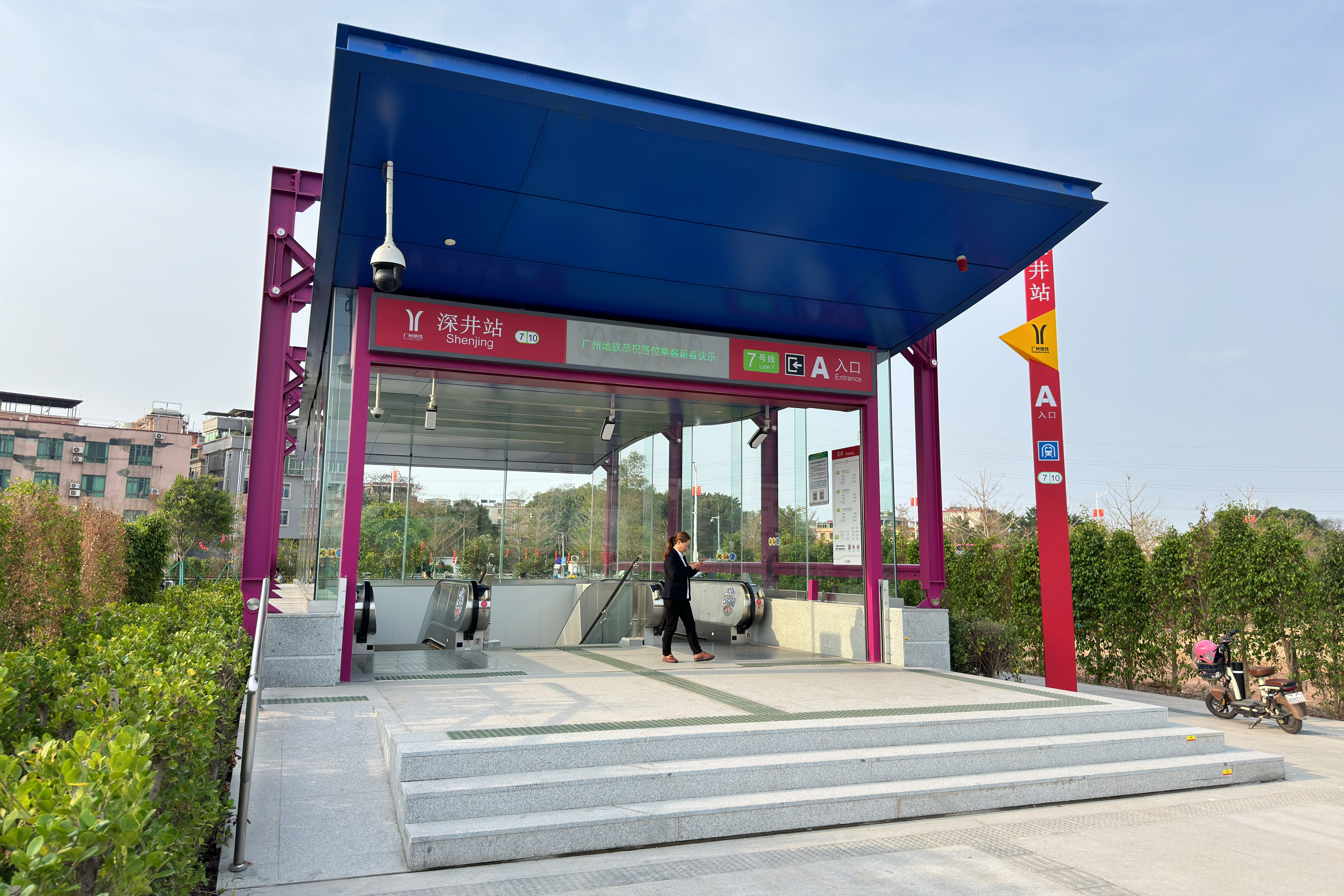
Entrance A

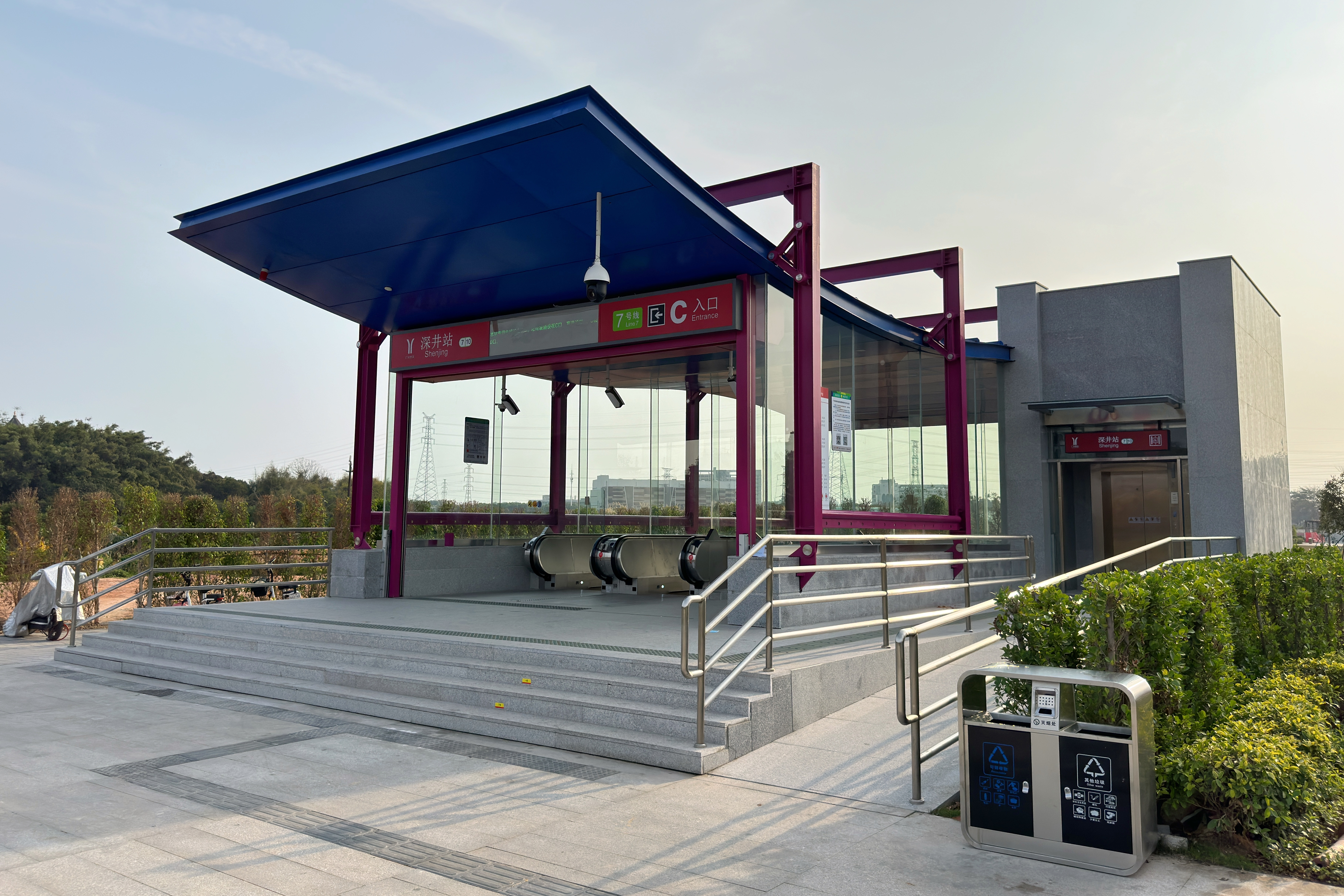
Entrance C

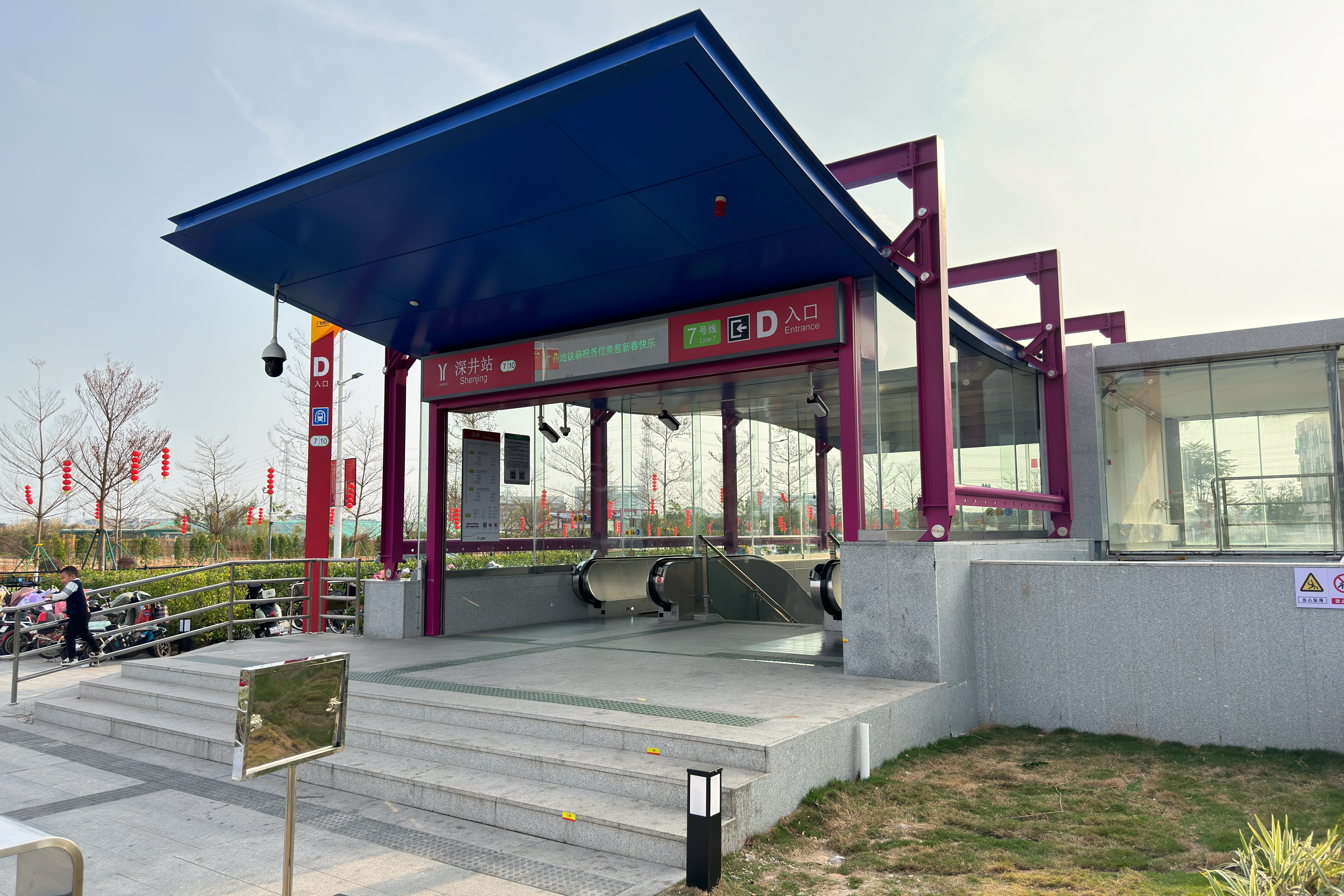
Entrance D

== Gallery ==
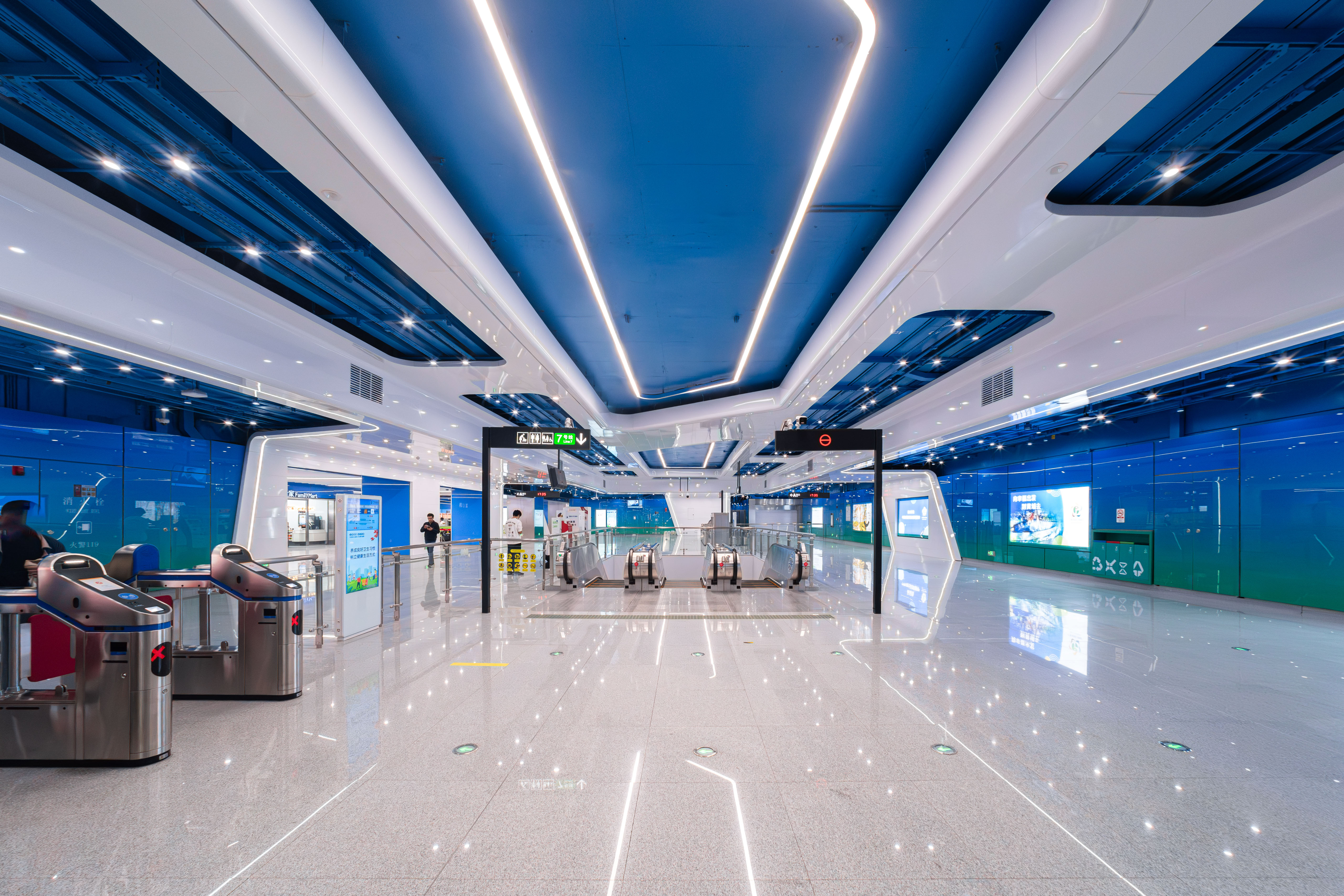
Concourse

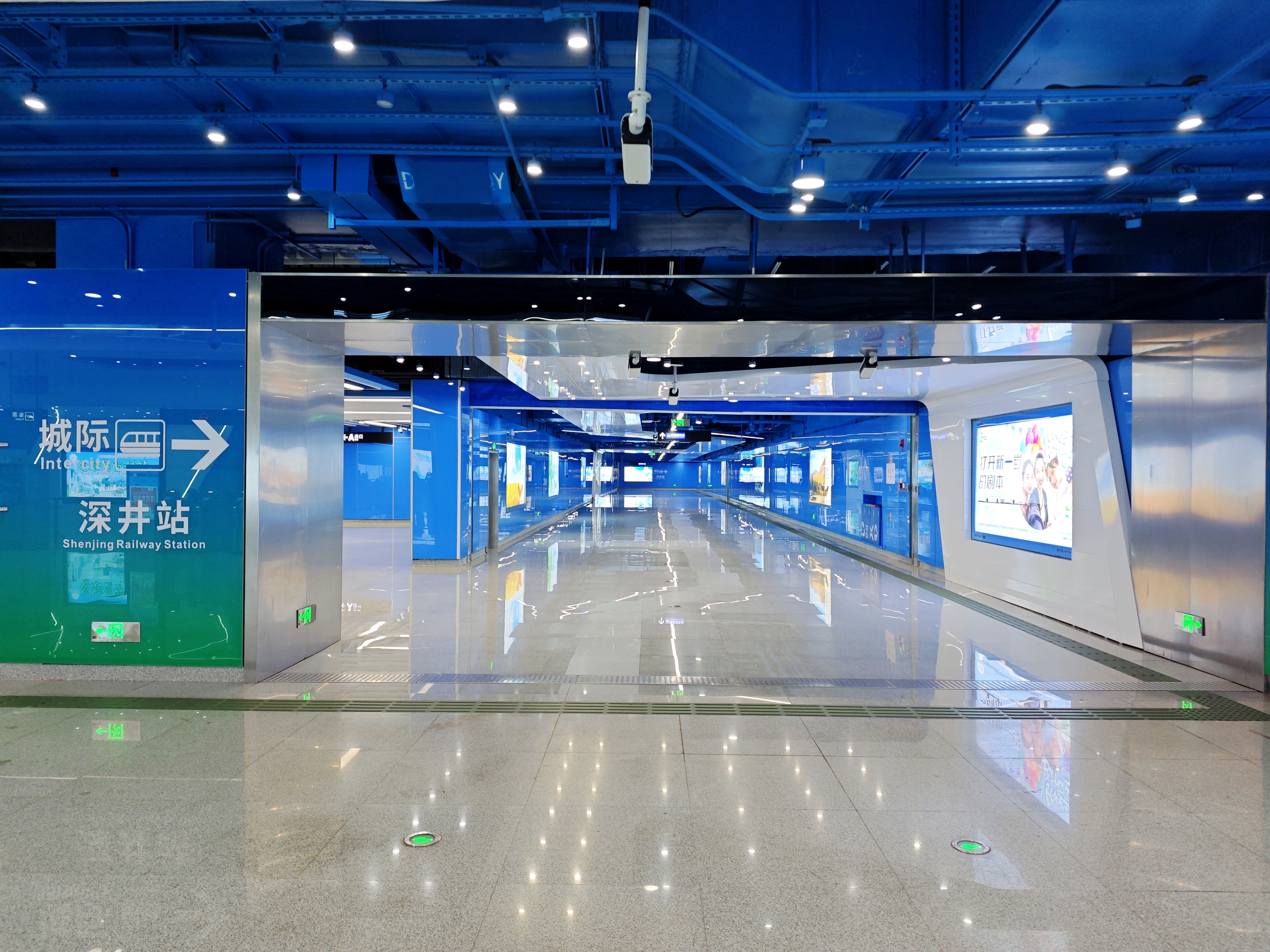
Transfer passage entrance to intercity station

== History ==
In February 2022, the main structure of the site topped out. In August the same year, the right line tunnel boring machine between the Higher Education Mega Center South middle wind shaft and the station broke through, marking the realization of a double-line breakthrough in the tunnel between the station and Higher Education Mega Center South Station. The station completed the "three rights" transfer in October 2023. At 12:00 on December 28, the station was put into use with the opening of Line 7 Phase 2.
